= List of ambassadors of Spain to Portugal =

Ambassador of Spain to Portugal
- Coat of Arms of Spain

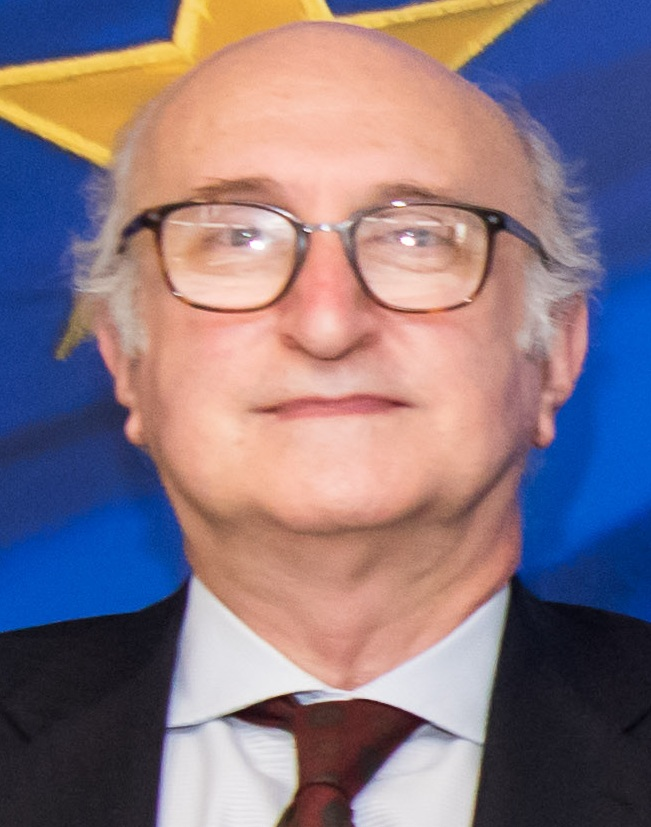
- Incumbent; Juan Fernández Trigo since 28 December 2023
- Ministry of Foreign Affairs
- Style: The Most Excellent
- Nominator: The Foreign Minister
- Appointer: The Monarch
- Deputy: Deputy Chief of Mission at the Embassy of Spain to Portugal

The ambassador of Spain to Portugal is Spain's foremost diplomatic representative in Portugal, and is in charge of Spain's diplomatic mission to the Republic of Portugal.

Since 2021, the ambassador is also accredited to the Community of Portuguese Language Countries, with observer status.

== History ==
The ambassador is appointed to the Council of Ministers, they direct the work of all the offices that depend on the embassy, based in Lisbon. Likewise, it informs the Spanish Government about the evolution of events in Portugal, negotiates on behalf of Spain, can sign or ratify agreements, observes the development of bilateral relations in all fields and ensures the protection of Spanish interests and its citizens in Portugal.

The current ambassador is Juan Fernández Trigo, who was appointed by Pedro Sánchez's government on 28 December 2023.

== List of ambassadors ==
From	Up To	Ambassador	Notes
1474	1474	Doctor Andrés Villalón	Envoy
1475	1475	Gómez Manrique	Envoy
1476	1476	Doctor Toledo	Envoy
1479	1479	Rodrigo Maldonado de Talavera	Plenipotentiary
1479	1479	Juan Díaz de Madrigal	Co-ambassadors
1479	1479	Hernando de Talavera	Co-ambassadors
1480	1480	Hernando de Talavera	Co-ambassadors
1480	1480	Alonso Manuel	Co-ambassadors
1480	1480	Juan de Ortega, Bishop of Coria	Co-ambassadors
1480	1480	Alvar Pérez de Medina	Co-ambassadors
1481	1481	Diego García de Padilla	Plenipotentiary
1482	1483	Juan de Ortega, Bishop of Coria	Co-ambassadors
1482	1483	Lope de Atouguía	Co-ambassadors
1483	1483	Hernando de Talavera	Ambassador
1484	1484	Iñigo Manrique, bishop of Córdoba	Co-ambassadors
1484	1484	Gaspar Fabra	Co-ambassadors
1484	1484	Doctor Lillo	Special envoy
1488	1488	Sancho Machuca	Envoy
1490	1490	Hernando de Talavera	Ambassador
1490	1490	Gutierre de Cárdenas	Envoy
1493	1493	Lope de Herrera	Envoy
1493	1494	Pedro de Ayala	Co-ambassadors
1493	1494	Garci López de Carvajal	Co-ambassadors
1495	1497	Alfonso de Silva	Ambassador
1496	1496	Álvaro de Bragança	Ambassador
1499	1499	Álvaro de Bragança	Ambassador
1505	1505	Enríquez Rodrigo	Envoy
1508	1509	Ochoa Álvarez de Isasaga	Envoy
1510	1510	Alonso de la Puente	Ambassador
1511	1511	Lope Hurtado de Mendoza	Ambassador
1517	1517	Miguel de Salamanca	Co-ambassadors
1517	1517	Pablo de Amerstorff	Co-ambassadors
1518	1518	Fadrique Álvarez de Toledo, 2nd Duke of Alba	Co-ambassadors
1518	1518	Alonso Manrique de Lara	Co-ambassadors
1518	1518	Juan Cabrero	Co-ambassadors
1518	1521	Brites de Mendoza	Ambassador
1521	1521	Juan Pardo de Tavera, Bishop of Ciudad Rodrigo	Extraordinary Ambassador
1521	1523	Cristóbal Barroso	Ambassador
1522	1522	Charles de Poupet	Extraordinary Ambassador
1522	1525	Juan de Zúñiga	Ambassador
1525	1526	Charles de Poupet	Ambassador
1527	1532	Lope Hurtado de Mendoza	
1536	1543	Luis Sarmiento de Mendoza	
1544	1552	Lope Hurtado de Mendoza	
1552	1552	Diego Hurtado de Mendoza	
1552	1556	Luis Sarmiento de Mendoza	
1556	1557	Juan Hurtado de Mendoza	
1557	1559	Juan de Mendoza y de Rivera	
1562	1567	Alonso de Tovar	
1567	1569	Fernando Carrillo de Mendoza y Villarreal	7th Count of Priego
1569	1575	Juan de Borja y Castro	1st Count of Mayalde
1576	1578	Juan de Silva	4th Count of Portalegre
1579	1580	Pedro Téllez-Girón y de la Cueva; Cristóbal de Moura; Rodrigo Vázquez de Arce; Luis de Molina	Téllez-Girón was the 1st Duke of Osuna
1580	1640	Philippine dynasty	Portugal under Spanish rule
1640	1668	Portuguese Restoration War	
1668	1668	Gaspar de Haro y Guzmán	7th Marquess of Carpio, 3rd Marquess of Eliche
1668	1670	Charles de Watteville	1st Baron of Watteville
1671	1673	Baltasar de Eraso y Toledo	2nd Count of Humanes
1673	1681	Juan Domingo Maserati	
1684	1690	Francisco Diego Ventura Fernández de Angulo, O.F.M.	Bishop of Ávila
1691	1698	Manuel de Sentmenat-Oms de Santa Pau y de Lanuza	1st Marquess of Castelldosrius
1702	1703	Domingo Capecelatro y Caracciolo	Marquess of Capecelatro
1715	1735	Domingo Capecelatro y Caracciolo	Marquess of Capecelatro
1727	1728	Carlos Ambrosio Gaetano Spínola de la Cerda	5th Marquess of Los Balbases
1737	1737	Domingo Capecelatro y Caracciolo	Marquess of Capecelatro
1739	1739	Bernardino de Marimón y Corberá	
1743	1746	Cristóbal Joaquín de Franchi y Benítez de Lugo	1st Marquess of Candia
1746	1753	Félix-Fernando Yáñez de Sotomayor Masones de Lima	3rd Duke of Sotomayor
1753	1755	Bernat Antoni de Boixadors i Sureda de Sant Martí	8th Count of Peralada
1755	1756	Pedro Pablo Abarca de Bolea y Ximenez de Urrea	10th Count of Aranda
1756	1760	Francisco Javier de Lanzós y Taboada	7th Count of Maceda
1760	1762	José Torrero y Marzo	
1765	1778	Pedro de Góngora y Luján	Marquess of Almodóvar del Río
1778	1787	Carlos José Gutiérrez de los Ríos	6th Count of Fernán Núñez
1789	1790	Juan de Silva Rabatta y Meneses	14th Count of Cifuentes
1792	1798	Juan Vicente María Imperiali y Centurión	8th Marquess of Oyra
1798	1800	Diego Fernández de Velasco	13th Duke of Frías
1803	1807	Manuel Negrete de la Torre	2nd Count of Campo de Alange
1822	1823	Manuel María de Aguilar	
1823	1825	José Antonio de Aragón Azlor	13th Duke of Villahermosa
1825	1827	José Flórez y Pereira	2nd Count of Casa Florez
1829	1833	Joaquín de Acosta y Montealegre	
1833	1834	Luis Fernández de Córdova	
1834	1838	Evaristo Pérez de Castro	
1838	1843	Manuel María de Aguilar	
1847	1847	Luis González Brabo	
1847	1847	Luis López de la Torre Ayllón	
1847	1850	Salvador de Zea Bermúdez	Count of Colombi
1851	1851	Antonio Caballero	
1851	1854	Antonio Alcalá Galiano	
1854	1855	Antonio de los Ríos Rosas	
1855	1856	Patricio de la Escosura	
1856	1856	Luis González Brabo	2nd term
1856	1857	Luis López de la Torre Ayllón	2nd term
1858	1860	Antonio Alcalá Galiano	2nd term
1860	1861	Nicomedes Pastor Díaz	
1862	1864	Juan Ximénez de Sandoval	Marqués de la Rivera
1864	1865	Diego Coello de Portugal y Quesada	
1866	1868	Miguel de los Santos Bañuelos	
1868	1870	Cipriano del Mazo Gherardi	
1870	1871	Ángel Fernández de los Ríos	
1875	1877	Agustín Esteban Collantes	
1875	1877	Alejandro de Castro Casal	
1878	1879	Carlos O’Donnell y Vargas	2nd Duke of Tetuán
1879	1881	Emilio Alcalá-Galiano y Valencia	Count of Casa-Valencia
1881	1883	Juan Valera y Alcalá-Galiano	
1883	1884	Felipe Méndez de Vigo	
1884	1886	Saturnino Álvarez Bugallal	
1886	1892	Felipe Méndez de Vigo	2nd term
1893	1895	Tomás Piñeiro y Aguilar	Marqués de Bendaña
1895	1897	Ángel Ruata y Sichar	
1897	1899	Juan Jordán de Urríes y Ruiz de Arana	Marqués de Ayerbe
1899	1904	Luis Polo de Bernabé	
1904	1904	Bernardo Jacinto de Cólogan y Cólogan	
1904	1905	Cipriano Muñoz y Manzano	Count of la Viñaza
1905	1906	Bernabé Dávila y Bertoletti	
1906	1907	Ulpiano García de Olañeta	Marqués de Valdeterrazo
1907	1910	Fernando Sartorius y Chacón	Conde de San Luis
1910	1913	Rodrigo de Saavedra y Vinent	Marquess of Villalobar
1913	1915	Luis Valera y Delavat	Marquess of Villasinda
1915	1917	Antonio López Muñoz	
1917	1926	Alejandro Padilla y Bell	
1926	1929	Cristóbal Fernández-Vallín y Alfonso	
1929	1930	Bernardo Almeida y Herreros	
1930	1931	Mauricio López-Roberts y Terry	3rd Marquess of Torrehermosa
1931	1933	Juan José Rocha García	
1933	1936	José Juncal Verdulla	
1936	1936	Claudio Sánchez-Albornoz y Menduiña	
1938	1957	Nicolás Franco Bahamonde	
1958	1969	José Ibáñez Martín	
1969	1972	José Antonio Giménez-Arnau y Gran	
1972	1974	Emilio de Navasqüés	
1974	1976	Antonio Poch Gutiérrez de Caviedes	
1977	1982	Fernando Rodríguez-Porrero y de Chávarri	
1982	1985	Ramón Fernández de Soignie	
1985	1991	Gabriel Ferrán de Alfaro	
1991	1995	José Joaquín Puig de la Bellacasa y Urdampilleta	
1995	1999	Raúl Morodo	
1999	2002	José Rodríguez-Spiteri	
2002	2005	Carlos Carderera Soler	
2005	2008	Enrique Panés Calpe	
2008	2010	Alberto José Navarro González	
2010	2012	Francisco Villar y Ortiz de Urbina	
2012	2015	Eduardo Junco Bonet	
2015	2017	Juan Manuel de Barandica	
2017	2018	Eduardo Gutiérrez Sáenz de Buruaga	
2018	2023	Marta Betanzos Roig	
2023	Incumbent	Juan Fernández Trigo	(Note: Juan Fernández Trigo was previously Secretary of State for Ibero-America, Head of Mission at the Spanish Embassy in Venezuela (when the representation was left without an ambassador), Spanish ambassador to Haiti, Paraguay, Cuba and Chief ambassador of the European Union Delegation in Uruguay.)

== See also ==
- Spain – Portugal relations
- Foreign relations of Spain
- List of ambassadors of the United States to Portugal
