= List of ambassadors of Spain to Italy =

Ambassador of Spain to Italy
- Coat of Arms of Spain
- Incumbent; Miguel Ángel Fernández-Palacios since 12 October 2022
- Ministry of Foreign Affairs
- Style: The Most Excellent
- Nominator: The Foreign Minister
- Appointer: The Monarch
- Formation: 1887
- First holder: Felipe Mendez de Vigo
- Deputy: Deputy Chief of Mission at the Embassy of Spain to Italy

The ambassador of the Kingdom of Spain to the Italian Republic is the official representative of Spain to Italy. It is in charge of Italy–Spain relations and it represents Spanish interests before the United Nations agencies headquartered in Rome. It is also accredited to the Republic of San Marino.

== History ==
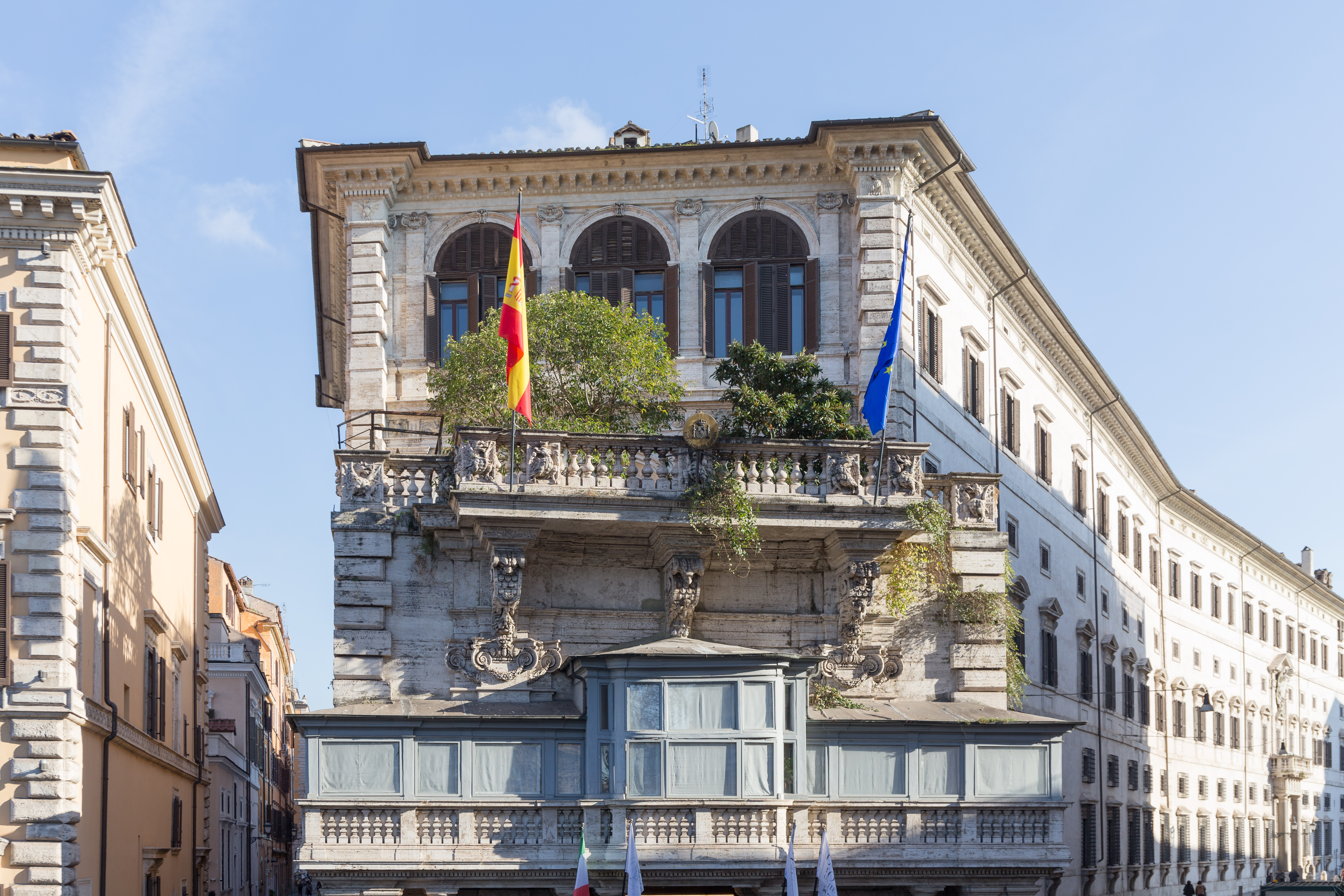
Embassy of Spain, Rome (in the Palazzo Borghese)

The ambassador is appointed to the Council of Ministers, they direct the work of all the offices that depend on the embassy, based in Rome. Likewise, it informs the Spanish Government about the evolution of events in Italy, negotiates on behalf of Spain, can sign or ratify agreements, observes the development of bilateral relations in all fields and ensures the protection of Spanish interests and its citizens in Italy.

Since 1947, the first floor of the Palazzo Borghese on the Tiber River in Rome has been the seat of the Embassy of Spain in Italy. The current ambassador is Miguel Ángel Fernández-Palacios, who was appointed by Pedro Sánchez's government on 12 October 2022.

=== Accreditation ===
In accordance with Article 87 of the Constitution of the Italian Republic, the president of the republic is responsible for the reception and accreditation of foreign ambassadors. Therefore, the Spanish ambassadors in Italy must be accredited to the president once they arrive in the Cisalpine country. During the monarchy this attribution corresponded to the King of Italy, according to the Statuto Albertino of 1848.

However, as it is a semi-presidential republic, the Italian government is responsible for directing foreign policy and the relationship with the ambassadors accredited to Italy.

=== Demarcation ===
The Spanish embassy in Italy is also accredited in:

- Republic of San Marino: San Marino established diplomatic relations with Spain in 1978, and at ambassadorial level in 1992, although since its origins the Consular affairs of this European republic have depended on the Spanish Embassy in Rome.
- United Nations agencies in Rome: Food and Agriculture Organization (FAO), World Food Programme (WFP) and International Fund for Agricultural Development (IFAD).

In the past the embassy in Rome was accredited to:

- Republic of Malta: Malta was also included in Rome's demarcation from 1969 to 1977 when a permanent mission was established in Valletta. This embassy was suppressed in 1998, and became dependent again on the Spanish Embassy in Rome. This situation continued until 2004 when the embassy in the island country was reestablished.
- Republic of Albania: Spain and Albania established diplomatic relations on 12 September 1986, although Consular affairs in Tirana depended on the Spanish Embassy in Belgrade until 1993 when they became dependent on that of Rome. Finally, in 2006 the Spanish government created a Spanish Embassy in Albania.

== List of diplomatic representatives (since 1865) ==
Diplomatic ranks
Ambassador/Apostolic Nuncio
Envoy Extraordinary and Minister Plenipotentiary
Resident Minister
Consul
Chargé d'affaires

Head of mission	Designation	Cessation	Appointed by	Accredited before	Notes	Demarcation
Kingdom of Italy (1861–1946)
Augusto Ulloa	1 August 1865	24 September 1866	Leopoldo O'Donnell	Victor Emmanuel II		
Enrique Ramírez de Saavedra	24 September 1866	14 October 1868	Ramón María Narváez	Victor Emmanuel II		
Francisco de Paula Montemar	6 January 1869	4 March 1873	Francisco Serrano	Victor Emmanuel II		
Manuel Rancés y Villanueva	28 September 1874	4 April 1875	Práxedes Mateo Sagasta	Victor Emmanuel II		
Diego Coello de Portugal	30 May 1875	4 March 1881	Antonio Cánovas del Castillo	Victor Emmanuel II		
Cipriano del Mazo y Gherardi	4 March 1881	29 February 1884	Práxedes Mateo Sagasta	Umberto I		
Felipe Méndez de Vigo	29 February 1884	26 January 1886	Antonio Cánovas del Castillo	Umberto I		
Juan Antonio de Rascón	26 January 1886	8 November 1888	Práxedes Mateo Sagasta	Umberto I		
Cipriano del Mazo y Gherardi	8 November 1888	8 August 1890	Práxedes Mateo Sagasta	Umberto I		
Francisco Merry y Colom	24 August 1890	31 January 1893	Antonio Cánovas del Castillo	Umberto I		
Juan Antonio de Rascón	31 January 1893	10 July 1895	Práxedes Mateo Sagasta	Umberto I		
Francisco Merry y Colom	10 July 1895	16 November 1897	Antonio Cánovas del Castillo	Umberto I		
Cipriano del Mazo y Gherardi	16 November 1897	10 April 1899	Práxedes Mateo Sagasta	Umberto I		
Francisco Merry y Colom	10 April 1899	4 May 1900	Francisco Silvela	Umberto I		
Enrique Dupuy de Lôme	4 May 1900	14 May 1901	Francisco Silvela	Umberto I		
Cipriano del Mazo y Gherardi	14 May 1901	8 July 1903	Práxedes Mateo Sagasta	Victor Emmanuel III		
Enrique Dupuy de Lôme	8 July 1903	21 July 1904	Francisco Silvela	Victor Emmanuel III		
Luis Polo de Bernabé	21 July 1904	20 March 1905	Antonio Maura	Victor Emmanuel III		
Antonio de Castro y Casaléiz	20 March 1905	20 August 1905	Raimundo Fernández Villaverde	Victor Emmanuel III		
José Brunetti y Gayoso	20 August 1905	22 May 1907	Eugenio Montero Ríos	Victor Emmanuel III		
Juan Pérez-Caballero y Ferrer	22 May 1907	22 October 1909	Antonio Maura	Victor Emmanuel III		
Ulpiano González de Olañeta	14 January 1910	11 October 1911	Segismundo Moret	Victor Emmanuel III		
Ramón Piña y Millet	11 October 1911	28 September 1916	José Canalejas	Victor Emmanuel III		
Wenceslao Ramírez de Villa-Urrutia	28 September 1916	21 February 1923	Eduardo Dato	Victor Emmanuel III		
Francisco de Reynoso y Mateo	21 February 1923	10 February 1924	Manuel García Prieto	Victor Emmanuel III		
Cipriano Muñoz y Manzano	10 February 1924	18 April 1931	Miguel Primo de Rivera	Victor Emmanuel III		
Gabriel Alomar	7 June 1931	22 February 1934	Niceto Alcalá Zamora	Victor Emmanuel III		
Justo Gómez Ocerín	22 February 1934	5 May 1936	Alejandro Lerroux	Victor Emmanuel III		
Manuel Aguirre de Cárcer	5 May 1936	7 August 1936	Manuel Azaña	Victor Emmanuel III		
José Aguinaga y Barona	7 August 1936	28 December 1936	José Giral	Victor Emmanuel III		
Pedro García Conde	28 December 1936	4 June 1937	Francisco Franco	Victor Emmanuel III		
Pedro García Conde	4 June 1937	4 January 1941	Francisco Franco	Victor Emmanuel III		
José Antonio de Sangróniz	4 January 1945	13 January 1956	Francisco Franco	Victor Emmanuel III		
Italian Republic (1946–present)
José Antonio de Sangróniz	4 January 1945	13 January 1956	Francisco Franco	Alcide De Gasperi Enrico De Nicola		
Emilio de Navasqüés	13 January 1956	6 May 1959	Francisco Franco	Giovanni Gronchi		
José María Doussinague y Texidor	13 May 1959	27 September 1962	Francisco Franco	Giovanni Gronchi		
Alfonso Sánchez Bella	25 October 1962	8 November 1969	Francisco Franco	Antonio Segni		Malta
Juan Pablo de Lojendio e Irure	5 December 1969	10 November 1972	Francisco Franco	Giuseppe Saragat		Malta
José Antonio Giménez-Arnau	7 December 1972	10 August 1976	Francisco Franco	Giovanni Leone		Malta
Carlos Robles Piquer	8 October 1976	27 April 1979	Adolfo Suárez	Giovanni Leone		Malta
Gabriel Cañadas Nouvillas	1 June 1979	3 September 1982	Adolfo Suárez	Sandro Pertini		
José Aragonés Vila	24 September 1982	6 May 1983	Leopoldo Calvo-Sotelo	Sandro Pertini		
Jorge de Esteban Alonso	6 May 1983	17 July 1987	Felipe González	Sandro Pertini		
Emilio Menéndez del Valle	17 July 1987	29 April 1994	Felipe González	Francesco Cossiga		Albania San Marino
María de las Mercedes Rico	3 June 1994	23 August 1996	Felipe González	Oscar L. Scalfaro		Albania San Marino
Juan Prat y Coll	23 August 1996	2 June 2000	José María Aznar	Oscar L. Scalfaro		Albania San Marino Malta
José de Carvajal Salido	16 June 2000	23 December 2004	José María Aznar	Carlo A. Ciampi		Albania San Marino Malta
José Luis Dicenta Ballester	23 December 2004	21 September 2007	José L. Rodríguez Zapatero	Carlo A. Ciampi		Albania San Marino
Luis Calvo Merino	29 October 2007	15 July 2011	José L. Rodríguez Zapatero	Giorgio Napolitano		San Marino
Alfonso Lucini Mateo	15 July 2011	30 March 2012	José L. Rodríguez Zapatero	Giorgio Napolitano		San Marino
Francisco Javier Elorza Cavengt	20 April 2012	9 December 2016	Mariano Rajoy	Giorgio Napolitano		San Marino
Jesús Manuel Gracia Aldaz	20 January 2017	7 September 2018	Mariano Rajoy	Sergio Mattarella		San Marino
Alfonso María Dastis Quecedo	7 September 2018	11 October 2022	Pedro Sánchez	Sergio Mattarella		San Marino
Miguel Ángel Fernández-Palacios	12 October 2022	Incumbent	Pedro Sánchez	Sergio Mattarella		San Marino

== See also ==
- Spain – Italy relations
- Foreign relations of Spain
