= Francisco Merry y Colom =

Spanish diplomat

Francisco Merry y Colom Count of Benomar
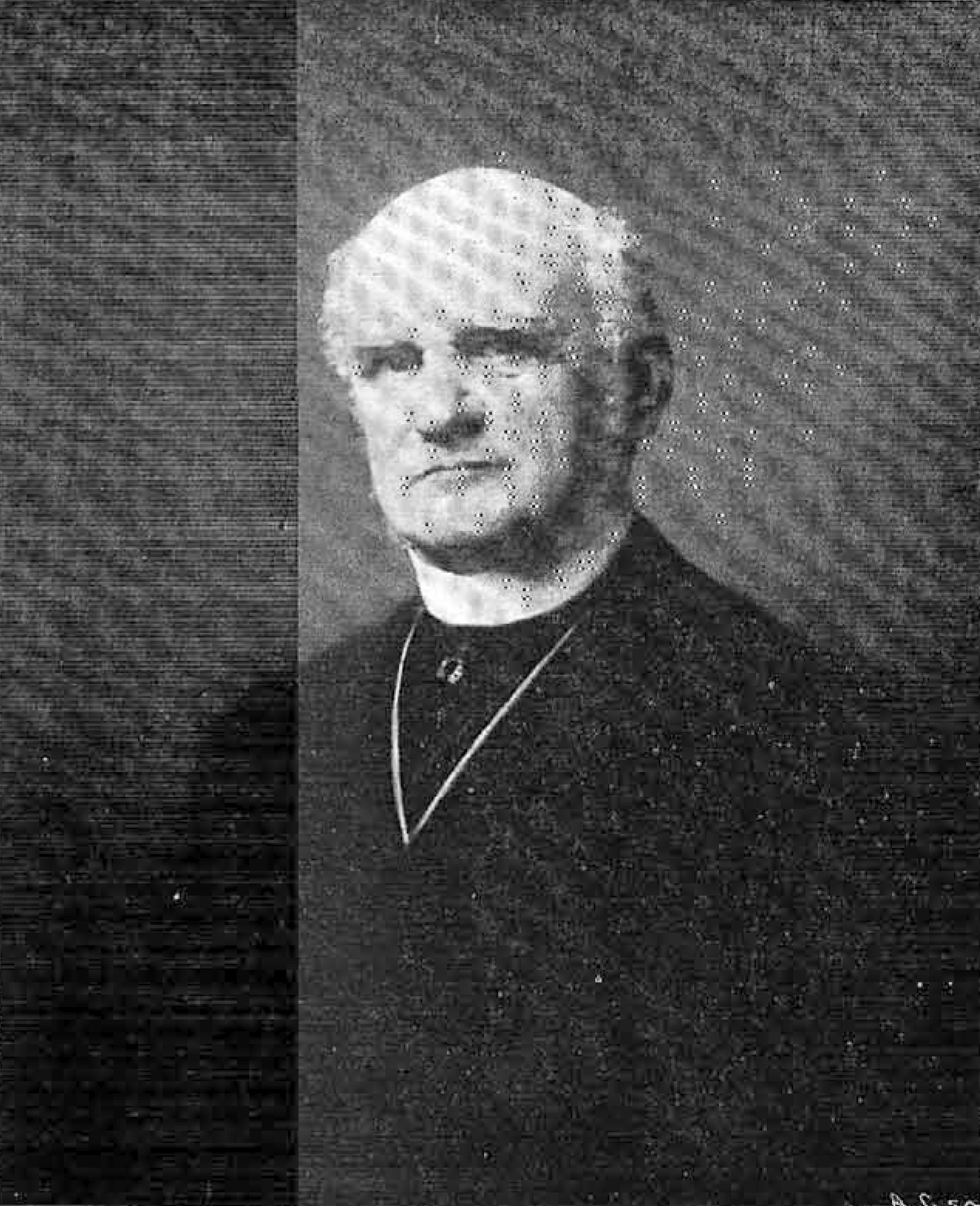
- Portrayed in La Ilustración Española y Americana, 1905

Spanish Ambassador to Italy
- In office April 10, 1899 – May 4, 1900
- Preceded by: Cipriano del Mazo y Gherardi
- Succeeded by: Enrique Dupuy de Lôme
- In office July 10, 1895 – November 16, 1897
- Preceded by: Juan Antonio de Rascón
- Succeeded by: Cipriano del Mazo y Gherardi
- In office August 24, 1890 – January 31, 1893
- Preceded by: Cipriano del Mazo y Gherardi
- Succeeded by: Juan Antonio de Rascón

Spanish Ambassador to Germany
- In office 1875–1888

Personal details
- Born: 1 May 1829; Seville, Spain
- Died: 4 January 1900 (aged 70); Rome, Italy
- Relations: Rafael Carlos Merry del Val (cousin)
- Children: María del Carmen Merry y López de la Torre Ayllón

Francisco Merry y Colom, 1st Count of Benomar (1 May 1829 – 4 January 1900) was a Spanish diplomat. He served as Spanish representative in Morocco after the Hispano–Moroccan War, travelling to Marrakesh in 1863. Later in his career, he also served as Ambassador in Berlin and Rome. He was the Spanish representative in the Berlin Conference.

== Early life ==
Merry y Colom was born in Seville on 1 May 1829. He was the son of Antonio Merry y Gayté and Dolores Colom y Osorio. His paternal grandparents were Joseph Merry and Manuela Gayté y Escobar. Through his paternal uncle, Rafael Merry y Gayté, he was a first cousin of fellow diplomat Rafael Carlos Merry del Val (father of the Spanish Ambassador to the United Kingdom Alfonso Merry del Val, 1st Marquess of Merry del Val, and Rafael Merry del Val, the Cardinal Secretary of State to Pope Pius X).

== Career ==
He began his diplomatic career in 1849, serving as diplomatic attaché at the Ministry of State and later in Washington. Following the start of the War of Africa (the Hispano–Moroccan War), he was destined near the military leadership in the conflict and was involved in the negotiations of the peace settlements. He was appointed chargé d'affaires and Consul general in Tangier in 1860.

In February 1863, he was summoned by General Serrano, the then Minister of State in the O'Donnell government (and a victor in the War), to lead a diplomatic mission near the Moroccan Sultan. Eventually, the new Foreign minister, Manuel Pando, briefed Merry with the specific goals for his mission. Those included the rehabilitation of Muley El-Abbás, the sultan's hispanophile brother, the fostering of commercial activity in Ceuta and Melilla by means of the creation of a custom, the opening of the Port of Agadir to Spanish ships, facilitating the meat provision to Ceuta, and the improvement on the status of Spaniards in Morocco. Upgraded to the rank of Minister–Resident, Merry thus travelled to Tangier, and then to Marrakesh and back to Tangier from May to July 1863. In his time in the Court of Mohammed IV, Merry helped to establish the basis for peacetime commercial and diplomatic relations with the Sherifian Empire.

Following his time in Africa, Merry was appointed as Minister Plenipotentiary to Berlin, where he was upgraded to the rank of Ambassador. Alfonso XII granted Merry the nobiliary title of Count of Benomar in 1878. He also served two times as Ambassador to the Kingdom of Italy.

== Personal life ==
Merry y Colom was married to Dame Bernardina López de la Torre Ayllón y Jaspe (1847–1924), a daughter of the Spanish Minister of State, Luis López de la Torre Ayllón and Josefa Jaspe y Macías. Together, they were the parents of:

- María del Carmen Merry y López de la Torre Ayllón (b. 1881), who married Friedrich Johann von Seidler, Baron von Seidler in Rome in 1911.

He died in Rome on 4 January 1900. His daughter succeeded him as Countess of Benomar.

=== Legacy ===
While informed of a Euro-centric worldview, his diaries about his experience in 1863 (edited in 1984 in Madrid under the title Mi embajada extraordinaria a Marruecos en 1863) constitutes a source of great historiographical value both for the understanding of the Hispano–Moroccan relations and for observations on geographical, demographic, social, economic, cultural and political features of the country.
