= Cipriano Muñoz, 2nd Count of la Viñaza =

Spanish diplomat and academic

The Most Excellent Cipriano Muñoz 2nd Count of the Viñaza GE
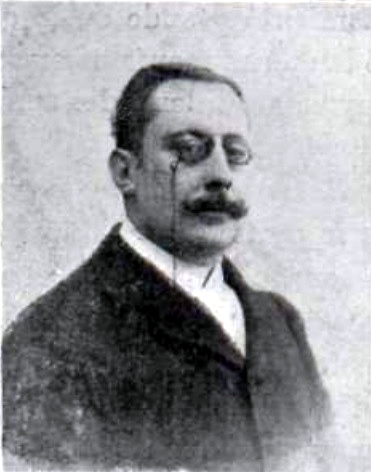
- Born: Cipriano Muñoz y Manzano; 3 October 1862; Zaragoza, Spain
- Died: 24 November 1933 (aged 71); Biarritz, France

Seat L of the Real Academia Española
- In office 16 June 1895 – 24 November 1933
- Preceded by: Zeferino González y Díaz Tuñón (Note: González was elected for the position in 1893 but never took the seat)
- Succeeded by: Ramiro de Maeztu

Cipriano Muñoz y Manzano, 2nd Count of the Viñaza (Zaragoza, 3 October 1862 – Biarritz, France, 24 November 1933) was a Spanish diplomat and academic who served as a deputy to the Spanish Congress and published notable works on linguistics, philology, and art history.

== Biography ==
He was the son of Cipriano Muñoz y Ostaled, first Conde de La Viñaza, a Spanish countship awarded on 27 November 1871 by the brief-reigning King Amadeo I of Spain. He studied Law and Philosophy at Zaragoza University and earned a Doctoral degree in Philosophy from the University of Madrid.

Muñoz was Congressional deputy for Ejea de los Caballeros, Zaragoza, from 1891 to 1893, 1893 to 1894, and 1894 to 1896. He served later as Spanish Ambassador in Russia and Italy. He became Senator for the province of Huesca and, on 15 November 1910, a grandee of Spain.

He was enrolled a member of the Royal Spanish Academy in 1895, aged 33, lecturing at his appointment reception on satirical–political poetry in Spanish literature. He was a member also of the Royal Spanish Academy of History, lecturing at his appointment reception on the Chroniclers of the Kingdom of Aragon. He was awarded the Great Cross with Diamonds of the Russian Order of Saint Alexander Nevsky, and received honors also from Portugal, Italy, Austria, Belgium, Peru, Serbia, Bulgaria, and other countries.

He died in Biarritz, France, aged 71.

Here is an excerpt from "Movimiento nobiliario para 1934":

"El 24-noviembre-1933 falleció en Biarritz don Cipriano Muñoz Manzano, Conde de la Viñaza, Grande de España, Embajador de S. M., Gentilhombre de Cámara de S. M. con ejercicio y servidumbre, Senador del Reino por derecho propio, individuo de número de las Academias Española y de la Historia, Collar de Carlos III, Grandes Cruces de Leopoldo de Bélgica, San Alejandro Nevsky (Rusia), San Mauricio y San Lázaro (Italia), Isabel la Católica, Mérito Militar, Beneficencia, etc. Viuda, hijos e hijos políticos" (Page 8)

== Publications ==
Muñoz wrote a number of books, some of which remain influential in the history of the Spanish language today.

- Bibliografía Española de Lenguas Indigenas de América (Spanish bibliography of indigenous American languages), Madrid, Ed. Sucesores de Rivadeneyra, xxv + 427 pages, 1892, reprinted by Father Carmelo Sáenz de Santa María, 1977: ISBN 978-84-363-0495-4. A catalogue of 1,100 works in indigenous American languages with Spanish translations, printed from the 16th to 19th centuries. The bibliography includes profiles of the works' authors, many Spanish-born or mixed race bilingual descendants of Spanish and Indian parents. Many of the books concern the teaching of Christianity in aboriginal American languages.
- Escritos de los portugueses y castellanos referentes a las lenguas de China y del Japón: estudio bibliográfico por el conde de la Viñaza, Cipriano Muñoz y Manzano (Portuguese and Castilian writings on the languages of China and Japan: a bibliographic study for the conde de la Viñaza, Cipriano Muñoz y Manzano. Published: Lisboa, M. Gomez and also London, B. Quaritch, 1892. A Collection of Studies on the Chinese and Japanese Languages Carried Out by Spanish and Portuguese Travelers and Settlers from the Sixteenth to the Nineteenth Centuries.

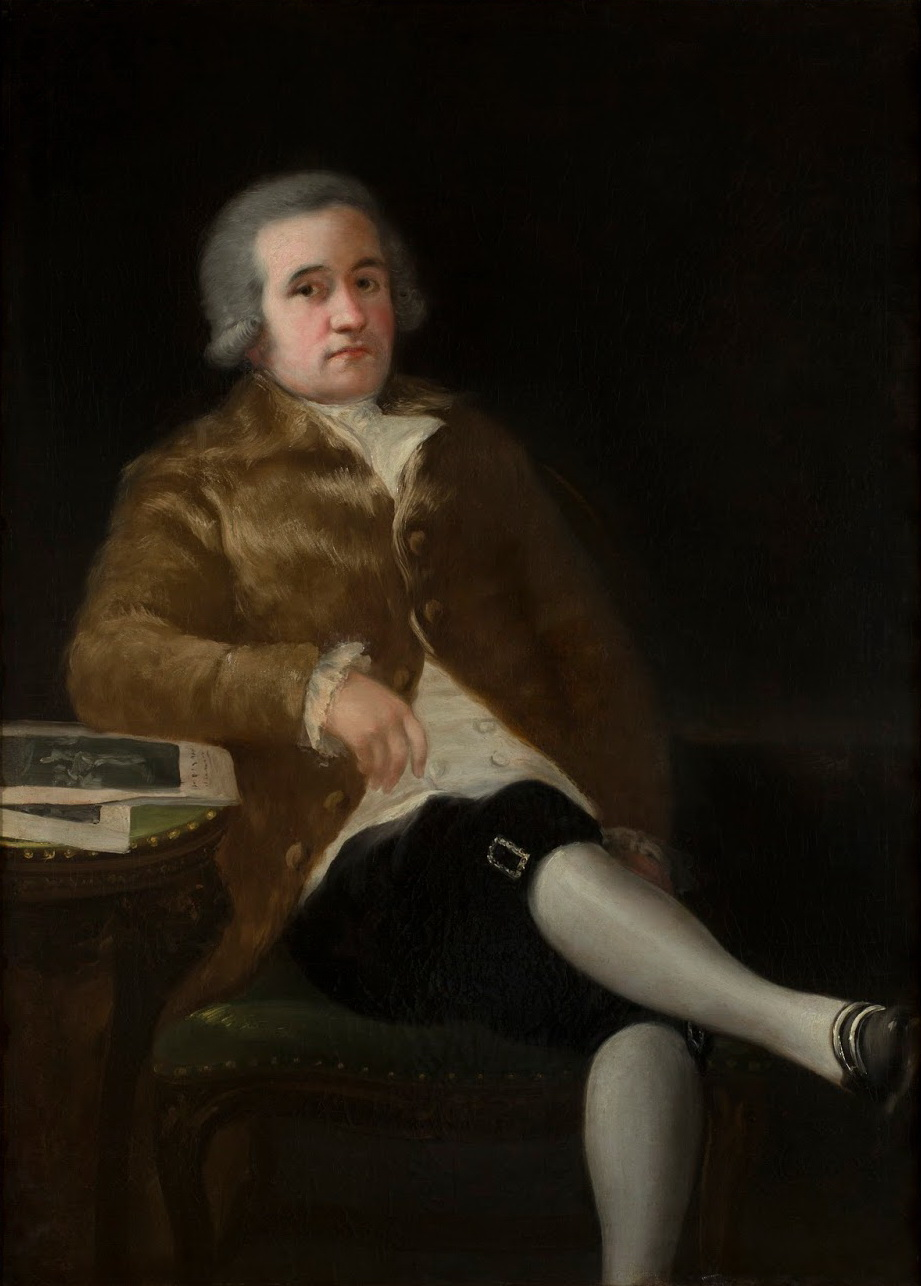
Painter and Art Historian Juan Agustin Ceán Bermudez, (1749–1829), painted by Francisco de Goya

- Poesía satírico – política bajo el Reinado de los últimos Austrias, Discurso de Ingreso en la Real Academia Española del 16 de junio 1893, contestación del Académico Alejandro Pidal. An account of political gossip, libels and poems circulated at the Madrid Court during the second half of the 17th century.
- Biblioteca Histórica de la Filología Castellana. 3 vols., Imprenta de Manuel Tello, Madrid (1893); facsimile by Linotipias Montsarrat, Ediciones Atlas, Madrid (1978), XXXV + 1113 pp.
- Santa Teresa de Jesús: Ensayo Crítico (Santa Teresa de Jesús: A Critical Essay), por el Conde de la Viñaza.
- Adiciones al "Diccionario histórico de los muy ilustres profesores de Bellas Artes en España" de Ceán Bermúdez. An Expansion on the Much Sought After and Rare 6-Volume Edition of the Year 1800 on Over Three Centuries of Spanish Artists, Mainly Painters, by Juan Agustín Ceán Bermúdez, (Gijón, 17 September 1749 – Madrid, 3 December 1829). The original volumes have been reprinted by Ediciones Akal, Madrid (2001), ISBN 84-460-1617-6

Art historians have credited him as the first Spaniard to produce a catalogue of the works of Aragonese painter Francisco de Goya.

== Notes ==
| Preceded by | Ambassador of Spain in Belgium; 1895–1898 | Succeeded by |
| Preceded by | Ambassador of Spain in Portugal; 1904–1905 | Succeeded by |
| Preceded by James Fitz-James Stuart, 2nd Duke of Berwick | Ambassador of Spain in Rusia; 1904–1905 | Succeeded by Marcelino Pascua |
| Preceded by Luis Polo de Bernabé Pilón | Ambassador of Spain to the Holy See; 1913–1916 | Succeeded by Wenceslao Ramírez de Villa-Urrutia, 1st Marquis of Villa-Urrutia |
| Preceded by Antonio Vargas Laguna | Ambassador of Spain in Italy; 1924–1931 | Succeeded by Gabriel Alomar i Villalonga |
