= Diego Coello de Portugal y Quesada =

Spanish diplomat, politician and journalist

His Excellency Diego Coello de Portugal y Quesada Count Coello de Portugal
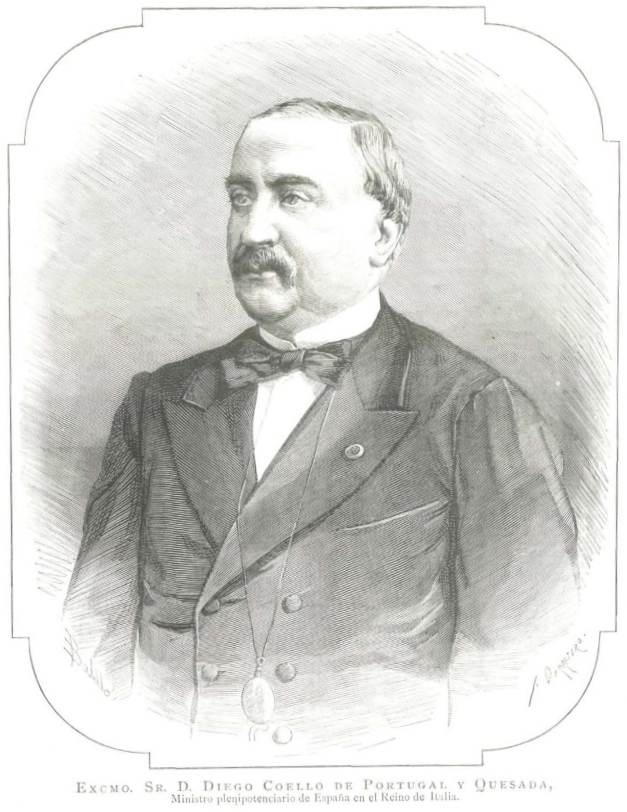
- Portrait published in The Spanish and American Illustration, 1880

Spanish Ambassador to Italy
- In office 30 May 1875 – 4 March 1881
- Preceded by: Manuel Rancés y Villanueva
- Succeeded by: Cipriano del Mazo y Gherardi

Personal details
- Born: 19 August 1820 Jaén, Spain
- Died: 5 April 1897 (aged 76) Rome, Italy
- Political party: Liberal Union (1846–1876); Liberal Conservative (from 1876)
- Relations: Rafael Coello y Oliván (nephew)
- Parent(s): Diego Coello de Portugal y Ramírez; Josefa de Quesada

Diego Coello de Portugal y Quesada (19 August 1820 – 5 April 1897) was a Spanish diplomat, politician and journalist.

== Early life ==
Coello was born on 19 August 1820 in Jaén into an aristocratic family. He was the eldest son of Don Diego Coello de Portugal y del Castillo and Doña Josefa de Quesada y Vial. Among his fifteen siblings were Lt.-Col. of Engineers Francisco Coello de Portugal y Quesada (1822–1898) and Lt.-Gen. José Coello de Portugal y Quesada (1830–1906), whose son, Gen. Rafael Coello y Oliván, was Minister of the Interior and Governor of Zaragoza.

== Career ==
After studying law in Seville, he became interested in politics and entered the Foreign service in 1844.

He served as Liberal Deputy for Jaén in 1846, 1850 and 1854, for the Canary Islands in 1857, for Jaén and Segovia in 1858, and again for Jaén in 1863 and 1864. He later became a monarchist, dynastic, sincere Catholic, and Liberal Conservative was a member of the Senate for Jaén in 1876 and, for life, from 1877 to 1880.

In 1849, he was a founder of the Liberal evening newspaper La Época in Madrid, and served as a director from 1849 to 1866. While he was abroad, he collaborated with La Época, La Illustration Española y Americana, New York News, El Diario de Barcelona and El Diario de la Marina de La Habana.

=== Diplomatic career ===
From 1858 to 1860, he served as Spanish ambassador in Turin (the capital of the Kingdom of Sardinia), then as the ambassador in Brussels (the capital of the Kingdom of Belgium) from 1860 to 1862, then as the ambassador in Switzerland between 8 September 1862 and 1 February 1864, followed by the ambassador to Portugal in 1864. In 1868, he requested that he be dismissed as ambassador to Portugal, transferred the direction of La Época to Emilio Castelar and accompanied Queen Isabella II into exile in France. On 17 May 1875, he was granted the title Count of Coello de Portugal.

From 30 May 1875 until 4 March 1881, he was the ambassador in Rome (the capital of the Kingdom of Italy). In 1884, he became the diplomatic representative of Spain in the Ottoman Empire, succeeding his friend the Count of Rascón.

=== Later life ===
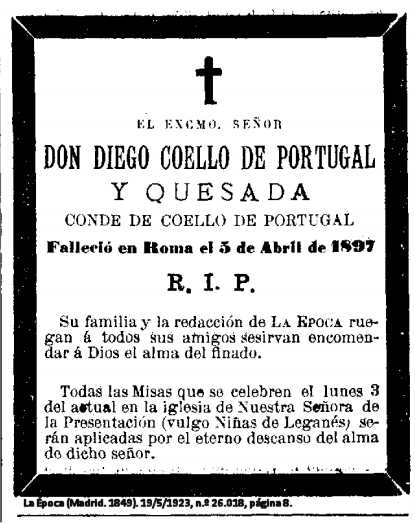
Death notice, 1897

In 1873, he founded the Spanish Academy of Fine Arts in Rome which was concerned with the restoration of other buildings belonging to the Spanish State. After his retirement in 1890, he remained in Rome as the head of the Commission of the Pious Places of Jerusalem.

== Personal life ==
Coelle died in Rome on 5 April 1897. His title was inherited by his nephew, Gen. Rafael Coello y Oliván, in 1899.
