= List of ambassadors of Spain to Switzerland =

Ambassador of Spain to Switzerland
- Coat of arms of Spain
- Incumbent; Enrique Ignacio Mora Benavente since 4 December 2025
- Ministry of Foreign Affairs; Secretariat of State for the European Union
- Style: The Most Excellent
- Residence: Bern
- Nominator: The Foreign Minister
- Appointer: The Monarch
- Term length: At the government's pleasure
- Inaugural holder: Lope de Soria
- Formation: 1513
- Website: Mission of Spain to Switzerland

The ambassador of Spain to Switzerland is the official representative of the Kingdom of Spain to the Swiss Confederation. It is also accredited to the Principality of Liechtenstein.

Spain and Switzerland have maintained diplomatic relations since 1513, when the viceroy of Naples, Ramón de Cardona, in the name of Ferdinand the Catholic, King of Aragon and Regent of Castile, sent Lope de Soria to negotiate an alliance with the Old Swiss Confederacy in the context of the War of the League of Cambrai. With only a few interruptions, relations have been maintained for five centuries, and, since 1957, the diplomatic representative has always held the rank of Ambassador Extraordinary and Minister Plenipotentiary.

== Jurisdiction ==
- Switzerland: The Swiss Confederation is the main jurisdiction of the Embassy in Bern. Spain has three consulates-general in the country, headquartered in Bern, Geneva and Zurich.

The ambassador is also accredited to:

- Liechtenstein: Historically, the ambassador in Switzerland has been responsible for diplomatic and consular relations with Liechtenstein, either through the consulate general in Zurich or directly through the Embassy.

Also, in the 19th century, the ambassador also represented Spanish interests before several German states, such as the Grand Duchy of Baden (1863–1867 and 1868–1875), the Kingdom of Bavaria (1863–1867), the Free City of Frankfurt (1855–1862), the Grand Duchy of Hesse (1860–1862 and 1866), the Duchy of Nassau (1860–1862) and the Kingdom of Württemberg (1863–1867).

== List of ambassadors ==
This list was compiled using the work "History of the Spanish Diplomacy" by the Spanish historian and diplomat Miguel Ángel Ochoa Brun. The work covers up to the year 2000, so the rest is based on appointments published in the Boletín Oficial del Estado.

Name	Rank	Term
Lope de Soria	Ambassador	1513–1514
Maximiliano de Bergkcz	Envoy	1518–1519
Hieronymus Baldung	Co–Envoys	1519
Johann Teubler	Co–Envoys	1519
Max von Siebenberg	Co–Envoys	1519
Hans Acker	Co–Envoys	1519
Rudolf von Sultz	Co–Envoys	1519
Wolf von Honberg	Co–Envoys	1519
Jakob Stürtzel	Co–Envoys	1519
Hieronymus Brunner	Envoy	1519
Conde de Sultz	Envoy	1520
The Duke of Mecklenburg	Co–Envoys	1521
Maximilianus Transylvanus	Co–Envoys	1521
Veit Sutor	Envoy	1522
Wolfgang Pratner	Co–Envoys	1522
Rafael of Medici	Co–Envoys	1522
Hieronymus Baldung	Envoy	1523
Lope de Soria	Envoy	1524
Jacob Stürtzel	Envoy	1525
Antonio de Leyva, Duke of Terranova	Envoy	1526
Cornelis de Schepper	Envoy	1531
Leonard de Gruyère	Envoy	1533–1536
François de Bonvalot	Envoy	1534
Battista de l’Isola	Envoy	1535–1538
The Lord of Marnoy	Envoy	1536–1538
Giovanni Francesco Panizono	Agent	1539–1547
Girolamo Rozono	Agent	1547
Giovanni Angelo Rizio	Agent	1549–1556
Ascanio Marso	Envoy	1549–1556
Marc de Rye, Marquess of Varambon	Envoy	1557
Sancho de Londoño	Envoy	1564
Marco Antonio Bossi	Envoy	1559–1565
Marc de Rye, Marquess of Varambon	Envoy	1559–1565
Baltasar de Molina	Envoy	1565
Giovanni de Anguisola	Resident Envoy	1565–1569
Pompeo della Croce	Resident Envoy	1568–1594
Antonio Arduino	Envoy	1585–1594
Alfonso Casati,Count of Borgolavezzaro	Resident Envoy	1594–1621
Julio de la Torre	Agent	1602
Girolamo Casati	Resident Envoy	1621–1624
Claude de Rye, Baron of Balançon	Co–Ambasadors	1624–1629
Marc-Claude de Rye, marchese di Dogliani	Co–Ambasadors	1624–1629
Carlo Manuel Casati	Resident Envoy	1629–1645
Diego de Saavedra Fajardo	Special Envoy	1638–1642
Antonio Sarmiento, Count of Crescente	Envoy	1639
Juan de Velasco, Count of Siruela	Envoy	1642
Giovanni Francesco Casati	Resident Envoy	1646–1667
Alfonso Casati	Resident Envoy	1667–1681
Giovanni Francesco Arese	Acting Resident Envoy	1681–1682
Enea Crivelli	Resident Envoy	1683–1686
Carlo Casati y Melzi	Resident Envoy	1686–1703
Lorenzo Verzuso Beretti Landi	Resident Envoy	1703–1716
Tullio Pelizari	Agent	1704
Franz Ehrenreich von Trauttmannsdorff (Note: Representing Archduke Charles, future Charles VI, Holy Roman Emperor, during the War of the Spanish Succession.)	Envoy	1704–1711
Konrad Kreinzlind	Envoy	1709
Félix Cornejo y Alemán	Minister	1717–21
Félix Cornejo y Alemán	Minister	1726–33
Miguel de Caparroso	Chargé d'affaires	1733–1734
Juan Blas Jover y Alcázar	Minister	1743–1744
Muniain	Minister	1744
José Carpintero	Minister	1744–1747
Miguel de Caparroso	Chargé d'affaires a.i.	1747–1751
Manuel de Caparroso	Chargé d'affaires a.i.	1751–1757
Demetrio Mahony, Count of Mahony	Minister	1757–1758
Francisco González de Bassecourt, Marquess of Grigny	Minister	1766–1769
José Caamaño	Minister	1791–1800
Gaspar María de Nava, Count of Noroña	Minister	1800–1802
José López de la Torre Ayllón	Chargé d'affaires	1802
José Caamaño (Note: Representing Joseph Bonaparte from 1808 to 1811.)	Minister	1802–1811
José Ferreira	Chargé d'affaires	1810–1813
Pascual Vallejo	Minister	1814–1817
Luis Martínez Viérgol	Minister	1818–1822
Luis Fernández Mon	Minister	1824–1825
Cecilio de Corpas	Minister	1825
Félix Ramón Alvarado	Chargé d'affaires	1825–1826
Fernando de Navia	Minister	1826–1827
Manuel María de Aguilar	Chargé d'affaires	1827
José Álvarez de Toledo y Dubois	Minister	1827–1828
Mariano Carnerero	Minister	1840–1842
Diego de la Cuadra	Chargé d'affaires	1842–1843
Luis López de la Torre Ayllón y Kirsmacker	Chargé d'affaires	1843
Diego de la Cuadra	Chargé d'affaires	1845–1846
Francisco María Marín	Minister	1846–1847
José Neviet	Minister	1847–1849
The Minister to the German Confederation		1855–1863
The Minister to the Belgium		1863
José Heriberto García de Quevedo	Chargé d'affaires	1863–1864
José Heriberto García de Quevedo	Minister	1864–1866
Jesús Muñoz y Sánchez, Marquess of Remisa	Minister	1866
The Minister to France		1867
Manuel Cortina y Rodríguez, Marquess of Cortina	Chargé d'affaires	1867–1869
Manuel Cortina y Rodríguez, Marquess of Cortina	Minister	1869–1873
Gumersindo de la Rosa	Chargé d'affaires	1873
Carlos Martra	Minister	1873–1874
Pedro Pascual de Oliver	Minister	1874
Isidoro Hoyos y de la Torre, Marquess of Hoyos	Minister	1875–1876
Mariano Remón Zarco del Valle y Balez, Marquess of Zarco	Minister	1876
Narciso García Loygorri, Duke of Vistahermosa	Chargé d'affaires	1877–1880
Melchor Sangro Rueda, Count of Almina	Minister	1881–1890
Germán María de Ory	Minister	1898–1899
José de la Rica y Calvo	Minister	1905–1907
Pedro de Prat y Agacino	Minister	1907–1908
Miguel Álvarez y Moya, Count of Chacón	Minister	1908–1913
Francisco de Reynoso y Mateo	Minister	1913–1923
Emilio de Palacios y Fau	Minister	1923–1926
Mauricio López-Roberts, Marquess of Torrehermosa	Minister	1926–1930
Manuel Aguirre de Cárcer	Minister	1930–1933
Alfonso Fiscowich y Gullón	Minister	1933–1934
Julio López Oliván	Minister	1934–1936
José María Aguinaga y Barona	Minister	1936
Luis Martínez-Merello y del Pozo (Note: Representing the Junta Técnica del Estado.)	Chargé d'affaires	1936
Antonio Fabra (Note: Representing the Republic government.)	Minister	1936–1939
Bernabé Toca y Pérez de la Lastra	Resident Envoy	1937–1938
Pablo de Churruca y Dotres	Minister	1939–1942
Luis Calderón y Martín	Minister	1942–1951
José María Ruiz de Arana y Baüer, Duke of Sanlúcar la Mayor	Minister	1951–1954
Alonso Álvarez de Toledo y Mencos, Marquess of Miraflores	Minister	1954–1957
Alonso Álvarez de Toledo y Mencos, Marquess of Miraflores	Ambassador	1957–1961
Juan Pablo de Lojendio e Irure, Marquess of Vellisca	Ambassador	1951–1969
José Felipe de Alcover y Sureda	Ambassador	1969–1973
José Miguel Ruiz Morales	Ambassador	1973–1974
Nicolás Martín Alonso	Ambassador	1975–1979
Adolfo Martín-Gamero	Ambassador	1979–1985
Juan Luis Pan de Soraluce y Olmos, Count of San Román	Ambassador	1985–1987
Joaquín Martínez-Correcher y Gil, Count of Sierragorda	Ambassador	1987–1992
Federico Garayalde Emparan	Ambassador	1992–1995
Fernando Arias-Salgado	Ambassador	1996–2000
Juan Manuel Egea Ibáñez	Ambassador	2000–2003
Gonzalo de Benito Secades	Ambassador	2003–2007
Fernando Riquelme Lidón	Ambassador	2007–2010
Miguel Ángel de Frutos Gómez	Ambassador	2010–2014
Bernardo de Sicart Escoda	Ambassador	2014–2017
Aurora Díaz-Rato Revuelta	Ambassador	2017–2020
Victorio Redondo Baldrich	Ambassador	2020–2021
María Celsa Nuño García	Ambassador	2021–2025
Enrique Ignacio Mora Benavente	Ambassador	2025–pres.

== See also ==
- Spain–Switzerland relations
