= Alomar =

Alomar is a surname. Notable people with the surname include:

- Carlos Alomar (born 1951), American guitarist, composer and arranger
- Gabriel Alomar i Villalonga (1873–1941), Spanish poet, essayist, and educator
- Any of three members of a prominent family of Puerto Rican baseball players, all now retired from play:
  - Sandy Alomar Sr. (1943–2025), second baseman and coach, and family patriarch
  - Sandy Alomar Jr. (born 1966), catcher and oldest son of Sandy Sr.
  - Roberto Alomar (born 1968), second baseman and younger son of Sandy Sr.
