= Luis Polo de Bernabé =

Spanish diplomat

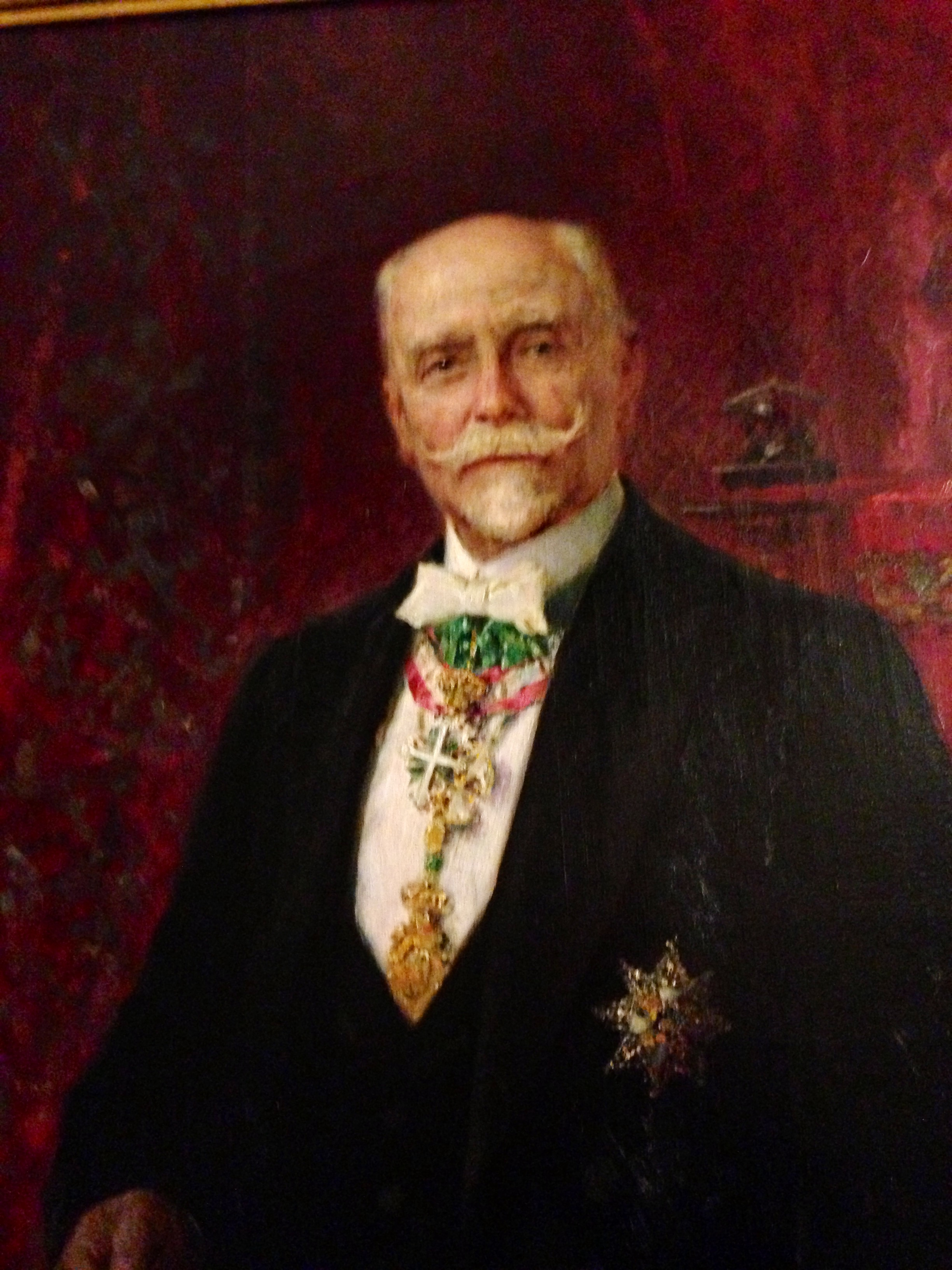
Luis Polo de Bernabé y Pilón by Modest Teixidor y Torres (1922)

Luis Polo de Bernabé y Pilón (14 October 1854 – 18 March 1929) was a Spanish diplomat.

== Early life ==
Polo de Bernabé was born on 14 October 1854 in London. He was a son of Carolina Pilón y Sterling and Rear Admiral José Polo de Bernabé y Mordella (1821–1895). His paternal grandparents were Luis Polo de Bernabé y Mundina and María Mordella.

== Career ==
Polo de Bernabé began his diplomatic career in Washington, D.C. as an attaché to the Embassy, which was led at the time by his father. Upon his father's retirement in 1875, he was promoted to Third Secretary, in which he served for six years. In 1882, he was appointed Second Secretary to the legation in The Hague. After three years, he went to the Foreign Office in Madrid shortly before being made Minister Plenipotentiary. His first station in that capacity was in Cairo, after which he went to Rio de Janeiro until 1893. In Madrid, he served as Chief of the Commercial Bureau in the Spanish Foreign Department, dealing with commercial matters and Consulates.

=== Minister to the United States ===
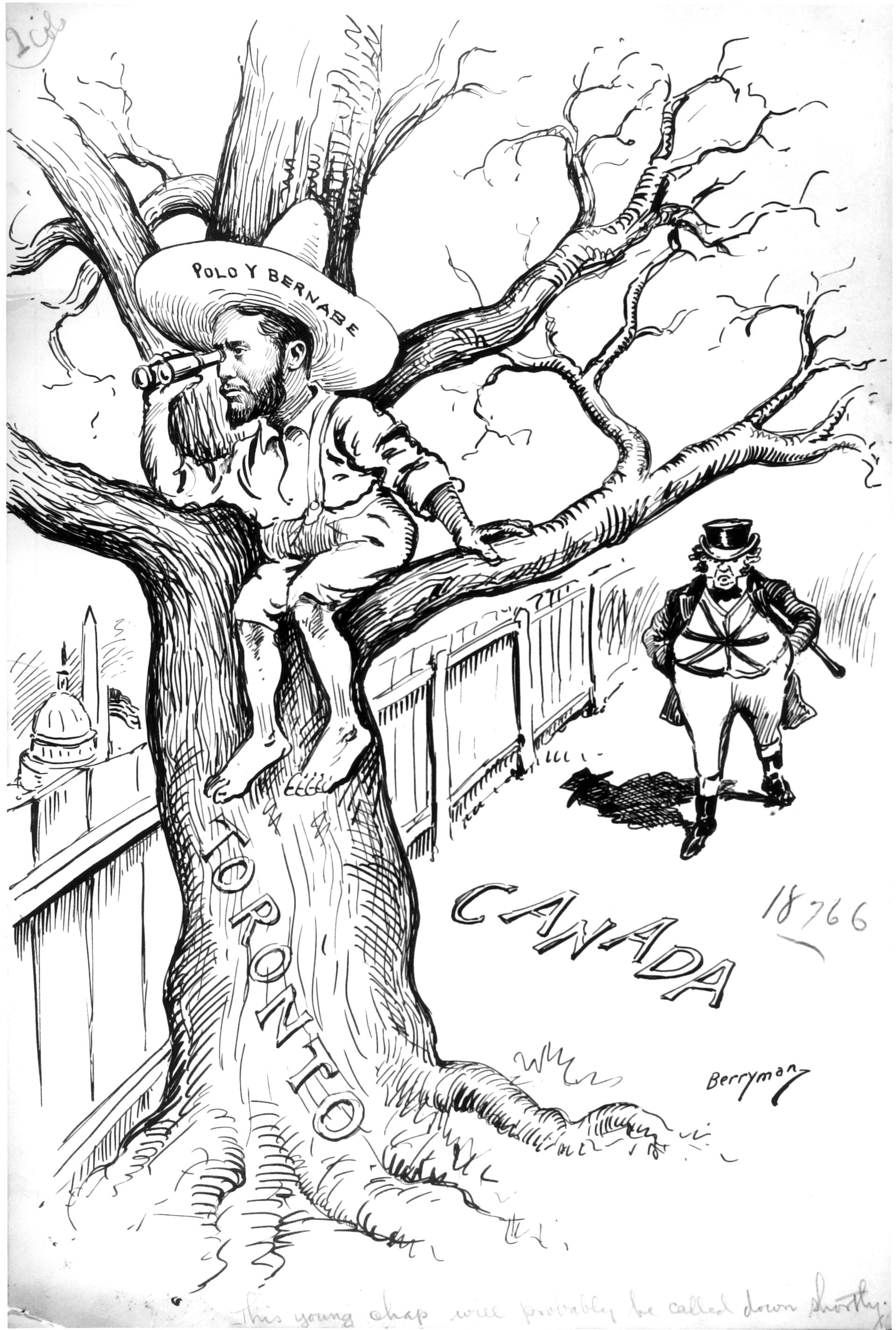
1898 political cartoon by Clifford K. Berryman

Polo de Bernabé was appointed Minister to the United States on 16 February 1898, three days after the blowing up of the Maine battleship in Havana Harbor. He arrived in the United States on 9 March 1898 aboard the Kaiser Wilhelm II, taking charge of the embassy. Polo was unable to make up for the actions of his predecessor, Enrique Dupuy de Lôme, before the declaration of war against Spain's Sagasta administration by President William McKinley. After receiving the declaration of war from U.S. Secretary of State John Sherman, he "immediately replied that the resolution was of such a nature that his continuance in Washington became impossible. He asked for his passports and stated that the protection of Spanish interests would be intrusted to the French Ambassador and the Austro-Hungarian Minister. His passports were sent to him; and he was at the same time informed that arrangements had been made for a guard to attend him during his presence in the territory of the United States."

=== Ambassador to Portugal and Italy ===
After a mission in Lisbon in 1899, he was sent by the Maura government to the Quirinal Palace as the Spanish Ambassador to Italy on 21 July 1904. He stayed in Rome until 20 March 1905 when he left his post to return to Portugal as the Ambassador in Lisbon. His return to Lisbon was, however, short-lived.

=== Ambassador to the United Kingdom ===
In 1905, he was transferred to London as the Ambassador to the United Kingdom. While Ambassador, he involved in the treaty around the marriage of King Alfonso XIII and Princess Victoria Eugenie of Battenberg (a granddaughter of Queen Victoria), which he executed in London on 7 May 1906 as the Spanish Ambassador to the Court of St James's, along with the British Foreign Secretary, Sir Edward Grey. He also attended the wedding on 31 May 1906 at the Church of Saint Jerome the Royal in Madrid.

=== Ambassador to the German Empire ===
In 1906, he was again transferred, this time to what was considered the most important position for any diplomat, as Ambassador to the German Empire. On 7 September 1906, Polo de Bernabé presented his credentials to Emperor Wilhelm II. (Note: As Ambassador to the German Empire, he diplomatically represented Spain to the Kings of Bavaria, Saxony, Württemberg and the Grand Dukes of Baden and Mecklenburg-Strelitz, among other States that constitute the German Empire.) His command of the German language and the social standing of his wife, Ana María Méndez de Vigo (daughter of the former Ambassador to Germany), opened the doors to members of the Hohenzollern family. His anti-Americanism and Francophobia then emerged as a response to the growing hostility that the governments in Washington, D.C. and London showed towards the expansionary policy of the Holy Roman Empire.

At the beginning of World War I, Polo de Bernabé watched Germany's initial triumphs and recognized the thousands of Allied captives interned on German soil. In November 1914, he visited the prison camps in Brandenburg and Saxony, and harshly criticized the lack of assistance of the Imperial authorities. Due to his friendship with Wilhelm II, together with his well-known pan-Germanism, most of his objections were addressed. There was a noted lack of conflict with the Bethmann Hollweg government and those of his successors, Michaelis and Hertling. His efforts resulted in French prisoners being allowed to write to their families two letters a month, plus three postcards per week, upon which the French Government implemented a similar position for German captives.

Known for his authoritarian nature, Polo de Bernabé was considered a fearsome diplomat for Madrid. Not only did he discuss the orders of successive Foreign Ministers, the Marquis of Lema, Miguel Villanueva, Amalio Gimeno, Juan Alvarado, Eduardo Dato, the Count of Romanones, but he even questioned the appointment of new delegates in Germany by King Alfonso XIII himself.

The defeat of Erich Ludendorff's armies in August 1918 convinced Polo de Bernabé that Imperial Germany was coming to an end. When German's last chancellor, Prince Maximilian of Baden, forced Wilhelm II's abdication, Polo de Bernabé remained in Berlin for a few months while his replacement, Pablo Soler y Guardiola, the Ambassador in Buenos Aires, arrived. Upon his return to Spain, he retired from the diplomatic service.

== Personal life ==
He was married to Ana María Méndez de Vigo, daughter of Felipe Méndez de Vigo, the Ambassador to Germany during the last years of the 19th century. In 1898, Polo de Bernabé was described as follows:

"Señor Polo is a short, squat man, with iron gray hair and full Spanish beard. His face is broad, and his mouth firm and large, and seems to wear an almost perpetual smile. He is a fine linguist, and has many other accomplishments, being a prolific writer, especially on commercial matters, to which he has devoted careful study."

Señor Polo de Bernabé died of a cerebral hemorrhage in Madrid on 18 March 1929.

=== Honours and awards ===
He was awarded a Grand Cross of the Order of Charles III, Grand Cross of the Order of Isabella the Catholic, Grand Cross of the Order of the Red Eagle. He was also awarded the Order of the Bath and Victoria of England of the Order of Christ of Portugal and many others.

Diplomatic posts
Preceded by Enrique Dupuy de Lôme	Spanish Minister to the United States; 1898	Succeeded by José Brunetti
Preceded by	Spanish Minister to Portugal; 1899–1904	Succeeded by
Preceded by Enrique Dupuy de Lôme	Spanish Ambassador to Italy; 1904–1905	Succeeded by Antonio de Castro y Casaléiz
Preceded by	Spanish Ambassador to Portugal; 1905–1905	Succeeded by
Preceded by Fermín Lasala y Collado	Spanish Ambassador to the United Kingdom; 1905–1906	Succeeded by Wenceslao Ramírez de Villa-Urrutia
Preceded by Ángel de Ruata y Sichar	Spanish Ambassador to the German Empire; 1906–1918	Succeeded by Pablo Soler y Guardiola
