= Luis Caroz =

Spanish ambassador

Luis Caroz was a Spanish diplomat. He was the imperial ambassador to the court of Henry VIII of England between 1509 and 1514. He represented Ferdinand of Aragon, the King's father-in-law as Henry's wife at the time was Catherine of Aragon.
