= List of ambassadors of Spain to the United Kingdom =

This is a List of Ambassadors of Spain to England and to the United Kingdom

== Introduction ==
Charles V, Holy Roman Emperor sent ambassadors to England representing the Empire, as well as Spain. When the Catholic Reformation began, Spain was in the opposite camp to Protestant England.

In the second half of the seventeenth century, Spain sometimes supported the English because, like them, it feared the hegemony in Europe that France and its king Louis XIV had achieved after the Treaty of the Pyrenees (1659).

After the Frenchman Philip of Anjou became King of Spain in 1700, during most of the eighteenth century, Spain again stood on the side of France, and was an opponent of Great Britain. It was not until the French Revolution that the two conservative countries, Spain and Great Britain, reconciled against the revolutionaries.

== Spanish ambassadors, envoys and ministers plenipotentiary to England (1514–1707) ==
=== 15th century ===
- 1483–1483 Jofre de Sasiola (1st term)
- 1485–1489 Rodrigo González de la Puebla (1st term)
- 1491–1492 Jofre de Sasiola (2nd term)
- 1494–1508 Rodrigo González de la Puebla (2nd term)
- 1497–1500 Pedro de Ayala (1st term)
- 1498–1498 Sancho de Londoño and Fray Tomás de Matienzo
- 1499–1499 Don Juan Manuel, lord of Belmonte
- 1499–1499 Hernán Duque de Estrada (1st term)

=== 16th century ===
- 1500–1500 Gutierrez Gomez de Fuensalida (1st term)
- 1501–1502 Don Pedro de Ayala (2nd term)
- 1502–1504 Hernán Duque de Estrada (2nd term)
- 1507–1510 Catherine of Aragon
- 1508–1509 Gutierrez Gomez de Fuensalida (2nd term)
- 1509–1514 Luis Caroz
- 1514–1522 Bernardo de Mesa
- 1516–1516 George of Theimseke
- 1518–1519 Jean Jonglet (1st term)
- 1519–1520 Philip Haneton, señor de Lindt
- 1520–1520 John III of Glymes
- 1520–1520 Laurent de Gouvenot
- 1522–1525 Louis of Praet
- 1525–1525 Jean La Sauche
- 1525–1525 Adolf of Burgundy
- 1525–1525 Ferry Laureyns
- 1525–1525 Rodrigo de Peñalosa Toledo
- 1525–1526 Jean Jonglet (2nd term)
- 1526–1529 Iñigo López de Mendoza y Zúñiga
- 1529–1545 Eustace Chapuys
- 1536–1538 Diego Hurtado de Mendoza
- 1539–1540 Philippe Maioris
- 1543–1543 Ferrante Gonzaga
- 1544–1544 Beltrán de la Cueva, 3rd Duke of Alburquerque
- 1544–1550 François van der Delft
- 1545–1545 Baudoin de Lannoy
- 1547–1547 Thomas Perrenot de Granvelle
- 1549–1549 Diego Hurtado de Mendoza
- 1549–1549 Juan III de Silva
- 1550–1553 Jean Scheyfve
- 1553–1555 Simon Renard
- 1553–1554 Jehan de Montmorency
- 1554–1554 Lamoral, Count of Egmont
- 1554–1554 Charles II de Lalaing
- 1554–1554 Philippe Negri
- 1554–1554 Pedro de Ávila y Zúñiga
- 1558–1558 Christophe d´Assonleville
- 1558–1559 Gómez Suárez de Figueroa y Córdoba, 1st Duke of Feria
- 1559–1559 Christophe d´Assonleville
- 1559–1563 Álvaro de la Quadra
- 1559–1559 Caspar Breuner, barón de Rabenstein:
- 1559–1559 Don Juan de Ayala
- 1560–1560 Philippe de Stavele
- 1560–1560 Juan Pacheco de Toledo
- 1563–1563 Christophe d´Assonleville
- 1564–1568 Diego Guzmán de Silva
- 1568–1572 Guerau de Espés
- 1569–1569 Christophe d´Assonleville
- 1569–1569 Chiappino Vitelli
- 1572–1578 Antonio de Guarás
- 1574–1574 Bernardino de Mendoza (1st term)
- 1578–1584 Bernardino de Mendoza (2nd term)
- 1584–1603 Anglo-Spanish War (1585–1604)

=== 17th century ===
- 1603–1604 Juan de Tassis, 1st Count of Villamediana
- 1603–1604 Charles de Ligne, 2nd Prince of Arenberg
- 1604–1604 Carlos Coloma (1st term)
- 1605–1609 Pedro de Zúñiga y de la Cueva
- 1609–1613 Alonso de Velasco y Salinas
- 1612–1612 Pedro de Zúñiga y de la Cueva (2nd term)
- 1612–1622 Diego Sarmiento de Acuña, Count of Gondomar
- 1623–1624 Juan de Mendoza, Marquis de la Hinojosa
- 1624–1624 Diego Sarmiento de Acuña, Count of Gondomar (2nd term)
- 1624–1624 Diego Hurtado de Mendoza y Guevara
- 1622–1624 Carlos Coloma (2nd term)
- 1627–1630 Peter Paul Rubens
- 1629–1631 Carlos Coloma (3rd term)
- 1632–1636 Íñigo Vélez de Guevara, 8th Count of Oñate
- 1638–1655 Alonso de Peralta y Cárdenas
- 1640–1641 Antonio Sancho Davila, Marquis of Velada
- 1640–1641 Virgilio Malvezzi
- 1655–1660 Anglo-Spanish War (1654–1660)
- 1660–1662 Alonso Rancano
- 1660–1660 Jean Charles de Watteville
- 1660–1660 Claude Lamoral, 3rd Prince of Ligne
- 1660–1662 Charles Watteville de Joux
- 1663–1665 Patricio Moledi
- 1665–1672 Antonio de Tobar y Paz
- 1671–1674 Pedro de Velasco y Tovar
- 1674–1676 Pedro Ronquillo Briceño (1st term)
- 1675–1677 Jean-Baptiste de Brouchoven
- 1676–1677 Bernardo Salinas
- 1677–1680 Carlo Emmanuel d'Este
- 1678–1679 Louis Philip of Egmont
- 1679–1691 Pedro Ronquillo Briceño (2nd term)
- 1685–1685 Sebastián de Andía y Henríquez
- 1691–1691 Francisco Antonio Navarro
- 1690–1699 Manuel Coloma Escolano

== Spanish ambassadors, envoys and ministers plenipotentiary to Great Britain ==
=== 18th century ===
- 1700–1712 War of the Spanish Succession
- 1712–1713 Isidro Casado de Acevedo y Rosales
- 1713–1714 Patrick Lawless (chargé d’affaires)
- 1714–1718 Isidro Casado de Acevedo y Rosales (2nd term)
- 1720–1727 Jacinto de Pozobueno y Belver
- 1724–1724 Isidro Casado de Acevedo y Rosales (3rd term)
- 1727–1731 Anglo-Spanish War (1727–1729)
- 1731–1735 Cristóbal Gregorio Portocarrero, 5th Count of Montijo
- 1735–1739 Thomas Geraldino
- 1739–1747 War of Jenkins' Ear
- 1746–1746 Jerónimo Grimaldi (1st term)
- 1747–1754 Ricardo Wall
- 1752–1752 Jerónimo Grimaldi (2nd term)
- 1754–1760 Félix José de Abreu Bertodano
- 1760–1761 Joaquín Atanasio Pignatelli
- 1762–1763 Jerónimo Grimaldi (3rd term)
- 1763–1763 Francisco Javier Carrión Ribas
- 1763–1777 Vittorio Filippo Ferrero Fieschi
- 1772–1775 Francisco de Escarano y Torres
- 1777–1778 Francisco de Escarano y Torres
- 1778–1779 Pedro Francisco de Luján y Góngora, 1st Duke of Almodóvar del Río
- 1779–1783 Anglo-Spanish War (1779–1783)
- 1782–1783 Ignacio de Heredia Alemán
- 1783–1795 Bernardo del Campo y Pérez de la Serna
- 1795–1796 Simón de las Casas y Aragorri
- 1796–1796 José Senra

=== 19th century ===
- 1802–1803 Miguel de Larrea
- 1802–1804 José J. de Anduaga Garimberti
- 1808–1808 José María Queipo de Llano, 7th Count of Toreno
- 1808–1809 Francisco Sangro
- 1808–1811 Juan Ruiz de Apodaca, 1st Count of Venadito
- 1808–1808 Francisco Martínez de la Rosa
- 1808–1808 Francisco Serralde
- 1809–1809 Adrián Jacome
- 1809–1810 Pedro de Cevallos Guerra
- 1810–1810 José Miguel de la Cueva, 14th Duke of Alburquerque
- 1811–1812 Pedro de Alcántara Álvarez de Toledo, 13th Duke of the Infantado
- 1812–1817 Carlos José Gutiérrez de los Ríos
- 1817–1817 Joaquín Campuzano Morentes
- 1817–1820 José Miguel de Carvajal-Vargas, 2nd Duke of San Carlos
- 1820–1820 Santiago de Usoz Mozzi
- 1820–1821 Bernardino Fernández de Velasco, 14th Duke of Frías
- 1821–1822 Luis de Onís
- 1822–1824 Juan Gabriel de Jabat
- 1824–1824 Francisco Cea Bermúdez (1st term)
- 1824–1825 Camilo Gutiérrez de los Ríos
- 1825–1826 Mateo de la Serna Santander
- 1825–1826 Fernando de Aguilera y Contreras
- 1826–1828 Narciso Heredia, Count of Ofalia
- 1828–1828 Carlos Cruzmayor
- 1828–1832 Francisco Cea Bermúdez (2nd term)
- 1832–1833 Antonio López de Córdoba
- 1833–1834 Juan de Vial Eydeli
- 1834–1834 Manuel de Pando, 6th Marquess of Miraflores (1st term)
- 1834–1834 Ignacio de Jabat (1st term)
- 1834–1835 Miguel Ricardo de Álava (1st term)
- 1835–1836 Ignacio de Jabat (2nd term)
- 1836–1838 Manuel María de Aguilar
- 1838–1838 Manuel de Pando, 6th Marquess of Miraflores (2nd term)
- 1838–1841 Miguel Ricardo de Álava (2nd term)
- 1841–1841 Luis de Flores
- 1841–1841 Antonio González, 1st Marquess of Valdeterrazo (2nd term)
- 1841–1844 Vicente Sancho del Castillo
- 1844–1844 Fernando Rodríguez Ribas
- 1844–1844 Miguel Tacón y Rosique (1st term)
- 1844–1844 Manuel de la Pezuela, 2nd Marquess of Viluma
- 1844–1847 Ignacio Jaime de Sotomayor y Zatrillas
- 1847–1848 Miguel Tacón y Rosique (2nd term)
- 1848–1848 Francisco Javier de Istúriz (1st term)
- 1850–1854 Francisco Javier de Istúriz (2nd term)
- 1854–1854 Juan Tomás Comyn (1st term)
- 1854–1856 Antonio González, 1st Marquess of Valdeterrazo (2nd term)
- 1856–1857 Juan Tomás Comyn (2nd term)
- 1856–1858 Luis González Bravo
- 1858–1862 Francisco Javier de Istúriz (3rd term)
- 1862–1863 Augusto Conte Lerdo de Tejada
- 1862–1863 Antonio González, 1st Marquess of Valdeterrazo (3rd term)
- 1863–1865 Juan Tomás Comyn (3rd term)
- 1865–1865 José Gómez-Acebo y de la Torre
- 1865–1866 Mariano Roca de Togores, 1st Marquess of Molins
- 1866–1868 Ángel García-Loygorri
- 1868–1869 Gorgonio Petano Mazariegos
- 1869–1869 Gabriel García de Tassara
- 1869–1869 Miguel Bertodano y Pattisson
- 1869–1872 Manuel Rancés y Villanueva
- 1872–1873 Segismundo Moret y Prendergast
- 1873–1873 José Argaiz Vildósola
- 1873–1873 Federico Rubio Gali
- 1873–1873 Buenaventura de Abarzuza y Ferrer
- 1873–1875 Juan Tomás Comyn (4th term)
- 1875–1875 Enrique Vallés Soler
- 1875–1886 Manuel Rancés y Villanueva
- 1886–1888 Cipriano del Mazo Gherardi
- 1888–1890 José Luis Albareda y Sezde
- 1890–1893 Manuel Rancés y Villanueva
- 1892–1895 Cipriano del Mazo Gherardi
- 1895–1897 Emilio Alcalá-Galiano, 4th Count of Casa Valencia
- 1897–1900 Juan Antonio Rascón Navarro

=== 20th century ===
- 1900–1905 Fermín Lasala Collado
- 1905–1906 Luis Polo de Bernabé y Pilón
- 1905–1913 Wenceslao Ramírez de Villa-Urrutia, 1st Marquis of Villa-Urrutia
- 1913–1931 Alfonso Merry del Val
- 1931–1936 Ramón Pérez de Ayala
- 1936–1936 Julián López y Oliván
- 1936–1939 Pablo de Azcárate
- 1939–1945 Jacobo Fitz-James Stuart, 17th Duke of Alba
- 1945–1948 Domingo de las Bárcenas
- 1948–1951 José Ruiz de Arana y Bauer
- 1951–1958 Miguel Primo de Rivera
- 1958–1972 José Fernández-Villaverde
- 1972–1973 Jaime de Piniés
- 1973–1975 Manuel Fraga Iribarne
- 1975–1976 Manuel Gómez-Acebo e Igartua
- 1976–1981 Luis Guillermo Perinat y Elío, 8th Marquess of Campo Real
- 1981–1983 Fernando Arias-Salgado y Montalvo
- 1983–1990 José Joaquín Puig de la Bellacasa
- 1990–1992 Felipe de la Morena y Calve
- 1992–1999 Alberto Aza y Arias

=== 21st century ===
- 1999–2004 Santiago de Mora-Figueroa y Williams
- 2004–2008 Carlos Miranda y Elíof
- 2008–2009 Carles Casajuana i Palet
- 2009–2012 José Ignacio Carbajal Gárate
- 2012–2017 Federico Trillo-Figueroa
- 2017–2021 Carlos Bastarreche
- 2021–2025 José Pascual Marco Martínez
- 2025–present Emma Aparici Vázquez de Parga

== See also ==
- Spain – United Kingdom relations
- Foreign relations of Spain
- List of ambassadors of the United Kingdom to Spain
