= Ventura García-Sancho, Marquess of Aguilar de Campoo =

Mexican-Spanish nobleman and politician

The Marquess of Aguilar de Campoo

Ventura García-Sancho e Ibarrondo, 1st Count of Consuegra (20 April 1837, in Mexico City, Mexico – 20 July 1914, in Madrid, Spain) better known by his spouse's title Marquess of Aguilar de Campoo, was a Mexican-Spanish nobleman and politician who served twice as Minister of State and as Mayor of Madrid between 1899 and 1900.

== Family and origins ==
Ventura Crisóforo Domingo Ignacio García-Sancho e Ibarrondo was born in Mexico City on 20 April 1837, the son of don José Marcial García-Sancho y Sánchez-Leñero, knight of the Ilustre Solar de Tejada, and of doña María de la Trinidad de Ibarrondo y Maruri, both from Guadalajara (México) and members of well-stablished families of Spanish origin.

During his youth, don Ventura and his family moved to Bordeaux, France, where decades before his maternal grandparents (the Basque don Domingo de Ibarrondo y Urraza, and the Mexican-criolla doña María Ignacia de Maruri y Berrueco) had lived. After his mother's death in 1846, don Ventura began to spend lengthy stays in Spain in the company of his paternal grandfather, don José Ventura García-Sancho y Moreno de Tejada (who was from Lumbreras, Spain).

After studying industrial engineering in Paris, he joined the Liberal Union, a political party with which he participated in the 1863 elections, winning a seat in the Cortes (Parliament) for the Cartagena constituency in Murcia.

Following the Sexenio Democrático, he left the Liberal Union in 1874 and joined the Conservative Party, which he would remain a member of for the rest of his political career.

In March 1899, with the victory of the Conservative Party, he was appointed Mayor of Madrid, a position he held until 18 April 1900, when he was appointed Minister of Foreign Affairs, as which he served until 6 March 1901. In 1902, he was appointed president of the Council of State, a position he held until 1904, when he would again be Minister of Foreign Affairs between 16 December 1904 and 27 January 1905.

He was also a member of the Senate between 1891 and his death in 1914.

== Marriage and offspring ==
He married in Madrid on 2 June 1861 María del Pilar de Zavala, daughter of Juan de Zavala, 1st Marques of Sierra Bullones and María del Pilar de Guzmán, 24th Duchess of Nájera. Through his marriage, he became Grandee of Spain. In 1871, María del Pilar succeeded her uncle Isidro Zacarías de Guzmán y de la Cerda as the 20th Marchioness of Aguilar de Campoo.

They were the parents of:

1. Doña María del Pilar García-Sancho y Zavala (1864-1916), 27th Duchess of Nájera (GE), 21st Marchioness of Aguilar de Campoo (GE), V Marchioness of Sierra Bullones (GE), 21st Countess of Paredes de Nava (GE), 21st Countess of Oñate (GE), 18th Marchioness of Quintana del Marco, 10th Marchioness of Guevara, Countess of Treviño, 7th Marchioness of Torreblanca, 11th Countess of Castañeda, 2nd Countess of Consuegra. She married don Leopoldo Travesedo y Fernández-Casariego, son of the Counts of Maluque (with issue).
2. Doña María de la Trinidad García-Sancho y Zavala (1866-1950), 20th Countess of Paredes de Nava (GE), married Juan Díaz de Bustamante y Campuzano, 2nd Marquess of Herrera, no issue.
3. Doña María del Milagro García-Sancho y Zavala (1874-1959), 15th Marchioness of Montealegre. She first married don Antonio Morenés y García-Alessón, 1st Marquess of Ceballos-Carvajal (with issue), and secondly don Francisco de Urruela y Lara.

== Honors ==
- Count of Consuegra
- Mayordomo Mayor of the Queen
- Caballerizo Mayor of the Queen
- Tutor and Chief of Staff of the infanta doña Cristina
- Chief of Staff of the infanta doña María Teresa
- Knight of the Sovereign Order of Malta
- Knight Grand Cross of the Order of Isabel la Católica (1893).
- Knight Grand Cross of the Order of Carlos III.
- Knight of the Collar of the Order of Carlos III (elevated in 1908).
- Knight Grand Cross of the Order of the Légion d'Honneur (France).
- Knight Grand Cross of the Imperial Order of the Iron Crown (Austria-Hungary).
- Knight Grand Cross of the Order of Christ (Portugal).
- Knight Grand Cross of the Order of Leopold (Belgium).
  Political offices
  Preceded by Francisco Silvela	Minister of State; 18 April 1900 – 6 March 1901	Succeeded by The Duke of Almodóvar del Río
  Preceded by Faustino Rodríguez-San Pedro	Minister of State; 16 December 1904 – 27 January 1905	Succeeded by Wenceslao Ramírez de Villa-Urrutia
  Spanish nobility
  New creation	Count of Consuegra; 1906–1914	Succeeded by María del Pilar García-Sancho

== Sources ==
- Salazar y Acha, Jaime de (2012). Los Grandes de España (siglos XV-XVI). Ediciones Hidalguía. ISBN 978-84 939313-9-1.
