= Count of Consuegra =

Countship of Consuegra
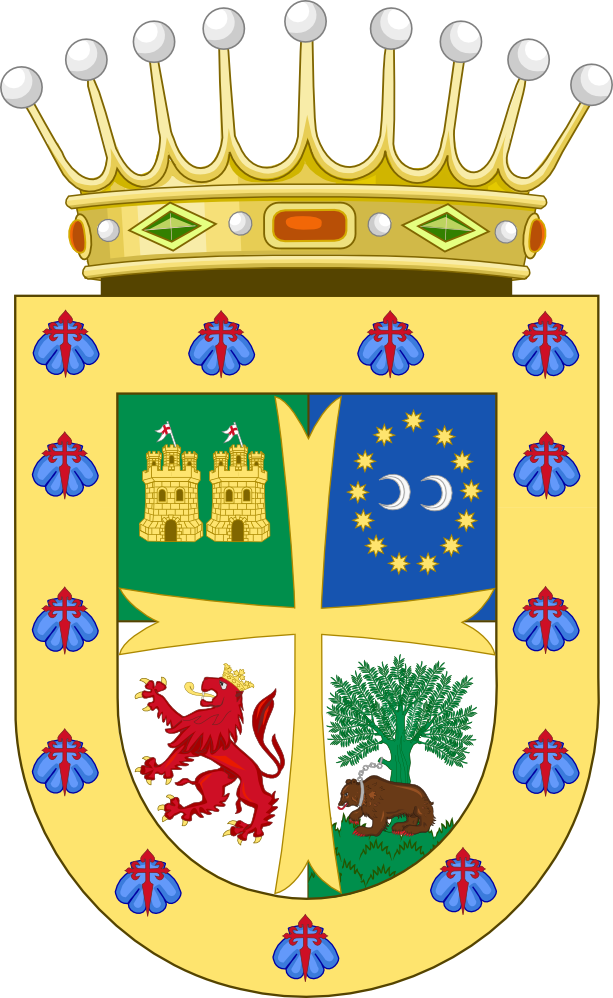
- Creation date: 10 October 1905
- Created by: Alfonso XIII
- First holder: Ventura García-Sancho Ibarrondo
- Present holder: Jaime Travesedo y Juliá, 7th Count of Consuegra
- Remainder to: Heirs of the body of the grantee
- Status: Extant

Count of Consuegra (Spanish: Conde de Consuegra) is a hereditary title of Spanish nobility. It was created on 10 October 1905 by King Alfonso XIII in favor of Ventura García-Sancho Ibarrondo, a politician.

== Counts of Consuegra ==
- Ventura García-Sancho Ibarrondo, 1st Count of Consuegra (1906–1914)
- María del Pilar García-Sancho y Zavala, 2nd Countess of Consuegra (1915–1916)
- Alfonso Travesedo y García-Sancho, 3rd Count of Consuegra (1919–1922)
- Francisco Travesedo y García-Sancho, 4th Count of Consuegra (1923–1933)

Upon his death, the title remained dormant. Revived in 1991.

- José María Travesedo y Martínez de las Rivas, 5th Count of Consuegra (1991–1993)
- Juan de Travesedo y Colón de Carvajal, 6th Count of Consuegra (1994–2003)
- Jaime Travesedo y Juliá, 7th Count of Consuegra (2003- )
