= Eduardo Gutiérrez Sáenz de Buruaga =

Spanish diplomat (1958–2026)

Eduardo Gutiérrez Sáenz de Buruaga (24 February 1958 – 24 January 2026) was a Spanish diplomat. He was ambassador to the Holy See from 2012 to 2017 and to Portugal from 2017 to 2018. Gutiérrez Sáenz de Buruaga was born in Madrid on 24 February 1958, and died there on 24 January 2026, at the age of 67.
