= Italy–Spain relations =

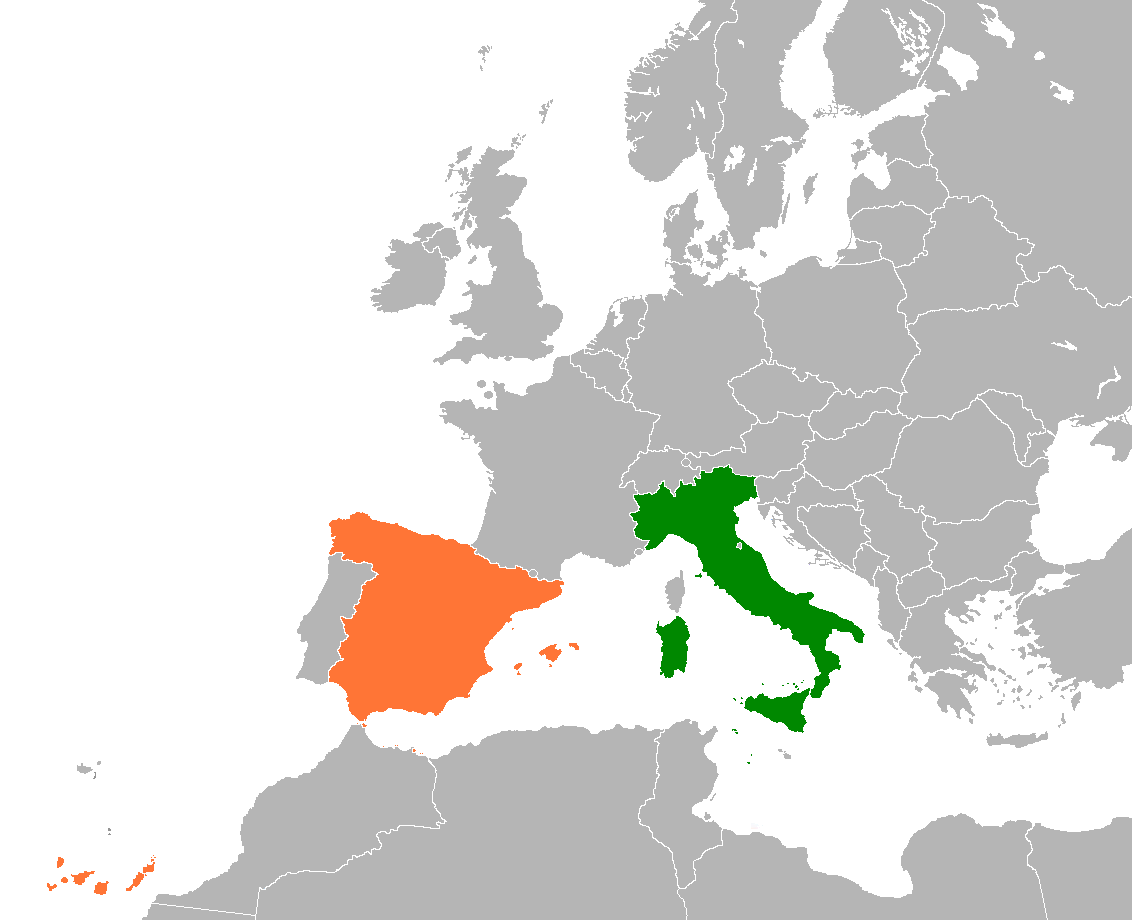
- Italy: Spain

Diplomatic mission
- Embassy of Italy, Madrid: Embassy of Spain, Rome

Italy and Spain maintain interstate relations. Both countries established diplomatic relations some time after the unification of Italy in 1861.

Both nations are member states of the European Union (and both nations use the euro as currency) and are both members of the Council of Europe, OECD, NATO, Union for the Mediterranean, and the United Nations.

== History ==
=== Precedents ===
In 218 BC, the Romans, coming from Italy, conquered the Iberian Peninsula, which later became the Roman province of Hispania. The Romans introduced the Vulgar Latin, the ancestor of the Romance languages, which are spoken in both current-day countries of Italy and Spain. As a result of the conquest, mining extractive processes in the southwest of the peninsula (which required a massive number of forced laborers, initially from Hispania and later also from the Gallic borderlands and other locations of the Mediterranean), increased by leaps and bounds, bringing the interaction of slaving and ecocide, entailing far-reaching environmental outcome in terms of pollution records, unmatched in the Mediterranean region until the Industrial Revolution. Vis-à-vis the local aristocracies in Hispania, a long process consisting of the fusion of incoming Roman and Italic settlers and the romanized indigenous elites was chiefly completed by the 1st century CE. It had involved the granting of Roman citizenship to entire communities. Some of the members of the local aristocracies of the Baetica managed to insert themselves into the social and political structures of the High Roman Empire.

Rome's imperial authority over Hispania receded and was ultimately severed in the 5th century, during the Migration period. The Rome-based Latin Church would go on to hold nonetheless substantial clout over Christian polities of the Peninsula for the rest of the Middle Ages.

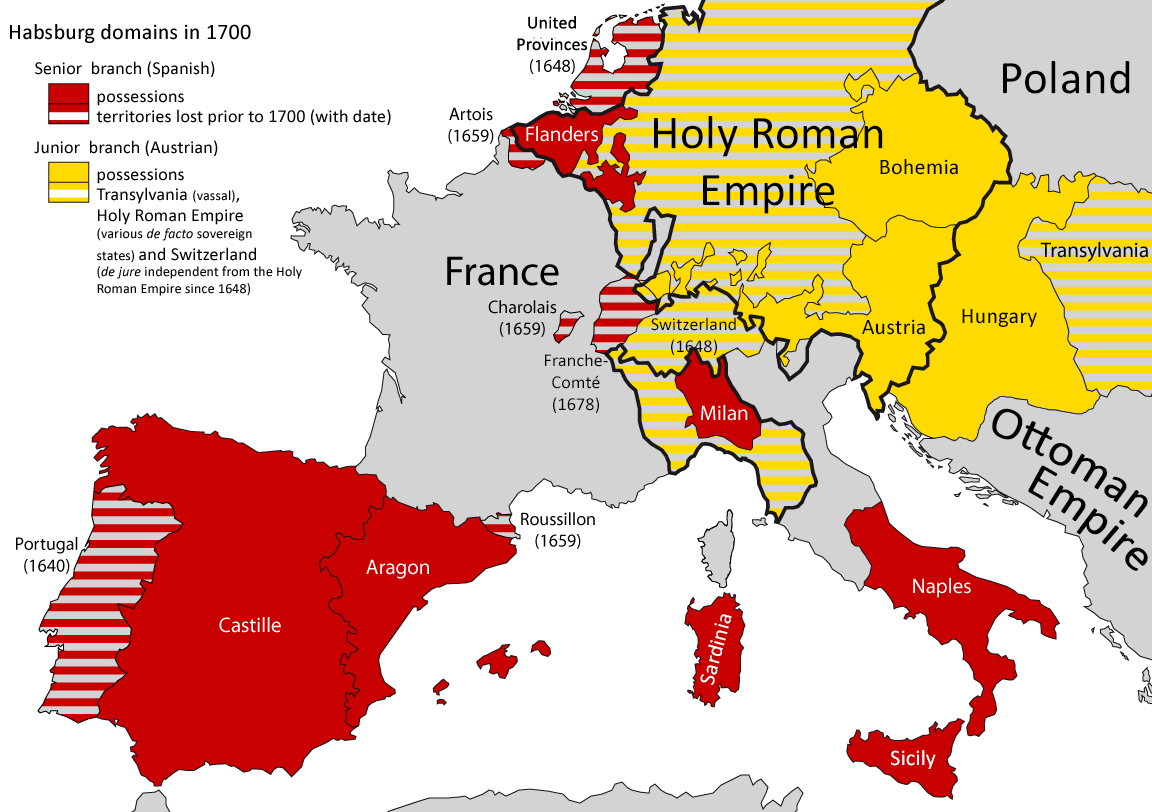
Habsburg possessions in Spain and Italy in 1700

After 1557, the Kingdom of Sicily, the Kingdom of Naples, and the Duchy of Milan under the Catholic Monarchy hitherto ruled by the Council of Aragon became ruled by the newly created Council of Italy, as a cog of the polysynodial system underpinning the administration of the Habsburg empire, a composite monarchy. The Kingdom of Sardinia remained for the time being ruled by the Council of Aragon. The Council of Italy was dissolved for good in the wake of the Peace of Utrecht.

=== Establishment of diplomatic relations ===
After the proclamation of Victor Emmanuel II as King of Italy in 1861 Spain failed to initially recognise the country, still considering Victor Emmanuel as the "Sardinian King". The recognition was met by the opposition of Queen Isabella II of Spain, influenced by the stance of Pope Pius IX. Once Leopoldo O'Donnell overcame the opposition of the Queen, Spain finally recognised the Kingdom of Italy on 15 July 1865. Soon later, in 1870, following the dethronement of Isabella II at the 1868 Glorious Revolution, the second son of Victor Emmanuel II, Amadeo I, was elected King of Spain, reigning from 1871 until his abdication in 1873.

=== Situation after World War I ===
Despite some incipient attempts to promote further understanding between the two countries, immediately after the end of World War I, there were still issues restraining further Italian-Spanish engagement in Spain. This includes a sector of public opinion showing aversion towards Italy; a prominent example being Austria-born Queen Mother Maria Christina.

=== Rapprochement between the Mediterranean dictatorships ===
Once dictators Benito Mussolini (1922) and Miguel Primo de Rivera (1923) got to power, conditions for closer relations became more clear, with the notion of a rapprochement to Italy becoming more interesting to the Spanish Government policy, particularly in terms of the profit those improved relations could deliver to Spain vis-à-vis the Tangier question. For Italy, the installment of the dictatorship of Primo de Rivera offered a prospect for greater ascendancy over a country with a government now widely interested in the reforms carried out in Fascist Italy. Relations during this period were often embedded in a diplomatic triangle between France, Italy, and Spain. While showing a will for friendship and rapprochement, the "Treaty for Conciliation and Arbitration" signed in August 1926 between the two countries delivered limited substance in practical terms, compared to the expectations at the starting point of the Primorriverista dictatorship.

A diplomatic "honeymoon" between the two regimes followed the signing of the treaty, nonetheless.

=== Conspirations against the Spanish Republic ===
The early monarchist conspirations against the Second Spanish Republic enjoyed support from Mussolini. One of the most important Italian communities in Spain resided in Catalonia as well as the Italian economic interests in Spain lied there, hence that region became a significant point of attention for the Italian diplomacy during the Spanish Second Republic, and the Italian diplomacy established some contacts with incipient filo-fascist elements within Republican Left of Catalonia, including Josep Dencàs, although Italy eventually went on to bet on Spanish fascism. Although both monarchists from Renovación Española, the traditionalists and the Fascist falangists engaged in negotiations asking help from Fascist Italy regarding the preparations of the 1936 coup d'état, Mussolini decided not to take part at the time.

=== Italian intervention in the Spanish Civil War ===
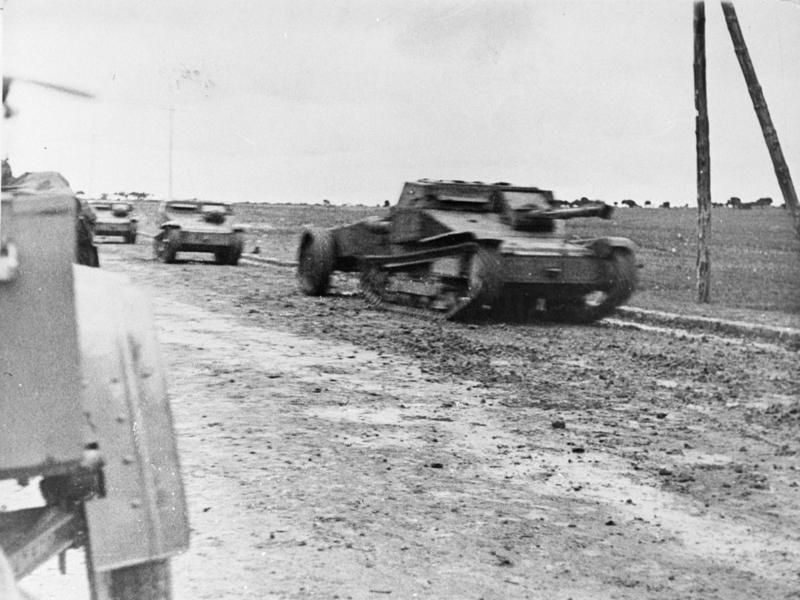
Italian tankettes advancing with a flame thrower tank during the battle of Guadalajara.

After 18 July 1936 and the beginning of the Spanish Civil War, Mussolini changed the strategy and intervened on the side of the Rebel faction. The Corps of Volunteer Troops (CTV), a fascist expeditionary force from Italy, brought in about 78,000 Italian troops, sent to help Franco and vowing to establish a Fascist Spain and a Fascist Europe. In 1937, key military actions in which the CTV took part included the battles of Málaga, Bermeo, Santander and the fiasco of Guadalajara. Between 1938 and 1939, according to the historian Rodrigo Javier, "the Italians were crucial to the success of the Rebel army...in breaking through and stabilizing the Aragon front, in the occupation of Barcelona and Girona and in concluding the Levantine campaign".

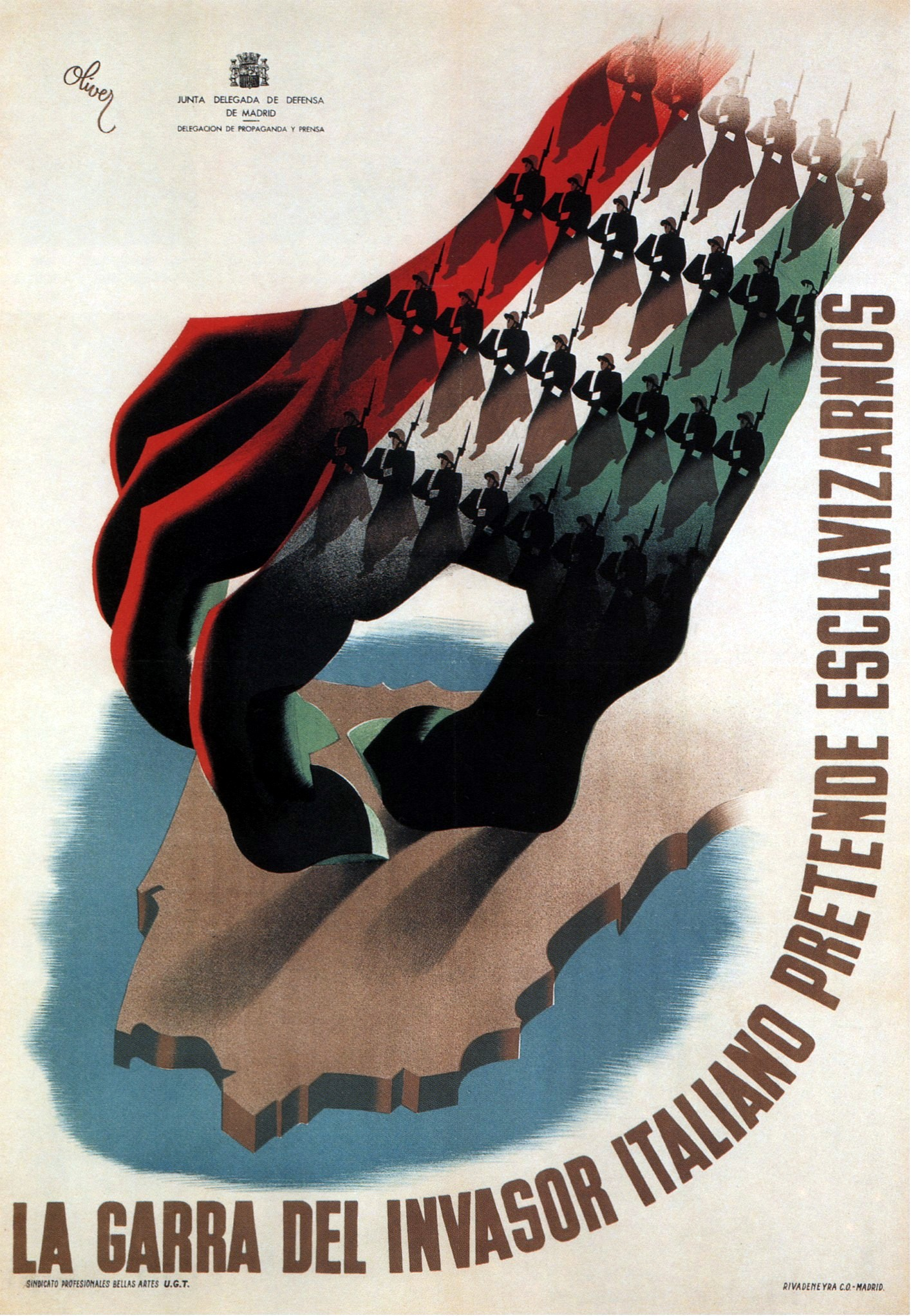
Spanish Republican poster decrying the Italian intervention in the Spanish Civil War: 'The Italian invader's claw wants to enslave us'.

Italian submarines carried out a campaign against Republican ships, also targeting Mediterranean ports together with surface ships. The Italian Regia Marina also provided key logistical support to the Rebels, including escort of commercial shipment transporting war supplies, and, seeking to facilitate the naval blockade on the Republic, it also allowed the Rebel Navy the use of anchorages in Sicily and Sardinia.

Italians forces in the Balearic Islands established an air base of the Aviazione Legionaria in Mallorca, from which Italians were given permission by the rebel authorities to bomb locations across the Peninsular Levante controlled by the Republic (including the bombings of Barcelona investigated as crimes against humanity). A Fascist squadristi, Arconovaldo Bonaccorsi, led a wild repression in the Balearic islands.

=== World War II ===
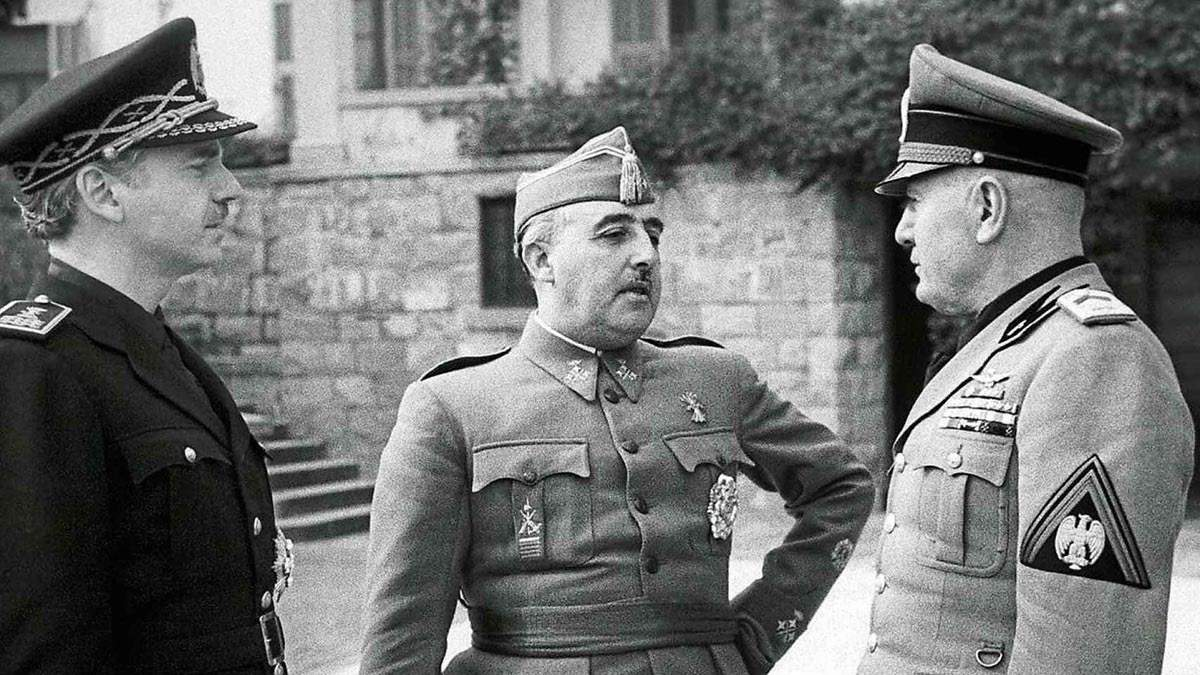
Italian leader Benito Mussolini, Spanish leader Francisco Franco and Spanish foreign minister Ramón Serrano Suñer (from right to left) in 1941

During World War II, 1939 to 1943, Spanish-Italian ties were close. Though Italy fought alongside Germany during the war, Spain was recovering from a civil war and remained neutral. In February 1941, the meeting between Mussolini and Franco in Bordighera took place; during the meeting the Duce asked Franco to join the Axis.

The fall of Mussolini came as a shock to the Franco administration. During the first few weeks the tightly-censored Spanish press limited themselves to laconic, matter-of-fact information when providing news on the Italian developments. However, after the Italian-American armistice had been made public, the Spanish papers extensively quoted the official German statement, which lambasted the Italian treason. Some Spanish officers sent their Italian military decorations back to the Italian embassy in Madrid.

Since mid-September 1943 two Italian states, the one headed by Mussolini and the one headed by king Victor Emmanuel III, competed for Spanish diplomatic recognition; the German diplomatic representatives in Madrid pressed the case of Mussolini, the Allied ones advised strongly against it. Following a period of hesitation, in late September Spain declared it would continue its official relations with the Kingdom of Italy.

The Italian ambassador in Madrid Paulucci di Calboli opted for the Badoglio government, even though some Italian consuls in Spain declared loyalty to Mussolini. The Spanish ambassador in Fascist Italy, Raimundo Fernández-Cuesta, formally remained at the post of the Spanish representative in the Kingdom, though he returned to Madrid; in practice before the Badoglio administration Spain was represented by lower-rank officials. However, Spain maintained informal relations with the Repubblica Sociale Italiana. The former Italian consul in Málaga, Eugenio Morreale, became an unofficial Mussolini representative in Madrid; the Spanish consul in Milan, Fernando Chantel, became an unofficial Franco representative in RSI.

In practice, Spain maintained distance towards both the so-called Kingdom of the South and the RSI. Badoglio sought Madrid's good offices to expedite negotiations with the Allies, but he was turned down. Major Fascist figures who sought Spanish passports were almost always denied assistance. During the final months of the war new ambassadors were appointed by both Spain (José Antonio de Sangróniz y Castro) and the Kingdom of Italy (Tommaso Gallarati Scotti), though Sangróniz arrived no earlier than in May 1945.

=== Cold War ===
After World War II, the Francoist dictatorship provided financial support to post-fascist Italian party Italian Social Movement (MSI), by means of a scheme set up by foreign minister Alberto Martín-Artajo. Starting in the 1960s, Franco also provided support to Ordine Nuovo and National Vanguard, also lending sanctuary to putschist Junio Valerio Borghese in 1970, with Spain henceforth serving as a den for some Italian far-right terrorists, who eventually played themselves a role in the so-called Spanish Transition.

=== 21st century ===
Nowadays, Italy and Spain are full member countries of the European Union (EU), NATO, and the Union for the Mediterranean (UfM). Bilateral relations between the two countries are very close due to the historical ties that unite them and due to their membership in the EU. Meetings between governments and at the business level are frequent. All of this is reflected in economic exchanges marked by a very significant weight.

Diplomatic relations under the EU have been mired by underlying issues of common mistrust between both countries; cultural proximity and common challenges notwithstanding. They underwent a period of "freezing cold" during the simultaneous premierships of Mariano Rajoy and Matteo Renzi, who did not get along on a personal level. Both governments outlined plans for the empowerment of a Madrid-Rome axis vis-à-vis EU negotiations of post COVID-19 reconstruction during the second cabinet of Italian prime minister Giuseppe Conte, with Pedro Sánchez as his Spanish counterpart. The arrival of Mario Draghi to Italian premiership, however, further distanced the position between both countries, contrasting to the hitherto "relative alignment" cultivated by Conte.

In November 2021, Italian President Sergio Mattarella made a state visit to Spain, and was received by King Felipe VI at the Royal Palace of Madrid.

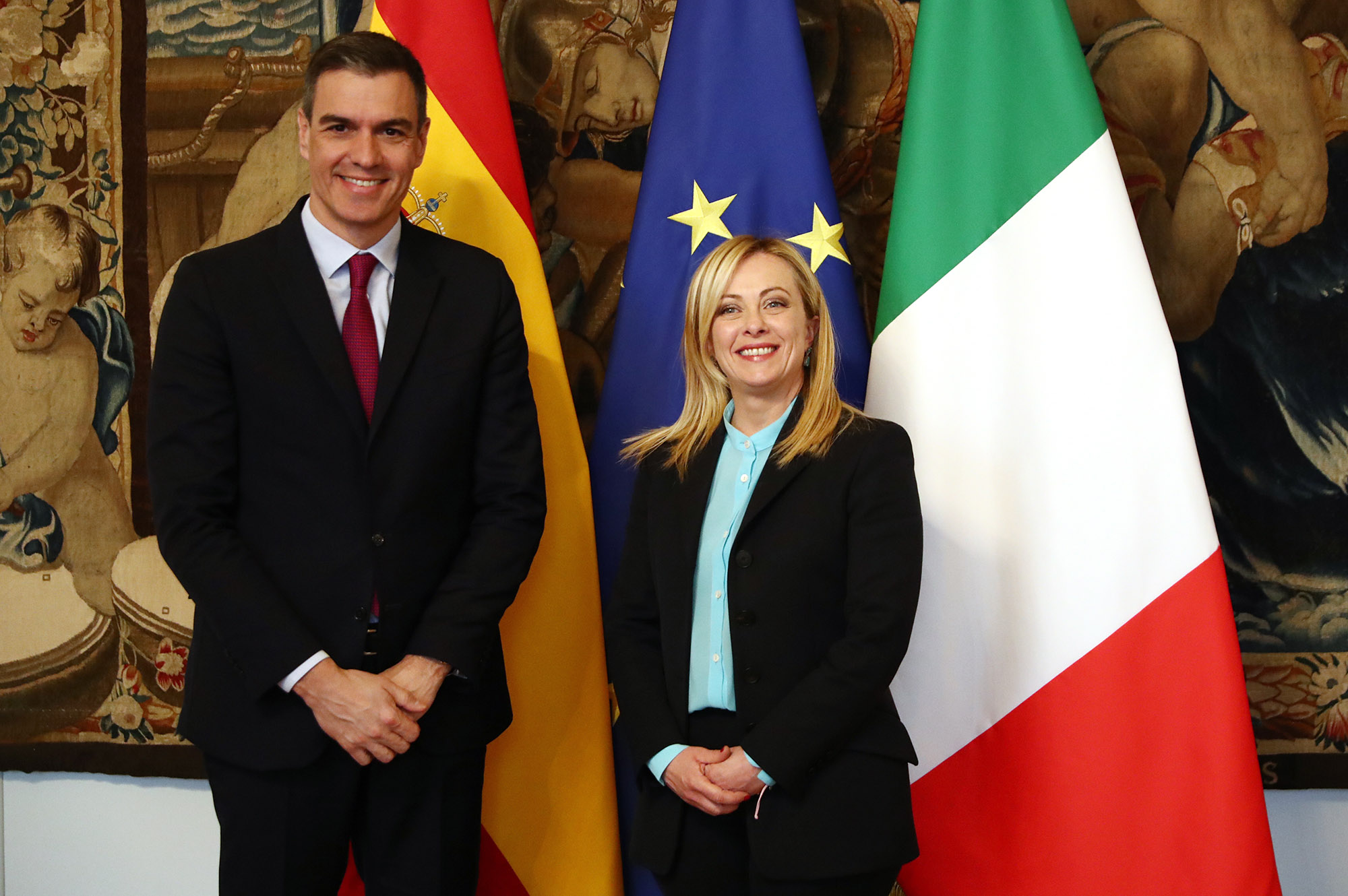
Italian Prime Minister Giorgia Meloni with Spanish Prime Minister Pedro Sánchez in Rome, 5 April 2023

In January 2022, Spain proposed to Italy the signing of a Friendship Treaty between the two countries. Spanish foreign minister Albares proposed to his Italian counterpart Di Maio the "relaunch" of the relationship between the parliaments of Spain and Italy and raised the prospect of creating an investment forum between companies from both countries pertaining to projects making use of EU funds. In November, the Italian Prime Minister, Giorgia Meloni, stated that cooperation on energy, "real economy" and immigration will continue, strengthening bilateral relations within the common framework of the EU and NATO.

Bilateral relations between Italy and Spain deteriorated significantly in July 2026, following the 2026 Morocco–Spain border incident when Italy temporarily suspended the Schengen free-travel agreement with Spain and reinstated targeted air and sea border controls. Prime Minister Giorgia Meloni called for Spain to be suspended from the Schengen Area, claiming that "uncontrolled illegal immigration poses a real threat to the security of Europe's borders" on X. In response, the Spanish government rejected statements by Italy and summoned Italy's ambassador to Madrid, with foreign Minister José Manuel Albares calling the Italian government's remarks inappropriate. The Government of Spain denounced the restrictions as discriminatory and imposed border controls on all air and sea travel from Italy, in the face of the "persistent irregular migratory pressure suffered by the Transalpine country".

== Cultural exchange ==
During the Age of Discovery, famous Italian explorers and travelers were part of modern Spanish history. Examples include Amerigo Vespucci, Christopher Columbus and Francesco Guicciardini.

== Diaspora ==
A Eurostat publication in 2016 estimated that 187,847 Italian citizens live in Spain and 19,094 Spanish citizens live in Italy.

== Resident diplomatic missions ==
- Italy has an embassy in Madrid and a consulate-general in Barcelona.
- Spain has an embassy in Rome and consulate-generals in Milan and Naples.
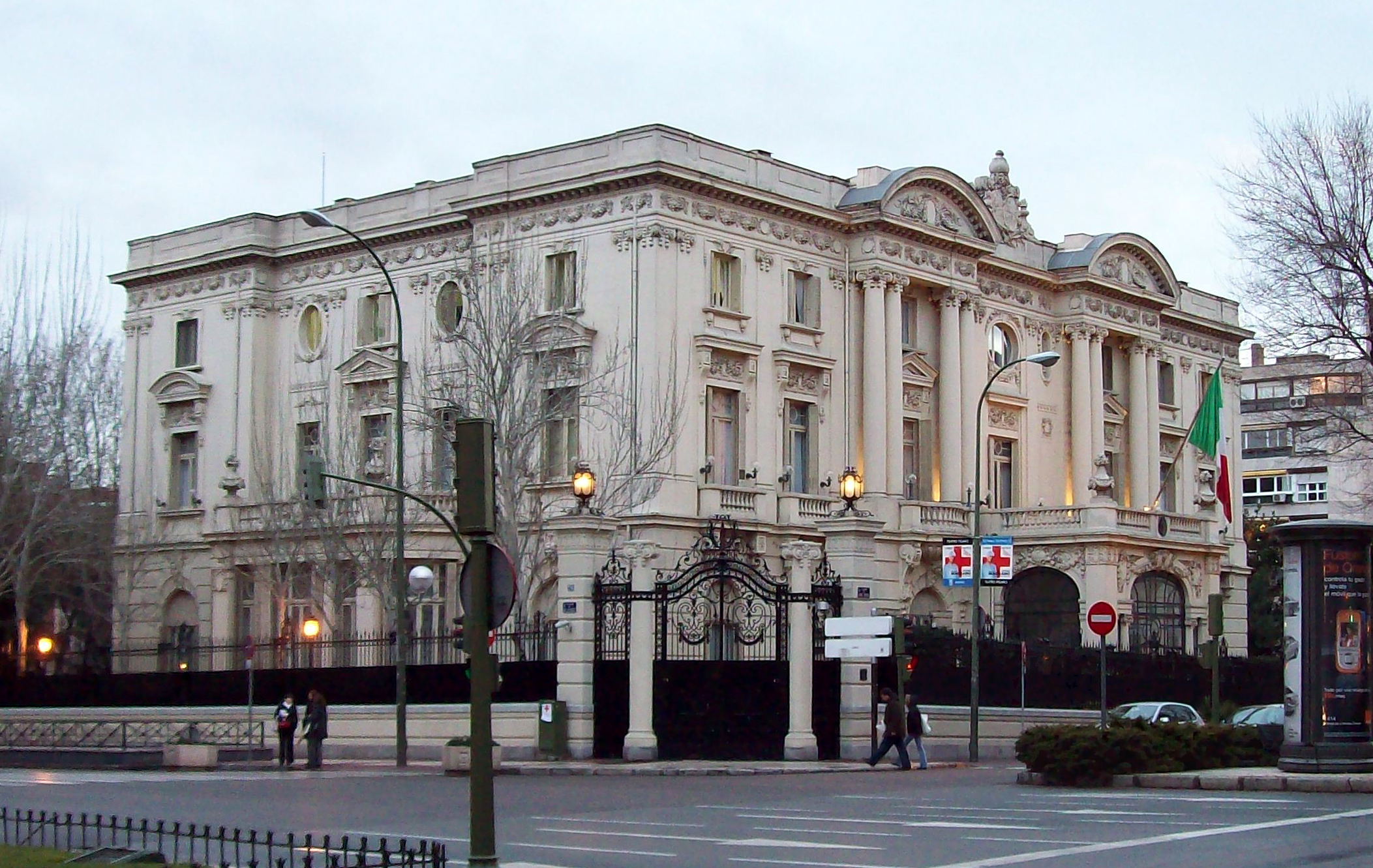
Embassy of Italy in Madrid

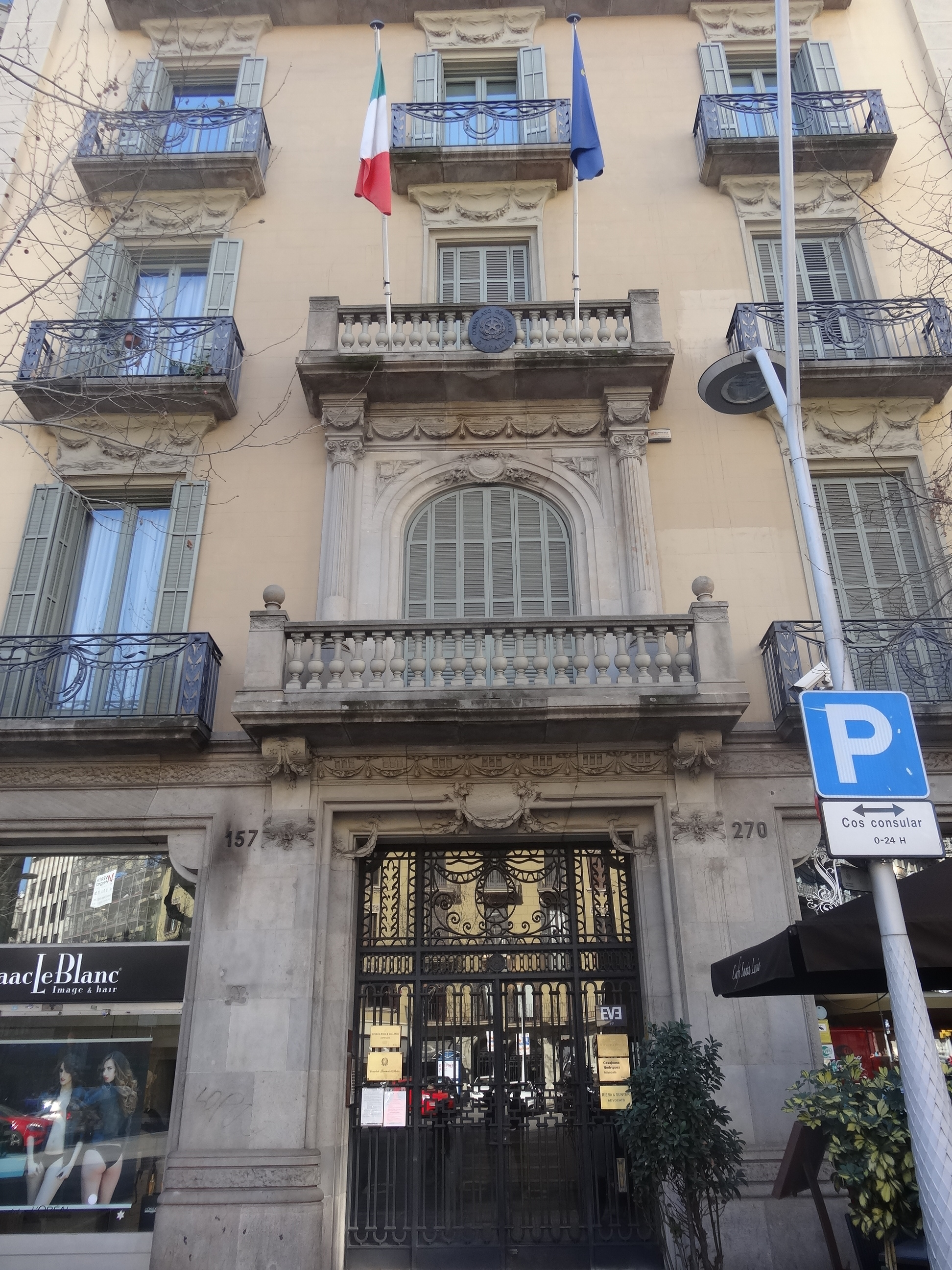
Consulate-General of Italy in Barcelona

Embassy of Spain in Rome

Building hosting the Consulate-General of Spain in Milan

== See also ==
- Spanish–Italian Amphibious Battlegroup

== Bibliography ==
- Aguilera Povedano, Manuel (2019). "Italia en la Guerra Civil Española: el capitán Villegas y el origen de la Aviación Legionaria de Baleares". Cuadernos de Historia Contemporánea. 41. Madrid: Ediciones Complutense: 285–304. doi:10.5209/chco.66105. ISSN 0214-400X.
- Albanese, Matteo, and Pablo Del Hierro. Transnational fascism in the twentieth century: Spain, Italy and the global neo-fascist network (Bloomsbury Publishing, 2016).
- Campo Rizo, José Manuel (1997). "El Mediterráneo, campo de batalla de la Guerra Civil española: la intervención naval italiana. Una primera aproximación documental". Cuadernos de Historia Contemporánea. 19. Madrid: Ediciones Complutense: 55–87. ISSN 0214-400X.
- Dandelet, Thomas, and John Marino, eds. Spain in Italy: Politics, Society, and Religion 1500-1700 (Brill, 2006).
- Domínguez Méndez, Rubén (2013). "Francia en el horizonte. La política de aproximación italiana a la España de Primo de Rivera a través del campo cultural". Memoria y Civilización (16). Pamplona: University of Navarre: 237–265. doi:10.15581/001.16.75. S2CID 252952903.
- González i Vilalta, Arnau (2009). Cataluña bajo vigilancia: El consulado italiano y el fascio de Barcelona (1930-1943). Valencia: Publicacions de la Universitat de València. ISBN 978-84-370-8309-4.
- Hierro Lecea, Pablo del (2015). Spanish-Italian Relations and the Influence of the Major Powers, 1943-1957. Security, Conflict and Cooperation in the Contemporary World. Palgrave Macmillan. ISBN 978-1-349-49654-9.
- López Vega, Antonio; Martínez Neira, Manuel (2011). "España y la(s) cuestión(es) de Italia" (PDF). Giornale di Storia Costituzionale (22): 96.
- Payne, Stanley G. (1998). "Fascist Italy and Spain, 1922–45" (PDF). Mediterranean Historical Review. 13 (1–2): 99–115. doi:10.1080/09518969808569738. ISSN 0951-8967.
- Rodrigo, Javier (2019). "A fascist warfare? Italian fascism and war experience in the Spanish Civil War (1936–39)". War in History. 26 (1): 86–104. doi:10.1177/0968344517696526. S2CID 159711547.
- Saz-Campos, Ismael (1981). "De la conspiración al alzamiento. Mussolini y el alzamiento nacional" (PDF). Cuadernos de trabajos de la Escuela Española de Historia y Arqueología en Roma: 321–358. ISSN 0392-0801.
- Sueiro Seoane, Susana (1987). "La política mediterránea de Primo de Rivera: el triángulo Hispano-ltalo-Francés" (PDF). Revista de la Facultad de Geografía e Historia (1). Madrid: Universidad Nacional de Educación a Distancia: 183–223.
- Tusell, Javier; Saz, Ismael (1982). "Mussolini y Primo de Rivera: las relaciones políticas y económicas de dos dictaturas mediterráneas". Boletín de la Real Academia de la Historia. CLXXIX (III). Madrid: Real Academia de la Historia: 413–484.
