= Antonio de Castro y Casaléiz =

Spanish politician and diplomat

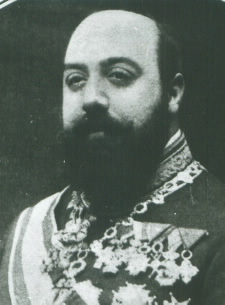

Antonio de Castro y Casaleiz (Havana, 1856 - Vienna, 1918) was a Spanish politician and diplomat who served, in 1898, as Consul-General of Spain in Cairo. He also acted briefly as Spanish Foreign Minister in 1903 and 1905.

In 1905 he was appointed Spanish ambassador to Italy, a post he held for only a few months before returning to political activity. On 20 March 1914, he presented his credentials in Vienna as Spanish representative to the Austro-Hungarian court. His work was hampered by the course of the First World War, and he died in the Austrian capital on 3 October 1918 of the Spanish flu.
