= Lists of political office-holders in Italy =

These are lists of political office-holders in Italy.

== Heads of state ==
- King of Italy
- Presidents of the Italian Republic

== Heads of government ==
- Prime ministers of Italy

== Ministers ==
- Minister of the Interior (Italy)
- Minister of Foreign Affairs (Italy)
- Minister of Defence (Italy)
- Minister of Justice (Italy)
- Minister of Public Education (Italy)

== Heads of former states ==
=== Princely states ===
- Rulers of Tuscany
- Rulers of Milan
- Counts and kings of Sicily
- Kings of Naples
- Dukes of Savoy, kings of Sardinia, and kings of Italy from 1861
- Doges of Venice
- Dukes of Parma
- Dukes of Modena
- Dukes of Amalfi
- Counts and dukes of Apulia and Calabria
- Chancellor of Florence
- Counts of Aversa
- Dukes and princes of Benevento
- Gastalds and princes of Capua
- Dukes of Ferrara and of Modena
- Dukes of Friuli
- Hypati and dukes of Gaeta
- Doge of Genoa
- Marquises and dukes of Mantua
- Lords and dukes of Milan
- Marquises of Montferrat
- Lords and princes of Piedmont
- Princes of Salerno
- Marquises of Saluzzo
- Dukes of Spoleto
- Princes of Taranto
- Counts of Tusculum
- Doges of Venice

=== Rome ===
- Roman emperors
- Roman usurpers
- Roman kings
- List of Roman consuls
- Censors
- Roman dictators
- Prefects of the Praetorian Guard
- Tyrants of Syracuse, see Syracuse, Italy
