= Wenceslao Ramírez de Villa-Urrutia, 1st Marquis of Villa-Urrutia =

Spanish politician

The Most Excellent Wenceslao Ramírez de Villa-Urrutia 1st Marquis of Villa-Urrutia
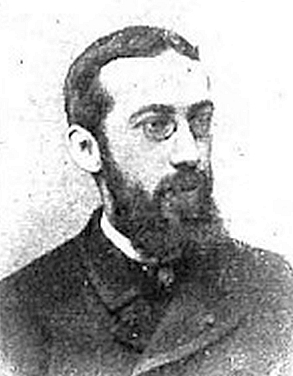

Minister of State
- In office 27 January 1905 – 23 June 1905
- Preceded by: The Marquis of Aguilar de Campoo
- Succeeded by: Felipe Sánchez Román

Seat f of the Real Academia Española
- In office 4 June 1916 – 10 April 1933
- Preceded by: Luis Coloma
- Succeeded by: Miguel Artigas

Personal details
- Born: 17 February 1850 Havana, Cuba, Spain
- Died: 10 April 1933 (aged 83) Madrid, Spain
- Party: Republican
- Spouses: Maria Luisa Ramirez; Ana Maria Camacho y Diaz-Duran
- Children: Fernando Ramírez de Villa-Urrutia, 2nd Marquis of Villa-Urrutia
- Profession: Politician, Diplomat, Historian Royal Academy of History

Wenceslao Ramírez de Villa-Urrutia, 1st Marquis of Villa-Urrutia (1850, in Havana – 1933, in Madrid) was a Spanish noble, politician and diplomat who served as Minister of State between 27 January and 23 June 1905, in a cabinet headed by Raimundo Fernández Villaverde during the reign of Alfonso XIII.

== Career ==
Ramírez was appointed a senator for life in 1905. He served as Ambassador of Spain to the United Kingdom (1906-1912), France (1912-1914) and Italy (1916-1923). He also served as a plenipotentiary minister to Constantinople, Athens, and Brussels. He was awarded the crosses of the Order of Isabella the Catholic and the Order of Charles III for his service to Spain, and the Cross of Naval Merit for his military service.

Ramírez was a member of the Royal Academy of History and the Royal Spanish Academy.

== Published works ==
He authored multiple historical books, including

- La conferencia de AIgeciras (The Conference of Algeciras) (1906),
- Relaciones de España e Inglaterra durante la Guerra de la Independencia (Spanish and English Relations during the War of Independence) (1911), *Apuntes para la historia diplomática de España (Notes for the Diplomatic History of Spain) (1914),
- Las mujeres de Fernando VII (Women of Fernando VII) (1916),
- La reina María Luisa, esposa de Carlos IV (Queen Maria Luisa, wife of Carlos IV) (1927),
- Palique diplomático (1928), Madame de Staël (1930),
- Fernán-Núñez, el embajador (Fernán-Núñez, the ambassador) (1931);
- Fernando VII, rey constitucional, y Fernando VII, rey absoluto (Fernando VII, constitutional king, and Ferdinand VII, absolute king) (1931),
- Lucrecia Borja, Le Reina Gobernadora (Lucrezia Borgia, the Ruling Queen).

Political offices
Preceded by The Marquis of Aguilar de Campoo	Minister of State; 27 January 1905 – 23 June 1905	Succeeded by Felipe Sánchez Román
