= José Joaquín Puig de la Bellacasa =

Spanish diplomat and civil servant (1931–2021)

Secretary-General of the Royal Household
- In office 19 January 1990 – 27 February 1991
- Monarch: Juan Carlos I
- Preceded by: The Count of Latores
- Succeeded by: Joel Casino Gimeno

Member of the Spanish Council of State
- In office 1997–2005

Personal details
- Born: José Joaquín Puig de la Bellacasa y Urdampilleta; 5 June 1931 Bilbao, Spain
- Died: 20 April 2021 (aged 89) Madrid, Spain
- Education: Complutense University of Madrid

José Joaquín Puig de la Bellacasa y Urdampilleta (5 June 1931 – 20 April 2021) was a Spanish diplomat and civil servant.

== Early life and education ==
Bellacasa attended the Complutense University of Madrid.

== Career ==
He served as the Under-Secretary of Foreign Affairs from 1978 to 1980. Between 1980 and 1983, he was the Ambassador of Spain to the Holy See and the Sovereign Military Order of Malta, from 1983 and 1990 to the United Kingdom and from 1991 to 1995 to Portugal.

He was named Secretary-General of the Spanish Royal Household, office he held until 1991.

== Death ==
He died from COVID-19 on 20 April 2021, at the age of 89.
