= Mauricio López-Roberts =

Spanish noble, diplomat and politician

Don Mauricio López-Roberts y Terry, Marquess consort of Torrehermosa (Nice, France, 23 January 1873 - Madrid, Spain, 18 February 1940) was a Spanish noble, diplomat and politician.

== Works ==
=== Narrative ===
- The Triz Garcia, 1902.
- The singer, 1902.
- The family of Hita, 1902.
- The future of Paco Tudela, 1903.
- Arnaiz Lino's novel, 1905.
- The Sphinx smiles, 1906.
- The wagon of Thespis, 1906.
- "Las infanzonas", 1907.
- A Night of Souls, 1907.
- Doña Martyrdom, 1907.
- The true home, 1917, Fastenrath Award.
- Old wives tales, 1917.
- The jealous, 1918.
- The white bird, 1919.
- The groom, 1920.

=== Essay ===
- Poster Art, 1931.
