= Gabriel Alomar Villalonga =

Spanish poet, essayist, educator and diplomat

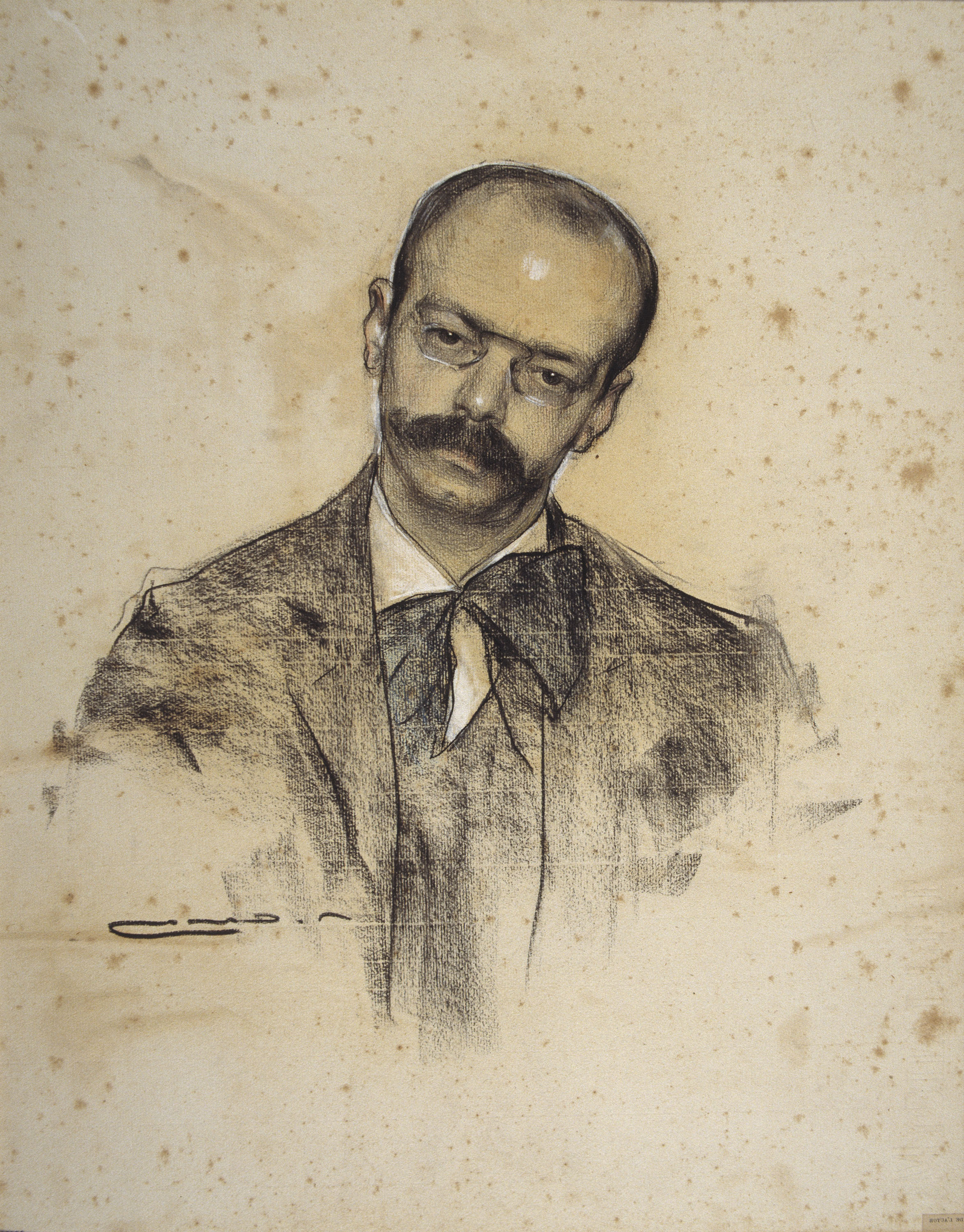
Gabriel Alomar, drawn by Ramon Casas (MNAC)

Gabriel Alomar i Villalonga (Catalan pronunciation: [ɡəβɾiˈɛl əluˈmaɾ]; 7 October 1873 – 7 August 1941) was a Spanish poet, essayist, educator and diplomat. He was closely related to the Catalan art movement Modernisme. He was an active leftist libertarian, chiefly in Barcelona and the other Catalan-speaking regions, from the first years of the 20th century until his death from pneumonia in exile.

== Beginnings ==
Alomar was born in Palma de Mallorca and raised in the Balearic Islands, a traditional province of Spain where the power of the Catholic Church was very strong. His father was a minor bureaucrat and so was moved around rather often; this made Gabriel's childhood rather more cosmopolitan than was normal for Spanish youngsters of the time. In 1888, after finishing secondary school in Palma de Mallorca, he (like many young Mallorcan men) went to mainland Barcelona to finish his education. In this environment, he became active as a journalist as well as continuing to publish poetry in what the critic Josephine de Boer has called a Parnassian mode, as well as becoming involved with the Catalan regionalist movement and the literary trend of noucentisme.

== Poetry ==
Gabriel Alomar is often placed by critics among the poets of the Escola Mallorquina, but this choice is problematic. Alomar's poetry is technically rather conservative in form, but in terms of content it does not fit well with the highly orthodox Catholic beliefs of the other poets associated with the school (Joan Alcover, Miquel Costa i Llobera). A better-fitting classification is to group his poetry with the Parnassianist strain of Modernista poetry. While Alomar's verse was and is well regarded in his home territory of Mallorca, it is his essays and journalism which continue to be reprinted and read.

== Journalism ==
Alomar's periodical writings tended less toward strict reportage and more toward a polemic style couched in column form. His columns often read like speeches; in fact, as an educator and secondary school director, many of them began as lectures. The most famous of these speech-articles, El futurisme, describes Alomar's vision of Spain's present condition, its problems, and his ideas for solving them. He is credited of inventing the term futurism, as well as partly its ideology, not the Italian poet Filippo Tommaso Marinetti, this discovery being outlined by authors with the stature of Nicaraguan modernist poet Rubén Darío and Chilean avant-garde poet Vicente Huidobro. In essence, Alomar believed that Spain was addicted to its own past, that it preferred to maintain a belief in the regeneration of Iberia's imperial past rather than turn about and face the twentieth century. For Alomar, the future was far more important than the past, and so this addiction was Spain's main problem. Thus the name.

== Diplomat ==
Gabriel Alomar was the Spanish Ambassador to Italy (1932–1934) and Egypt from 1937 to the end of the Spanish Civil War but remained in Egypt until his death in Cairo in 1941.

== Influence ==
Gabriel Alomar had many occupations in his life, but throughout it he was constantly in demand as a writer of prologues. He wrote dozens, in Castilian Spanish, Catalan, and French, for editions of famous writers and for young authors needing a boost.

== See also ==
- L'Esquella de la Torratxa
