= Luis López de la Torre Ayllón y Kirsmacker =

Spanish nobleman, politician and diplomat

Don Luis López de la Torre Ayllón

Don Luis López de la Torre Ayllón y Kirsmacker (29 March 1799 in Hamburg, Holy Roman Empire – 2 December 1875 in Madrid, Spain) was a Spanish nobleman, politician and diplomat who served as Minister of State in 1853.

He was also Spanish Ambassador in Switzerland (1843), Portugal (1856-57), and Austria (1851-56 and 1858-68).

Political offices
Preceded by The Count of Alcoy	Minister of State; 14 April 1853 – 21 June 1853	Succeeded by Ángel Calderón de la Barca
