= Madras (cloth) =

Fine handwoven cotton fabric of India

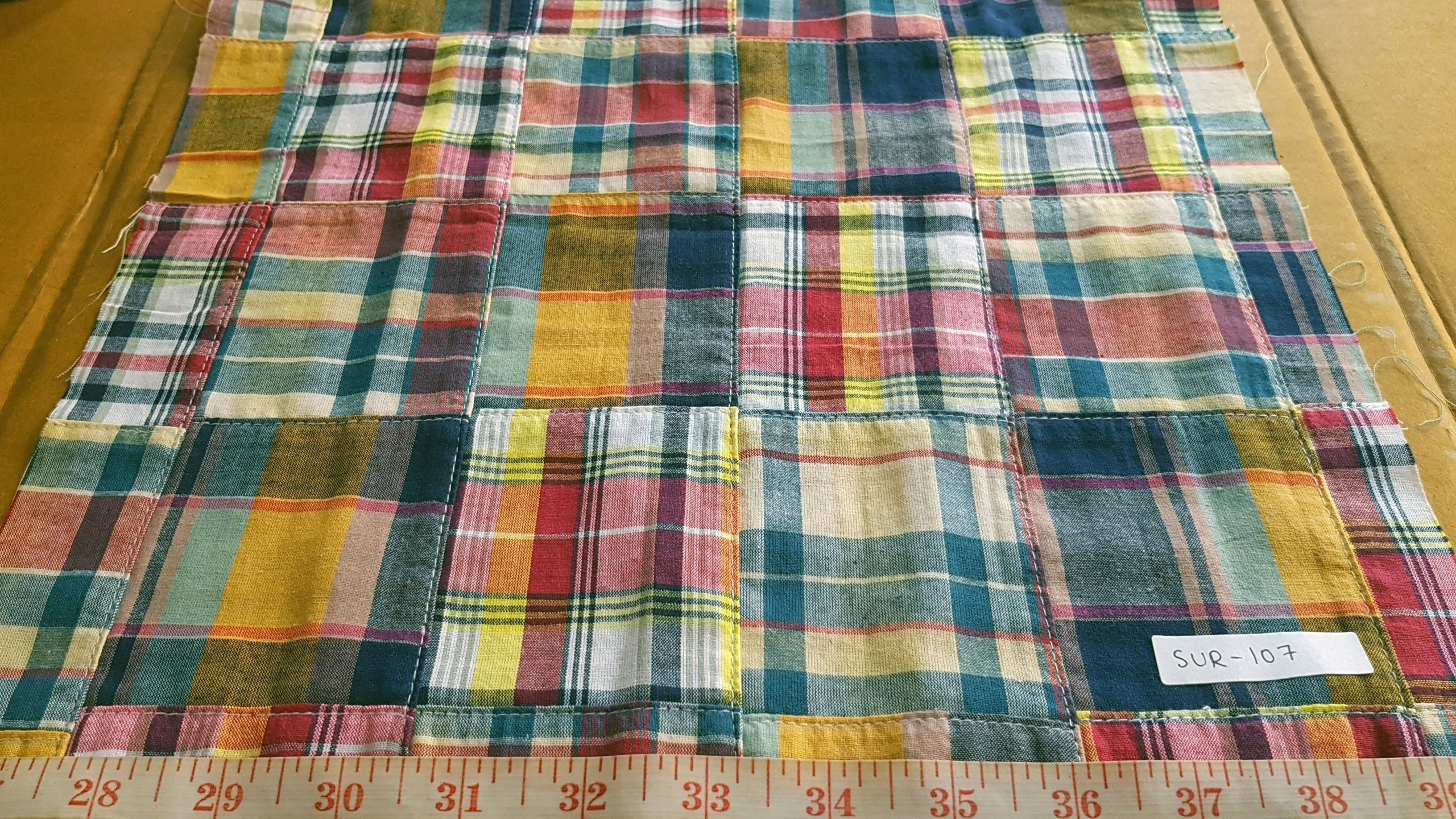
Samples of cloth showing many typical Madras patterns

Madras is a lightweight cotton fabric with typically patterned texture and tartan design, used primarily for summer clothing such as pants, shorts, lungi, dresses, and jackets. The fabric takes its name from the former name of the city of Chennai in India.

== Definition ==
Authentic Madras comes from Chennai (Madras) in Tamil Nadu. Both sides of the cloth must bear the same pattern, and it must be handwoven (evidenced by the small flaws in the fabric). Madras was most popular in the 1960s.

Cotton madras is woven from a fragile, short-staple cotton fiber that cannot be combed, only carded. This results in bumps known as slubs which are thick spots in the yarn that give madras its unique texture. The cotton is hand-dyed after being spun into yarn, woven, and finished in some 200 small villages in the Madras area.

== History ==
By the 16th century, madras cotton had morphed into something more elegant, printed with floral patterns or religious designs.

Dutch traders arrived in India in the early 17th century to trade in the local calico cloth, followed by the British. The English East India Company sought quality textiles, finding the small fishing village of Madrasapattinam (Madras), and the company established a trading post there in the mid-17th century.

The first madras material was a muslin overprinted or embroidered in elaborate patterns with vegetable dyes. To secure a reliable labor supply, the English East India Company promised a 30-year exemption from duties for Indian weavers in the area, and thus within a year nearly 400 families of weavers had settled in Madras.

Undyed madras cloth became popular in Europe because it was lightweight and breathable. Cotton plaid madras reached America in 1718 as a donation to the Collegiate School of Connecticut (now known as Yale University). Sears offered the first madras shirt for sale to the American consumer in its 1897 catalog.

In the Philippines, madras fabric was known as cambaya, after the state of Cambay (present-day Gujarat, India) that also exported madras fabrics. They were popular in the early 19th century for use in traditional women's skirts (saya) in the baro't saya ensemble, as well as for pants for the barong tagalog. Since they were expensive, they were copied by Chinese manufacturers as well as local industries, resulting in a lower-grade fabric that was usually used for clothing by commoners.

The name "madras" was attributed to shirt maker David J. Anderson in 1844, although the material had been referred to as such much earlier. In 1958 William Jacobson, a leading textile importer, traveled to Bombay to trade with Captain C.P. Krishnan, an exporter of madras from Chennai (formerly Madras). The two men struck a dollar-a-yard deal for madras material possessing a "strong smell of vegetable dyes and sesame oils," woven of bright colors and originally bound for South Africa. Krishnan warned Jacobson that the fabric should be washed gently in cold water to avoid bleeding, advice that never reached the Brooks Brothers buyers to whom Jacobson sold 10,000 yards for the manufacture of madras clothing. Brooks Brothers then sold cotton madras garments to consumers without proper washing instructions, resulting in the bright madras dyes bleeding in the wash and the garments emerged discolored and faded. To counter dissatisfied customers, Madison Avenue advertising giant David Ogilvy coined the phrase "guaranteed to bleed" and used this as a selling point rather than a defect. A 1966 advertisement in John Plain stated:

Authentic Indian Madras is completely handwoven from yarns dyed with native vegetable colorings. Home-spun by native weavers, no two plaids are exactly the same. When washed with mild soap in warm water, they are guaranteed to bleed and blend together into distinctively muted and subdued colorings.

In the United States, the plaid cotton madras shirt became popular in the 1960s among the post-World War II generation of preppy baby boomers.

As early as the 1930s, cotton madras clothing was emerging as a status symbol in the US because only American tourists who could afford expensive Caribbean vacations during the Great Depression had access and thus the madras shirt was a signal of affluence.

Madras today is available as plaid patterns in regular cotton, seersucker, and as patchwork madras, meaning cutting several madras fabrics into squares or rectangles and sewing them back together to form a mixed pattern of various plaids.

== National costumes ==
In 1994 the government of Antigua and Barbuda adopted a new national dress, which featured madras cloth, that had been designed by artist Heather Doram, as a result of a national competition.

== Gallery ==
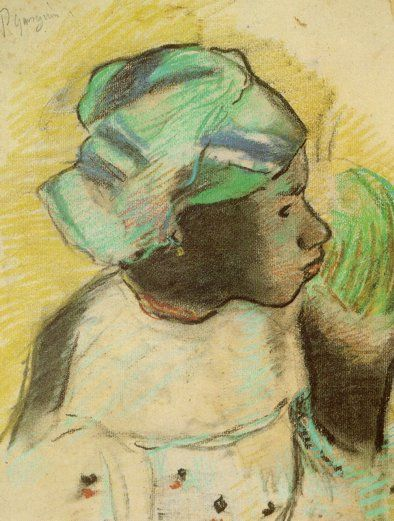
A young Martinican woman in Madras. By Paul Gauguin, 1887.

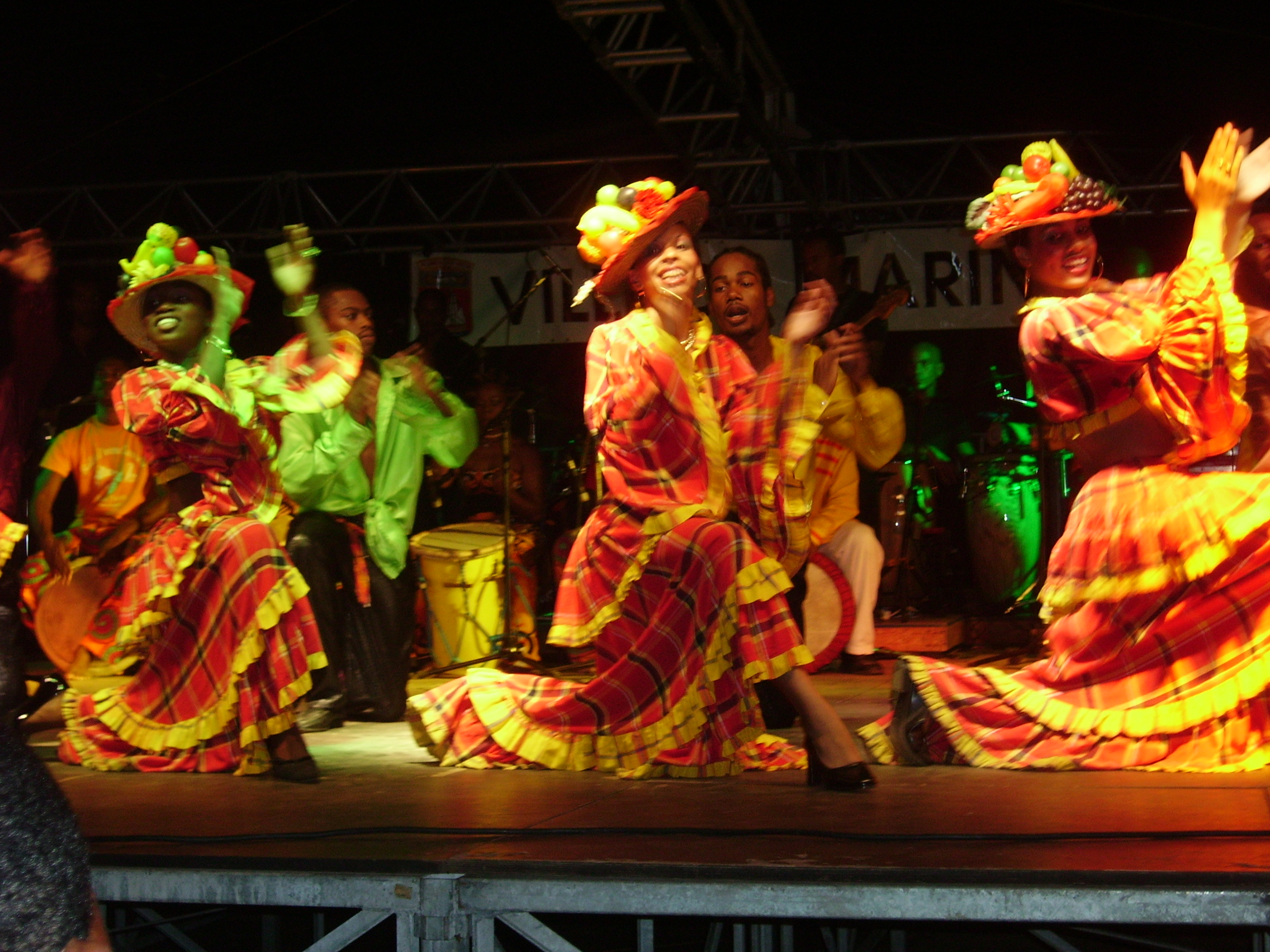
Martinican carnival costumes using madras fabrics.

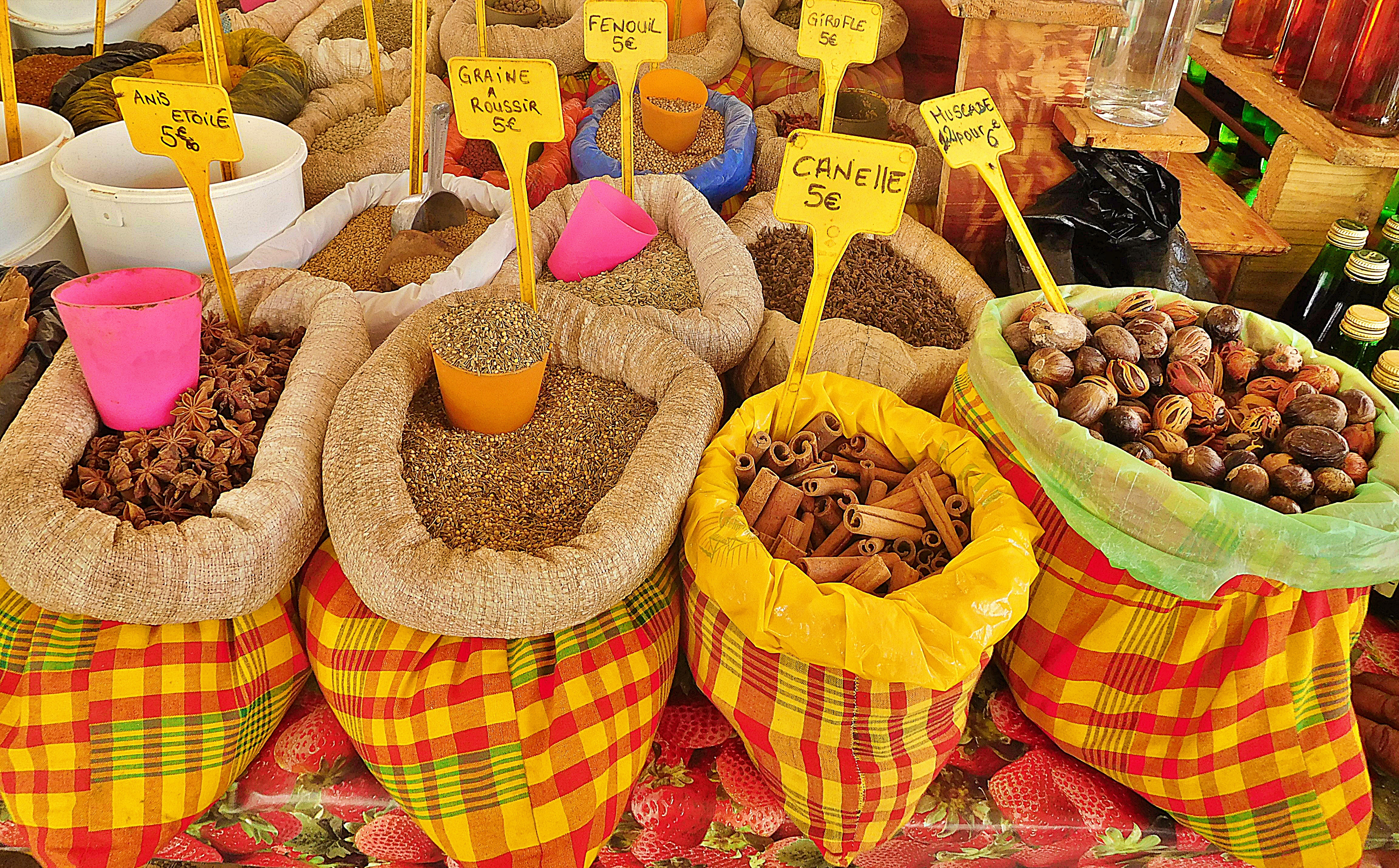
Madras bags of spices in a Saint-Antoine market in Guadeloupe.

== See also ==
- Check (fabric)
- Gingham
- Flannel
- Ivy League fashion
- Tartan
- Tattersall (cloth)
