= Check (pattern) =

Pattern of intersecting vertical and horizontal stripes

Check (also checker, Brit: chequer, dicing, or checkerboard and checkerboard pattern) is a pattern of modified stripes consisting of crossed horizontal and vertical lines which form squares. The pattern typically contains two colours where a single checker (that is a single square within the check pattern) is surrounded on all four sides by a checker of a different colour.

The pattern is commonly placed onto garments and is, in certain social contexts, applied to clothing which is worn to signify cultural or political affiliations. Such is the case with check in ska and on the keffiyeh. The pattern's all-pervasiveness and simple layout has lent to its practical usage in scientific experimentation and observation, optometry, technology (hardware and software), and as a symbol for responders to associate meaning with.

== Etymology ==
The word is derived from the ancient Persian word shah which means 'king' in the Sasanian game of shatranj; an old form of chess which is played on a squared board of alternating coloured checkers. It is more specifically derived from the expression shah mat, 'the king is dead', with check-mate the equivalent modern chess term. The word entered the French language as echec in the eleventh century, thence into English.

== History ==
The incorporation of the checkerboard pattern in human-made objects has no definitive origin as the pattern has existed in assorted forms with multiple variations across continents and time periods. There are few known instances of its import into the regions and cultures in which it is featured. Its design and incorporation by humans into pattern-making and weaving precedes its common etymological characterisation and derivation from the word shah in chess; the language conventions from which the contemporary English word 'check' is extracted are younger than some appearances of the pattern or its variations. Human uses for check predate its notable usage on the checkerboard in the board game chess, which was developed in its chaturanga iteration in the late 6th or early 7th century AD. This is illustrated by the comparative age of weaving which creates a checkered pattern as a byproduct of its process, as weaving is estimated to have originated in the Neolithic period or approximately 10000 BC. Weavers have long produced checked patterns, but fashion trends and its level of ubiquitousness vary over time. Check's variant tartan appears on the 3000-year-old mummy the Cherchen Man. The checkerboard pattern has also been identified in Bronze Age pottery and ancient Roman architecture.

Check may not have a single foundation specific to a practice, region or type of material because it appears within nature and thus can be imitated and adapted. The checkered garter snake, chequered skipper and cleridae, commonly known as checkered beetles exemplify natural occurrences of the pattern which have emerged without human interference or stimuli.

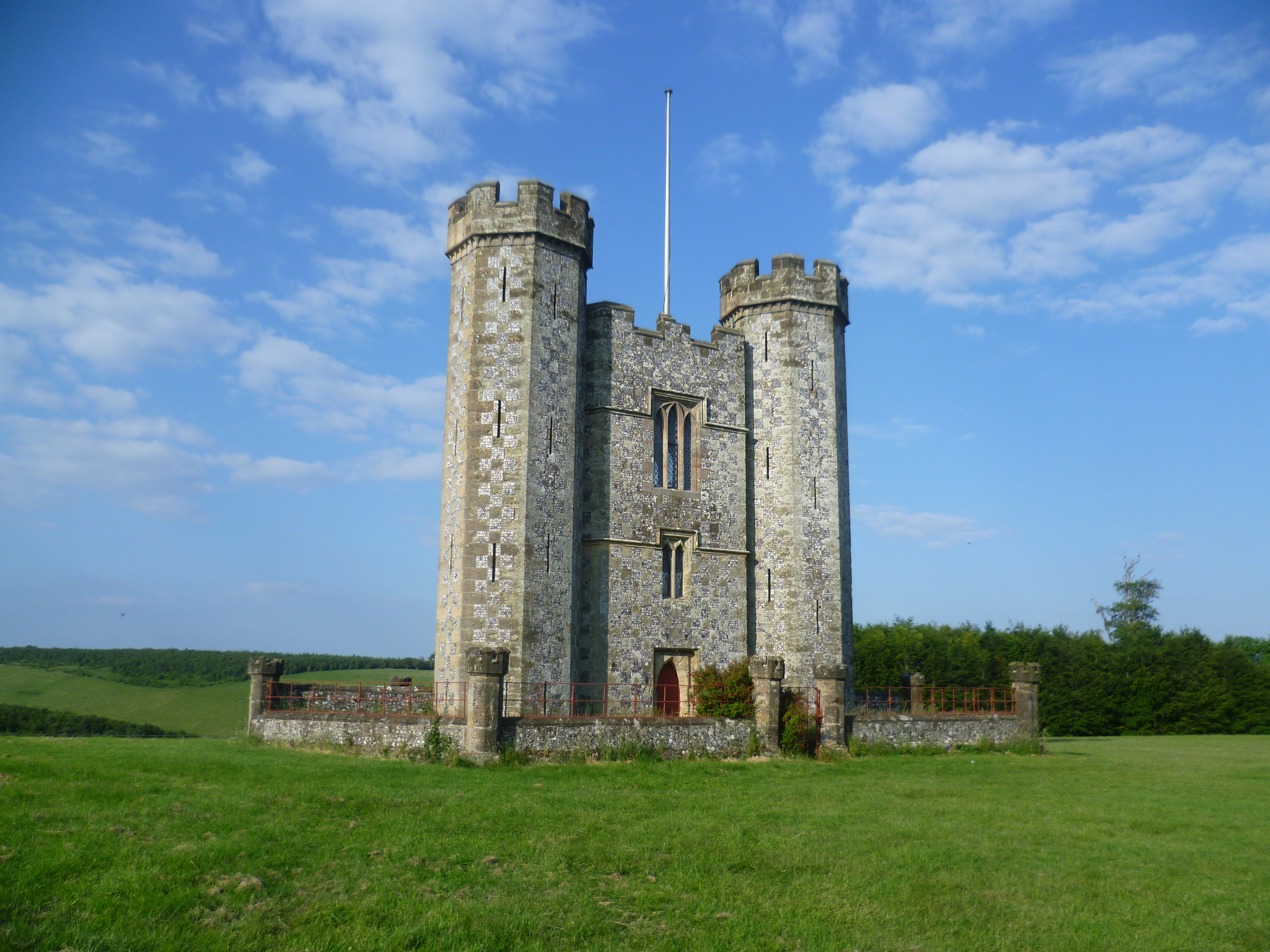
Checkered exterior of Hiorn Tower

Check appears in architecture as checkerwork (also chequer-work or diapering): a laying of bricks or tiles of two different materials or colours in an arrangement that, when finished, resembles the checkered pattern. This design was popularly used across England and in nearby regions in parish churches and small houses following the 16th-century Reformation. Notable instances of its usage in England includes its appearance on the exterior of Hiorne Tower and above the windows in Westminster Hall.

=== Scotland ===
The pattern, in its tartan variation, is prominent in Scottish garment designs and gained notoriety from the 16th century onwards among Scottish Highlanders. The design was introduced by the Celts before it became a staple of highland dress. Following the battle of Culloden, wearing check or tartan was banned through the Dress Act 1746 in an attempt to control Scottish clans who supported the Jacobite rising of 1745. In the 1930s the checkerboard pattern was incorporated into the design of Scotland's police uniform which was later nicknamed Sillitoe tartan and adopted as a police symbol globally.

=== South India ===
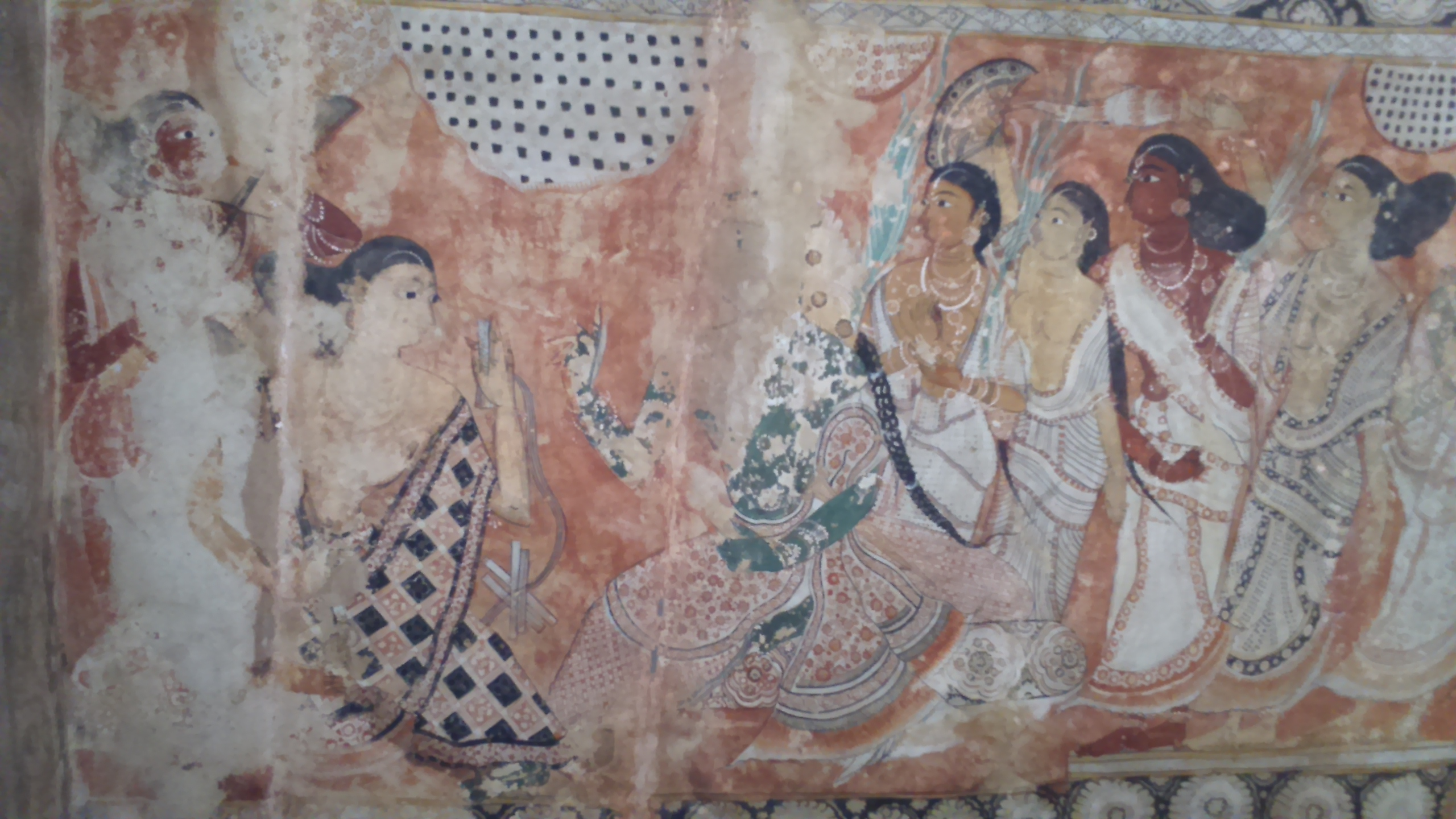
Mural in Veerabhadra temple

Checkered stripes were prominent in textile designs around the Coromandel Coast in the 16th–17th century. According to 17th century trade records, the use of the check pattern in ornamentation became widespread across South India. Numerous paintings in the Veerabhadra temple display figures who dress in checkered cotton and show the prominence of the check pattern in traditional dress.

== Fashion ==
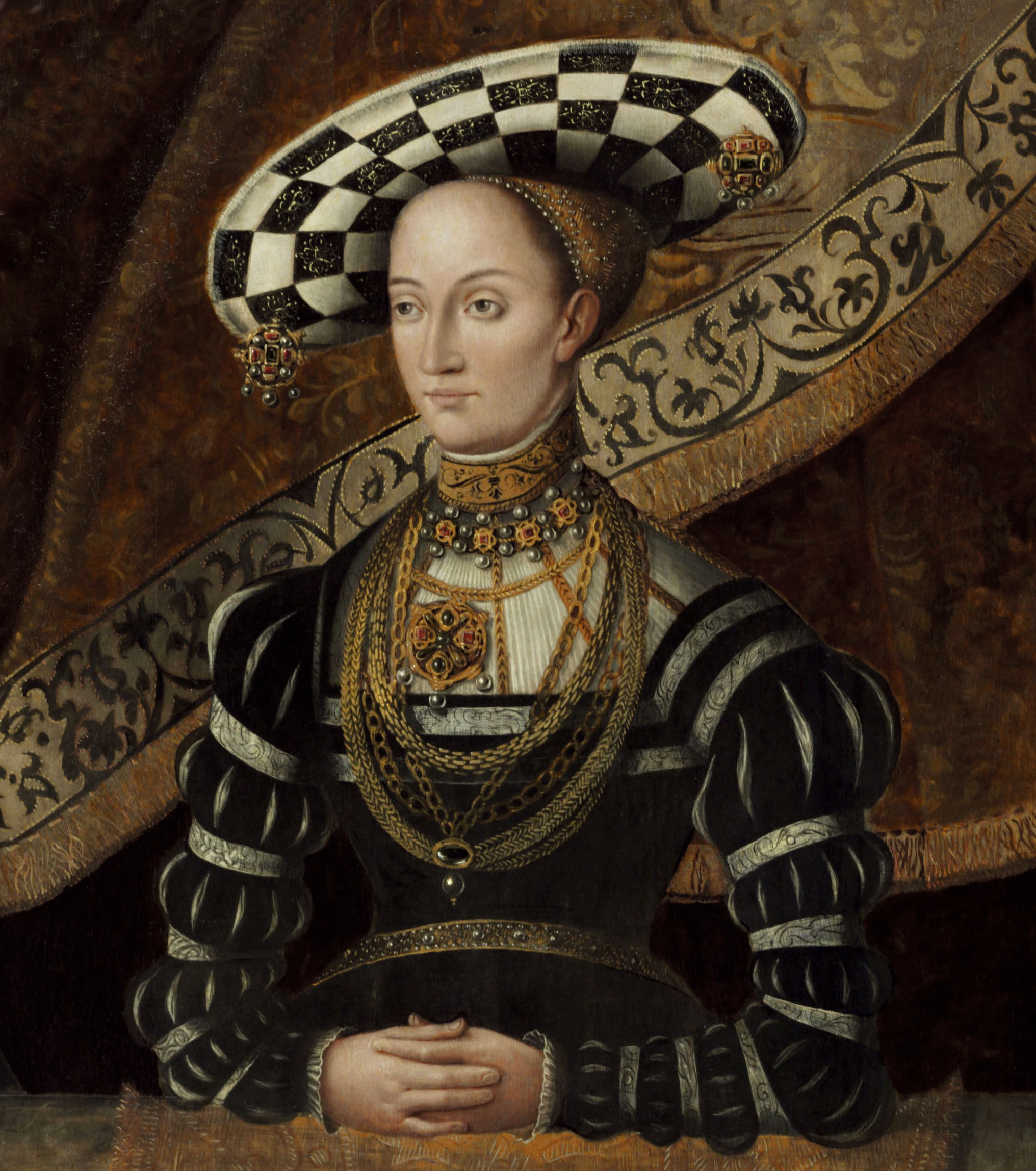
Checkered hat of Christine of Saxony, 16th century.

Check and its variant patterns have been commonly employed as fabric and textile designs used in the making of garments. After WW2, the popularity of check in high fashion increased as it was featured in the linings of Burberry coats and worn by celebrities including Humphrey Bogart. From 1910 to the late 1970s it was implemented into a variety of dresses manufactured by Nelly Don, which Mikyoung Whang suggests, reflected the shifting role of women in the public eye as it offered an alternative to the Mother Hubbard house-dress. The check pattern is often associated with formalwear as it, or its variants, are commonly implemented in dresses, skirts, suits, and coats.

=== Variations ===
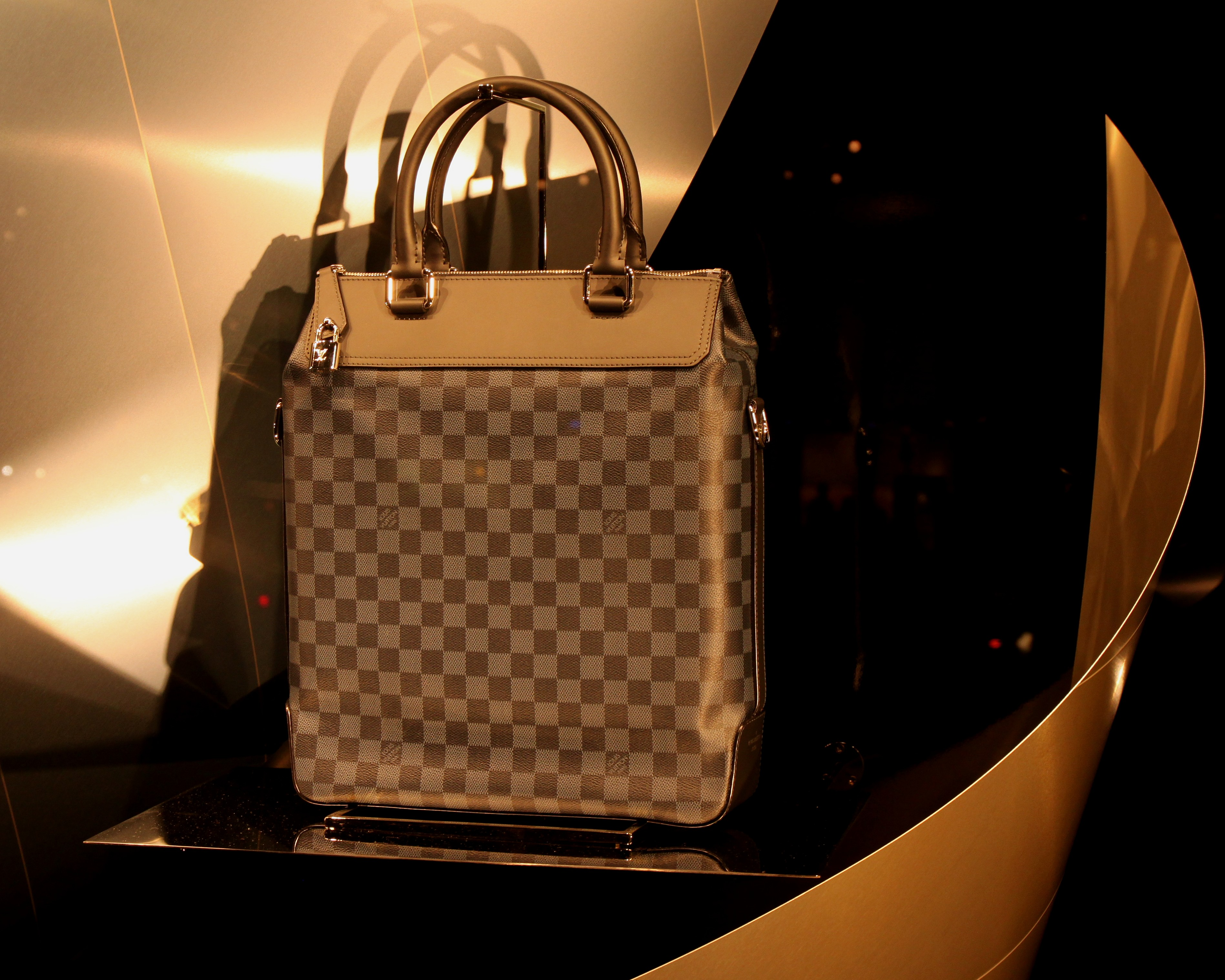
Louis Vuitton bag with Damier Ebene pattern

Damier patterns

This pattern also known as Louis Vuitton checkered pattern, was first introduced in 1888 by George Vuitton (Louis Vuitton’s son) . The name damier is actually the French word for checkerboard. The design is basically brownish checkerboard patterns with alternating colours between lighter brown square and darker brown square. It was initially created to combat counterfeiters who were replicating the brand’s signature monogram pattern. This design is popularly known as Damier Ebene.

Later, Damier Azur was introduced; it has a white checkerboard with a light blue background.

Buffalo check or buffalo plaid

This pattern has black hashes on a red background. In the United States, it got its name around 1850 when a designer at the Woolrich mill at Chatham's Run in Pennsylvania (who owned a herd of buffalo) copied a pattern known as "Rob Roy" in Scotland, named after the folk hero Rob Roy MacGregor. "No. 5310-402 in the Woolrich middleweight fabric collection" became associated with lumberjacks, as those nearby in the Pennsylvania woods were the main customers for the woollen shirts that used it. It became popular in mainstream fashion in the United States in the 1990s and 2010s.

Windowpane plaid

This pattern is "a way to cross warp and weft to create a pattern. A solid background sectioned off by narrow warp and weft stripes creates little "windows", or the windowpane plaid."

Others

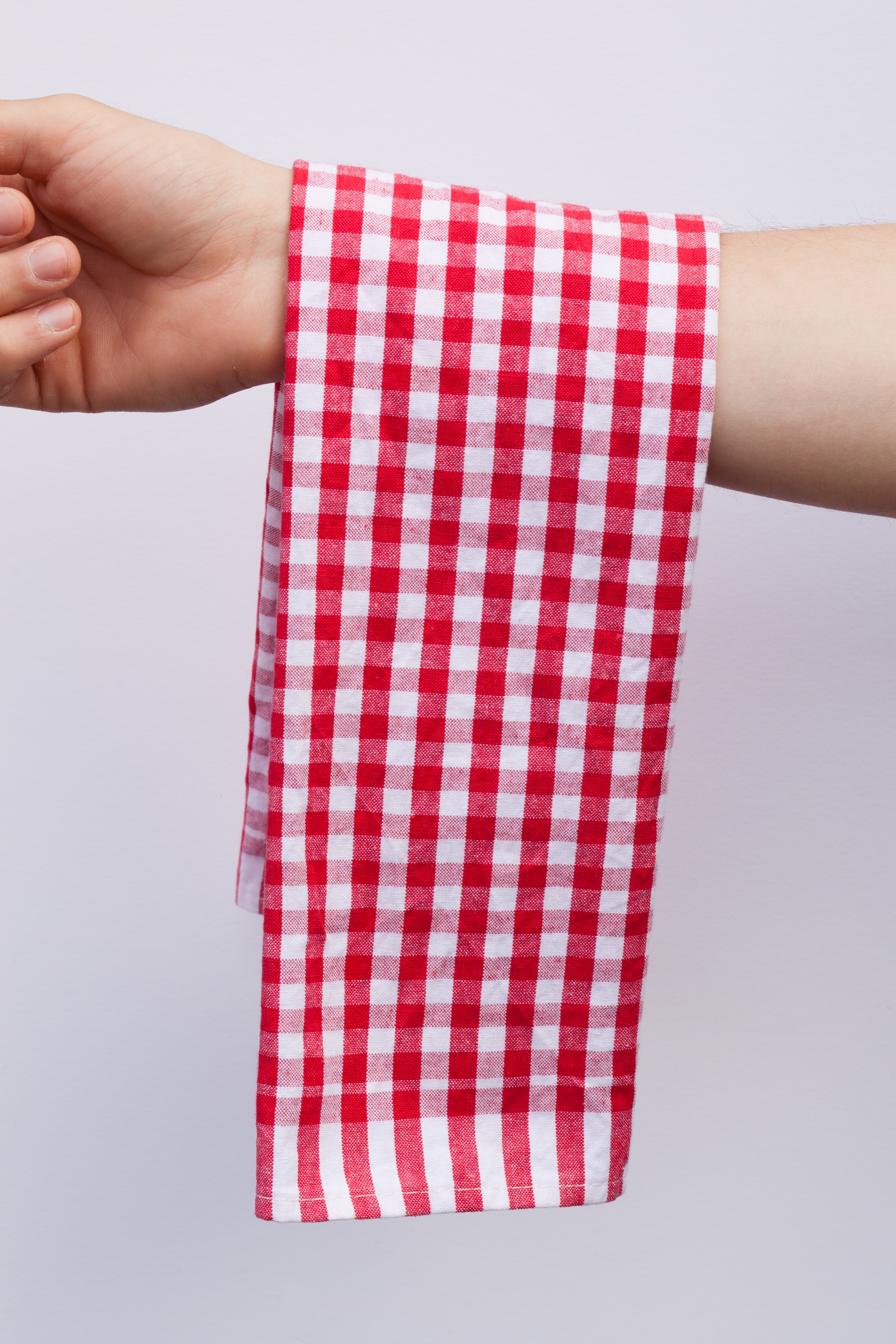
Gingham or Vichy tea towel

Other variations of checkered squares are tattersall, gingham, and shepherd’s check.

=== Ska ===
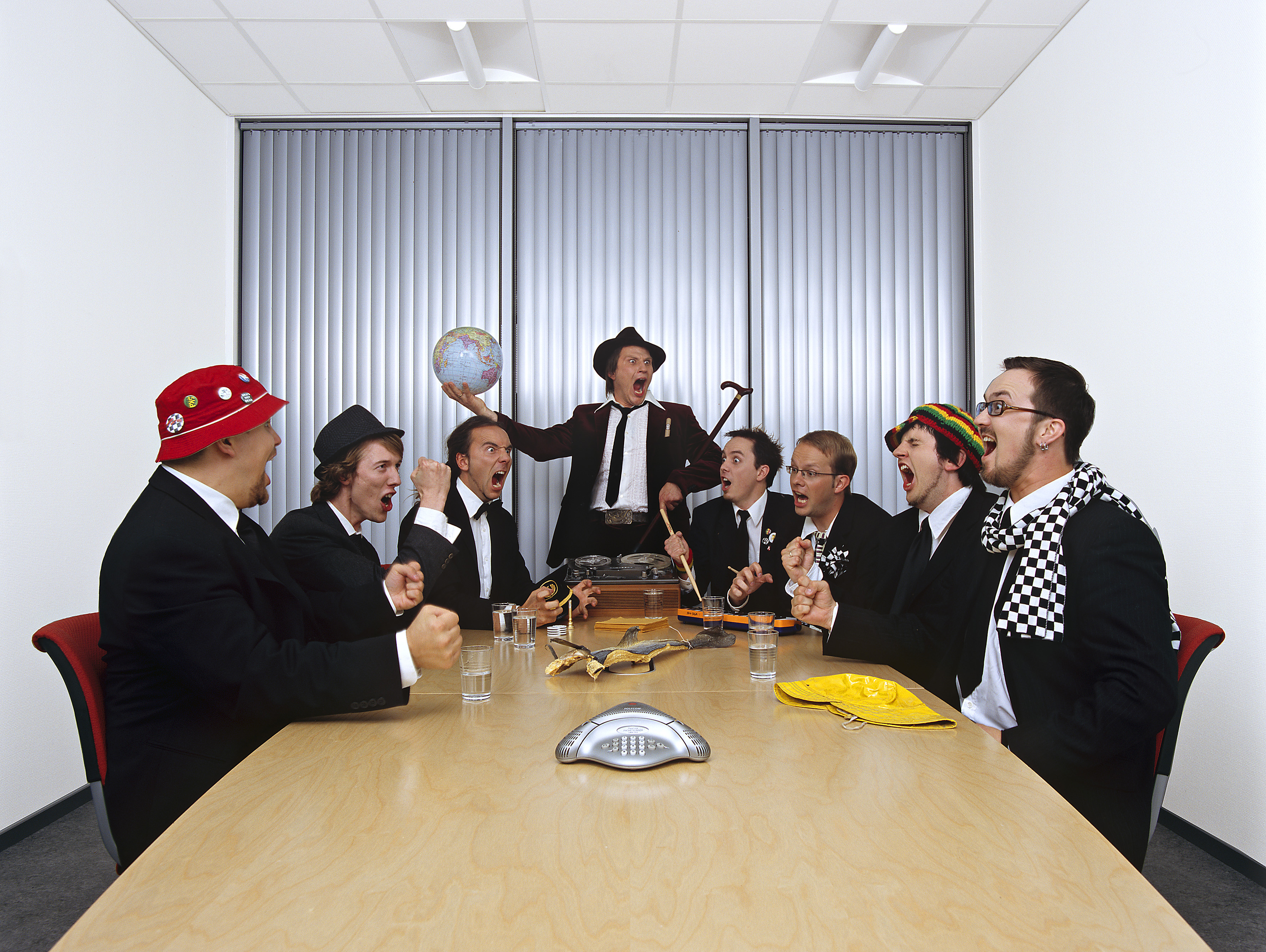
Music group Ska Patrol. Member wearing ska's signature checkered scarf.

The black-and-white checkerboard pattern is heavily featured within the music genre and subculture ska and the mod subculture. The popularisation of this pattern in ska dress is attributed to the racial roots of the genre due to its symbolic representation of the two-tone era, a ska subgenre that emerged in the late 70s and popularised in the United Kingdom in the late 80s. This is because the black and white squares in a check pattern were seen as fusing black and white culture, a notion that constituted the basis for much of the two-tone era of ska music. Some of the most popular garments worn to represent ska are checkerboard Vans shoes, check fedoras, check overalls and check ties.

== Symbolism ==
Check's notability as a distinctive and salient pattern has made it a commonly used signifier even compared with more pervasive descriptions like colour. The pattern check's ubiquity causes concepts or signifiants and signs associated with the pattern to be contingent on contextual inferences. In trademark law (specifically trademark law concerning but not limited to the American legal system) this ubiquity is recognised, as the commercial uses of check are limited because check connotes identifiable meanings that "exist beyond that of particular products".

=== Keffiyeh ===
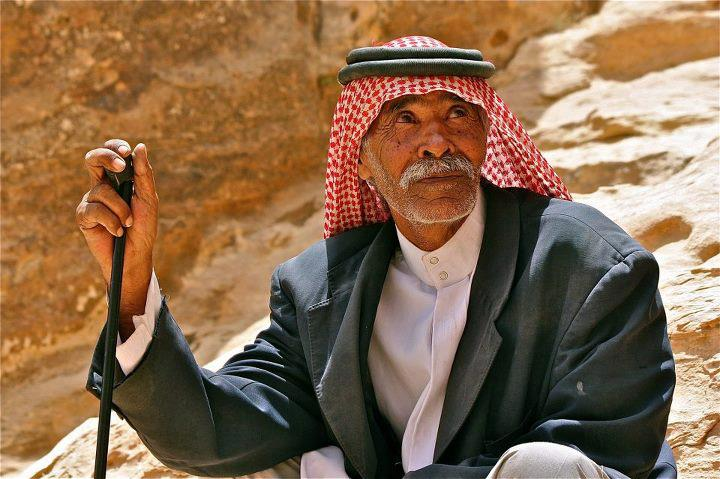
Bedouin wearing red-and-white Keffiyeh that resembles a checkered pattern

Check is popularly implemented into the keffiyeh, a headdress worn throughout the Middle East. Checkered keffiyeh are most commonly worn in the colours red-and-white and black-and-white but are also available in other variants. Both favoured colours of the checkered variants of keffiyeh are popular in Yemen as a result of the design's import into the region following the 1948 Palestinian expulsion and flight.

Each variation of a keffiyeh holds different symbolic meanings based on its pattern and colour although there is no underlying, universal symbolism to the Keffiyeh. Rather, its interpreted meaning is geographically, culturally and situationally dependent.

One iteration of the Keffiyeh is referred to as the Palestinian keffiyeh which commonly appears in a black-and-white check iteration; they also appear in different colours including red-and-white and non-checkered patterns. It was traditionally associated with rural farmers who worked under Ottoman rule but became a signifier of Palestinian nationalism following the 1936–1939 Arab Revolt in Palestine. It has maintained prominence throughout the rest of the 20th and into the 21st century and is colloquially cited as Palestine's "unofficial flag" and a Palestinian political symbol.

The red-and-white check keffiyeh is a symbol of Palestinian Marxists but is also a common pattern with different symbolic connotations outside of this specific group. Its popularity in Jordan is caused by its connection to the nation's heritage and connection with Jordanian Bedouin history and fashion.

=== Freemasonry ===
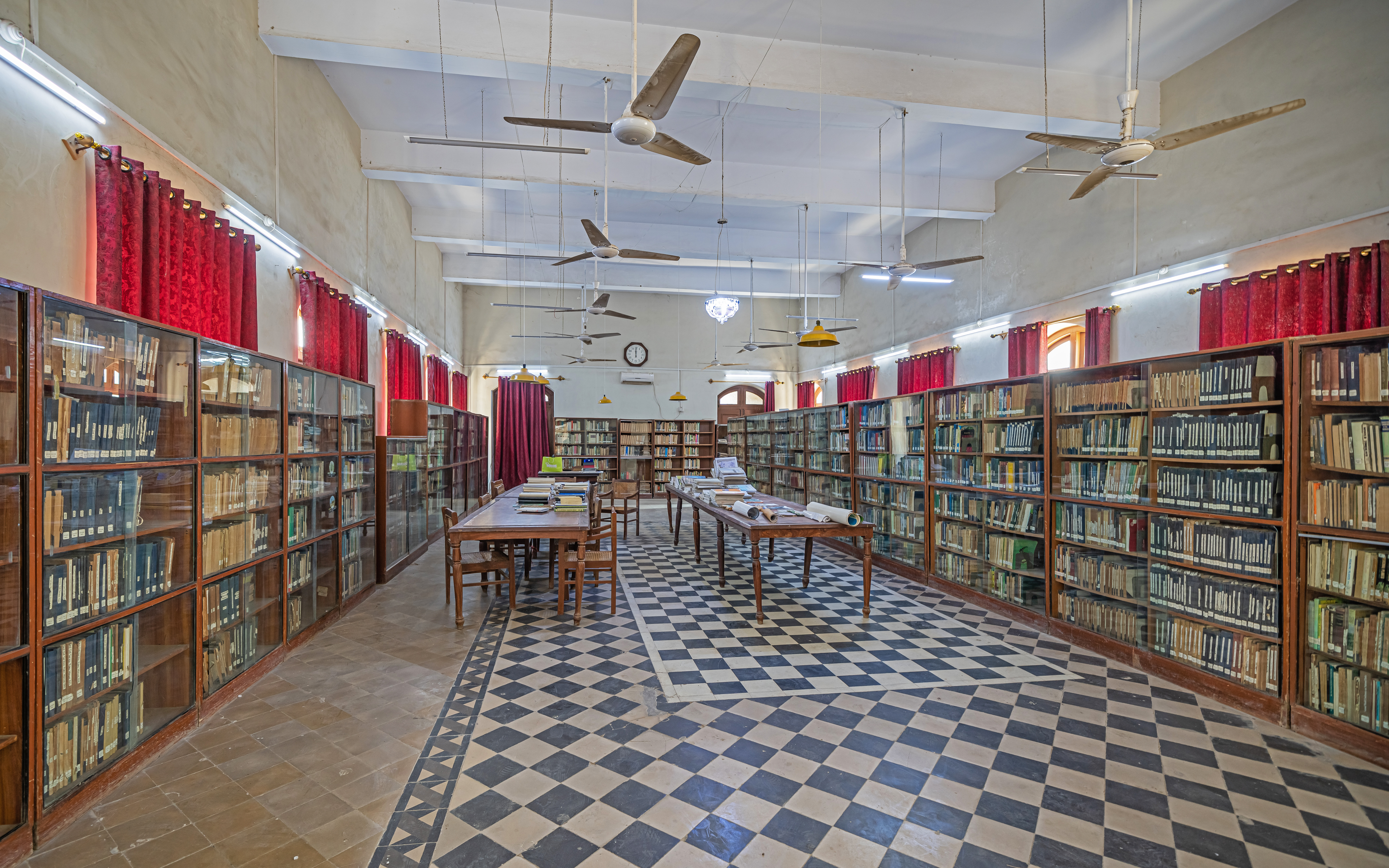
Former Freemason lodge containing checkered flooring

Sites of Masonic lodges commonly utilise checkered carpeting, tiling, parquetry or other types of flooring as the ground upon which Masonic rituals and lectures occur. This flooring is often referred to as a mosaic pavement, but glass and ceramic tiles are not necessary components of the design. The design of this flooring consists of a black-and-white checkerboard pattern surrounded by a border or skirt of tessellating triangles, which too alternate between the colours black and white. Whilst the checkered flooring is not a part of conventional Freemasonry's specialised symbols or iconography, it is commonly used as a non-Masonic symbol within ceremonies, rituals and rites because of its connection to medieval stonemason craftsmanship.

Checkered flooring has become a de facto sign of Freemasons and signifies some members' connection to biblical parables and morals. It also links to the lectures and teachings pertaining to the construction of Solomon's Temple. The idea of the pattern check, as a symbol within Freemasonry, is thought to have originated from biblical representations of King Solomon's Temple. It is believed that the ground level of the temple had a checkered ornamental flooring. Thus its placement within the lodge allude to the figure Hiram Abiff, the chief architect of the temple and the protagonist presented as part of the teachings involved in the third degree masonic stage.

The use of this pattern in and outside of ritual is symbolic, utilising contrasting black and white squares to display dualistic cosmology concerning the presence of good and evil in human existence. As Mackey's encyclopaedia of Freemasonry states:

The mosaic pavement is an old symbol of the order. It is met with the earliest rituals of the last century. It is classed among the ornaments of the lodge along with the indented tessel and the blazing star. Its party-colored stones of black and white have been readily and appropriately interpreted as symbols of the evil and good of human life.

The checkered floor's existence as a physical representation of Freemason's moral law, specifically concerning its connection to the principle of good and evil, is derived from the primacy of check in Solomon's temple. This is due to the teachings of allegorical masonic morality plays which are framed around the construction of King Solomon's temple and incorporated into the teachings of Freemason moral law.

Check is further utilised as a symbol in freemasonry on some tracing boards, which are typically used as tools or artworks used to assist the teaching of lectures that explain various concepts of the organisation to new or inexperienced members.

=== Heraldry ===
Red and white chequy in coat of arms of Croatia

Check patterns and variants that are used in heraldry are known to as chequy. This pattern is sometimes used as an identifying mark on a coat of arms.

Flag of the English county of Surrey

A well known display of chequy is on the coat of arms of Croatia and the coat of arms of the president of Croatia, which are both checkered with red and white squares.

=== Auto racing ===
The check pattern is commonly used as a symbol because of its ability to contain contrasting colours and prominence. In auto racing, a checkered flag is used to indicate that the race has finished because it is identifiable. The origin of this flag and the reason for its usage in racing are undetermined. It is theorised by Fred R. Egloff that the name originates from the 'checkers' who watched the finishing line and checked when cars had finished the race. They began using chequered flags to identify themselves.

=== Emergency services ===
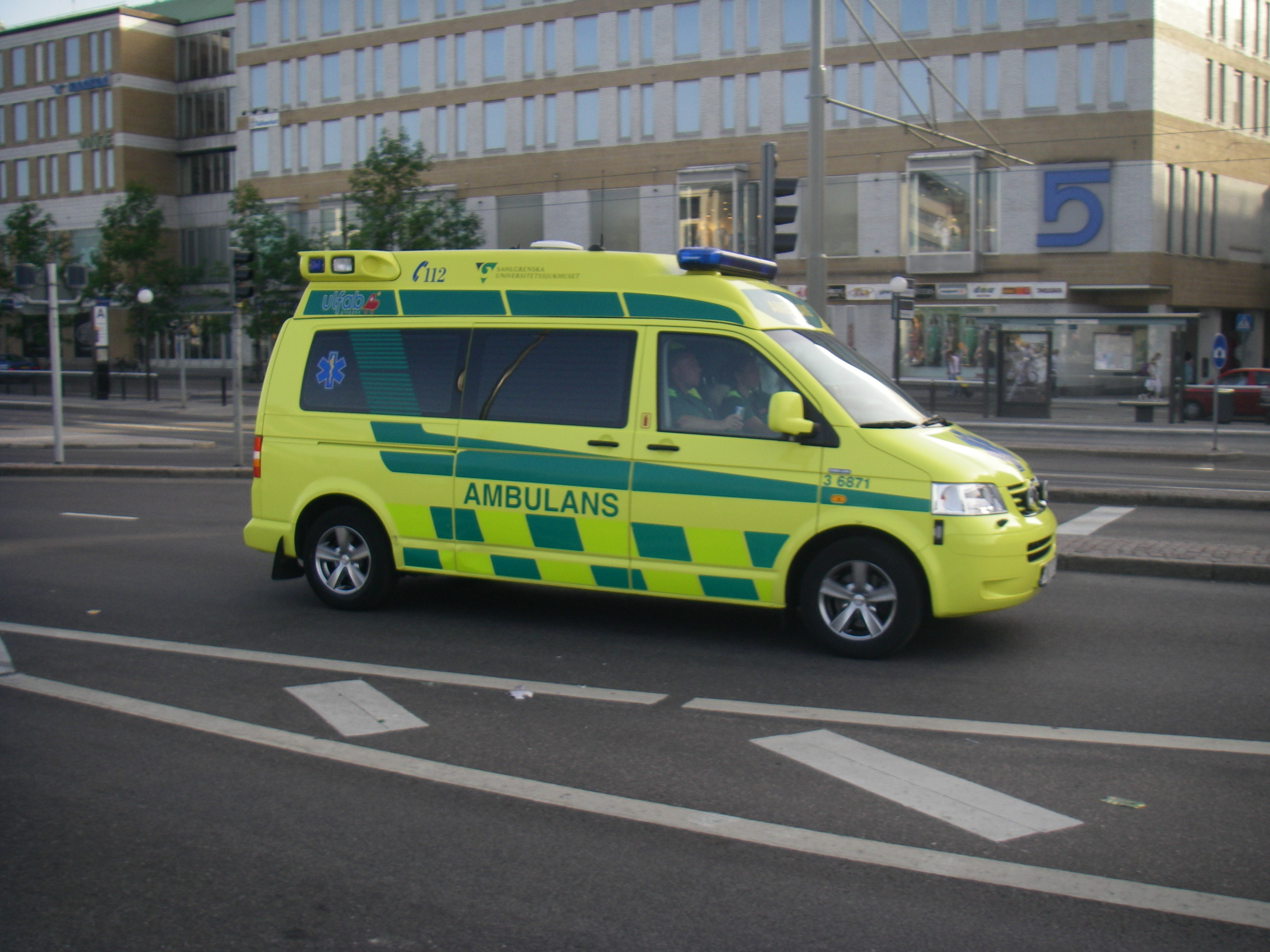
Ambulance with checkerboard-like Battenburg markings

A variation of the checkerboard pattern, named Sillitoe tartan, is commonly used as a symbol to identify police and other emergency services. It is used in numerous countries across the world and is incorporated into the design of police uniforms and stations.

Originally developed in the United Kingdom, Battenburg markings are used on the side of emergency vehicles for high visibility. These markings resemble a high contrast checkerboard pattern and look similar to Sillitoe tartan. They are usually retroreflective; this design choice was subsequently implemented into emergency service uniforms for high visibility.

=== Airports ===
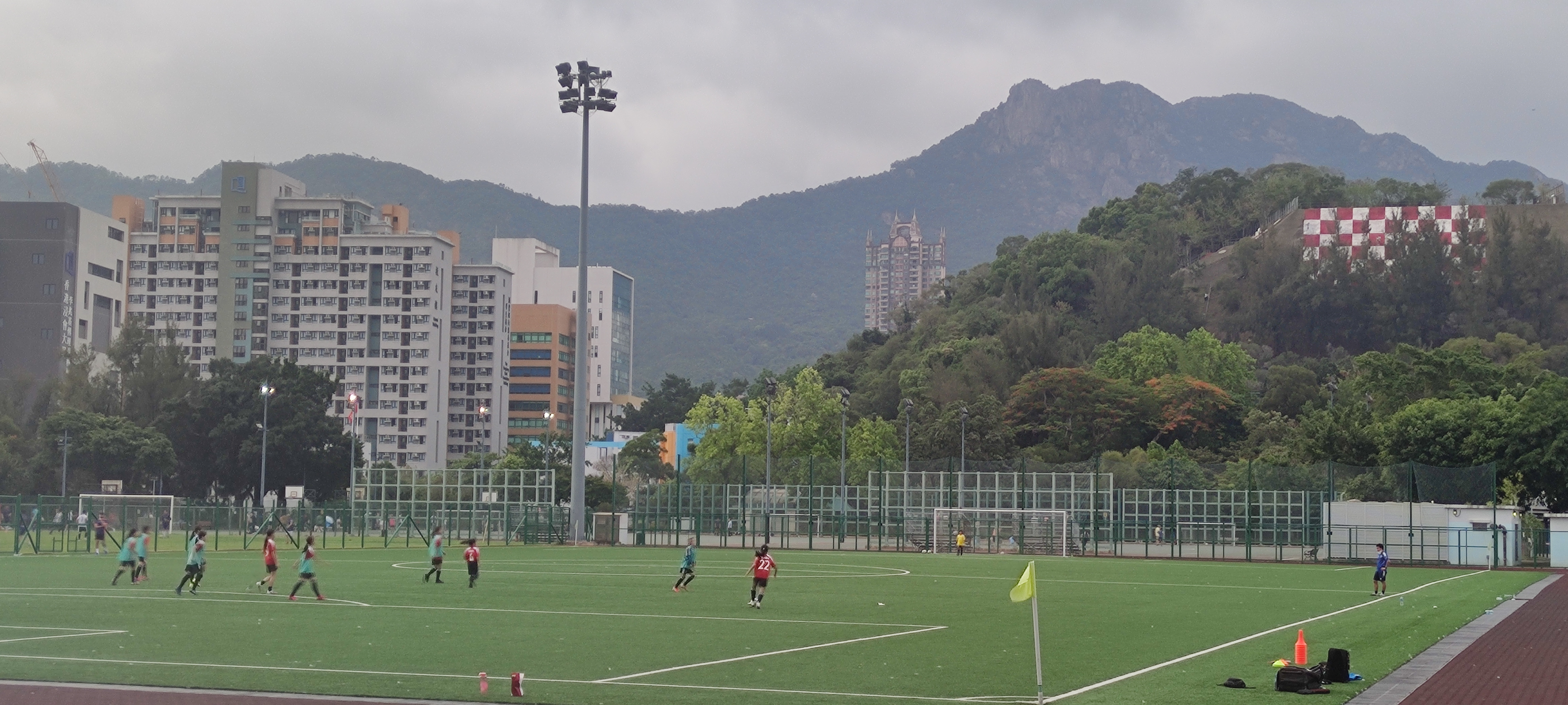
Checkerboard Hill, seen in May 2022.

The red-white checkerboard was also once a part of the Instrument Guidance System (IGS) in Kai Tak Airport, Hong Kong. Located about one kilometre away from the end of Runway 13, it was a mark to the start of the right-hand turn of the final approach to align with the runway.

== Other uses ==
The versatility and simplicity of the checkerboard pattern mean that the pattern has a wide range of utilities. Because of check's easy application to various instruments, fabrics, and other matter, its practical usages as a tool to assist various tasks has been widespread.

=== Science ===
The check pattern has been utilised as a tool within multiple fields of scientific study to analyse the responses of fauna. This is due to the pattern's unanimity, simplicity, and variability in size as multiple iterations of the pattern can measure differing levels of complexity in responses. Animals have responded to checkerboard patterns with different biological mechanisms, allowing scientists to analyse the behaviour, intelligence, and physical limitations of different species. The pattern was used to elicit different camouflage reactions in cuttlefish to analyse how they perceive size, light, and colour. The pattern has also been used by Sutherland and Williams as a tool to display the cognitive capabilities of rats.

=== Optometry ===
In the field of optometry, the check pattern has been utilised in a variety of visual acuity tests to measure the responsiveness of the pupil and a patient's ability to discern between different objects.

=== Technology ===
The check pattern has been used to increase the productivity and ease of use of various technologies. In digital images, the checkerboard pattern is used to signal the transparency of a background in a PNG file. Check is also noted as a reliable pattern to use for camera calibration according to Chunsheng Yu and Qingjin Peng because of its ability to be easily recognised visually by people and computers.

In the creation of solar panels, the check pattern has been used as a configuration to optimise the absorption efficiency of photovoltaic solar cells.

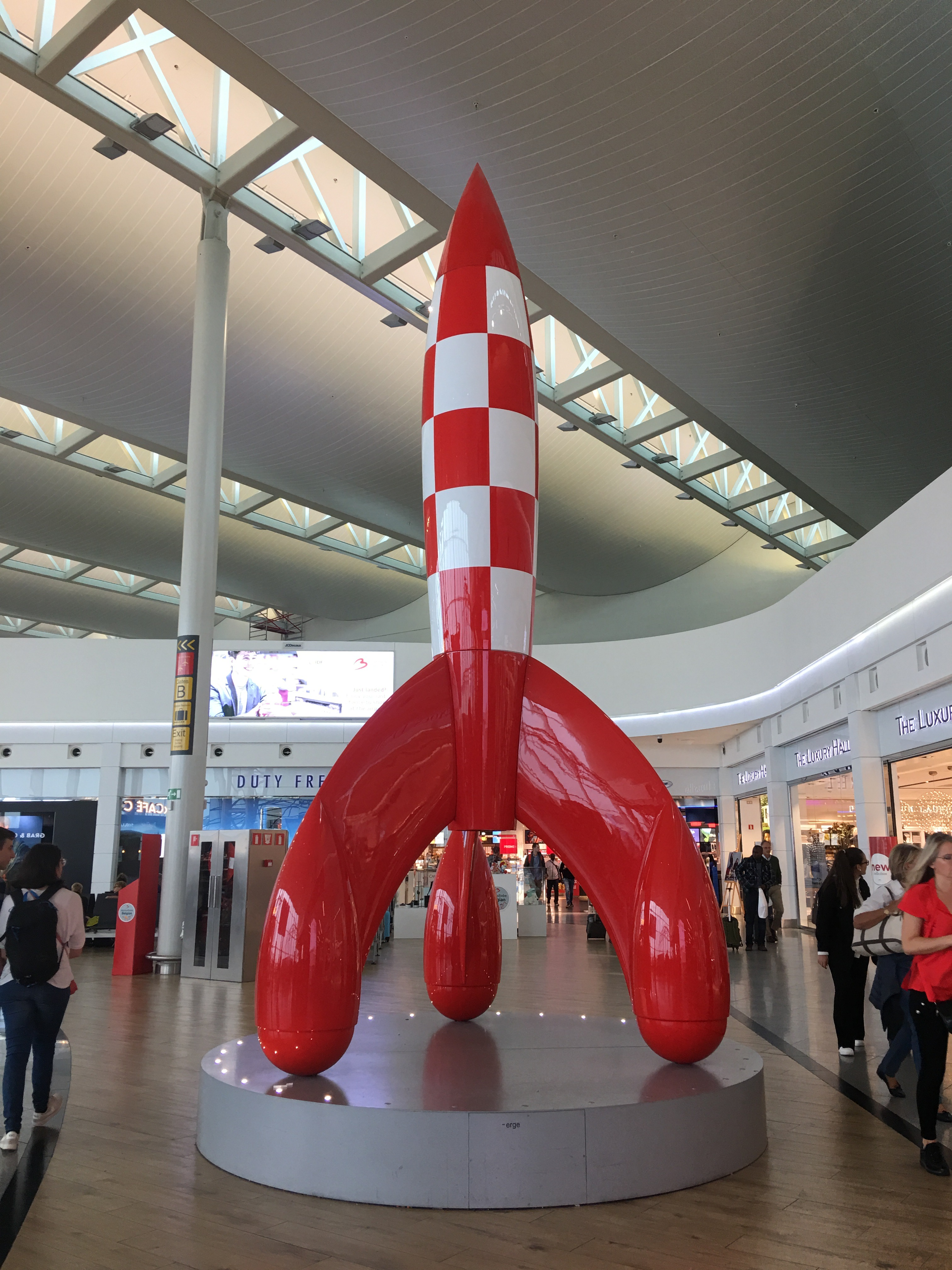

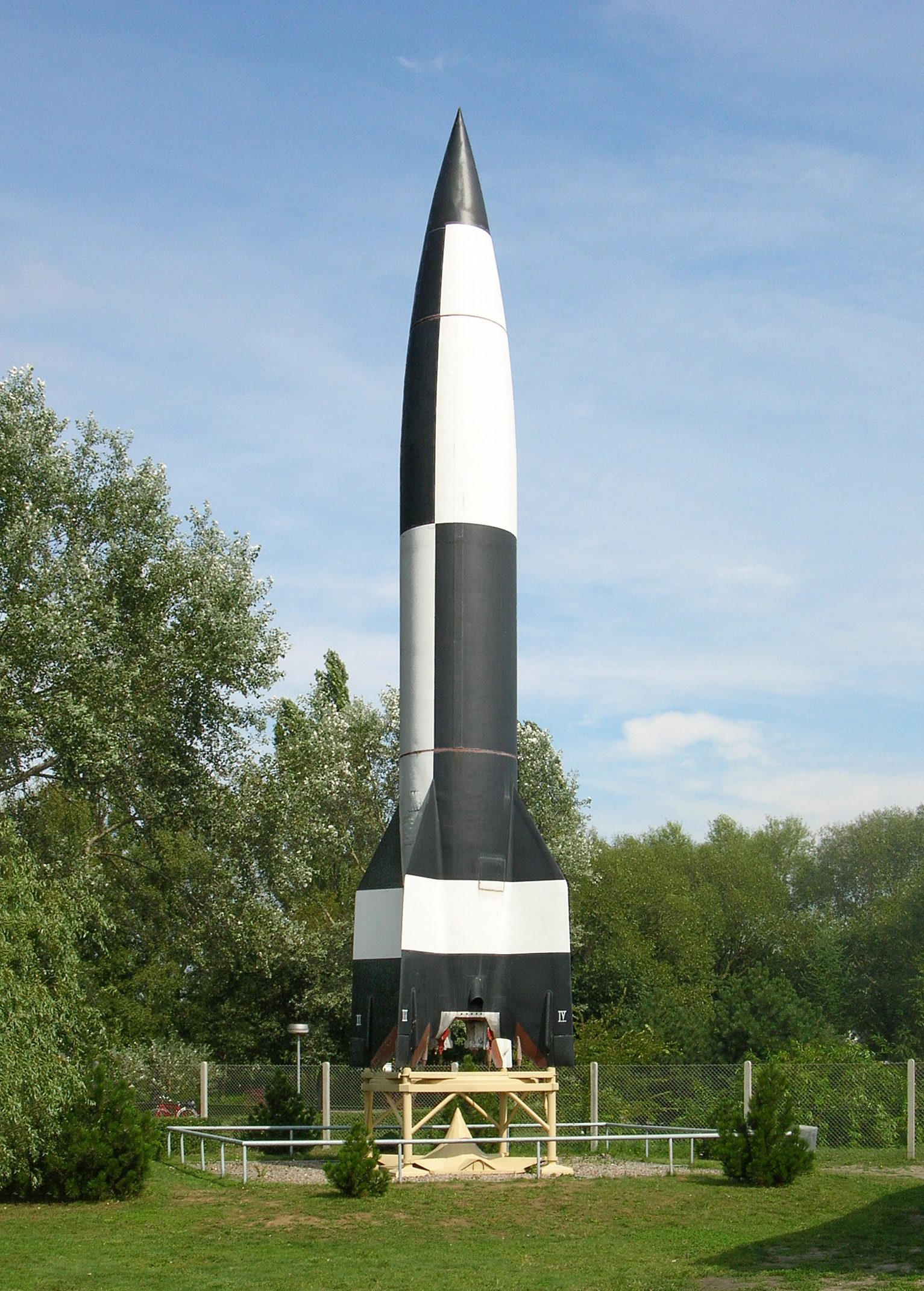

The famous red-and-white checkered pattern on the fictional moon rocket from Hergé's albums "Destination Moon" and "Explorers on the Moon" was directly inspired by the design of the V-2 rockets created by Dr. Wernher von Braun. Some of those models featured a black-and-white checkered pattern designed to help ground technicians—watching the rocket's ascent through binoculars—verify that it was not spinning on its axis. During launch operations, this visual aid allowed them to monitor the rocket's deviation from its flight path and its roll during the critical liftoff phase.

=== Industry ===
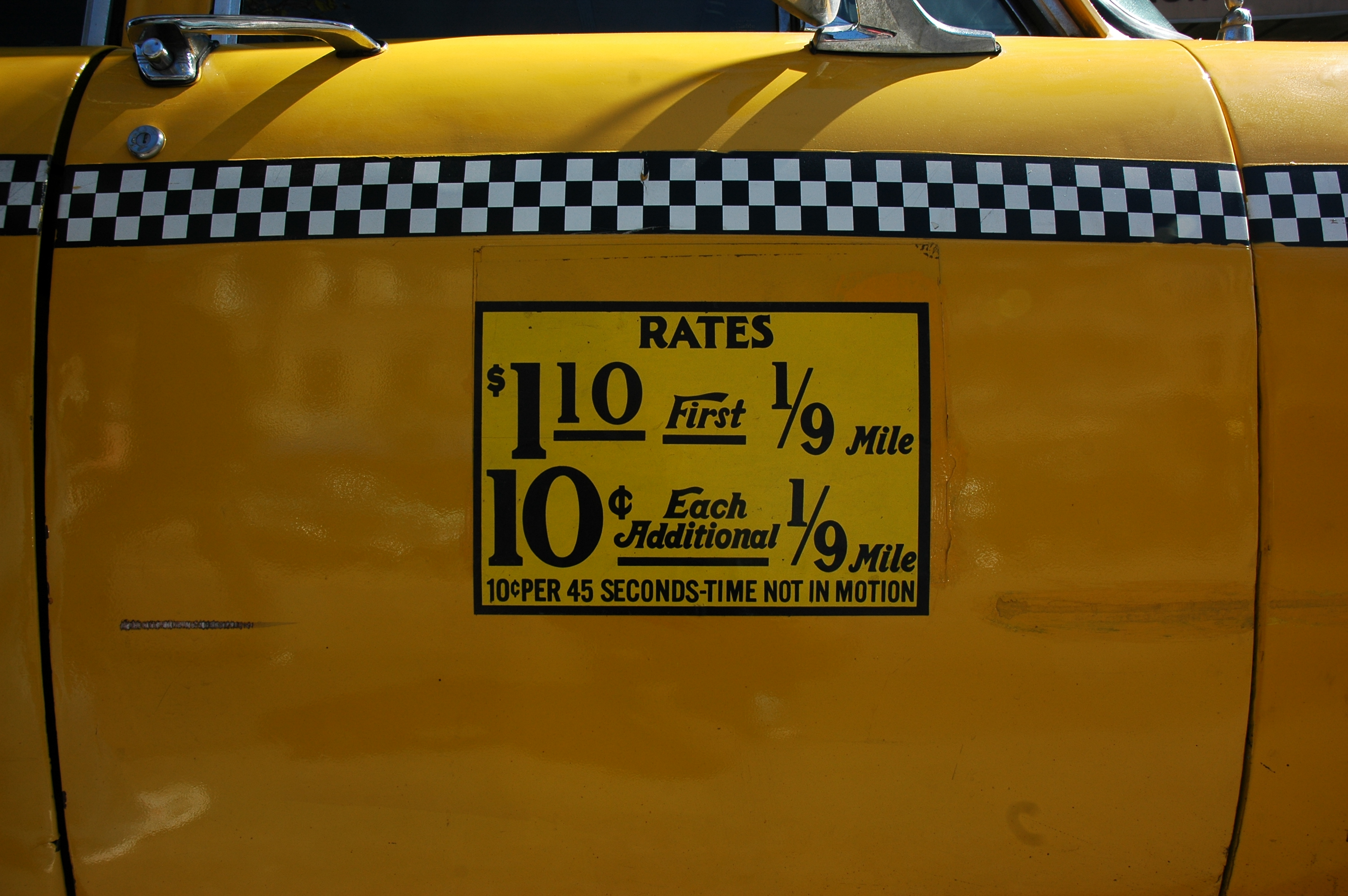

The signature design of the Checker Cab Manufacturing Company was a checkered beltline decoration apposed on the both sides of the vehicles and introduced by its former owner and founder Morris Markin.

=== Board games ===
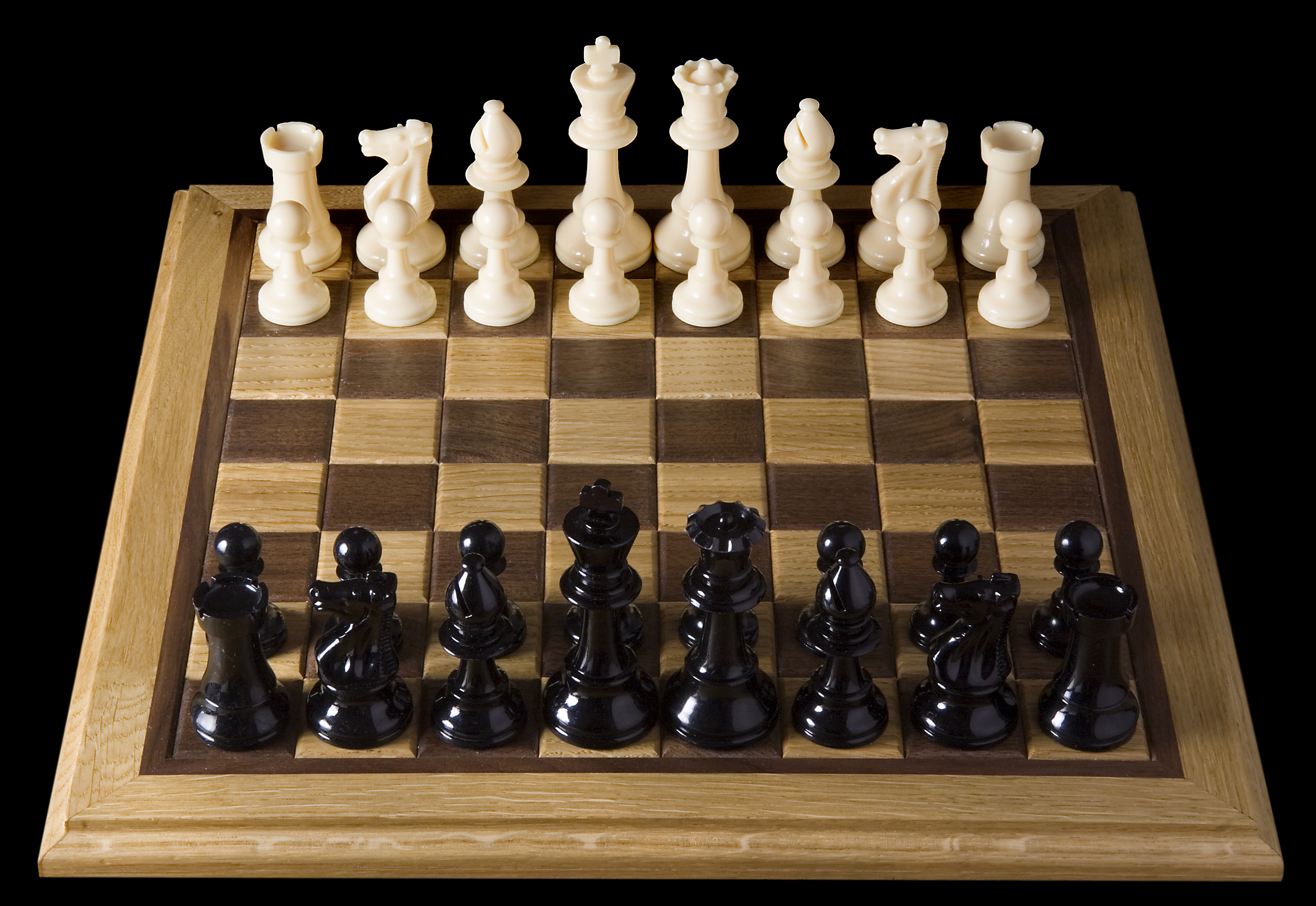
The original check pattern was the ancient oriental chess-board

The check pattern has been commonly implemented in the board of tabletop games to create a grid for players to dictate the movement of pieces. The checkerboard is used in a variety of games including chess, draughts, makruk and shantranj. In chess, the checkered board upon which the game is played is referred to as the chessboard and it consists of an 8x8 square grid which holds 64 squares. Chess players use algebraic notation to describe the movements of each player and refer to each square and piece with a specific letter and number. The vertical columns of the chessboard are called files and are labeled alphabetically from a to h, with a starting on the leftmost side of white's pieces, also referred to as the queenside. The horizontal rows of the chessboard are named ranks and are attributed a whole number ranging from 1 to 8 where 1 is placed on white's side of the chessboard.

=== Chequers ===
On a board used by the medieval Exchequer, the pattern is utilised to perform financial computations pertaining to taxes and goods. The title of Exchequer is derived from the checkered cloth or table upon which confrontational audits of Barons took place.

== In art ==
The alternating and contrasting blocks within the check pattern are heavily utilised by artist M.C. Escher. Notable appearance of this pattern by Escher include the Metamorphosis series of woodcut prints, The Sky and Water Lithograph print series and The Regular Division of the Plane series among several other works.

The artist Juan Gris also frequently incorporates the checkerboard pattern into his paintings. Artworks that feature the pattern include Still Life with Checked Tablecloth, Violin and Checkerboard and Harlequin with a Guitar.

== See also ==
- Argyle (pattern)
- Battenburg markings
- Checkered flag
- Flannel
- Gingham
- Houndstooth
- Madras (cloth)
- Sillitoe tartan
- Square tiling
- Stripe (pattern)
- Tartan, also known as plaid
- Tattersall (cloth)

== Sources ==
- Harrison, E. S.; Our Scottish District Checks; National Association of Woollen Manufacturers, Edinburgh; 1968 p6.
