= British country clothing =

Traditional rural attire in the UK

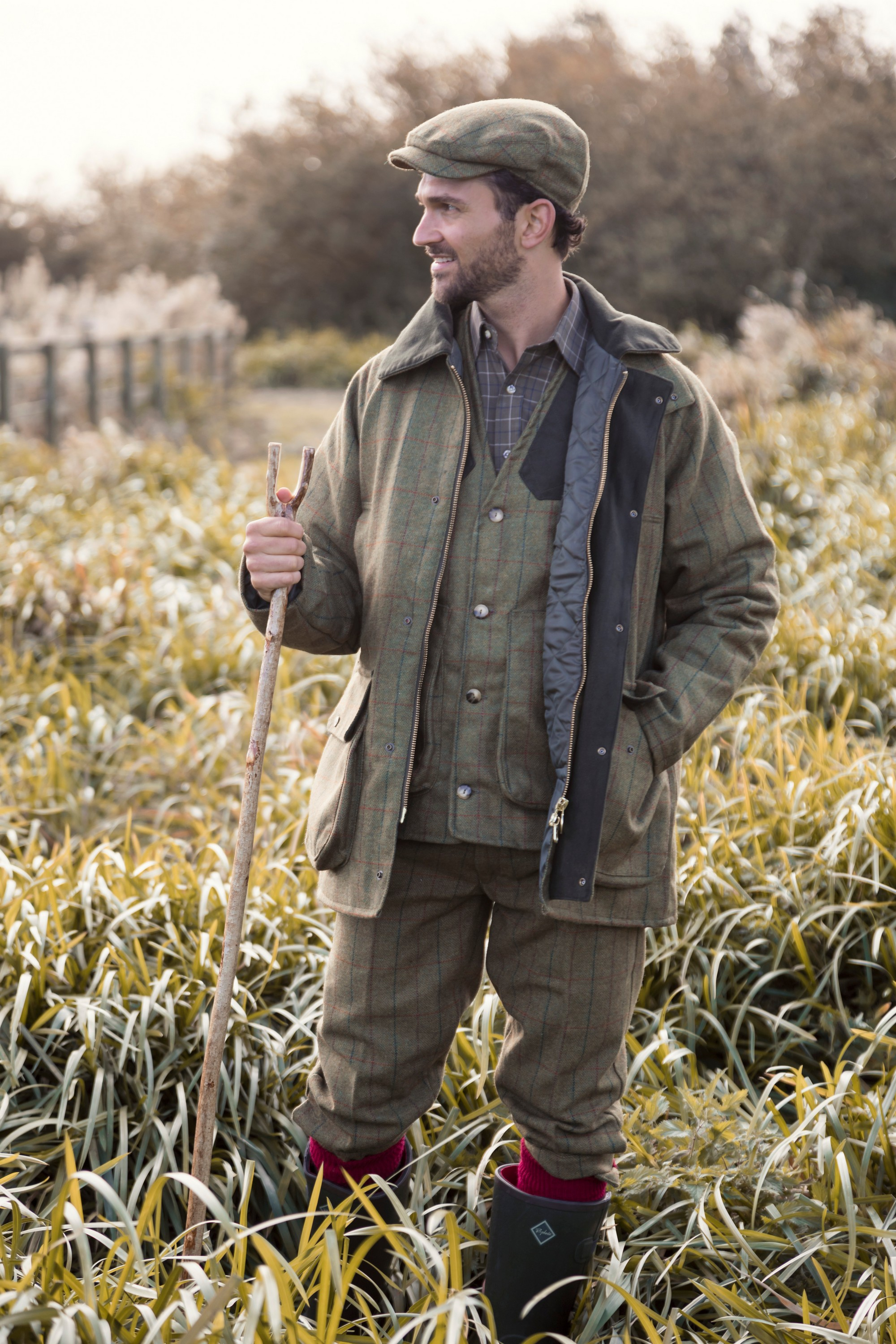
Man in full matching tweeds

British country clothing, sometimes referred to as English country clothing, is a distinctive and enduring style of dress that has its roots in the traditional rural attire of the United Kingdom. It is heavily influenced by traditional country sports, such as equestrian pursuits, shooting or fishing, along with more leisurely outdoor activities like walking, picnicking, or gardening.

Although often associated with the archetypal image of an English country lady or gentleman, the style is worn throughout the United Kingdom and draws on traditions and materials from across the British Isles. Scottish tweeds, Welsh wool, and Irish linens all play a significant role in shaping its character.

Originally used as countryside leisurewear, valued for its comfort, practicality and durability, elements of the style have evolved beyond their rural use into everyday clothing and a globally recognisable fashion genre. Its continuing appeal lies in its understated elegance and recognisable style. It is also a popular choice at events such as horse races, country weddings, agricultural shows and country fairs.

== History ==
During the 19th and early 20th centuries, what is now regarded as traditional country clothing became popular among wealthy people living in the British countryside, as well as those who travelled there for leisure. Members of the British upper classes often visited the countryside for sporting events organised by the owners of English country houses, and practical, durable clothing was required for such occasions. During this period, a number of specialist outfitters emerged, supplying country attire tailored for outdoor pursuits. Many of these heritage companies, such as Cordings and Barbour, still exist, and some have been granted a royal warrant.

While originally largely functional, the style gradually evolved beyond its rural origins. In the early 20th century, sporting elements of British country clothing heavily influenced Ivy League and, subsequently, preppy fashions in the United States and Canada. Its enduring appeal continues today, with country-inspired fabrics and tailoring styles featuring in mainstream leisurewear, and as a globally recognisable fashion genre in its own right. Elements of British country clothing have also appeared prominently in the work of top fashion designers, such as Alexander McQueen, whose The Widows of Culloden collection incorporated Highland dress and Harris tweed, and Nigel Cabourn, who often draws on vintage outerwear and heritage textiles such as Harris tweed and Ventile.

== Country attire ==
=== Headwear ===
The flat cap, Irish walking hat, deerstalker and trilby hat are some traditional forms of headwear used in the country. The flat cap is often made of tweed or cotton, whilst a trilby is traditionally made from felt material. A feather pinned to the side of a trilby is a traditional accessory for both men and women, and can also optionally be attached to a jacket lapel.

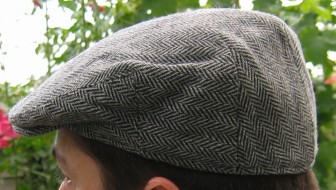
Flat cap

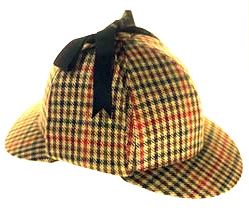
Deerstalker

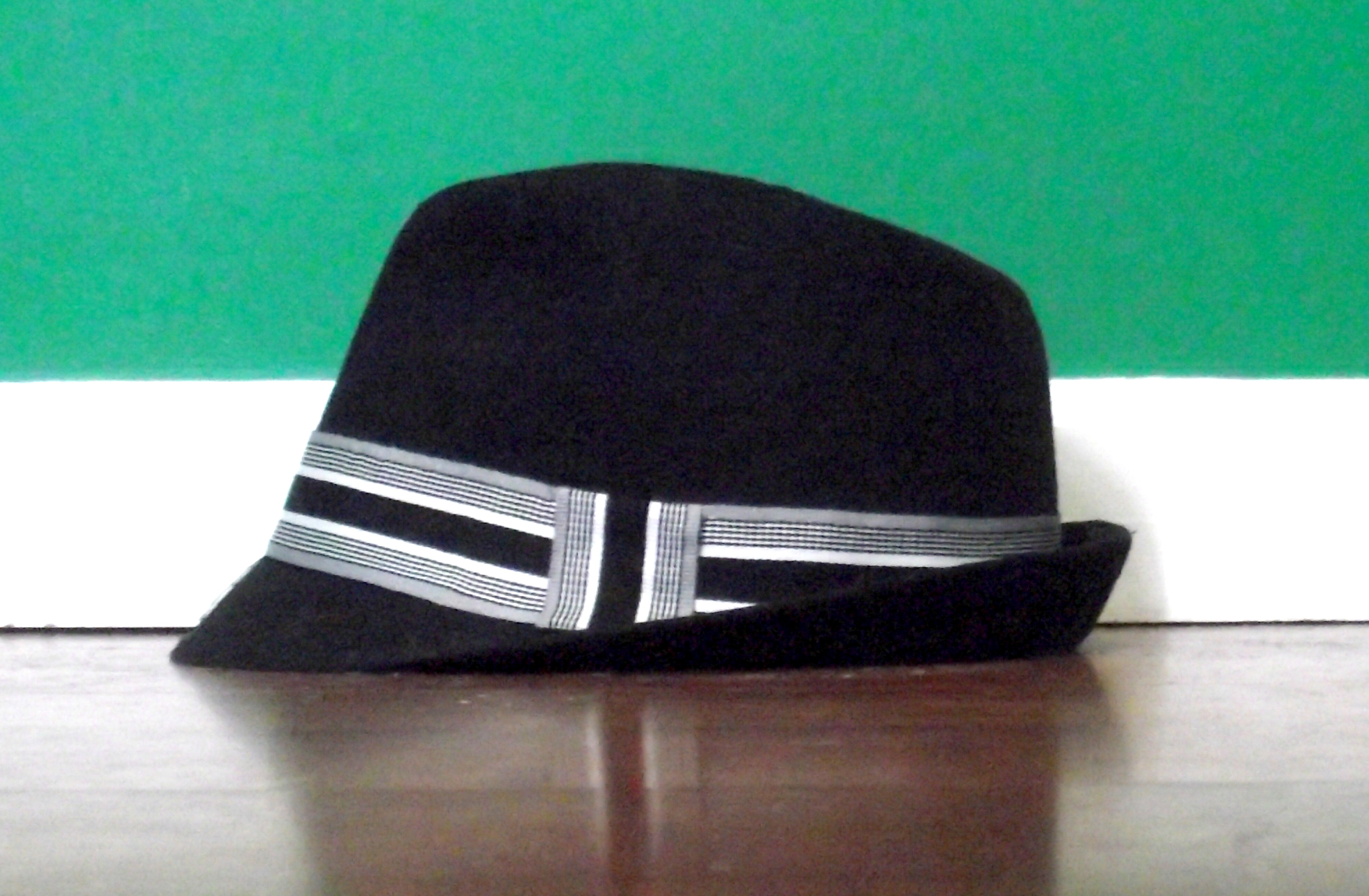
Trilby hat

=== Footwear ===
Footwear usually depends on the activity in which the wearer is taking part, the weather and conditions underfoot, and the social circumstances. Some of the most common forms of footwear are natural rubber Wellington boots and leather country boots which protect the wearer from mud and water on the ground. When wearing a tweed suit, leather brogues are usually a choice of footwear; however, this also depends on the activity or event.

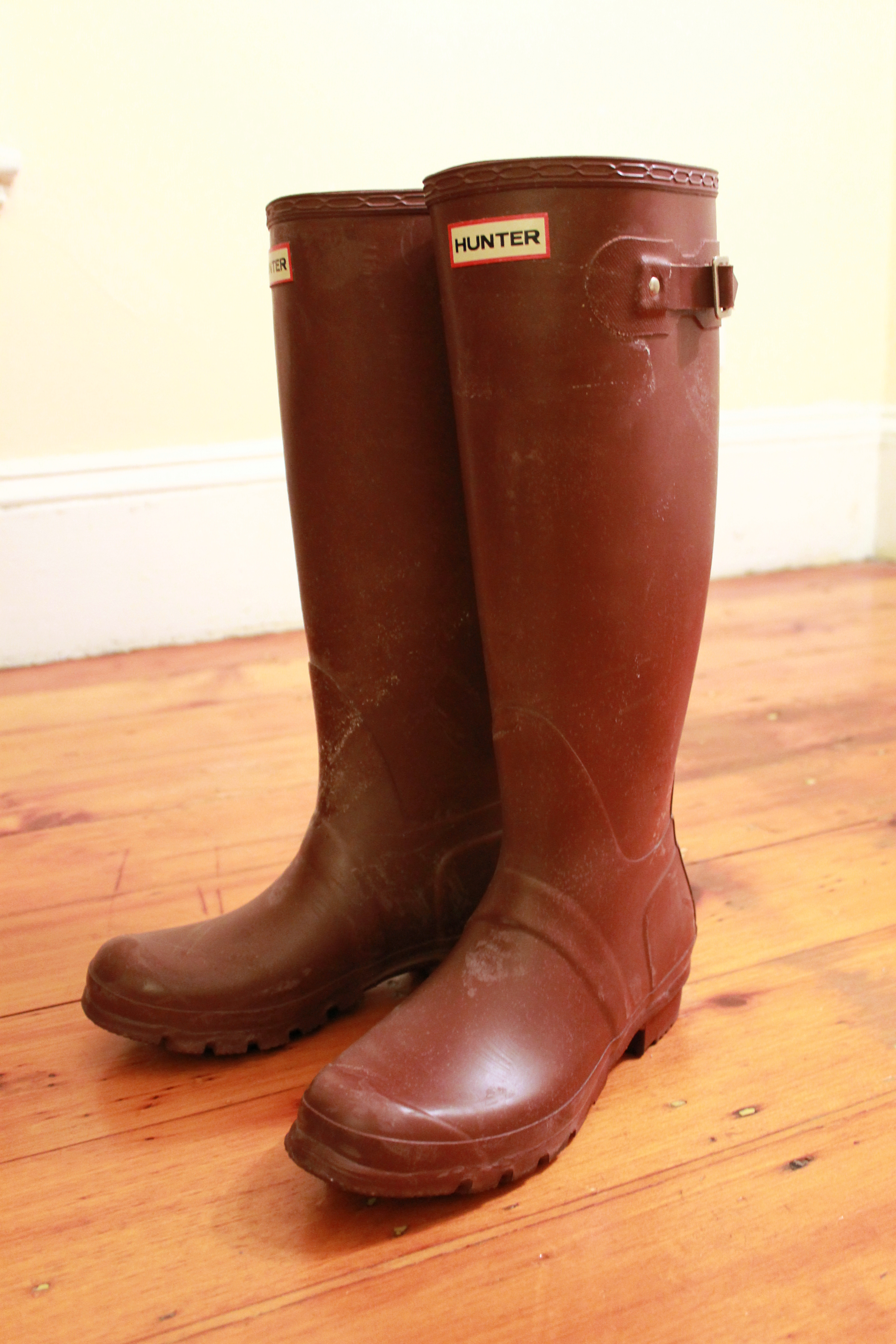
Wellington boots

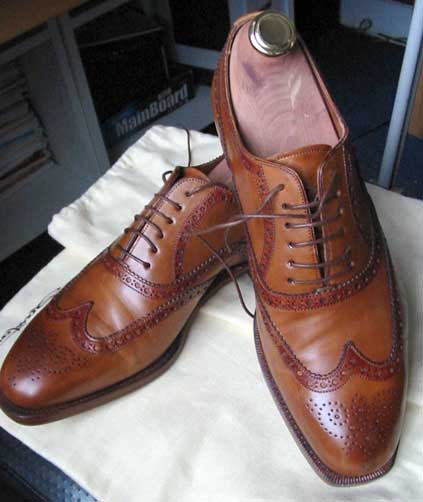
Brogue shoe

=== Jackets and coats ===
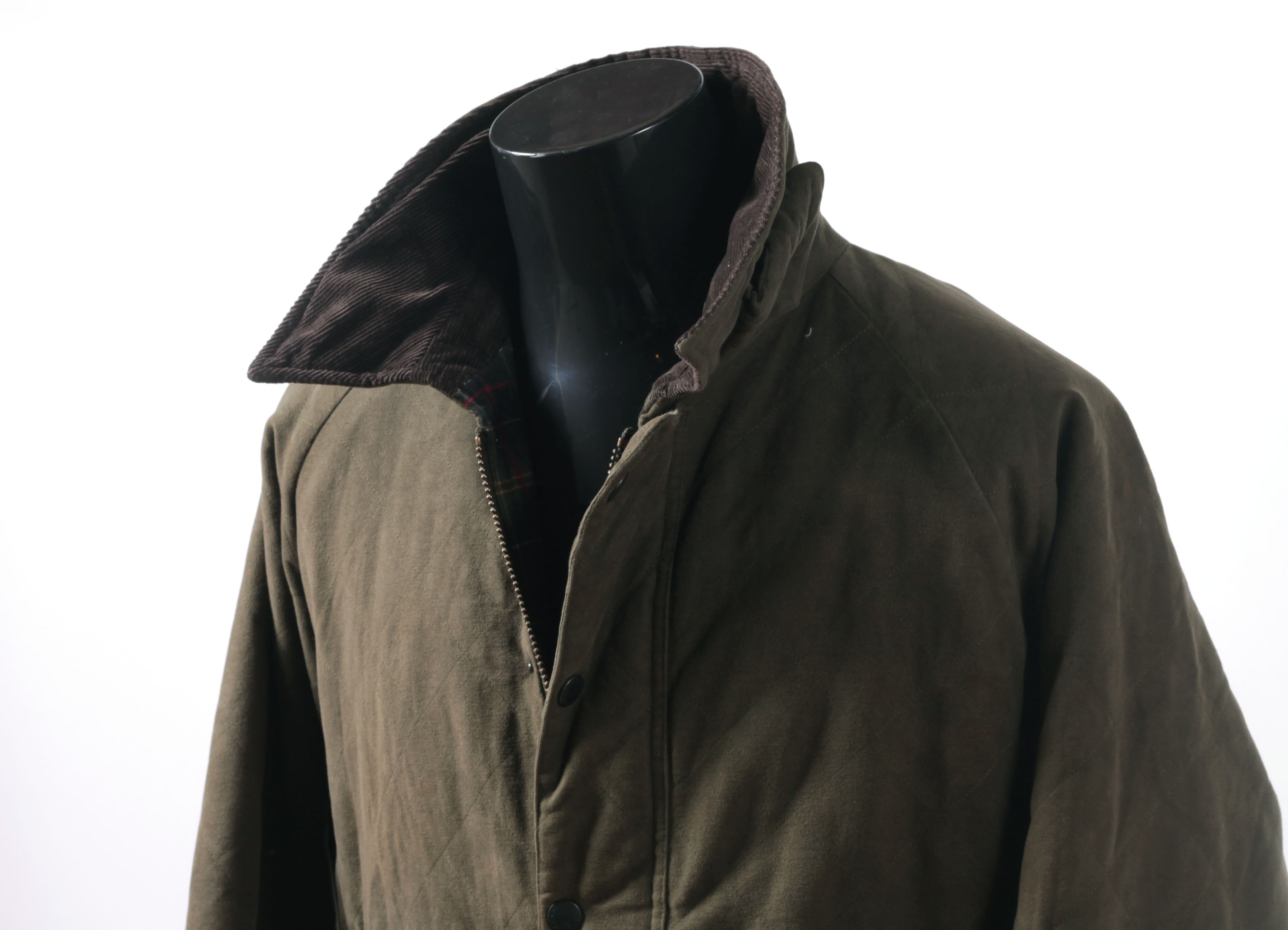
A men's green waxed jacket with brown corduroy collar.

English country jackets usually include waxed and quilted jackets. The traditional style is dark olive green with a brown corduroy collar which is based on the original colour palette used when they were first produced, which also included navy as opposed to dark olive green. A gilet is also a popular style of country jacket. Tweed jackets and coats are also worn to protect against weather due to the durability of the material. Fleece jackets and gilets have also become part of country attire in Britain.

=== Tweed suits and sports jackets ===
The material tweed has long been associated with the British countryside; when Prince Albert purchased the Balmoral estate he designed the Balmoral tweed long before he laid the first bricks of Balmoral Castle. Tweed uses natural colours to blend into the natural environment; Prince Albert designed the Balmoral Tweed to resemble the granite mountains of Aberdeenshire for stalking. Original country styles include a Norfolk jacket and tweed breeks.

Tweed suits, normally consisting of a jacket, waistcoat and trousers (or skirt) have been an icon of the English country gentleman and lady since the 1840s when Catherine, Lady Dunmore began to provide for the British aristocracy and landed gentry; it soon proved popular as it provided a practical but also smart-casual style. Today tweed suits remain popular, with some choosing the style for business as well as pleasure. However, people very rarely wear the full three piece when outdoors, usually only at events; the suit is traditionally worn with a Tattersall or Gingham shirt and optionally a tie or neck scarf for women. Some also choose to wear a knitwear sweater or jumper for warmth and to remain casual.

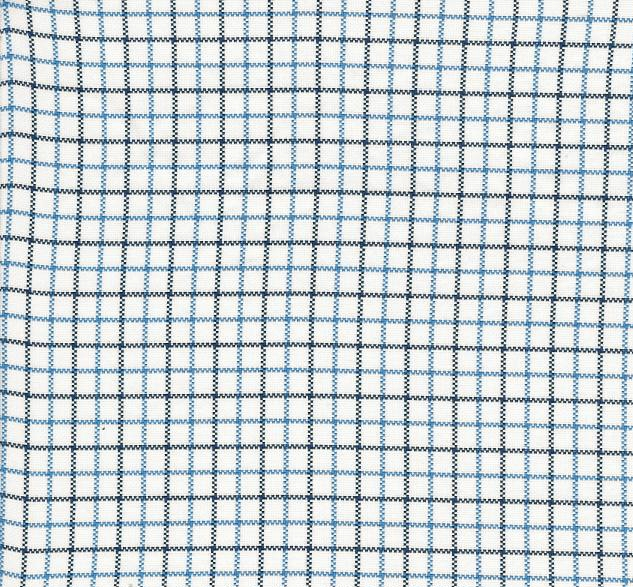
Tattersall shirts, along with gingham, are often worn in country attire.

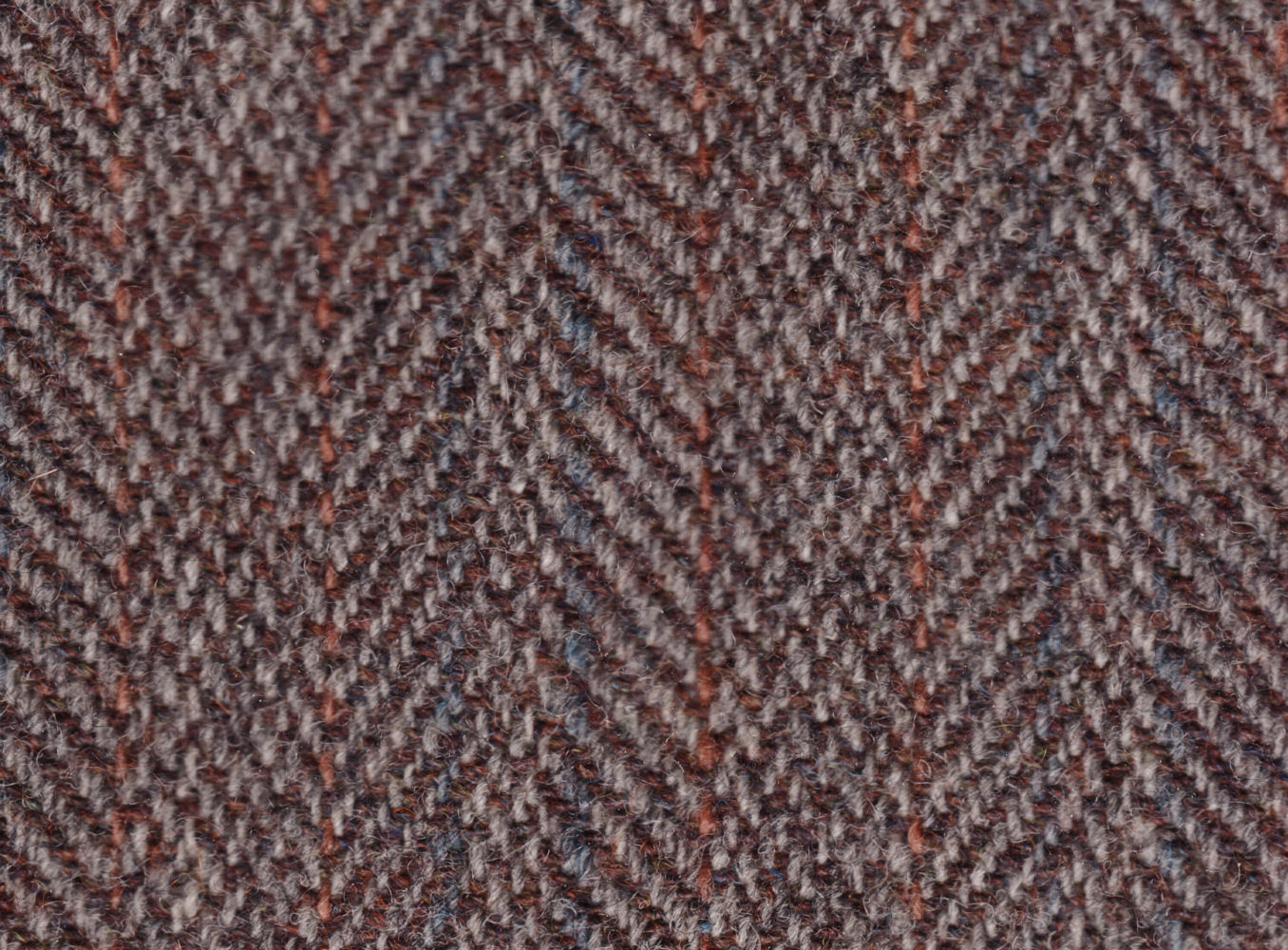
Tweed fabric in a herringbone weave, used for suits and hats

== Popularity ==
The popularity of country clothing surges periodically as a result of television period dramas such as Downton Abbey and the earlier All Creatures Great and Small, plus frequent photography releases of celebrities featured wearing the country style. This has included members of the British royal family, such as King Charles III, who wear traditional British country clothing when attending racing events and when at royal estates such as Balmoral and Highgrove. The boost in popularity has led to modernised variations of country clothing being produced to attract younger consumers; such designs, such as those by Dolce & Gabbana, have even taken inspiration from Queen Elizabeth II. Other designers, such as Ralph Lauren, have stated their love for country clothing and have based some of their designs on the style. In 2006, retailers in New York reported a boom in demand for the waxed country jacket featured by Dame Helen Mirren in her portrayal of Elizabeth II in The Queen (2006).

== In popular culture ==
English country clothing has featured in many media works, usually when scenes are filmed in the countryside or in an English garden.

=== Film ===
- The Shooting Party (1984)
- Gosford Park (2001)
- What a Girl Wants (2003)
- The Queen (2006)
- Skyfall (2012)

=== Literature ===
- Elly Griffiths' Ruth Galloway series, especially The Ghost Fields (2014)

=== Television ===
- Last of the Summer Wine (1973-2010)
- All Creatures Great and Small (1978-1990/2020-Present)
- To The Manor Born (1979-1981)
- Brideshead Revisited (1981)
- The Fast Show (Ted and Ralph)(1994-1998)
- The Vicar of Dibley (1994-2000)
- Countryfile (1988-Present)
- Spring, Autumn and Winterwatch (2005-Present)
- Downton Abbey (2010-2015)
- The Crown (2016-2023)
- The Gentlemen (2024-2026)

== See also ==
- Tracht – Worn in Bavaria, Austria and South Tyrol
- Teba jacket – Worn in Great Britain, Spain, France and Austria
- Sloane Ranger
