= Gingham =

Type of fabric

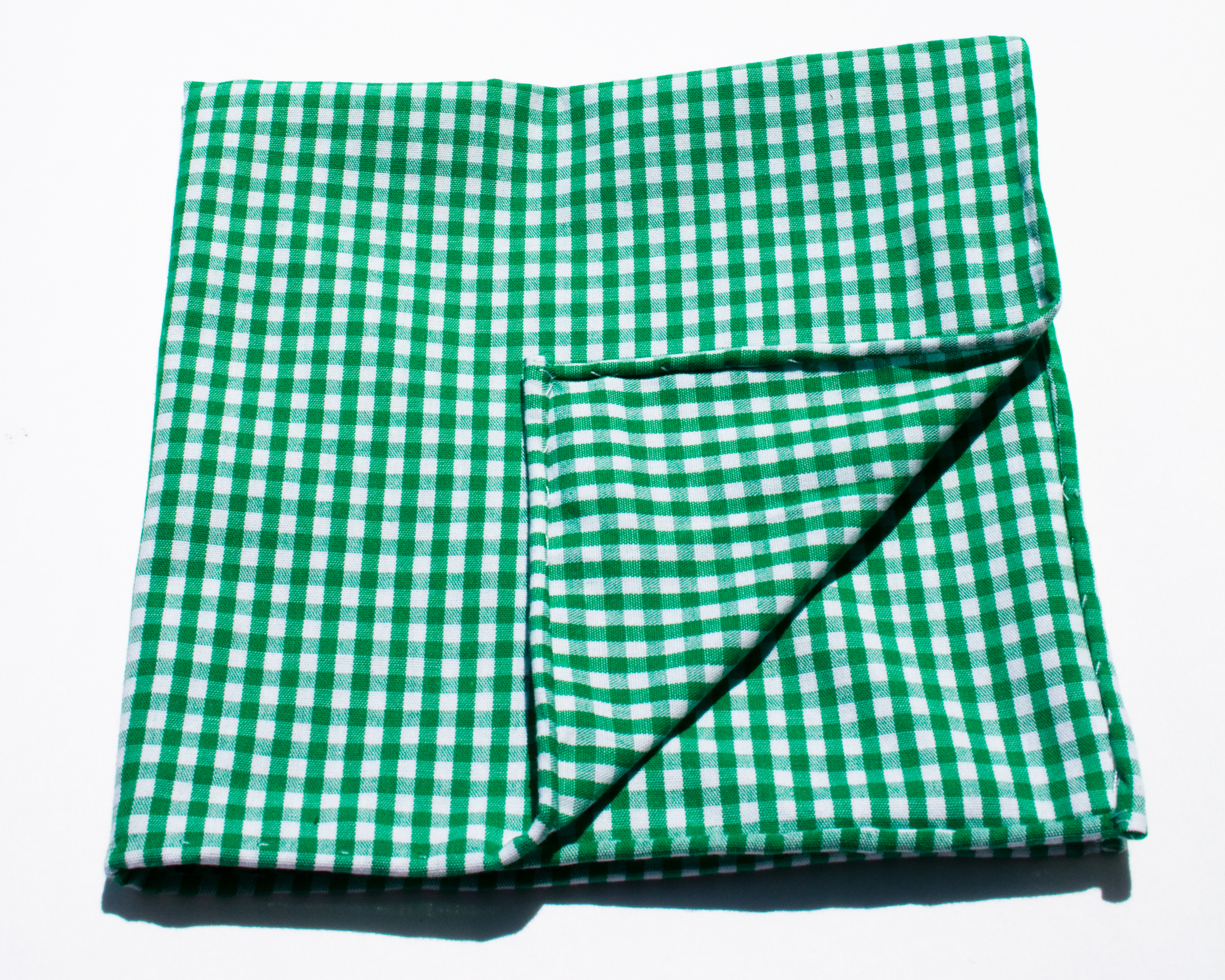
Gingham cloth with green and white checks

Gingham, also called Vichy check, is a medium-weight balanced plain-woven fabric typically with tartan (plaid), striped, or check duotone patterns, in bright colour and in white made from dyed cotton or cotton-blend yarns. It is made of carded, medium or fine yarns.

== History ==
It is speculated that the fabric now known as gingham may have been made at Guingamp, a town in Brittany, France, and that the fabric may be named after the town. Some sources say that the name came into English via Dutch. Other sources stated that the word 'Gingham' came from Malay 'Genggang' (meaning: striped).

When originally imported into Europe in the 17th century, gingham was a striped fabric, though now it is distinguished by its checkered pattern. From the mid-18th century, when it was being produced in the mills of Manchester, England, it started to be woven into checked or tartan (plaid) patterns (often blue and white). Checked gingham became more common over time, though striped gingham was still available in the late Victorian period. Gingham was introduced to France from Malaysia, where it started being produced in Vichy, France, under the reign of Napoleon Bonaparte. In Spain the pattern is known as estampado vichy or cuadro vichy.

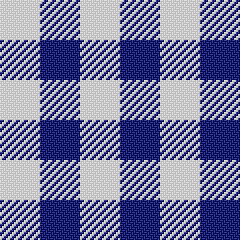
Simple gingham pattern in white and blue

In the United States, the mass popularity of men's blue and white gingham-patterned shirts in the 2010s led to critical media coverage of the phenomenon.

== Use ==
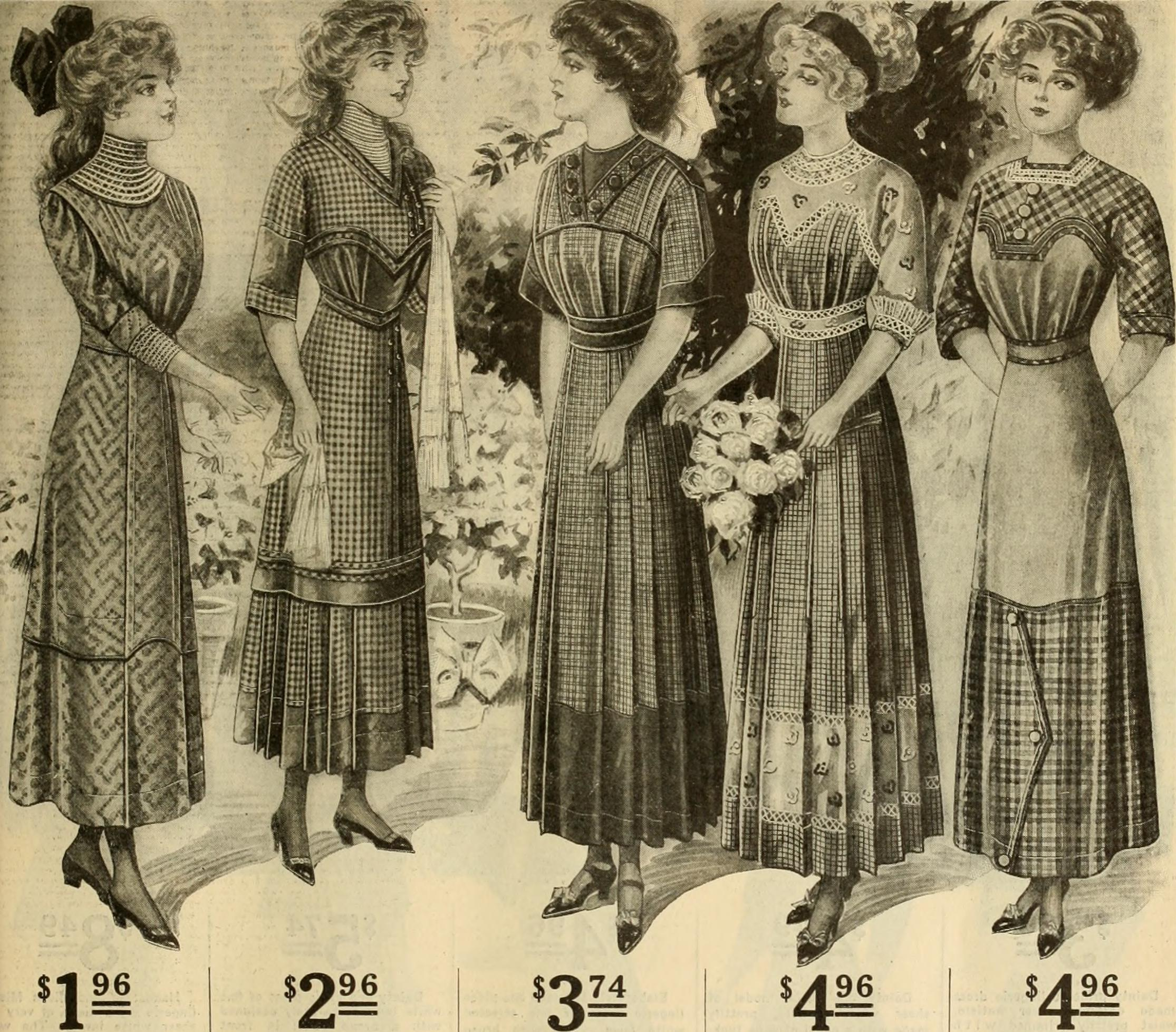
Gingham patterns in a 1911 Macy's catalogue

Gingham fabric was popular to use in various dress material such as shirts, skirts, maxi and also for some home furnishing such as towels and curtains. Along with muslin, gingham is often used as a test fabric while designing fashion or used for making an inexpensive fitting shell prior to making the clothing in fashion fabric. Gingham shirts have been worn by mods since the 1960s and continue to be identified with fans of indie and mod music with brands like Lambretta Clothing, Ben Sherman, Fred Perry, Penguin and Merc producing gingham shirts.

In the United Kingdom, the gingham pattern is often used for younger girls' school uniforms.

== See also ==
- British country clothing
- Madras cloth
- Railroad stripe
- Gamucha
- Keffiyeh
- Tartan
- Tattersall (cloth)
