= Bedford cord =

Durable woven textile with a warp-wise rib

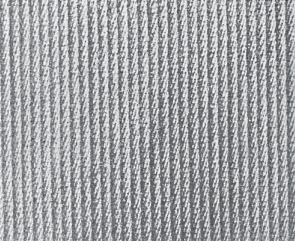
Bedford Cord

Bedford cord, named after the town of New Bedford, Massachusetts, a famous 19th century textile manufacturing city, is a durable fabric that resembles corduroy. The weave has faint lengthwise ridges, but without the filling yarns that make the distinct wales characteristic of corduroy. It can have the appearance of narrow-width stripes with thin lines between.

== Usage ==
Because of its stiff construction, it is often used in upholstery or in outerwear that does not require draping. Trousers made with Bedford cord are sometimes called "Bedford cords".

A water-repellent cotton version of Bedford cord called Jungle Cloth was used by the U.S. Navy for flight clothing during the 1920s-1940s era. Today Jungle Cloth is made exclusively in Japan on special order to the garment trade. It is about 14 oz in weight and is not water treated.

In 1893 a dress made of Bedford cord figured into the trial of Lizzie Borden. Various testimonies about "the Bedford Cord" gave conflicting ideas as to whether the dress, which was burned by Borden after the murders of her father and stepmother, was stained by blood or by paint.
