= Corduroy =

Durable woven fabric with warp-wise stripes of cut pile

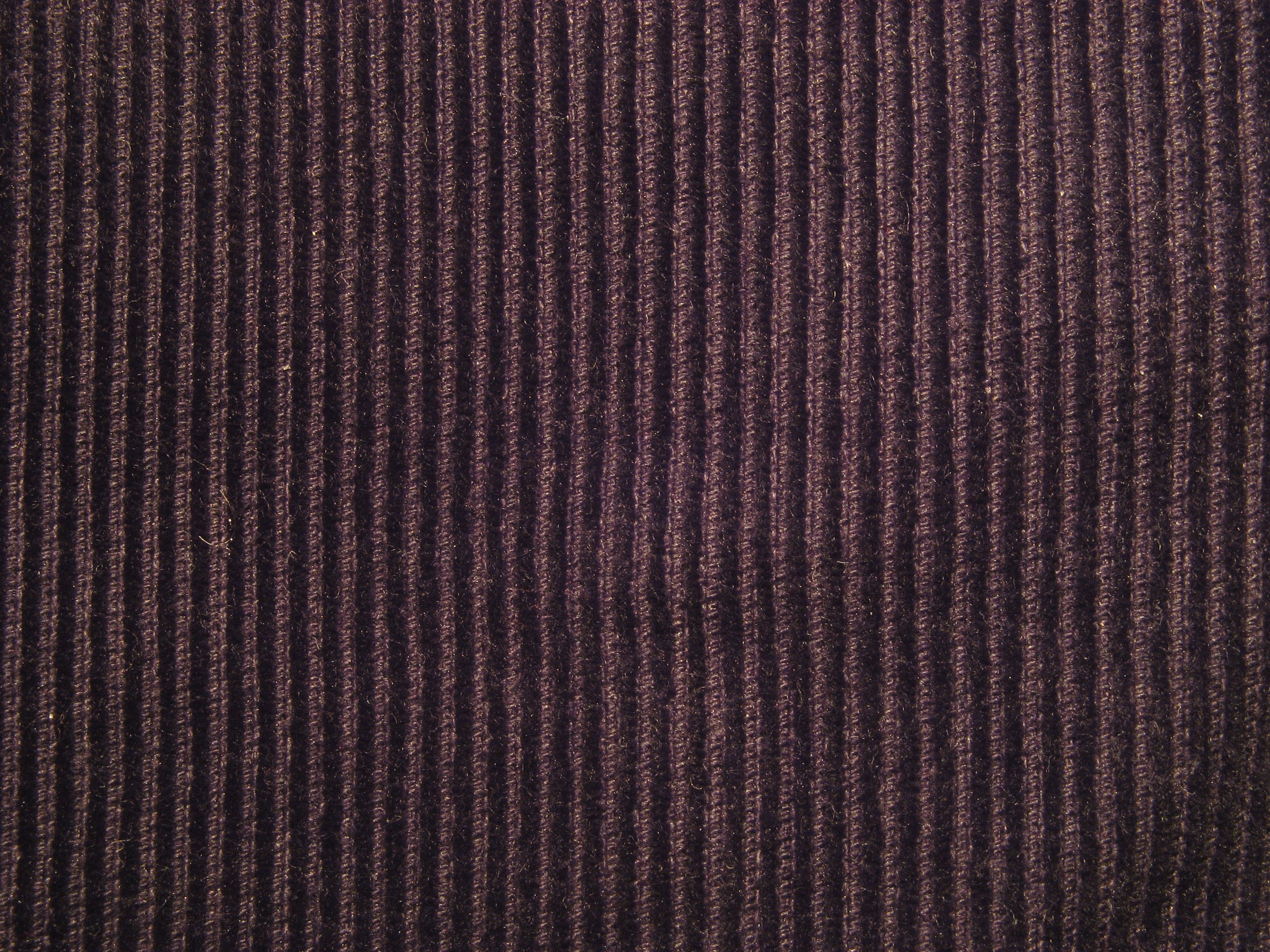
Cotton corduroy

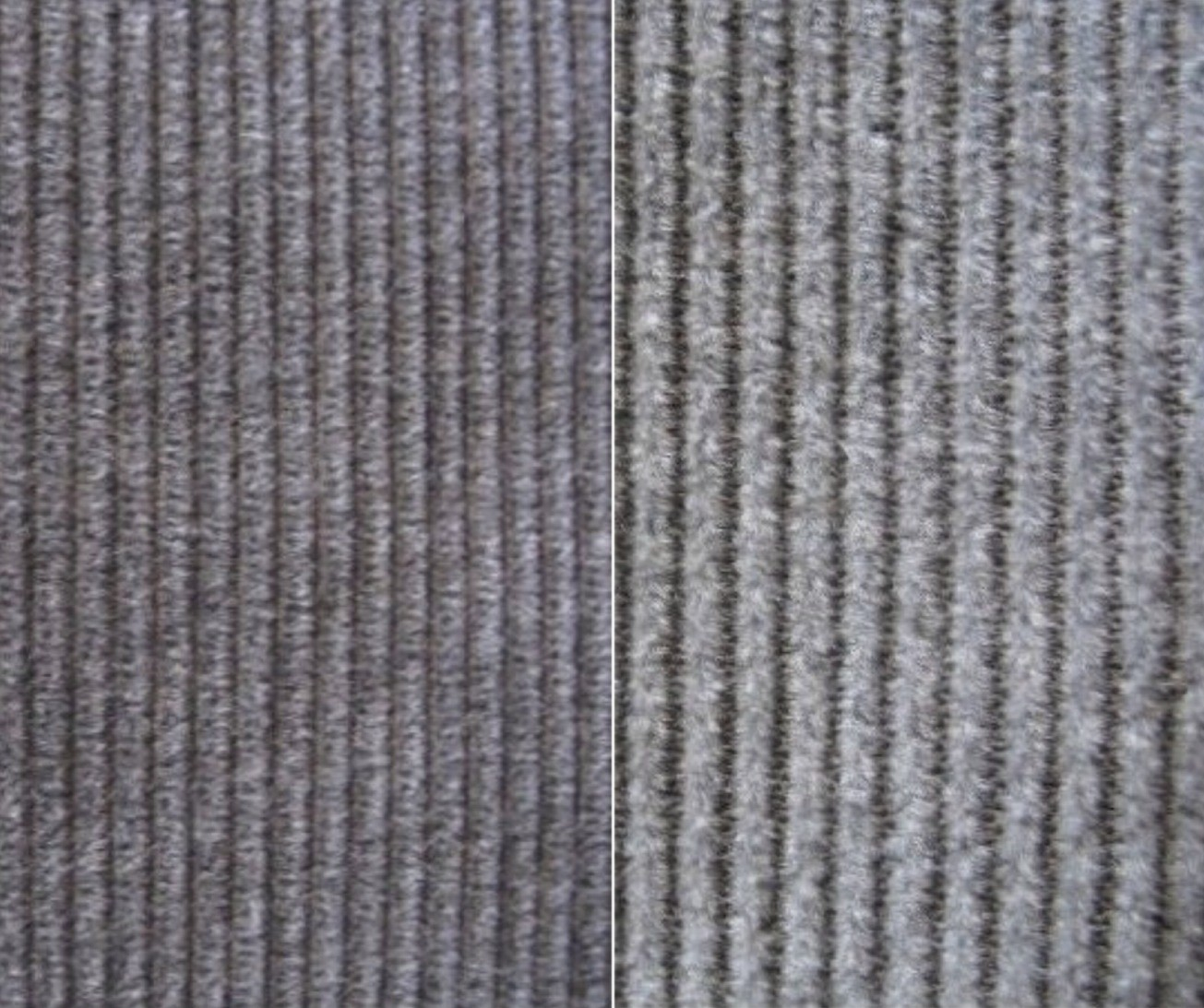
Cotton and woolen corduroy

Corduroy is a textile with a distinctively raised "cord" or wale texture. Modern corduroy is most commonly composed of tufted cords, sometimes exhibiting a channel (bare to the base fabric) between them. Both velvet and corduroy derive from fustian fabric. Corduroy looks as if it is made from multiple cords laid parallel to each other.

== Etymology ==
A common but possibly false etymology holds that the word "corduroy" derives from the French phrase corde du roi or cord of the king. The true etymology is not known.

== Variations ==
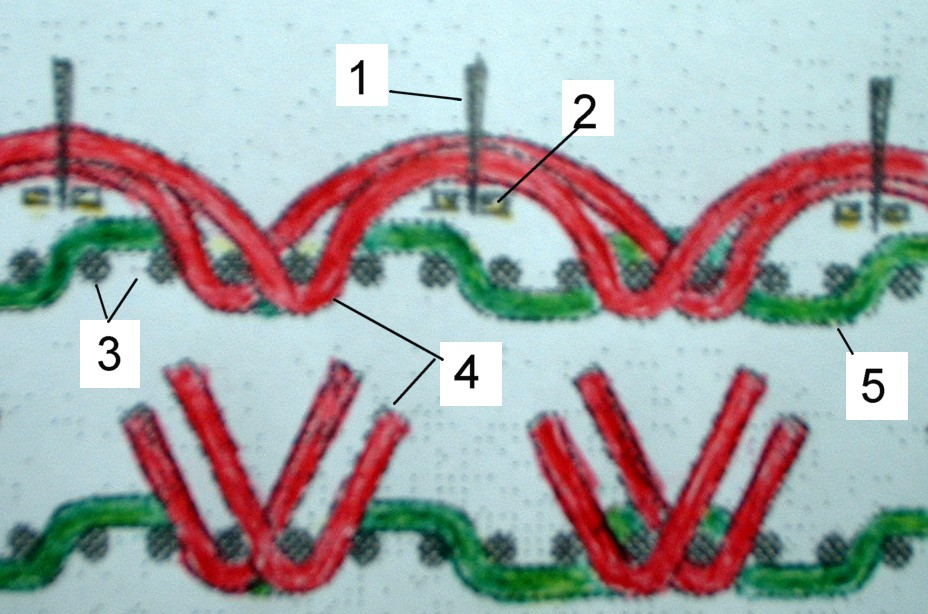
This modern diagram shows the warp (3) and the long (red-4) and short (green-5) weft threads; traditionally the knife (1) and the guide (2) are attached and the cutting motion is upwards.

Corduroy is made by weaving extra sets of fibre into the base fabric to form vertical ridges called wales. The wales are built so that clear lines can be seen when they are cut into pile.

Corduroy is considered a durable cloth and is found in the construction of trousers, jackets, and shirts. The width of the wales varies between fabric styles and is specified by wale count—the number of wales per inch. A wale is a column of loops running lengthwise, corresponding to the warp of woven fabric. The lower the number, the thicker the wales' width (e.g., 4-wale is much thicker than 11-wale). Wale count per inch can vary from 1.5 to 21, although the traditional standard is usually between 10 and 12. Wide wale is more commonly used in trousers, and furniture upholstery (primarily couches); medium, narrow, and fine wale fabrics are usually found in garments worn above the waist.

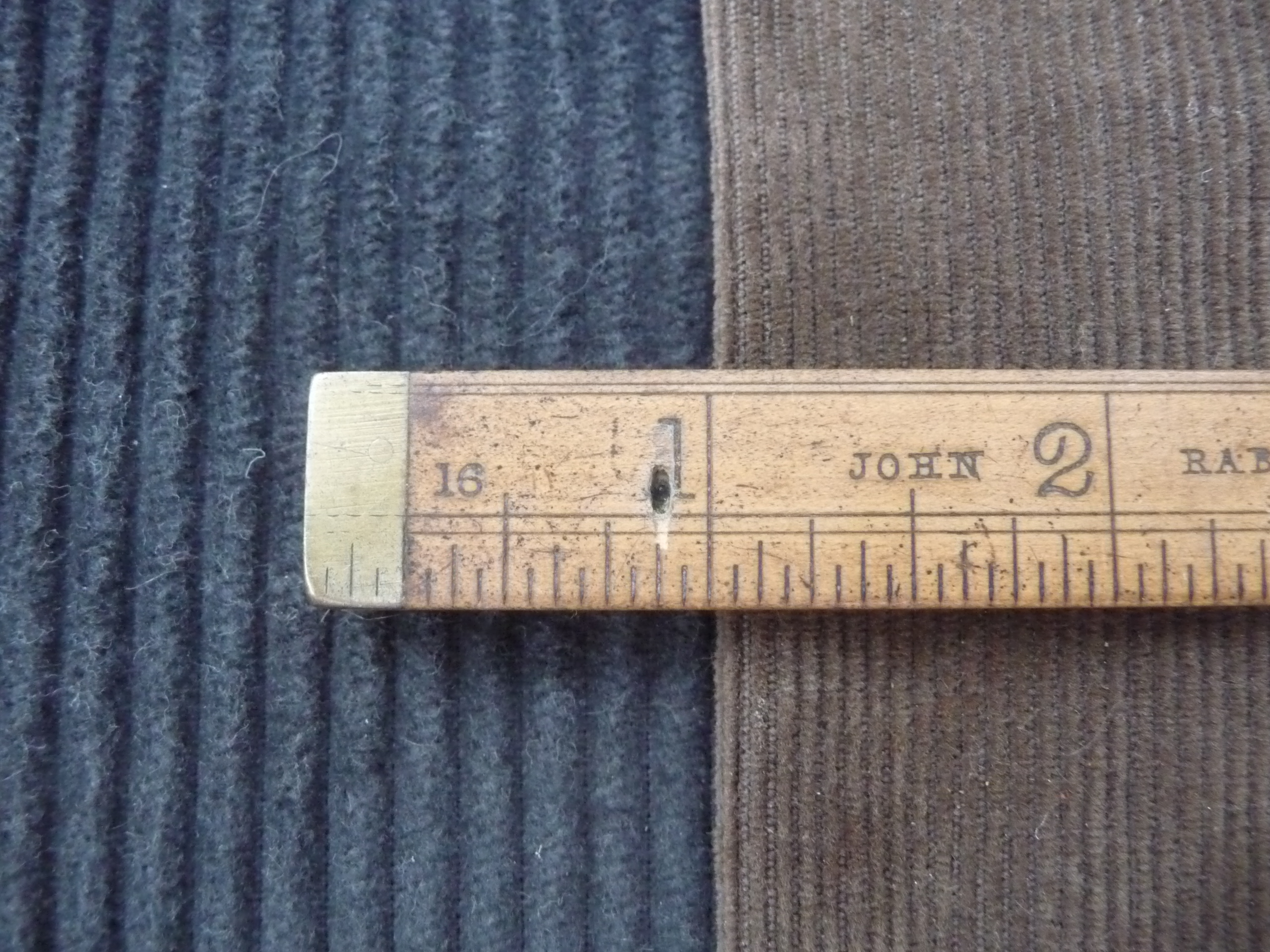
Graphite-coloured standard corduroy to the left showing approx 7 wales-per-inch, with brown needlecord at 16 wales to the inch

The primary types of corduroy are:

- Standard wale, at 11 wales/inch, available in many colours
- Pincord (also called pinwale or needlecord), the finest cord, with a count at the upper end of the spectrum (above 16)
- Pigment dyed/printed corduroy, where the fabric is coloured or printed with pigment dyes. The dye is applied to the surface; then, the garment is cut and sewn. When washed during the final manufacturing phase, the pigment dye washes out in an irregular way, creating a vintage look. Because of these subtle colour variations, no two garments of pigment-dyed corduroy are exactly alike, and their colour becomes softer with each washing.

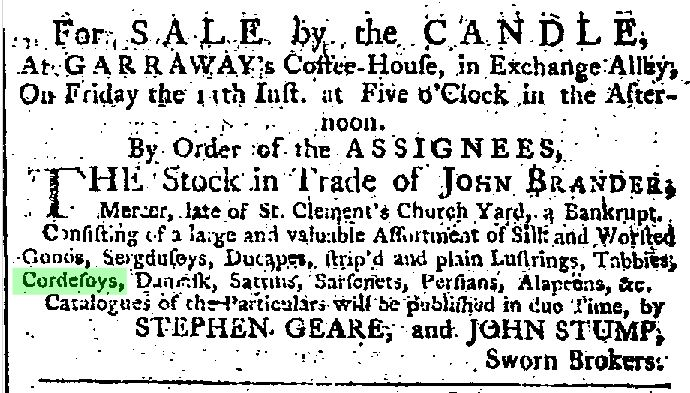
1756 advertisement mentioning "cordesoys"

Corduroy is traditionally used in making British country clothing, even though its origin lies in items worn by townspeople in industrial areas. Although it has existed for a long time and has been used in Europe since the 18th century, only in the 20th century did it become global, notably expanding in popularity during the 1970s.

== Other names ==
Other names are often used for corduroy. Alternative names include: corded velveteen, elephant cord (the thick-stripes version), pin cord, Manchester cloth and cords.

In Continental Europe, corduroy is known as "cord", "rib cord" or "rib velvet". In parts of Central and Northern European languages, it used to be simply known as "Manchester", which remains the current name for the fabric in Czech (manšestr) and Swedish (manchester). It should not be confused with the word's definition in Australian and New Zealand English, where it refers to bedding. In Portuguese, it is associated with a completely different type of fabric, bombazine, and is referred to as such (bombazina). In Greek it is known as κοτλέ (kotlé). In Persian, it is referred to as مخمل کبریتی (makhmal kebrity, "velvet matchstick") or just کبریتی (kebrity, "matchstick"), as the width of a cord resembles that of a matchstick. In French, its name is velours côtelé ("ribbed velvet").

== See also ==
- Bedford cord
- Corduroy road
- Corduroy, children's picture book by Don Freeman
- Corduroy, countryside book by Adrian Bell, published in 1930
