= Bombazine =

Twill fabric

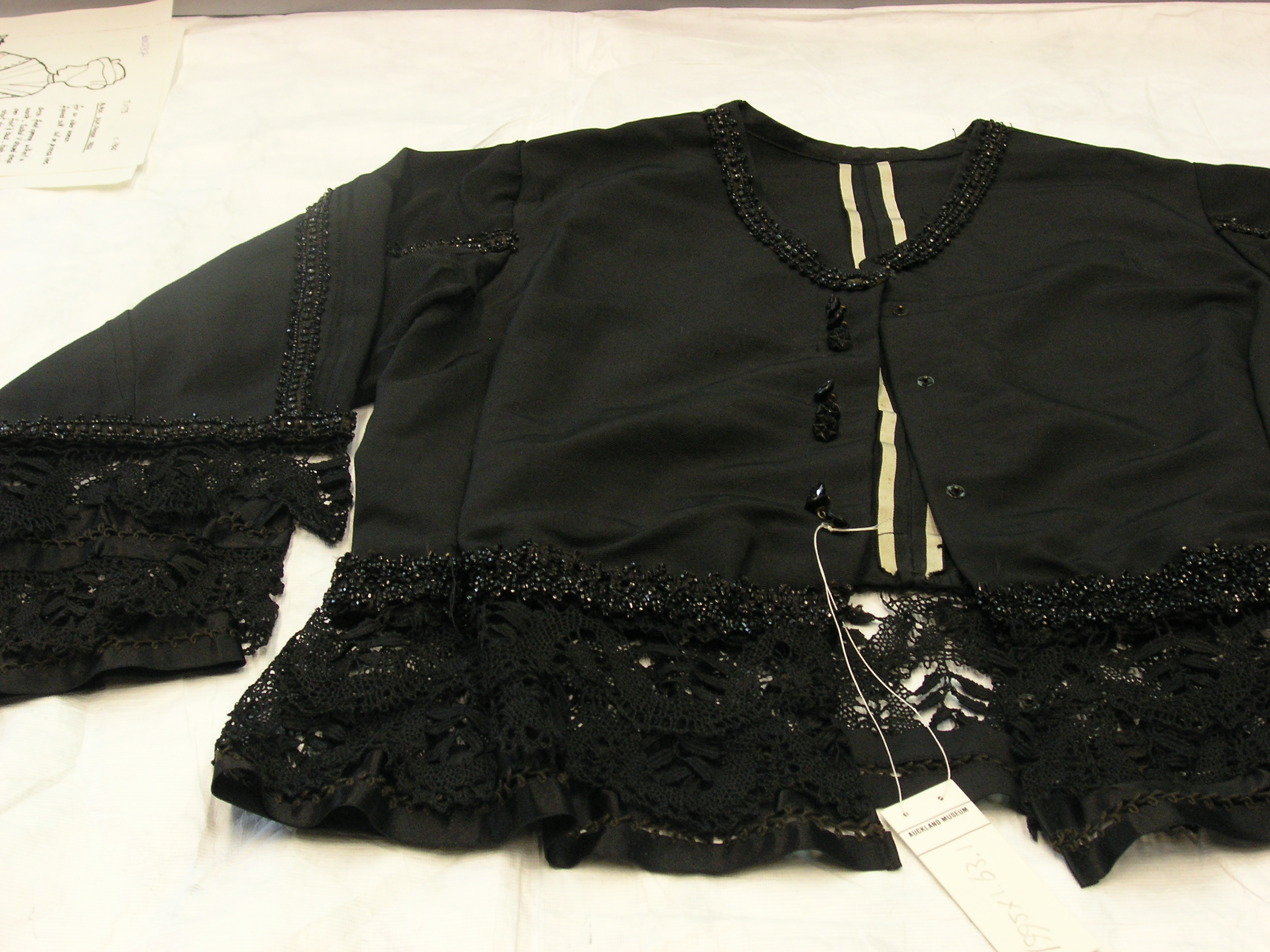
Black bombazine with lace edging and beading

Bombazine, or bombasine, is a fabric originally made of silk or silk and wool, and more recently also made of cotton and wool or of wool alone. Quality bombazine has a silk warp and a worsted weft. It is twilled or corded and used for dress-material: commonly in dresses, skirts, and jackets. It was a heavy and dense fabric, with a fine diagonal rib that ran through the weave of the fabric. Black bombazine was used largely for mourning wear in 16th-century and 17th-century Europe, but the material had gone out of fashion by the beginning of the 20th century.

Etymologists derive the English term "bombazine" from an Anatolian word in Greek: βόμβυξ ("silkworm"), via Latin bombyx ("silkworm") and the obsolete French term bombasin, applied originally to silk but afterwards to tree-silk or cotton. Bombazine is said to have been made in England in the time of Elizabeth I (r. 1558–1603), and early in the 19th century it was largely made at Norwich.
