= Cordings =

British clothing retailer

J.C. Cording & Co., Limited

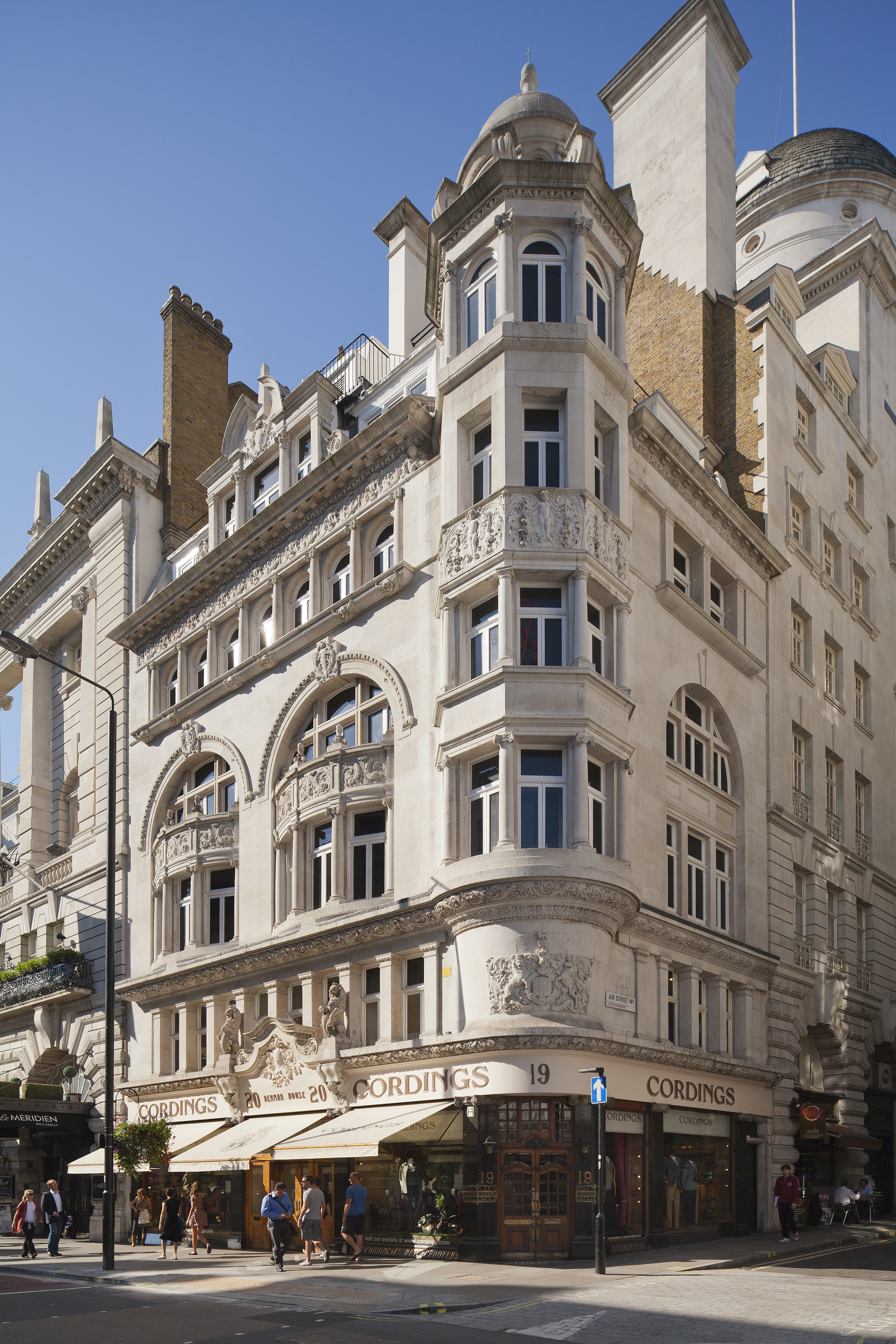
- Cordings store on Piccadilly in London
- Trade name: Cordings of Piccadilly
- Type: Private limited company
- Industry: Retail
- Founded: 1839; 187 years ago in London, England
- Founder: John Charles Cording
- Headquarters: 19 Piccadilly, London, England, UK
- Area served: Worldwide
- Key people: Eric Clapton (part owner)
- Products: Country clothing; Outerwear; Covert coats; Tattersall shirts; Mackintosh raincoats
- Website: cordings.co.uk

Cordings of Piccadilly is a British clothing retailer that was established in 1839. It is based at 19 Piccadilly in London, England.

== History ==
=== 19th century ===
Cordings was founded in 1839 by John Charles Cording, originally specialising in outdoor and waterproof garments. He opened the first shop at 231 The Strand, assisted by his sister Ellen and his mother Mary. In 1857, his cousin Henry Wilson joined the business and eventually inherited it.

In 1843, Charles Macintosh had developed a vulcanization process that bonded rubber with cotton to create a waterproof fabric. Cordings quickly adopted this material for its outerwear, reinforcing its reputation for weather-resistant clothing.

Due to changing traffic patterns in London, Cordings relocated to 19 Piccadilly in 1877. During this period, Cordings attracted notable patrons like the Duke of Connaught and Sir Henry Morton Stanley, who outfitted there in 1871 before his expedition to locate Dr. Livingstone.

=== 20th century ===
In 1902, Cordings was incorporated as J.C. Cording & Co Limited and expanded by acquiring additional premises at 24 Jermyn Street and 35 St James's Street, now known as Cording House.

A year later, in 1903, Denman House at 19–20 Piccadilly was designed by Harold Arthur Woodington and constructed using Portland stone, wood paneling, and brass fixtures. In the early 1900s, plans to widen Piccadilly threatened the building; instead of being demolished, its façade was relocated 10 yards back to its current position.

In 1909, Cordings was granted a Royal Warrant as waterproofers to the future King George V. In 1922, the then-young Prince of Wales selected Cordings as an outfitter. Later, it became known for producing Newmarket boots for the Queen Mother, the Duke of Windsor, and Mrs. Simpson.

During the 1920s, urban redevelopment resulted in the loss of the Regent Street frontage, and the Great Depression later led to the closure of the St James's shop. Cordings subsequently increased its product range to include British country wear, such as Mackintosh raincoats, covert coats, Tweed jackets, Corduroy and Moleskin trousers, and Tattersall shirts.

In 1971, Cordings was acquired by the owners of University Motors, an MG sports car dealership. Later, it expanded its Piccadilly premises in 1991 to include the adjacent property at 20 Piccadilly.

In 1998, Princess Anne, then-president of the British Clothing Export Council, visited the store. In 2000, Guy Ritchie wore jackets from Cordings in his film, Snatch.

=== 21st century ===
In December 2003, musician Eric Clapton acquired a partial stake in Cordings. Before Clapton's involvement, Cordings was primarily associated with country pursuits such as hunting, shooting, and fishing, and was struggling financially. Under new ownership, Cordings expanded its offerings to include a women's line, initiated by Clapton's wife, who sought suitable country wear. Cordings also launched an e-commerce platform to increase its accessibility beyond its London store.

In 2012, a fire at the Cordings store destroyed its entire Christmas stock.

In November 2015, Cordings opened its second store, in Harrogate, in a listed Victorian townhouse. However, in March 2021, the Harrogate location closed.

== Clothing ==
Cordings is credited with the creation of the covert coat and is recognised for adapting traditional checks from horse blankets for the design of Tattersall shirts, which are now commonplace in country attire.

Cordings is known for its great country clothing. Its clothing range includes caps, lambswool knits, waistcoats, city suits, and a variety of accessories. Its clothing range was acknowledged by the Duke of Wellington, who remarked that Cordings operated as a complete outfitter.
