= Tattersall (cloth) =

Cloth pattern

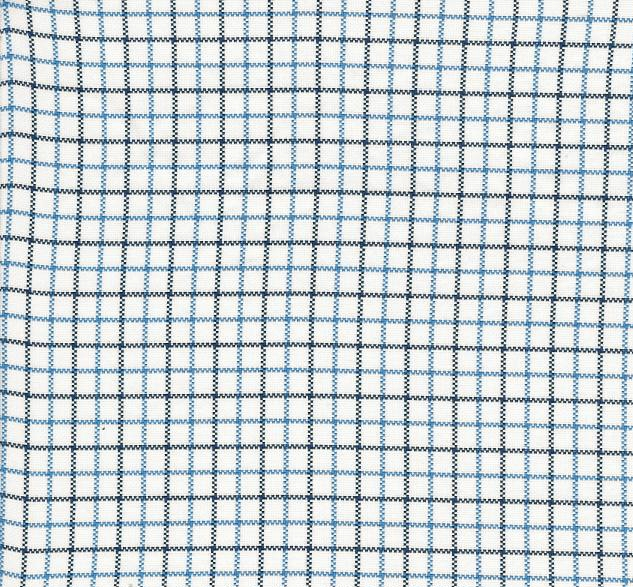
Blue and black checked tattersall cotton cloth.

Tattersall is a style of tartan pattern woven into cloth. The pattern is composed of regularly-spaced thin, even vertical warp stripes, repeated horizontally in the weft, thereby forming squares.

The stripes are usually in two alternating colours, generally darker on a light ground. The cloth pattern takes its name from Tattersall's horse market, which was started in London in 1766. During the 18th century at Tattersall's horse market blankets with this checked pattern were sold for use on horses.

Today tattersall is a common pattern, often woven in cotton, particularly in flannel, used for shirts or waistcoats. Tattersall shirts, along with gingham, are often worn in country attire, for example in combination with tweed suits and jackets. Traditional waistcoats of this cloth are often used by horse riders in formal riding attire, and adorned with a stock tie.

== See also ==
- British country clothing
- Gingham
