= Diplomatic School of Spain =

Coordinates: 40°26′46″N 3°43′25″W

Diplomatic School
- Escuela Diplomática
- Coat of Arms of the Diplomatic Service, also used by the Diplomatic School

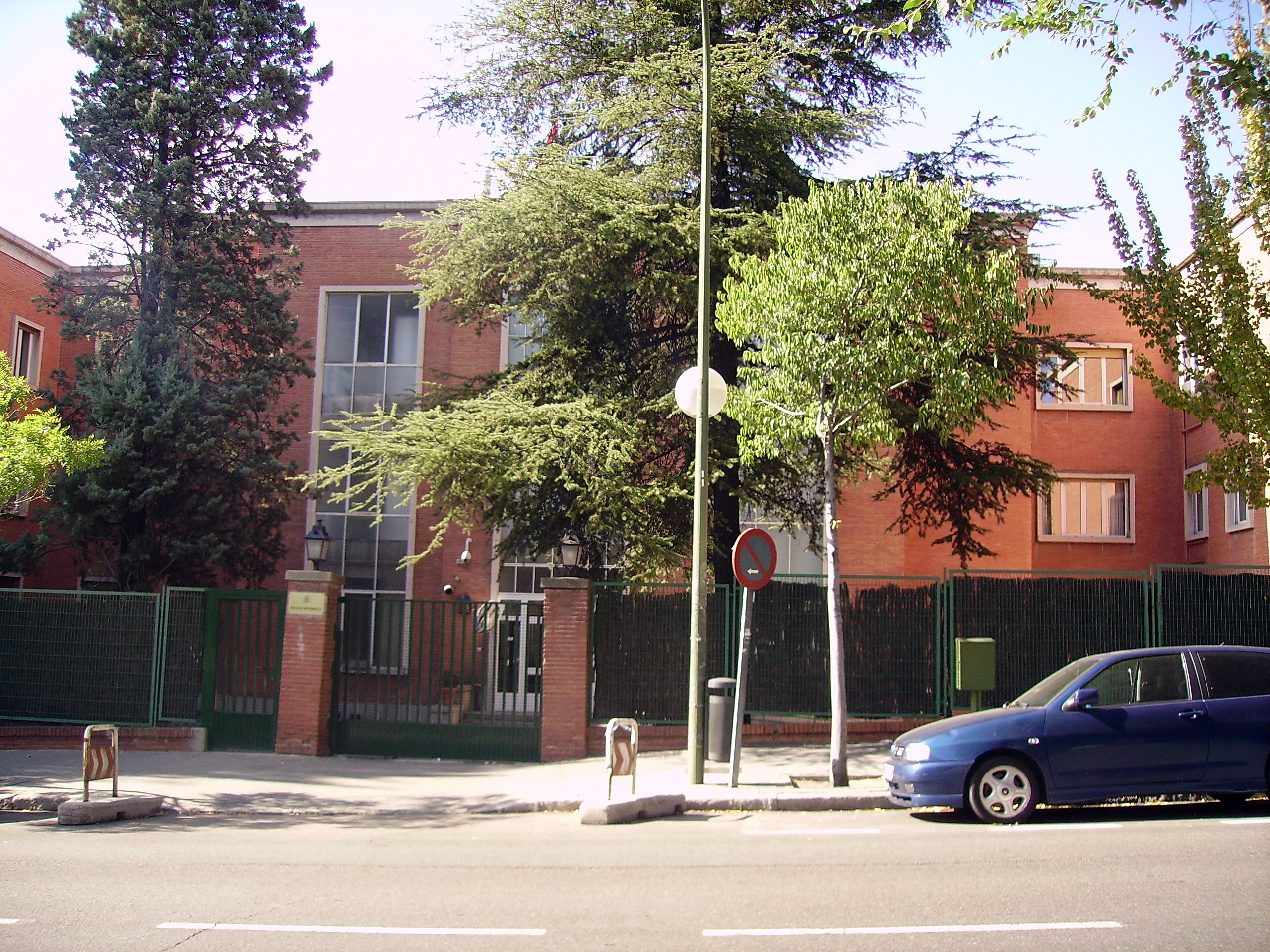
- Predecessor: Diplomatic Institute and Centre for Moroccan Studies (1911–1932)
- Formation: November 7, 1942; 83 years ago
- Founded at: Madrid
- Type: Educational institution
- Purpose: international civil service, diplomacy, international law, international relations
- Location: Paseo de Juan XXIII, 5, 28040 Madrid, Spain
- Ambassador-Director: Cecilia Robles Cartes
- Parent organization: Ministry of Foreign Affairs
- Website: exteriores.gob.es

The Diplomatic School (Spanish: Escuela Diplomática) is the official training institution of the Spanish Ministry of Foreign Affairs for career diplomats. It also provides training to other public officials working abroad and forming part of the Foreign Service.

This international training centre was established in late 1942 and is located in Madrid.

== History ==
Before the 20th century, diplomatic careers in Spain were limited and poorly trained. Most good diplomats became so because they belonged to prominent families who trained them for the profession, while most diplomatic posts were granted to politicians or intellectuals with no knowledge or interest in diplomacy.

In an attempt to solve this problem, in late 1911 The Marquess of Alhucemas, minister of state, granted the Royal Academy of Jurisprudence and Legislation funds to establish an Institute for the Teaching of Diplomatic and Consular Careers and a Centre for Moroccan Studies, whose purpose was the training of high-ranking officials to reactivate Spain's foreign policy and strengthen the new Spanish action in Morocco.

Years later, in 1928, the diplomatic career and the consular career were merged into a single one and the institute was renamed as "Diplomatic Institute and Centre for Moroccan Studies". However, during the Second Spanish Republic, the government wanted to establish a new method to choose diplomats and, in September 1932, the Under-Secretary of State informed the Royal Academy that the funds for the third quarter would be the last.

Since 1939, the aforementioned Royal Academy proposed to reestablish the institute and foreign minister Juan Luis Beigbeder entrusted this task to Manuel González-Hontoria. Finally, in October 1942 José Pan de Soraluce and José María Doussinague designed the new Diplomatic School, who was approved by minister Francisco Gómez-Jordana Sousa the following month.

== Organization ==
The Diplomatic School is governed by a Governing Board and the Director.

- The Governing Board is chaired by the director and it comprises the high-ranking officials of the School, representatives from several directorates-general of the Ministry of Foreign Affairs and from the Spanish Agency for International Development Cooperation (AECID) and the National Institute of Public Administration (INAP).
- The Director of the Diplomatic School, who has the rank and honours of ambassador. He or she is appointed by the Under-Secretary of Foreign Affairs, after participating in a public competition to fill the position.

=== Teaching departments ===
The Diplomatic School is organized in four departments:

- The Department for Diplomatic Studies, which provides the necessary training for candidates who have passed the corresponding entrance exams.
- The Department for Specialized Studies, which is responsible for organizing courses, seminars, and conferences to improve and specialize the training of diplomats and other officials involved in foreign policy.
- The Department for International Studies, that organizes the International Studies Course and any courses and research programs open to Spanish and foreign candidates who are PhD or Licentiate, whose content is international relations in the legal, historical-political, economic, cultural or linguistic fields and the presence of Spain in the world.
- The Department for Cultural Action, which aims to promote the work of the Diplomatic School, manage scholarships and the exchange program, and teach foreign languages. It also organizes cultural trips and visits.

== Master course ==
Its main mission is training new Spanish diplomats as civil servants. It also focuses on the training of officials serving abroad and those aspiring to a career in international civil service, among other functions. The Master's degree course in international relations is offered in collaboration with the mainstream Spanish universities, among them the Complutense University of Madrid. Previously the master's degree was titled Curso de Estudios Internacionales, or Course of International Studies, which brings together both Spanish and foreign students in the fields of diplomacy, and imparts a general education focused on international law and international relations.

Admission to the master's degree programme is based on a competitive exam which assesses the candidates knowledge of international relations. There is no fixed syllabus for this exam, rather the questions are based on international affairs at the date of the exam.

== Courses ==
The Diplomatic School of Spain offers the following courses, apart from the selective course for civil servants in diplomatic career:

- European Union course (Diploma in European Communities).
- Protocol course in collaboration with the University of Oviedo and the School of Public Administration of the Generalitat de Catalunya, or Government of Catalonia, directed by Felio A. Vilarrubias.
- Islam course.
- Human rights.

Each year, the Kings of Spain attend the commencement ceremony together with the Minister of Foreign Affairs.

== Directors ==
Directors of the Diplomatic School since 1942:

- Emilio de Palacios y Fau (1942–1946)
- José María Doussinague y Teixidor (1946–1949)
- Juan Francisco de Cárdenas y Rodríguez de Rivas (1950–1957)
- Cristóbal del Castillo y Campos (1957–1958)
- Emilio de Navasqüés y Ruiz de Velasco, Count of Navasqüés (1959–1972)
- Juan José Rovira y Sánchez-Herrero (1973–1974)
- Gonzalo Fernández de la Mora y Mon (1976)
- José Antonio Giménez-Arnau y Gran (1976–1979)
- José María Moro Martín-Montalvo (1979–1983)
- Juan Ignacio Tena Ybarra (1983–1985)
- Miguel Ángel Ochoa Brun (1985–1991)
- Ramón Armengod López (1991–1994)
- José Coderch Planas (1994–1996)
- Mariano Ucelay de Montero (1996–1999)
- José María Velo de Antelo (1999–2002)
- María Isabel Vicandi Plaza (2002–2003)
- Antonio Cosano Pérez (2003–2004)
- Andrés Collado González (2004–2007)
- Ignacio Sagaz Temprano (2007–2009)
- José Antonio Martínez from Villareal Baena (2009–2012)
- José Luis de la Peña Vela (2012–2015)
- Enrique Viguera Rubio (2015–2017)
- Ramón Gil-Casares (2017–2018)
- Fernando Fernández-Arias Minuesa (2018–2021)
- Alberto Antón Cortés (2021–2022)
- Santiago Miralles Huete (2022–2024)
- Cecilia Robles Cartes (2024–present)

== Student body ==
Among former students, the following personalities stand out:

Foreign Affairs and Cooperation

- Miguel Ángel Moratinos, Minister (2004-2010)
- Carlos Westendorp, Minister (1995-1996)
- Fernando Morán, Minister (1982-1985)
- Jonathan Delgado, Foreign Affairs Counselor and Consul General
- Dita Charanzová, Member of the European Parliament (2014 - )
- Mami Mizutori, United Nations Office for Disaster Risk Reduction (2016 - )

People's Party (Spain)

- Gustavo de Arístegui, deputy
- Jorge Moragas, deputy
- Vicente Blanco Gaspar, ambassador and writer

Literature

- Santiago de Mora-Figueroa y Williams, Marquess of Tamarón, writer, former ambassador of Spain in United Kingdom and former Director of the Cervantes Institute
- Fernando Schwartz, novelist
- José María Ridao, writer and journalist
- Father Apeles, or José-Apeles Santolaria de Puey y Cruells, lawyer and journalist
- Isabel Sartorius, aristocrat.

== Juristic interpreters ==
At its headquarters, the annual exams of Juristic Interpreters take place, by the Office of jurors, the Ministry of Foreign Affairs.

== Others ==
The Spanish Association of Professors of International Law and International Relations (Asociación Española de Profesores de Derecho Internacional y Relaciones Internacionales = AEPDIRI) and the Spanish Commission for Cooperation with UNESCO have their headquarters. There is also the Asociación de antiguos alumnos de la Escuela diplomática(in Spanish) (Association of former students of the Diplomatic School.)

== Bibliography ==
- Togores, Luis Eugenio; Jiménez, Juan Carlos (2018). La Escuela Diplomática, setenta y cinco años de servicio al estado: los últimos veinticinco años (1992-2017) [The Diplomatic School, seventy-five years of service to the state: the last twenty-five years (1992-2017)] (PDF) (in Spanish). Madrid: Ministry of Foreign Affairs. ISBN 978-84-95-265-82-1.
