= José Brunetti, 15th Duke of Arcos =

Spanish aristocrat and diplomat

The Most Excellent José Brunetti Duke of Arcos, Grandee of Spain
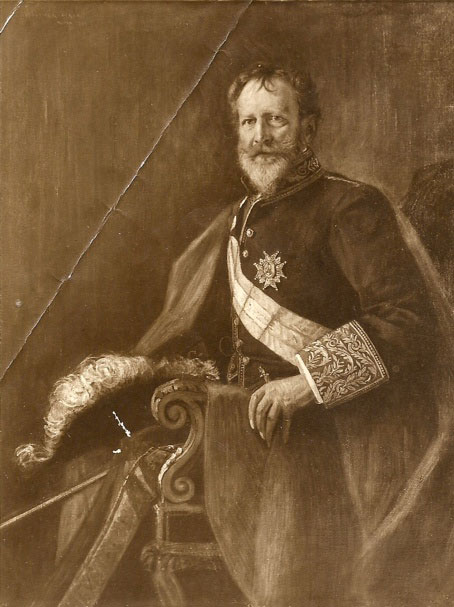
- The Duke of Arcos in the uniform of the Spanish Ambassador and the insignias of the Order of Charles III, c. 1900

Spanish Ambassador to Italy
- In office 1905–1907
- Preceded by: Antonio de Castro y Casaléiz
- Succeeded by: Juan Pérez-Caballero y Ferrer

Spanish Ambassador to Russia
- In office 1904–1905
- Preceded by: Juan Falcó, Prince Pio
- Succeeded by: Juan Jordán de Urríes, Marquis of Ayerbe

Spanish Minister to Belgium
- In office 1902–1904
- Preceded by: Wenceslao Ramírez de Villa-Urrutia
- Succeeded by: Juan Pérez-Caballero y Ferrer

Spanish Ambassador to the United States
- In office 1898–1902
- Preceded by: Luis Polo de Bernabé
- Succeeded by: Emilio de Ojeda y Perpignan

Personal details
- Born: Count José Ambrosio Brunetti y Gayeso; 6 February 1839 Pisa, Tuscany
- Died: 5 September 1928 (aged 89) San Sebastián, Spain
- Spouse: Virginia Woodbury Lowery (m. 1895; died 1928)
- Parent(s): Lázaro Brunetti; María Josefa Gayoso y Téllez-Girón

José Ambrosio Brunetti y Gayeso, 15th Duke of Arcos GE (6 February 1839 – 5 September 1928) was a Spanish aristocrat and diplomat who served as Minister Plenipotentiary in Bolivia, Uruguay, Chile, Mexico, the United States and Belgium, and ambassador to Italy and Russia. He was also an important benefactor of the Prado Museum, to which he made a posthumous bequest of ten paintings, including Young Man with a Feather Hat, by Pieter Hermansz Verelst.

== Early life ==
Brunetti was born on 6 February 1839 in Pisa, Tuscany. He was the son of María Josefa Gayoso y Téllez-Girón and Count Lázaro Brunetti (1781–1838), who was originally from Massa and who served Austrian ambassador in Madrid during most of the reign of King Ferdinand VII. In 1834, his father had been raised to the rank of count of the Austrian Empire by Emperor Francis I. (Note: From birth, he was known as Count as his father's Austrian title allowed all descendants through the male line to hold the title.) His mother was considered one of the "most admired and celebrated Camarasa sisters", daughters of the Marchionesses of Camarasa and granddaughters of the influential María Josefa Pimentel, Duchess of Osuna. Although his father was later assigned to the Court of Turin, his family remained in Madrid. José, the only boy, was the last of the five children of his parents and, a few months after his birth, lost his father after Count Brunetti died in Castelfranco, near Florence, in December 1839.

In 1847, his mother remarried to Fernando de Nieulant y Sanchez-Pleités, son of the Counts of Nieulant, later Marquesses of Sotomayor, and entered the service of the Spanish Royal family: appointed Lady-in-Waiting to the Queen Isabella II in charge of Infanta María del Pilar. The Marchioness of Sotomayor died in June 1866, shortly after the death of her first-born daughter, Sofía. Later, and through his maternal ancestry, José Brunetti was able to access the distribution of the numerous titles of his uncle, Mariano Téllez-Girón, 12th Duke of Osuna (and 14th Duke of Arcos), who died without issue in 1882, and managed to succeed him as Duke of Arcos in 1892. Likewise, his sisters Cristina, who married politician Fermín de Lasala, and Laura, respectively became Duchesses of Mandas and Monteagudo.

== Career ==
After graduating with degrees in Civil and Canon Law from the Complutense University of Madrid, he began a diplomatic career in 1862, following in his father's footsteps. In his youth he was attached to the Spanish legations in Austria (in 1864), Italy (from 1866 to 1869), Switzerland (from 1869 to 1876) and the United States (from 1877 to 1882). In 1882, he was promoted to Minister Plenipotentiary and assigned to direct the Spanish legation in Bolivia, followed by those in Uruguay (from 1890 to 1891), Chile (from 1891 to 1894) and Mexico (from 1894 to 1897). In 1899, he returned to Washington as Minister, and was the first Spanish representative in North America once diplomatic relations were resumed after the Treaty of Paris, which ended the Spanish-American War of 1898. He was formally received by President William McKinley on 3 June 1899 in the "Blue Parlor" of the White House. While in the United States, he lived at 1785 Massachusetts Avenue in Washington, D.C.

In 1902, he was transferred to Belgium, followed by Russia in 1904, both with the rank of Ambassador. His last posting was as Ambassador to Italy, which he held from 1905 until his resignation in 1907.

=== Titles and peerages ===
After the death of the childless 12th Duke of Osuna in 1882, his relatives divided up the many titles accumulated in the House of Osuna, which had been joined by those of Infantado, Benavente, Béjar and others among the Spanish nobility. Brunetti, nephew of the 12th Duke of Osuna, ran as heir to the historic duchy of Arcos, but other family members preceded him in formally requesting succession to the title before the Ministry of Grace and Justice: the Marquess of Castillo del Valle de Sidueña and the Marquess of Alventos, descendants of minor branches of the Ponce de León, the original lineage of the House of Arcos. Alventos managed to obtain a Royal Charter of Succession in the title in 1886, but it was immediately suspended due to the lawsuit that he had continued with Brunetti since 1884, and which was resolved in his favor by a ruling in January 1892. Thus, his notorious better right as great-grandson of the Duchess of Osuna, who was herself, in addition to Countess of Benavente, 12th Duchess of Arcos, prevailed over the distant genealogical connection of Alventos with the medieval Counts of Arcos.

After eight years of litigation, on 9 June 1892, Brunetti was officially invested with the title of Duke of Arcos and the Grandee of Spain. He never claimed, however, the rest of the dignities of the House of Arcos: the Marquessate of Zahara, traditionally held by the first-born sons of the Dukes, and the Counties of Casares (named for Casares, Málaga) and Bailén (Bailén, Andalusia), so these titles were dispersed among various descendants of the Duchess of Osuna.

== Personal life ==
When he arrived in Washington as Secretary of the Embassy in 1877, Brunetti met Virginia Woodbury "Ginny" Lowery (1855–1935), daughter of the wealthy businessman Archibald H. Lowery, and granddaughter on her maternal side of Levi Woodbury, who was Secretary of the Treasury, U.S. Senator, Governor of New Hampshire, and Justice of the Supreme Court. Her parents opposed her courtship with Count Brunetti, a young diplomat without fortune, and although they also disapproved of his main rival, a naval officer who would eventually become the famous Admiral George Dewey, they preferred him because he was American. Virginia, however, secretly became engaged to Brunetti, but did not want to marry against the opposition of her father. After leaving for successive destinations in Latin America, and after succeeding to the dukedom, in 1895, almost two decades later, her father withdrew his veto, and the couple married in October 1895 at the Lowerys' summer home in New London, Connecticut.

The Duke reportedly fought a duel with the Marquis of Aguada in France and "wounded his adversary three times, in the wrist and forearm."

=== Philanthropy ===
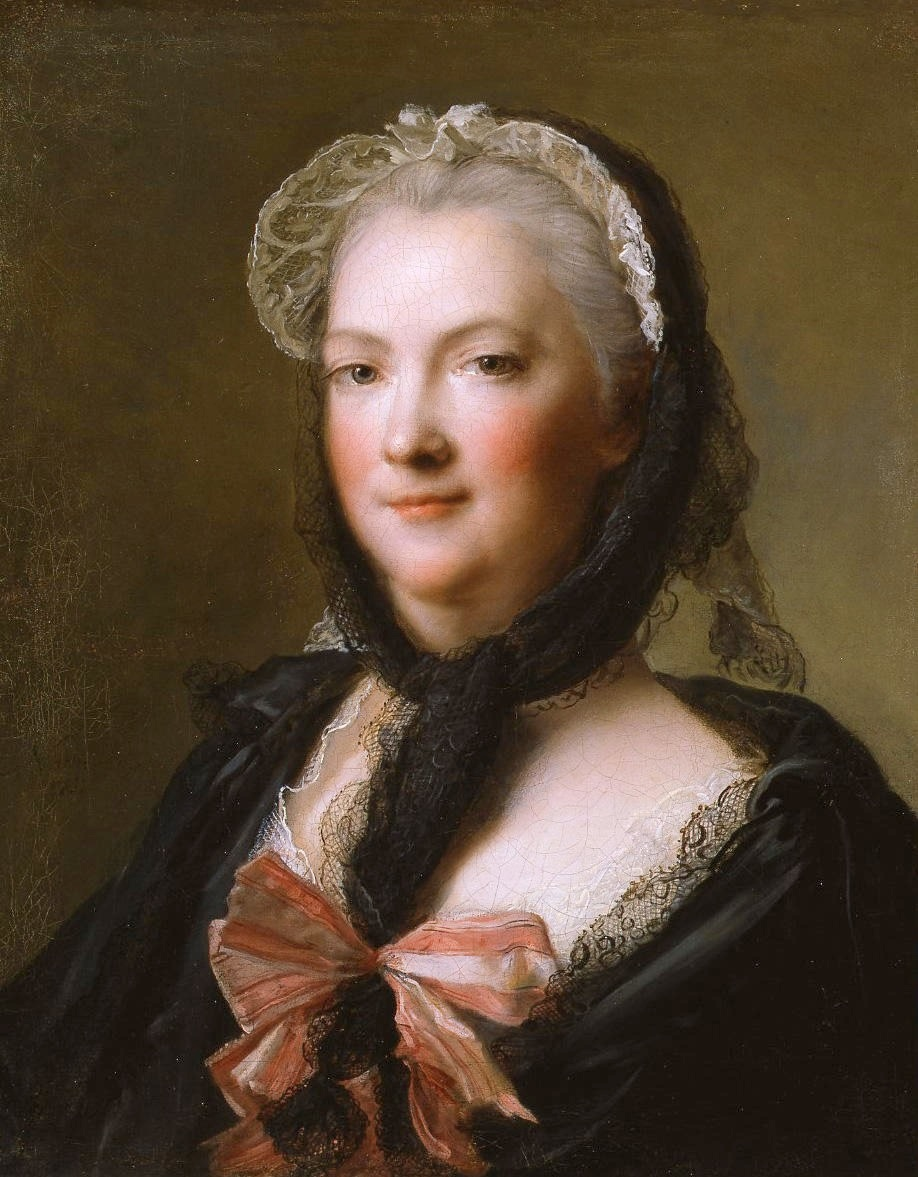
Portrait of Queen Marie Leszczyńska by Jean-Marc Nattier, 1753

In 1910, in honor of the Duchess' brother, Woodbury Lowery, the Duke and Duchess gave $20,000 to Harvard University "the income of which is to be used for research in history, preferably American history in the archives of foreign countries and more particularly in Spain." Upon her death, the Duchess left an additional $50,000 to Harvard to be added to the trust fund for the Woodbury Lowery fellowship.

Upon his death in 1928, the Duke made a bequest of ten paintings to the Prado Museum, including Young Man with a Feather Hat, by Pieter Hermansz Verelst (which was then attributed to Godfried Schalcken), a male portrait considered the work of Carlo Ceresa (then believed to be by Velázquez), and a portrait of Queen Marie Leszczyńska by Jean-Marc Nattier. As the Duke stipulated that his wife keep them in usufruct until his death, the donation did not become effective until the Duchess of Arcos died at Palazzo Brancaccio, her home in Rome, on 13 March 1935. The legacy was then officially accepted by the government of the Second Republic, and the works entered the Prado collections. The Duchess left a large collection of pictures, and fans, to the National Gallery in Washington and a number of pictures, including works by Henry Raeburn, Lebruns, and Greuzes (as well as Portrait of a Princess of France as Diana by Philippe Vignon), to the Prado.

== Family tree ==
Ancestors of José Brunetti, 15th Duke of Arcos

16. Giuseppe Ambrogio Brunetti
8. Lazzaro Brunetti
17. Giuditta Venturini
4. Count Giuseppe Ambrogio Brunetti
18. Michele Manetti
9. Angela Maria Manetti
19. Cinzia Maddalena Colombini
2. Count Lázaro Brunetti
5. Colomba Salvioni
1. José Brunetti, 15th Duke of Arcos
24. Fernando Gayoso, 7th Count of Amarante
12. Domingo Gayoso de los Cobos, 11th Marquess of Camarasa
25. María Josefa de los Cobos, 3rd Marchioness de la Puebla de Parga
6. Joaquín Gayoso de los Cobos, 12th Marquess of Camarasa
26. Diego Luis Bermúdez de Castro Fajardo y Andrade
13. Ana Gertrudis Bermúdez de Castro y Taboada
27. María Ignacia Taboada Mariño y Proaño
3. María Josefa Gayoso y Téllez-Girón
28. Pedro Téllez-Girón, 8th Duke of Osuna
14. Pedro Téllez-Girón, 9th Duke of Osuna
29. María Vicenta Pacheco Téllez-Girón
7. Josefa Téllez-Girón, 2nd Marchioness of Marguini
30. Francisco Alfonso Pimentel, 14th Count of Benavente
15. María Josefa Pimentel, 15th Countess of Benavente
31. María Faustina Téllez-Girón y Guzmán

== See also ==
- List of dukes in the peerage of Spain

Spanish nobility
Preceded by Mariano Téllez-Girón	Duke of Arcos; 1892–1928	Succeeded by Ángela Téllez-Girón
