= List of ambassadors of Spain to South Africa =

Ambassador of Spain to South Africa
- Coat of arms of Spain
- Incumbent; José Manuel Pascual García since 16 April 2025
- Ministry of Foreign Affairs; Secretariat of State for Foreign Affairs
- Style: The Most Excellent
- Residence: Pretoria
- Nominator: The Foreign Minister
- Appointer: The Monarch
- Term length: At the government's pleasure
- Inaugural holder: Luis García de Llera y Rodríguez
- Formation: 1960
- Website: Mission of Spain to Africa

The ambassador of Spain to South Africa is the official representative of the Kingdom of Spain to the Republic of South Africa. It is also accredited to the Union of Comoros, the Kingdom of Lesotho, the Republic of Madagascar and the Republic of Mauritius.

South Africa and Spain established diplomatic relations in 1951. In 1960, the permanent representation in Pretoria was elevated to the rank of embassy.

== Jurisdiction ==
Blue: Embassy in Pretoria Green: Consulate G. in Cape Town

- South Africa: The ambassador is responsible for South Africa–Spain relations. The Embassy's Consular Section provides consular protection to Pretoria, the Northeast part of the country and Lesotho, while the Consulate General in Cape Town offers consular services to the West and South parts of the country, as well as the republics of Comoros, Madagascar and Mauritius. In addition, an honorary consul resides in Durban and an honorary vice-consul in Gqeberha.

The ambassador is also accredited to:

- Comoros: Diplomatic relations were established on 1 March 1983. Spain has an honorary vice-consul in Moroni.
- Lesotho: Since 3 May 1976 both countries maintain diplomatic relations. Spain has an honorary consulate with residence in Maseru.
- Madagascar: On 25 March 1966, both nations established diplomatic relations. Spain has an honorary consulate in Antananarivo.
- Mauritius: Diplomatic relations were established on 30 May 1979. An honorary consul resides at Port Louis.

In the past, this ambassador was also accredited to Malawi (1971–1977).

== List of ambassadors ==
| Name | | Term | Nominated by | Appointed by | Accredited to |
|---|---|---|---|---|---|
Envoy Extraordinary and Minister Plenipotentiary
| - | Miguel Espinos y Bosch | 18 June 1951 – 23 December 1952 (1 year, 178 days) | Alberto Martín-Artajo | Francisco Franco | Ernest George Jansen |
| - | Mariano Amoedo y Galarmendi | 23 December 1952 – 22 May 1955 (2 years, 150 days) | Alberto Martín-Artajo | Francisco Franco | Ernest George Jansen |
| - | Juan Gómez de Molina y Elío; Marquess of Fontana | 10 July 1955 – 26 May 1957 (Note: This date is an estimate. There is no formal dismissal date, but the Marquess of Fontana was born on 26 May 1887, so it is very likely that he retired upon reaching the age of 70 (usual retirement date in the diplomatic service). He died on 27 June 1966.) (retired) (1 year, 320 days) | Alberto Martín-Artajo | Francisco Franco | Ernest George Jansen |
| - | Miguel de Aldasoro y Villamazares | 4 January 1958 – 12 May 1960 (retired) (2 years, 129 days) | Fernando María Castiella | Francisco Franco | Ernest George Jansen |
Ambassador Extraordinary and Plenipotentiary
| 1 | Luis García de Llera y Rodríguez | 17 October 1960 – 29 July 1964 (3 years, 286 days) | Fernando María Castiella | Francisco Franco | C. R. Swart |
| 2 | Rafael Morales Hernández | 29 December 1964 – 30 August 1971 (retired) (6 years, 244 days) | Fernando María Castiella | Francisco Franco | C. R. Swart |
| 3 | Eduardo Gasset y Díez de Ulzurrun (Note: Accredited to Malawi.); Count of Peñarrubias | 21 September 1971 – 10 November 1973 (2 years, 50 days) | Gregorio López-Bravo | Francisco Franco | Jim Fouché |
| 4 | Juan Ramón Parellada Soteras | 3 January 1974 – 2 April 1977 (3 years, 89 days) | Laureano López Rodó | Francisco Franco | Jim Fouché |
| 5 | Emilio Beladíez Navarro; Marquess of the Conquista Real | 2 April 1977 – 29 July 1981 (4 years, 27 days) | The Marquess of Oreja | Juan Carlos I | Nico Diederichs |
| 6 | José Pérez del Arco Rodríguez | 29 July 1981 – 24 October 1983 (2 years, 87 days) | José Pedro Pérez-Llorca | Juan Carlos I | Marais Viljoen |
| 7 | Federico Garayalde Emparan | 24 October 1983 – 6 February 1988 (4 years, 105 days) | Fernando Morán | Juan Carlos I | Marais Viljoen |
| 8 | Álvaro de Castilla y Bermúdez-Cañete | 14 May 1988 – 30 November 1991 (3 years, 200 days) | Francisco Fernández Ordóñez | Juan Carlos I | P. W. Botha |
| 9 | Mariano Ucelay de Montero (Note: Accredited to Lesotho and Madagascar.) | 2 December 1991 – 2 September 1996 (4 years, 275 days) | Francisco Fernández Ordóñez | Juan Carlos I | F. W. de Klerk |
| 10 | Miguel Ángel Carriedo Mompín (Note: Accredited to Comoros, Lesotho, Madagascar and Mauritius.) | 2 September 1996 – 24 February 2001 (4 years, 175 days) | Abel Matutes | Juan Carlos I | Nelson Mandela |
| 11 | Miguel Ángel Fernández de Mazarambroz y Bernabeu | 24 February 2001 – 1 August 2005 (4 years, 158 days) | Josep Piqué | Juan Carlos I | Thabo Mbeki |
| 12 | Ramón Gil-Casares | 1 August 2005 – 30 August 2008 (3 years, 29 days) | Miguel Ángel Moratinos | Juan Carlos I | Thabo Mbeki |
| 13 | Pablo Benavides | 30 August 2008 – 26 May 2012 (3 years, 270 days) | Miguel Ángel Moratinos | Juan Carlos I | Thabo Mbeki |
| 14 | Juan Ignacio Sell | 16 June 2012 – 24 June 2017 (5 years, 8 days) | José Manuel García-Margallo | Juan Carlos I | Jacob Zuma |
| 15 | Carlos Enrique Fernández-Arias Minuesa | 24 June 2017 – 12 January 2022 (4 years, 202 days) | Alfonso Dastis | Felipe VI | Jacob Zuma |
| 16 | Raimundo Robredo Rubio | 12 January 2022 – 16 April 2025 (3 years, 94 days) | José Manuel Albares | Felipe VI | Cyril Ramaphosa |
| 17 | José Manuel Pascual | 16 April 2025 – present (1 year, 144 days) | José Manuel Albares | Felipe VI | Cyril Ramaphosa |

== See also ==
- South Africa–Spain relations
