= Montería (hunt) =

Ancient endemic

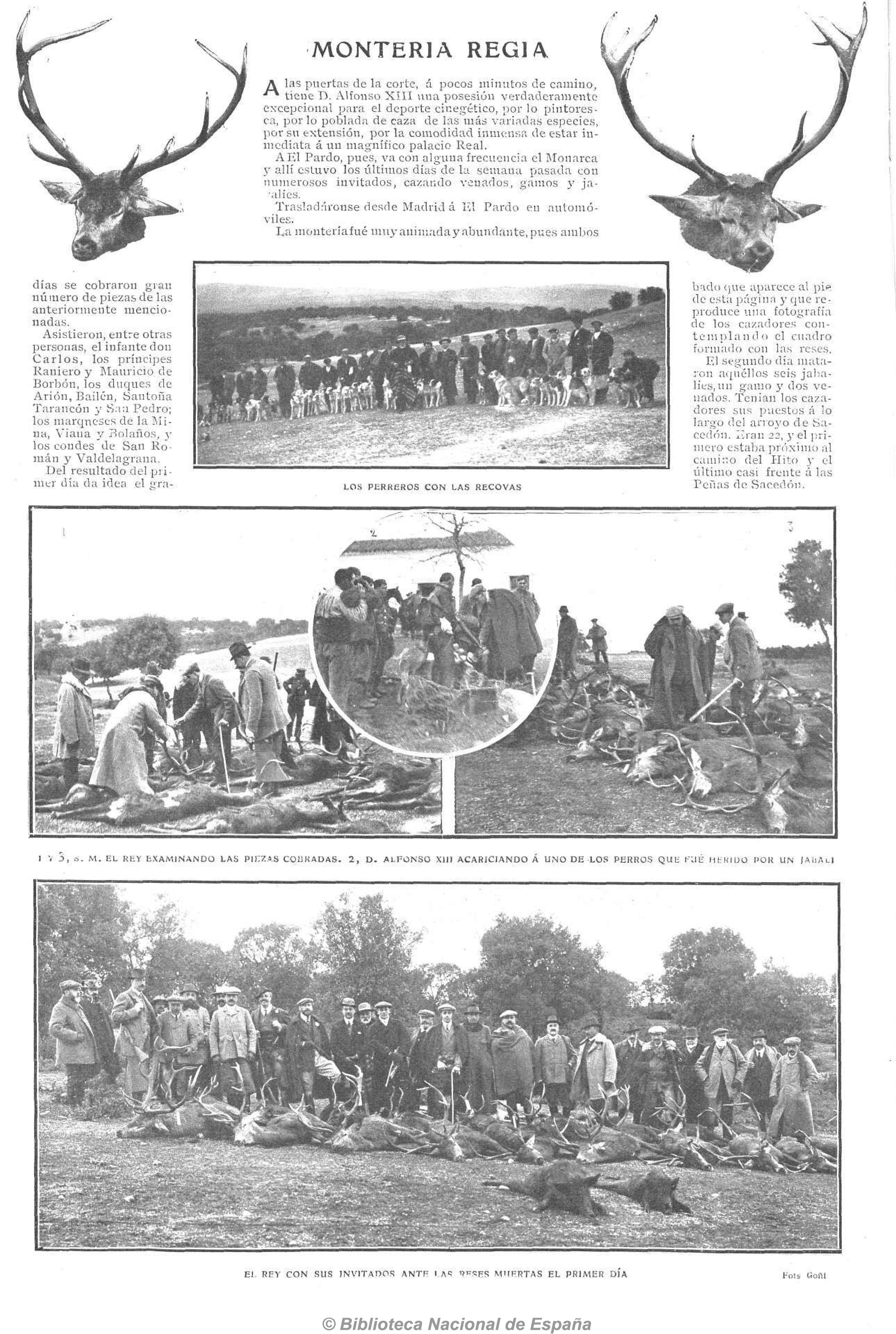
A 1909 news item showing a montería organised in El Pardo by Alfonso XIII

A montería (Spanish: [monteˈɾi.a]) is an ancient type of driven hunt endemic to Spain. It involves the tracking, chase and killing of big-game, typically red deer, wild boar, fallow deer and mouflon. A number of "rehalas" (packs of hounds) along with their respective "rehaleros" (unarmed beaters) will stir up an area of forest with the aim of forcing the game to move around and into the shooting pegs, where hunters will be able to fire.

Although big-game driven hunts with dogs have existed in Spain since antiquity, the earliest records of monterías date back to the Late Middle Ages in the Crown of Castile, as can be seen with king Alfonso XI and his "Libro de la montería", published in the first half of the 14th century. Modern monterías in the Spanish sense are the result of around 300 years of evolution from the most primitive hunts that were common in the Middle Ages.

As of today, two types of monterías exist; namely the "montería española" or "a la española", practised throughout the southern half of Spain and Portugal and the "montería norteña", typical of the northern half of Spain. While the latter is very similar to the rest of driven hunts occurring elsewhere in Europe, the former is culturally unique. Albeit, when monterías are brought up in the foreign context, it is almost always in reference to the former. Historians refer to the period 1915–1931 in rural Spain as the "época de oro de la montería española" (golden age of the Spanish montería).

The season for monterías depends on the autonomous communities of Spain, as each of them establish their own calendars every year, but it is almost unexceptionally the same from one to the other. They are celebrated from mid-October until mid-February or in some cases the last weekend of said month.

The sport is controversial, particularly in Spain. Advocates of monterías view it as an intrinsic part of rural economies, as well as necessary for conservation and population controls, whereas opponents argue on the grounds of animal cruelty and lack of necessity (the collected meat is nonetheless taken advantage of fully, and provides a sustainable and natural free range food source). In 2016, a study by Deloitte estimated that hunting in Spain generated about €6.5 billion of Spain's GDP, amounting to 0.3% of the country's economy and 187,000 jobs, monterías being a significant part of this.

== History ==
The first exhaustive works on hunting date back to the Late Middle Ages, when different royal houses and European nobles of Castile, Portugal, France, Germany etc. were commissioned the drafting of Hunting Treaties, the favourite activity of the ruling classes at that time, of which there are still a few in existence:

- "Libro de la montería" by Alfonso XI (14th century)

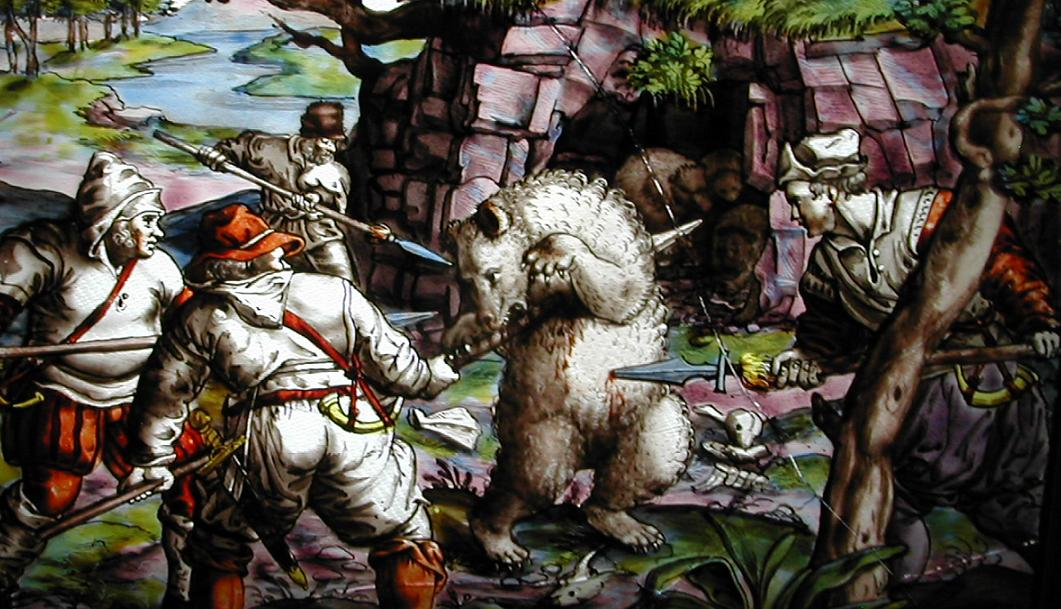
A bear-hunting scene from the "Libro de la montería" of Alfonso XI

- "Tratado de la montería" by an unknown hunter from Sierra de Segura (15th century)
- "Le livre de chasse du roy Modus" (15th century) by Gaston III, Count of Foix (14th century)
- "Livro da Montaria" of the King John I of Portugal (14th century)

During the Middle Ages, different types of hunting were known in the Iberian Peninsula. Two very peculiar types were net hunting and vulture hunting, carried out mainly in the northwest of the Iberian Peninsula to hunt wolf.

However, the most common form of hunting throughout Spain and Portugal was that in which, prior to the actual hunt, the prey bedding place was sought by following the trail of the chosen animal with the help of a hound, to, once the location of the bed was known, place Alanos and sighthounds in strategic places of passage of said animal in order to catch it. To launch the animal towards the hunting pegs, the bed was approached with hounds and chased by hunters on foot and on horseback to try and catch the game.

During the Middle Ages in Spain, this type of hunting was carried out mainly for hunting Cantabrian brown bears and wild boars, whereas in France it was more common with red deer.

From the Renaissance and especially since the widespread of firearms in the 16th and 17th centuries, medieval hunting evolved according to each territory and country, in modalities that today differ greatly from each other, such as hunting in the north of Spain (montería norteña or batida), the French "venerie" (on foot) and the "grande venerie" (on horseback), fox hunting in the United Kingdom or montería española or "a la española" in southern Spain and Portugal.

== Montería española ==
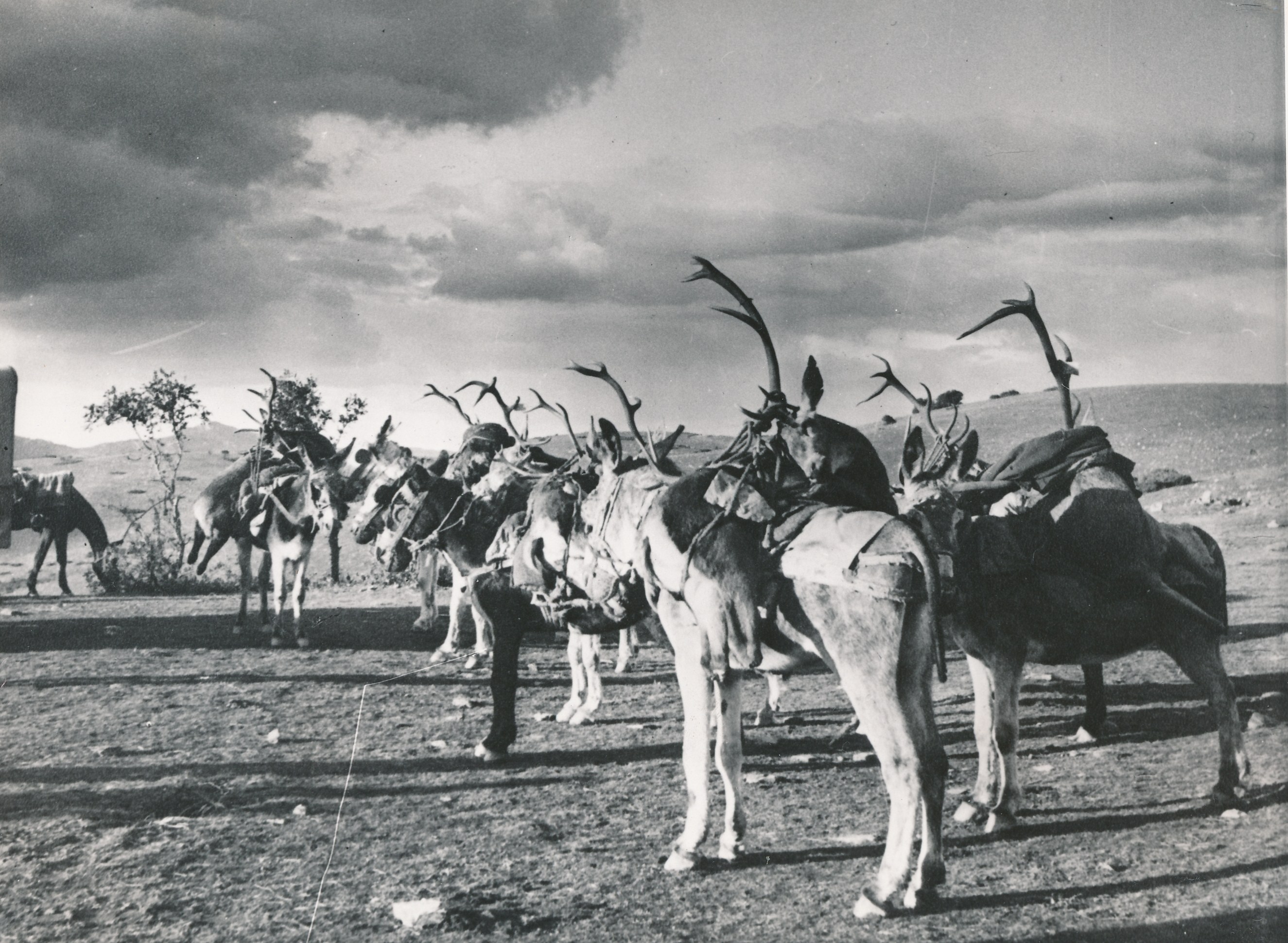
Hunted deers mounted on mules prior to being transported to the gathering at a montería in Andújar, 1958

This type of hunt, much larger in extent, is carried out mainly in the centre and south of the Iberian Peninsula, including the entirety of Portugal, where it has been adopted more recently. Its existence is the result of an evolution that dates back to the 18th century. Prior to the appearance of modern "Spanish monterías", hunting in southern Spain and Portugal and was very similar to the "montería norteña", the one that is still carried out in the northern half of Spain. This was apparent in the book "Tratado de la montería" published by the Duke of Almazán on a 15th-century work by an Andalusian hunter from the Sierra de Segura. It is the most effective approach to harvesting big-game animals. In 1984, more than 35,000 stags had been taken that season in monterías, that number being likely much higher today.

Wild boars and Iberian red deer are the most common species to be hunted in this type of montería, but also other species such as fallow deer, mouflon and formerly wolf and lynx. In a forest or patch of several hundred hectares a series of so-called "armadas" or lines of positions with shooting pegs, are arranged to surround and cover the mancha. Depending on their particular location in it, the armadas are called by various names ("cuerda" is the highest; "sopié" the lowest; "traviesa" is the one that crosses or is generally found in the middle of the area). From a certain end, or from more than one, the rehalas are released, and led by their respective beaters. They will beat the area in different directions with the ultimate aim of moving the game towards the hunting pegs.

Each rehala has between 10 and 20 dogs and is led by a "rehalero", "perrero" or "podenquero". The base of most of the rehalas dedicated to "southern-style hunting" consist of hound-type dogs (podenco andaluz), although those that are somewhat more specialised in wild boar use preferably mongrels of Spanish Mastiff, catch dogs, podenco or griffon.

A traditional rehala dedicated to hunting deer and wild boar, is normally made up of a majority of pure podencos, a minority of hounds and mastiff mongrels and a pure mastiff or catching dog collars (often alano or dogo).

This type of hunting consists of the use of a very high number of dogs that, led by their drivers, beat the ground to hunt in order to direct all kinds of animals towards the hunters (generally deer, wild boar, fallow deer and mouflon).

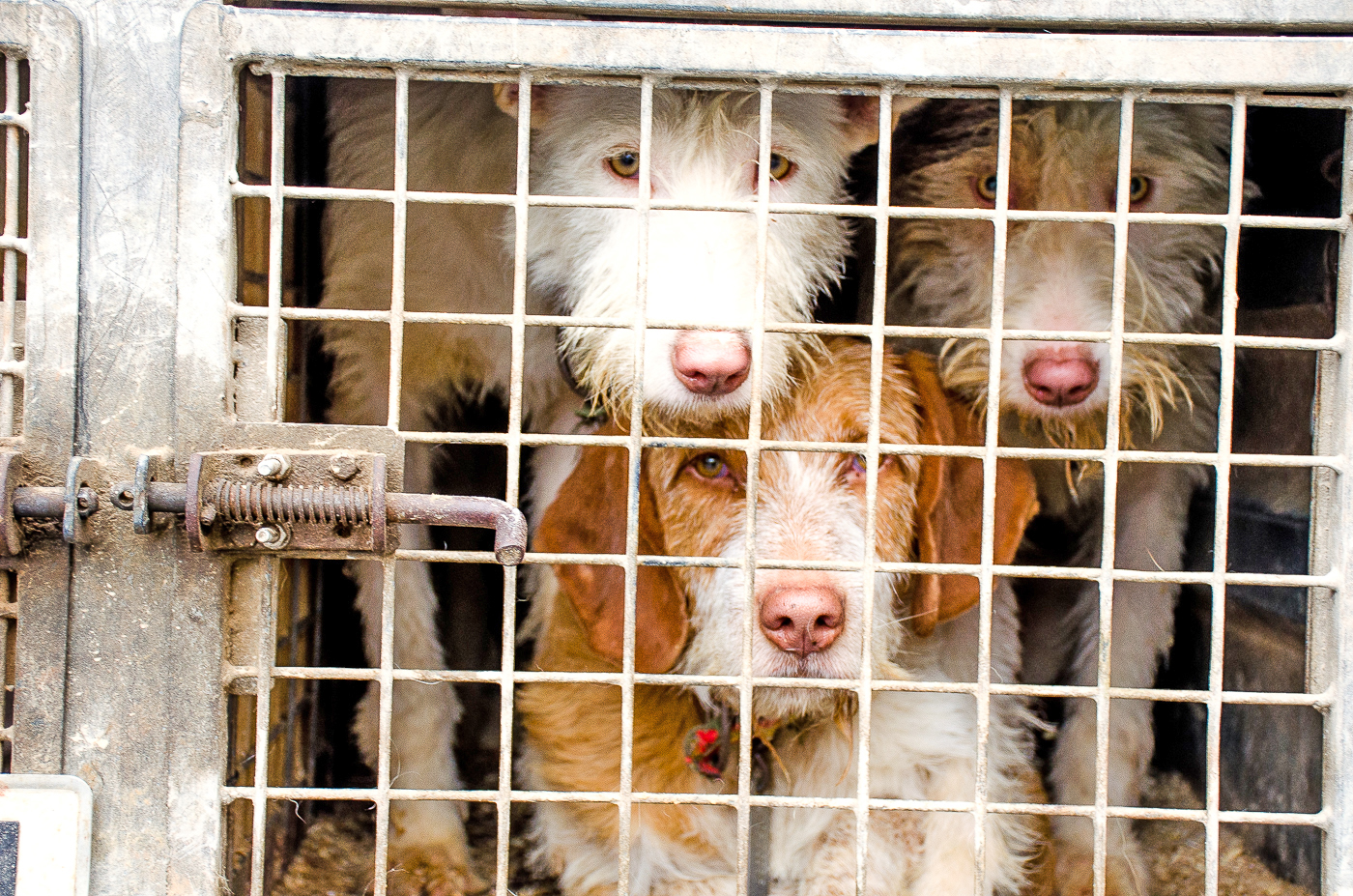
Rehala hounds awaiting the start of a montería in Villadiego

The dogs used in this type of hunting are generally not suitable for hunting in the traditional European manner.

It is not a selective modality, except for the instructions that can be given at the beginning of the hunt on the type of animals on which it is possible to shoot or not, and the selection made by the hunter at the time of shooting, knowing that in doing so he reveals his position more. For this reason, the most experienced hunters will avoid shooting on animals of little hunting value while waiting for what they consider worthwhile.

Species that are currently shot in monterías españolas include:

- Wild boar (usually)
- Stag (usually)
- Fallow deer (usually)
- Mouflon (usually)
- Red fox (occasionally)
- Roe deer (rarely)

Iberian wolves were shot in Spanish monterías until 1992, when the European Union Court declared it a "protected species south of the Douro river". Iberian lynxes were also regularly hunted until they became almost extinct and were protected in 1970 in the entirety of the Iberian Peninsula.

If not by invitation, the price per peg of a commercial Spanish montería is anywhere between €250 and €6,000.

=== Procedure ===
A montería usually begins anywhere between 8 and 10 in the morning. With the first light of the day, the huntsmen begin to arrive at the finca or grounds where the hunt will take place. There, a traditional breakfast of migas (a dish made from fried breadcrumbs and typically accompanied with a fried egg, green peppers, garlic and either chorizo, torreznos or both) is usually served.

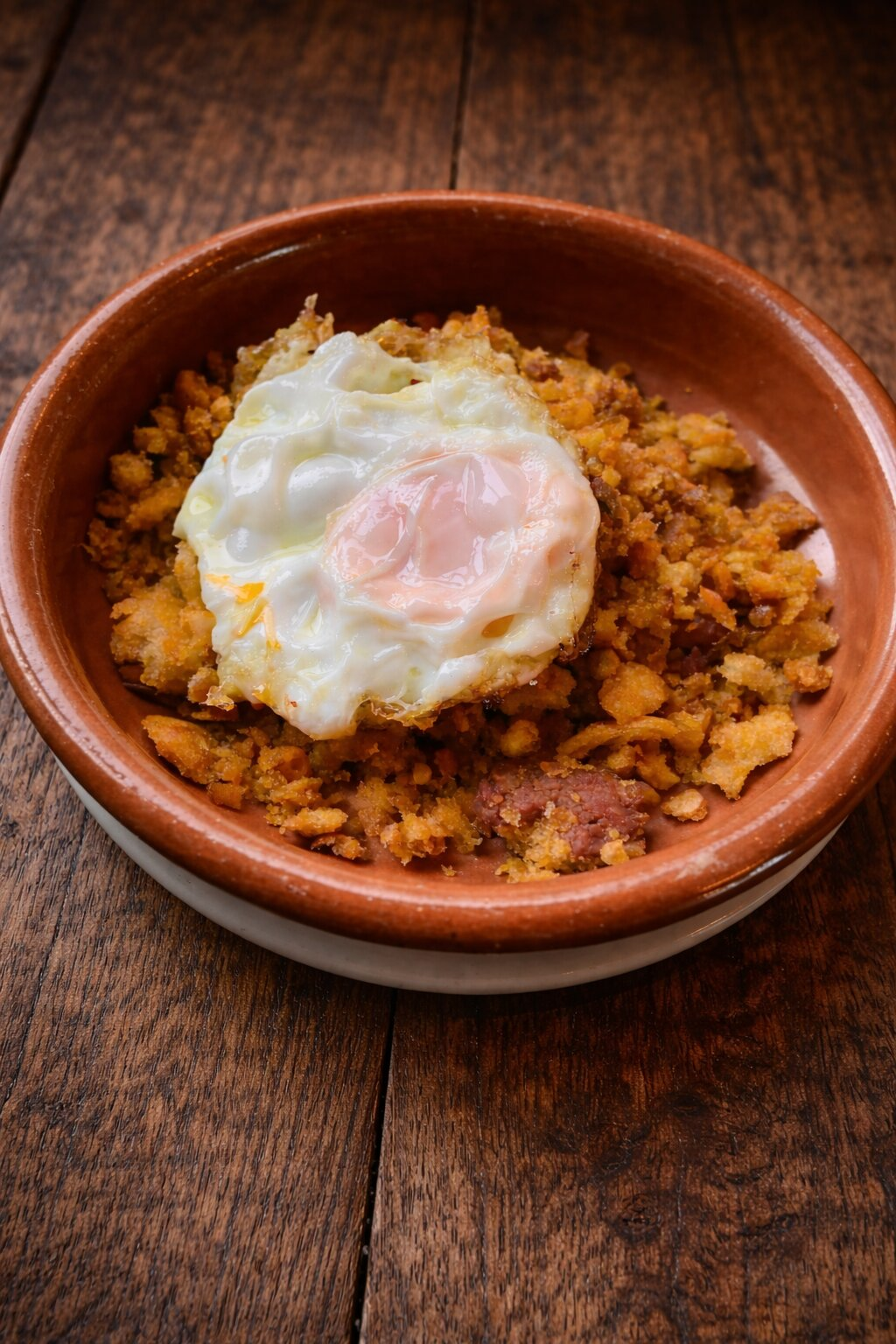
A typical plate of migas is often enjoyed for breakfast at a Spanish montería

After breakfast, the owner of the grounds or captain of the montería gives a speech where he provides detailed information on the game quotas, species, genders and characteristics (age, quality) of animals that can be shot, as well as explaining the safety procedures and timings etc. He will often finalise his speech by a prayer and at times, this is concluded with a group cry "¡Viva España y viva la Virgen de la Cabeza!" (long live Spain and the Virgin of Cabeza) or "¡Viva España y viva el rey!" (long live Spain and the king). The relevance of the virgin is that it is the patron saint of monterías and "monteros". Depending on the type of montería, the pegs will then be drawn randomly or previously adjudicated to each "montero". Hunters will then meet up with their respective "postores" and "armadas", to be led by them to their assigned shooting pegs.

Between 10 and 12 in the morning, and after every hunter is already in their peg, the release of dogs takes place. The dogs will scramble through the forest to force the game to leave their shelter and enter the hunting area.

Between 2 and 4 in the afternoon, the hunting is usually finalised, and this is communicated through a series of conches, once the dogs have finished their work. Straight after this, the hunter must mark his kills. Ideally, an identifying tag on the harvested animal(s) and/or on a nearby tree or bush will be placed as a visible sign, so that the "arrieros" and their mules can easily find it. The hunters then return to the house to enjoy lunch and comment on the montería. A typical lunch will normally consist of a warm spoon dish, usually a cocido, soup or puchero.

During the afternoon, the harvested animals begin to arrive to the house or meeting point, where the hunters will be able to appreciate them collectively and will normally take photographs. This is called the "junta de carnes" (literally meat gathering). Veterinaries and butchers will then proceed to extract the healthy animals' meat, which is, together with the trophies, almost always the owner's property, although the latter are usually given away for the hunter to keep as a token.

If it has been a particular hunter(s) first montería kill, the tradition of the "noviazgo" is sometimes carried out (however this tradition is not seen with good eyes by many hunters in Spain). Essentially, the new hunter will be affectionately 'judged' by the captain of the montería on his or her kill. The hunter will be 'defended' by a 'defense attorney', whose job is merely ceremonial, since the hunter will be found 'guilty' and 'convicted' regardless. Once this friendly act is finished, some participants of the hunt will rub the animal's blood and guts against the hunter's face, similar to what happens in other European countries. He will sometimes be bestowed with a certificate that authenticates and validates the person as an official "montero".

=== People ===
- The capitán de la montería (captain of the montería) coordinates, organizes and directs the hunting altogether, being the highest authority in the celebration, and ultimately responsible for what happens in it. He makes the necessary decisions for the proper functioning of all matters related to the montería, gives the pertinent instructions to the monteros, coordinates all the assistant personnel, sets the rules to follow and resolves with his decisions any type of controversy that may occur.
- The maestro de sierra (master of the sierra) is usually the gamekeeper of the finca or a local, whose role is to assist the captain of the montería as a practical connoisseur of the spot and its game, plan the closure of the same and the strategy for the loosing of the dogs.

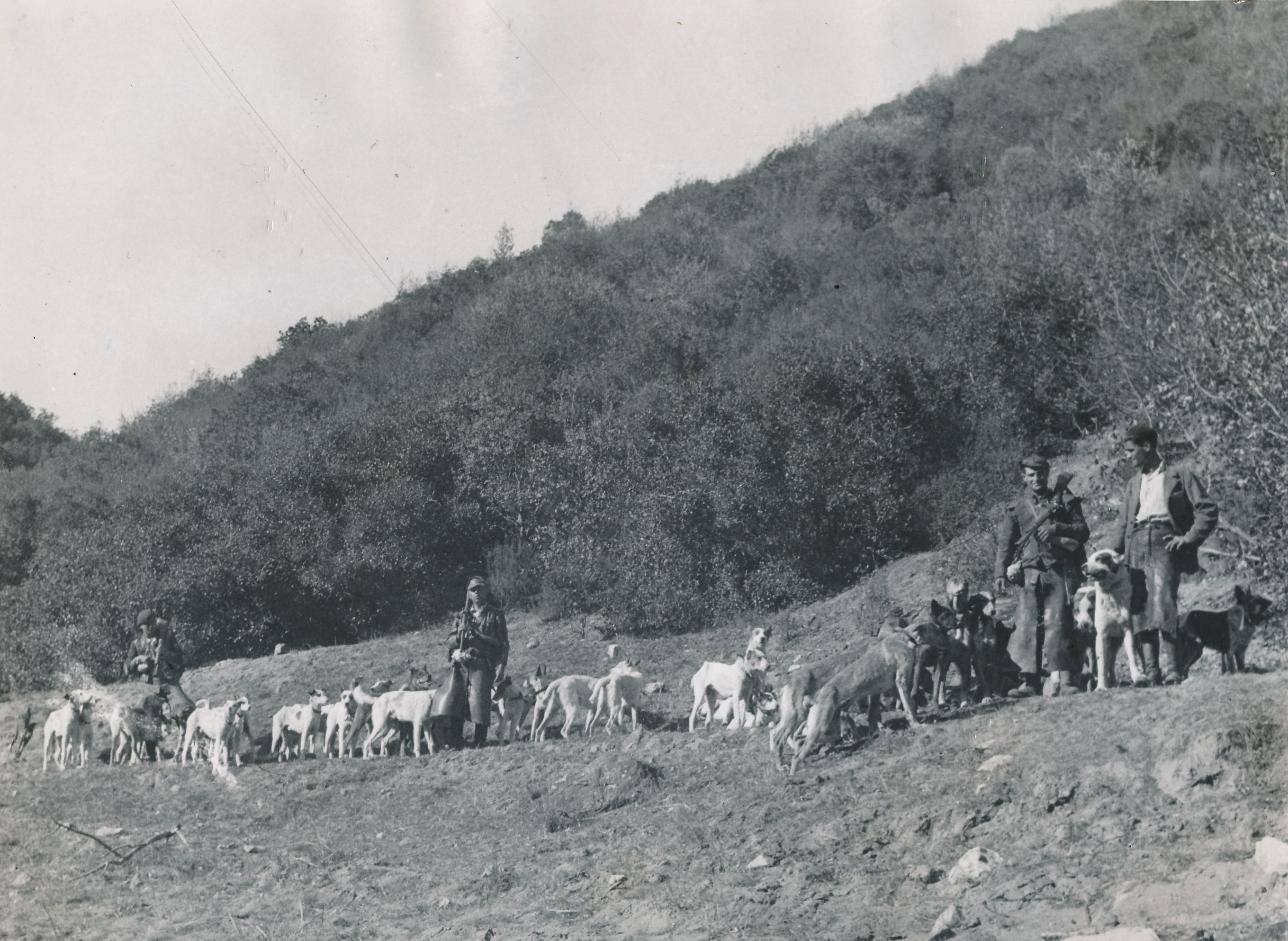
A pair of rehalas and their beaters at a montería in the Sierra de Hornachuelos, 1950

- The rehaleros, also referred to as perreros or podenqueros (masters of hounds or beaters) are the heart and soul of the Spanish montería. They have to work throughout the year with many tasks so that the "rehala" (packs of around 15 to 20 hounds) forms a solid team prepared to take out and chase the game properly. Each day, they must select the most appropriate dogs for the type of hunting they are going to attend, and they must allow dogs to hunt far away or to chase game at great distances, grouping them from time to time through the thickest areas of forest. They must also have good physical resistance to endure the sometimes rough terrain and occasionally adverse weather conditions. The "rehaleros" have many obligations and rules to respect. Their function is to lead their dogs so that the game reaches the "puestos" (pegs) so that huntsmen can shoot at them, killing off any wounded game grabbed by their dogs. They are generally considered to be the "essence" of a montería.
- The postores are those individuals who organize the departure of the "armada", check that all the huntsmen are prepared, order the departure at a particular time, explain the details of each peg to its respective occupant, with express mention of the security measures and where the rest of the pegs will be located. They have to comply with the scheduled times, saving harmful delays for everyone. At the end of the montería, they will be in charge of marking and coordinating the collection of the game that has been hunted in his/her "armada" and of the huntsmen that compose it.
- The monteros (hunstmen) are the actual armed hunters who occupy the pegs. They must respect all the safety regulations, the indications of the captain and the postores, the maximum game quotas established and they must behave in an exemplary and honest manner in their actions.
- The secretarios (peg assistants) are those who go with the montero to the peg. On many occasions, they help the huntsman to reach the peg, advise and help him in whatever he may require, specially with the collecting of game or fast decision such as if an animal should be shot or not. They also help the captain in giving him an estimate of what has been seen in that particular peg, how many animals have been shot etc. Secretarios are generally present only in the most high-end monterías.
- The arrieros (game collectors) are those in charge of picking up the hunted game from the pegs. Sometimes, during the course of the montería, they accompany the rehalas to take the animals collected in the spot or grabbed by the dogs to the loading bays, often with the help of mules. At the end of the hunt, they will visit the pegs of every armada, collect the marked game and bring it to the nearest truck so they can be loaded and taken to the meeting point, a task that must be done in the shortest possible time. Arrieros will then unload the trucks and display the hunted animals in what is called the "junta de carnes" (literally meat gathering), which is normally a flat area near the house, either paved or natural grass. This will be done while the hunters enjoy lunch back in the house.

=== Attire ===
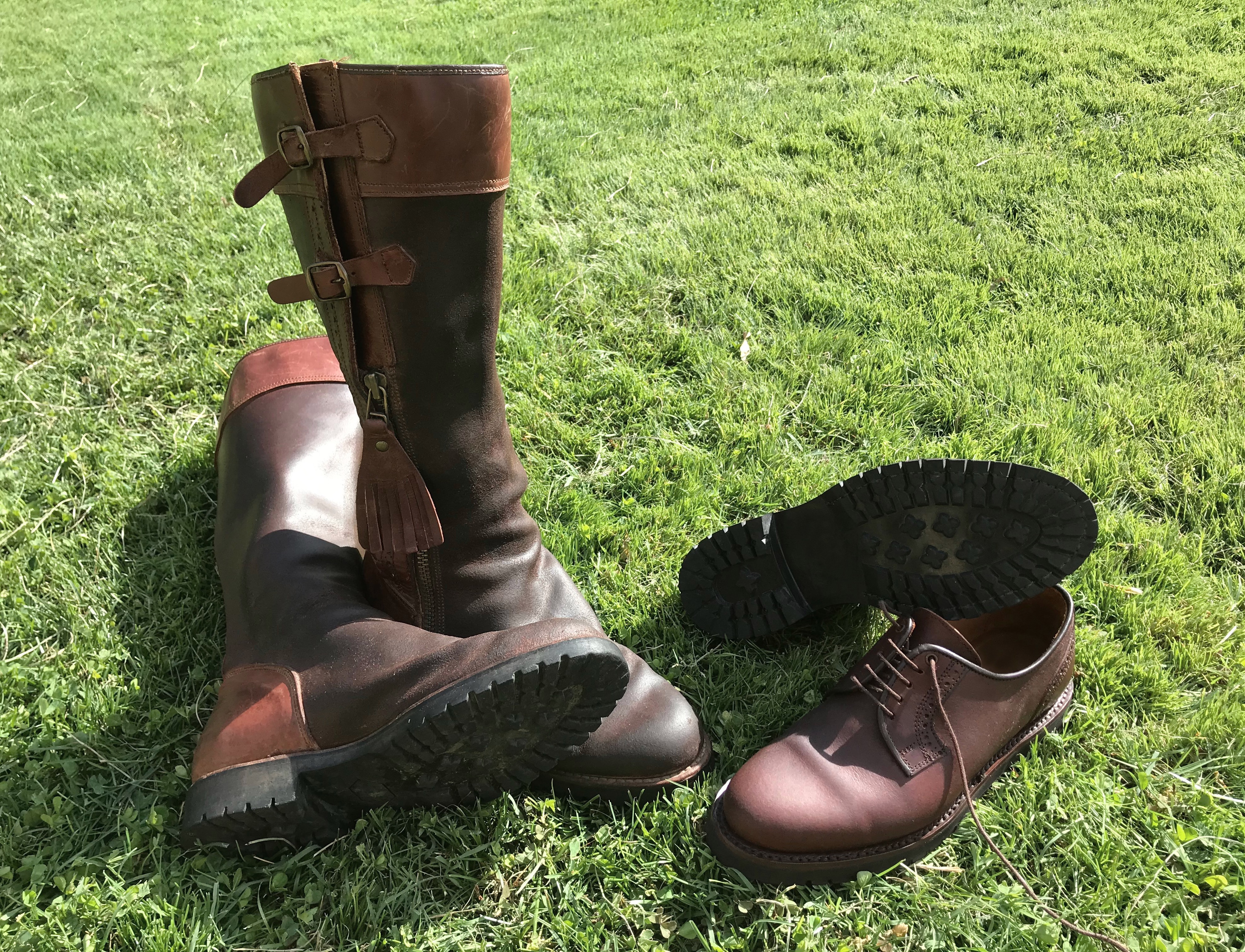
Traditional footwear for "montería española": a pair of Spanish leather boots with fringes (monteras) and a pair of blucher leather shoes with mountain soles (cartujanos)

Attire is one of the most characteristic aspects of a traditional Spanish montería, one that sets it aside from its European counterparts. Essentially, Spanish goods and garments predominate, although British country clothing, Tyrolean hats and Austrian jankers are also prevalent. There is a current stream of critics that argue that technological advances have led way to modern and more 'practical' attires e.g. camouflage and synthetic fibers, that put the heritage of monterías at risk, stressing the importance of respecting a minimum dresscode when at a montería.

The types of garments worn at Spanish monterías vary, but these are significantly more strict and thus noticeable at high-end hunts, or those attended by the traditional elites. Just as monterías norteñas prioritise function over form, and reflective clothes are most common (similar to other European countries), generally speaking, a certain formality is expected at a conventional Spanish montería, and therefore ties and sport jackets are appropriate. Spanish leather goods are amongst the most commonly used elements in a montería. In this regard, zahones (either in leather or Grazalema cloth) are the most iconic piece of equipment of a montería, and are used both by the beaters and the huntsmen, although they have suffered an abandoning in the last decades on behalf of the latter. Footwear such as "monteras" (Spanish artisanal leather boots with fringes) or "zapatos cartujanos" (leather blucher shoes with mountain soles) and leather gaiters are widespread. Bullet belts, montería bags, rifle cases and other Spanish leather items are typical. The world's largest and most important leather craftsman industry is located in the south of Spain, in places like Castilla-La Mancha, where there are manufacturers like "Rey Pavón", the official supplier to James Purdey & Sons, Holland & Holland, Beretta or Cording's of Piccadilly. Incidentally, one of the most revered types of leather, cordovan, is originally from Córdoba, hence the name.

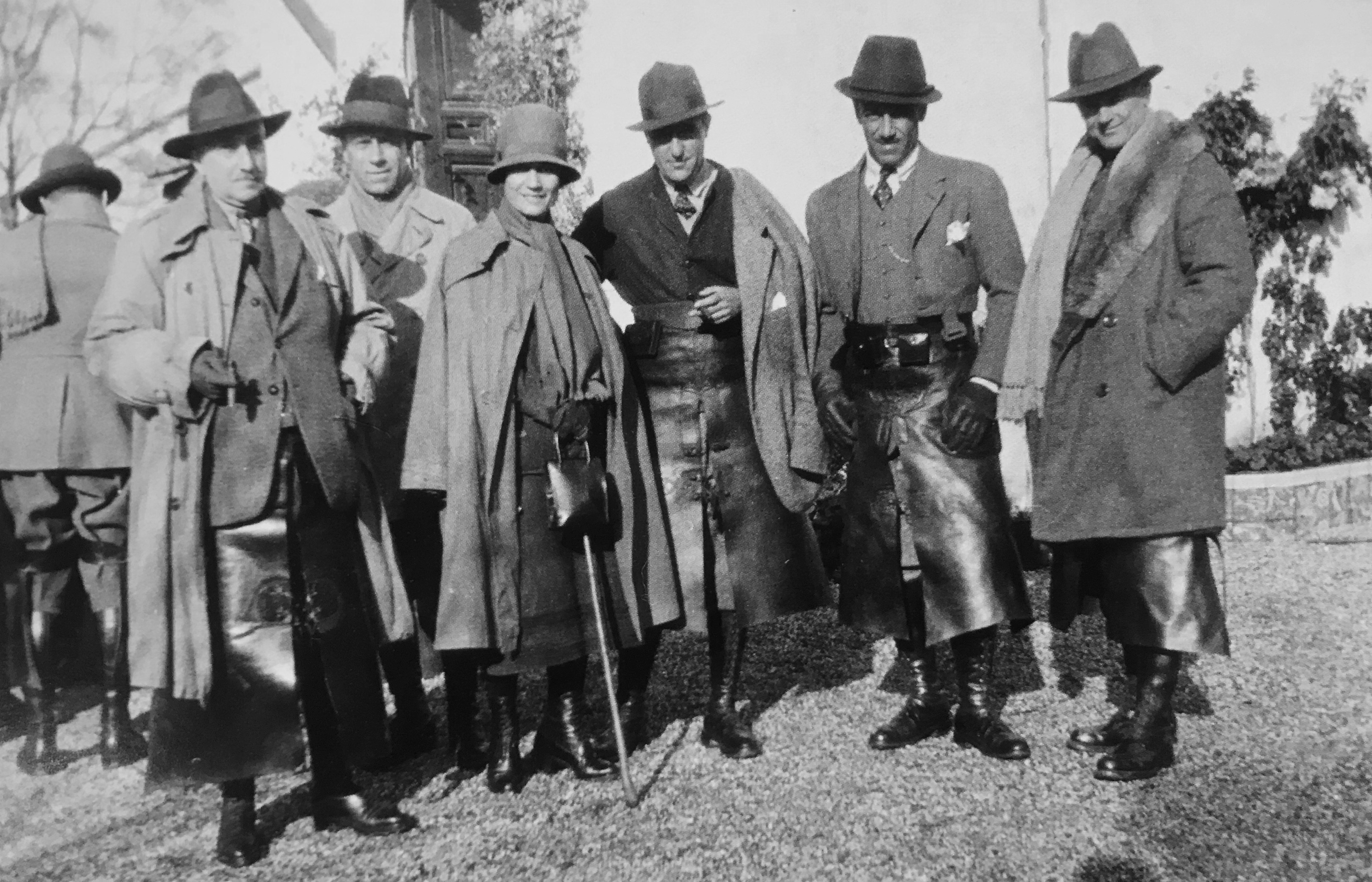
A group of hunters wearing full traditional attire at a montería in Seville, such sophistication being rare nowadays. The 6th Marquess of Alventos is first from the left, Infante Alfonso in the middle and the 8th Count of Yebes next to him, January 1924

Dress codes vary according to the socioeconomic backgrounds of the huntsmen, and so more 'accessible' rural monterías are hardly a solemn event. Commercial monterías i.e. those for which the hunters pay, are a mix in terms of formality; rarely is there a dress code. Spanish monterías by invitation, which tend to be those at well-established fincas, whose ownership is often associated to the aristocracy or peerage, are almost exceptionally a formal event. Examples include "La Garganta" of the Duke of Westminster, "La Toledana" of Prince Pedro of Bourbon-Two Sicilies or Emilio Botín's "El Castaño".

==== Men ====
Despite not being compulsory at all, silk, linen, cashmere or wool ties with either plain or hunting prints are often worn by men. These are accompanied by tattersall dress shirts and cashmere or wool v-neck jumpers in field colours i.e. shades of green, brown or burgundy (in the last years, stronger shades like red have been popularised). Tebas, tweed blazers and Austrian jankers are normally worn on top, although suede blousons have been traditionally worn too, less so today. Loden, tweed or more 'technical' coats can be worn alternatively or in addition. In terms of trousers, field-coloured chinos, corduroys or breeks are often used. During breakfast, formal leather shoes in brown or cordovan are sometimes worn, and these are then replaced when heading to the pegs for more appropriate footwear (leather, mountain or Wellington boots), according to the weather, formality and geographical conditions. Hats in field colours are also popular, particularly tyrolean, fedora and flat caps (Cordovan hats were also used by men until the Spanish Civil War).

==== Women ====
Women's dress code at more formal monterías is not as explicit as men's, and thus is more variable, although neckties are generally not appropriate. Blouses and Tattersall shirts are worn most often, but velvet and silk ones are common too. Similarly, cashmere or wool v-neck jumpers can be worn, and their colours can be brighter than men's. Women can wear waistcoats or standard or fur gilets on top, and either tweed blazers or Austrian jankers in feminine cuts (Tebas are mostly a masculine garment). Coats are worn in a variety of fabrics, with fur elements being relatively common, yet technical ones are perfectly appropriate too. Ponchos and capes can also be observed frequently. Bottoms can be skirts and baggys in country fabrics, breeks, or simple corduroys or chinos, usually not too fitted; bell-bottoms being common. Women's footwear in monterías is similar to men's, and so it is pertinent to wear Spanish leather boots, shoes or simply ankle boots, always in leather and ideally with mountain soles. Wellington boots are convenient when the weather or field conditions dictate. Equally, hats can be worn of the same types as men's, with the distinction that they can be more feminine in style. As a sport, extensive make-up and elaborate jewellery are not proper.

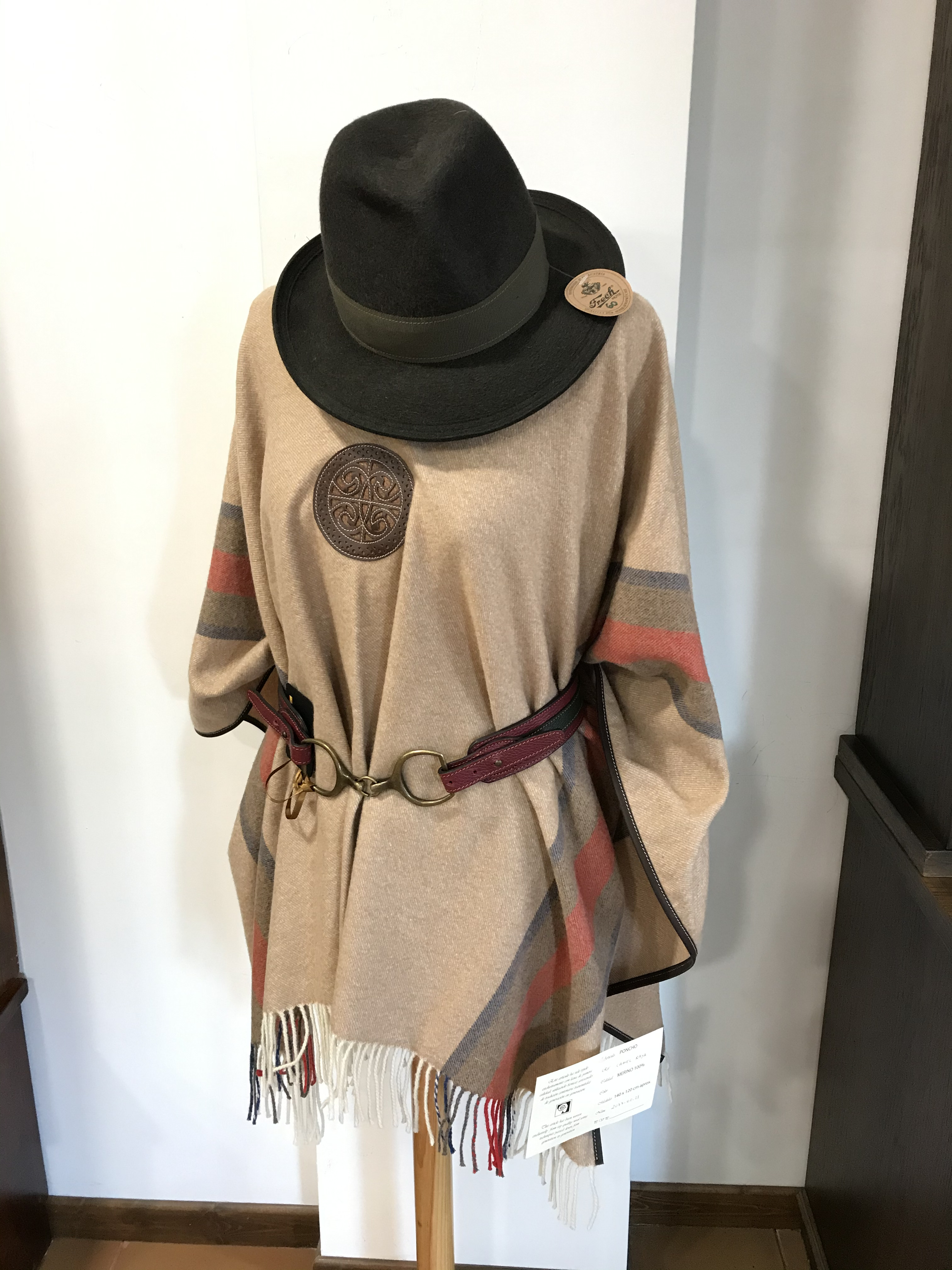
An example of a top-part female attire consisting of a poncho and a fedora hat

The overall functionality of women's outfits at these events is limited. Due to the traditional passive role of women in hunts as mere observers or companions of men, their clothes have evolved to be more 'flamboyant' and less practical. However, this is now changing, as women in Spain are increasingly more interested in the act of hunting, and it is becoming more prevalent for women to be seen at monterías as huntswomen rather than attendants. Withal, the formality of the female attire at higher-end monterías seems to remain largely unaltered. Similar to men, women at more humble rural hunts and monterías norteñas will dismiss formality and the dress criteria will be function over form (reflective and synthetic fibres etc.).

== Montería norteña ==
As was done during the Late Middle Ages, in the north-northwest of Spain, wild boar is hunted in a modality called "hunt on leash". In this type of hunting, the bloodhounds and their beaters, the "monteros", play a leading role. Contrary to Spanish monterías, only wild boars are shot here, with the exception of foxes or occasionally one Iberian wolf per hunt.

In the early hours of the morning each beater goes out with his hound dog tied to a long leash called a "traílla" to look for the trail of wild boars. Once a trace of the previous night has been found, the beater, aided by the nose and ability of his hound, will follow the nocturnal footsteps of the animal, often for many kilometres until he finds the place where he is bedridden, resting during the day.

To corroborate that the wild boar is in a certain thicket, the beater and his hound, after entering the boar's trail in it, proceed to go around it to see if the boar has continued its path or remains resting. If it has left, the beater will continue following the trail with his hound on to another thicket where he will repeat the strategy.

The beds of adult male wild boars are preferably chosen as the target of the hunt. Hunters are stationed with firearms surrounding the "mancha" thicket, whose extension can vary from a few hectares to several hundred. It is at that moment that a few hounds (usually between 2 and 10) are released on the trail of entry of the wild boar in the forest. The hounds mark the path made by the wild boar during the night with their voice, called "latido" (heartbeat), until they reach the place where the wild boar is resting, where the dogs bark at it continuously with courage but without attacking it directly. What is achieved through this strategy is that the wild boar breaks into a run while the hounds chase it "latiendo" (barking) until the boar is forced to pass through the "puesto" (peg) where there is a hunter with his rifle, who tries to shoot him down. On many occasions the hounds have to chase the wild boar for a long time until it breaks at some point where a hunter is located.

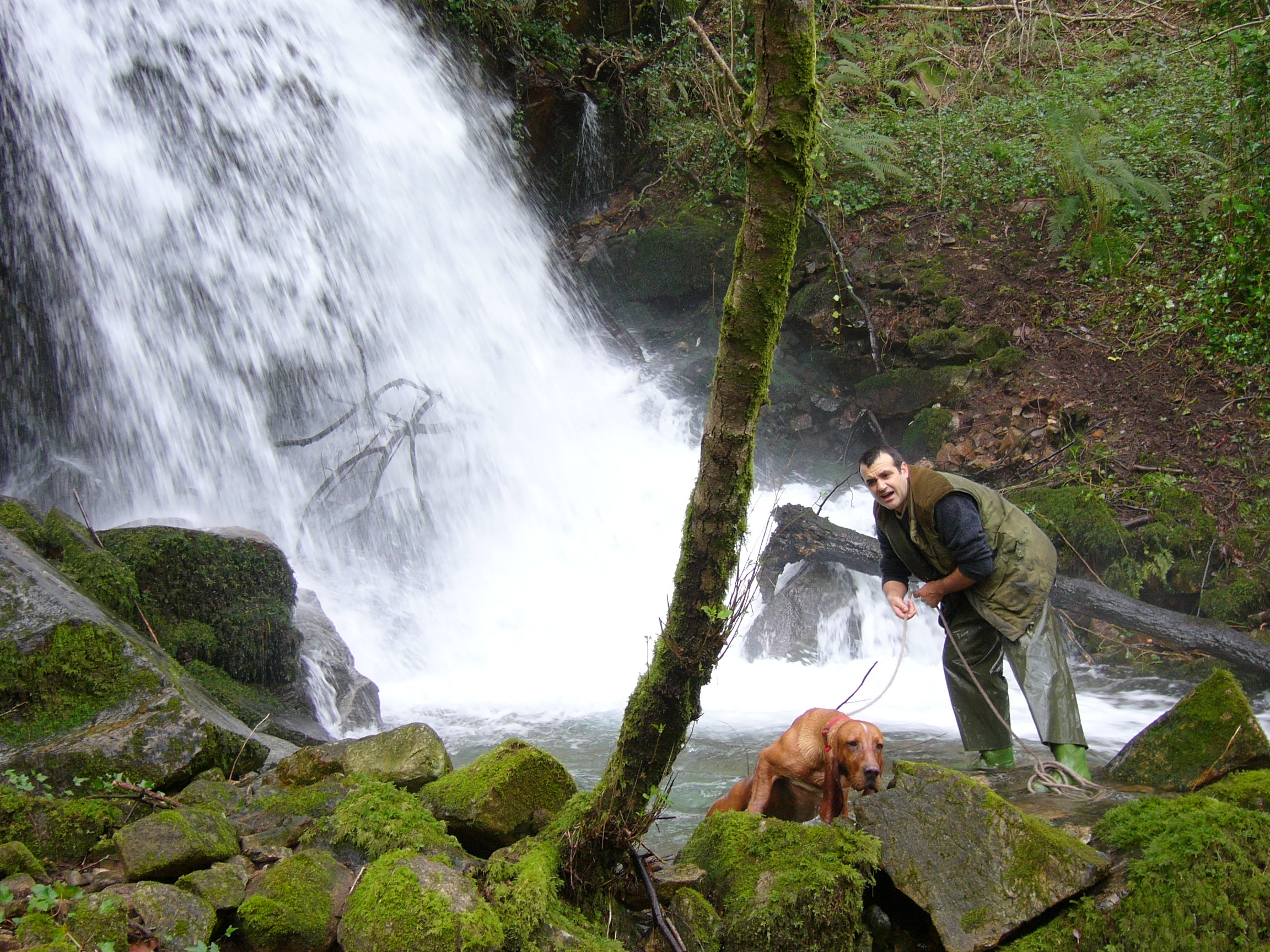
Beater with his bloodhound during a montería in Galicia, northern Spain

Generally, the groups of people dedicated to this type of hunting, called "cuadrillas", are made up of up to 20 hunters, among which there is a variable number of beaters with their hounds, the number of dogs used in total ranging from 5 to 20.

This type of hunting is very selective, since the animal to hunt is chosen avoiding disturbing females with their offspring. Furthermore, practically no other animal is disturbed other than the one to be hunted (almost always boar in northern Spain) since it is an inexcusable mistake for dogs to chase any other animal than wild boar.

As can be seen, practically the only great difference that exists between this form of hunting and medieval hunting is that hunting dogs and sighthounds have been replaced by firearms.

Species that are currently shot in monterías norteñas include:

- Wild boar (always)
- Red fox (occasionally)
- Iberian wolf (occasionally and only north of the Douro river)

Cantabrian bears were hunted in monterías norteñas until 1967, when they were protected after almost becoming extinct.

== In popular culture ==
=== Film ===
- Monterías feature in El mundo de Juan Lobón (1989), miniseries produced by Televisión Española and based on the eponymous novel by Luis Berenguer.
- In season 12 of Wild Boar Fever (2023), miniseries produced by MyOutdoorTV.com, a group of European hunters accompanied by Franz Albrecht zu Oettingen-Spielberg participate in a series of monterías in Castilla–La Mancha.

== See also ==
- Hunting in Spain
- Big-game hunting
- Trophy hunting
- Fox hunting
- Junta Nacional de Homologación de Trofeos de Caza

== Bibliography ==
- Anderson, Robert S. (1984). 1984 Gun Digest Hunting Annual. DBI Books Inc. ISBN 978-09-10676-68-7.
- Calnal, Christopher (1992). "The Conservation of Spanish Gilt Leather". Studies in Conservation. 37 (1). Taylor & Francis. doi:10.1179/sic.1992.37.s1.005.
- Castejón, Perico (2014). La Montería Tradicional Española y sus Rehalas: Costumbres y Normas. La Trébere.
- Castejón, Perico (2002). La Rehala: Una Vocación, una vida. Agualarga. ISBN 978-84-95088-56-7.
- Chapman, Abel; Buck, Walter J. (1910). Unexplored Spain. Edward Arnold.
- Chapman, Abel; Buck, Walter J. (1893). Wild Spain. Gurney and Jackson.
- Florido del Corral, David (2017). "Valores Culturales, Discursos y Conflictos en torno a la Caza. El Caso de las Monterías Sociales en Andalucía" (PDF). Revista Andaluza de Antropología. 13 (2). Universidad de Sevilla.
- López Ontiveros, Antonio (1991). "Algunos Aspectos de la Evolución de la Caza en España" (PDF). Agricultura y Sociedad. 58 (1). Universidad de La Rioja.
- Palenzuela Chamorro, Pablo (2017). Documentación Técnica del Expediente para la Declaración de la Montería y la Rehala como Bien de Interés Cultural en Andalucía (PDF). Junta de Andalucía.
- Sánchez Garrido, Roberto (2013). Caza, cazadores y medio ambiente: breve etnografía cinegética. Editorial Club Universitario. ISBN 978-84-99481-61-6.
