= List of ambassadors of Spain to the United States =

Ambassador of Spain to the United States
- Coat of Arms of Spain

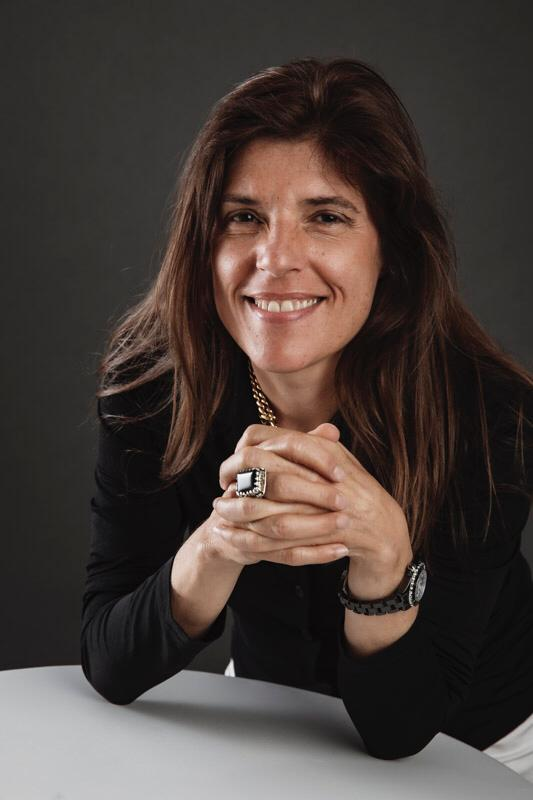
- Incumbent; Ángeles Moreno Bau since 1 February 2024
- Ministry of Foreign Affairs
- Style: Her Excellency
- Residence: Foxhall Road NW, Washington D.C
- Nominator: The Foreign Minister
- Appointer: The Monarch
- Formation: May 21, 1785; 241 years ago
- First holder: Diego de Gardoqui
- Deputy: Deputy Chief of Mission at the Embassy of Spain to the United States
- Website: https://www.exteriores.gob.es/Embajadas/washington/en/Paginas/index.aspx

The ambassador of Spain to the United States is Spain's foremost diplomatic representative in the United States, and in charge of the Spain's diplomatic mission in the United States.

== History ==
The ambassador is appointed to the Council of Ministers, they direct the work of all the offices that depend on the embassy, based in Washington, D.C. Likewise, it informs the Spanish Government about the evolution of events in the United States, negotiates on behalf of Spain, can sign or ratify agreements, observes the development of bilateral relations in all fields and ensures the protection of Spanish interests and its citizens in the United States.

== Heads of mission (1785-2025) ==
Mission Start	Mission End	Name	Title	Appointed By	Accredited Before
21 May 1785	3 October 1789	Diego de Gardoqui	Charge d'Affaires ad interim	Charles III	United States Congress
3 October 1789	1 December 1791	José Ignacio de Viar	Secretary of legation; acted as Charge d'Affaires ad interim	Charles IV	George Washington
1 December 1791	3 May 1794	José Ignacio de Viar; José de Jáudenes y Nebot (Note: Jáudenes began to act independently of Viar between March 5 and 22 August 1794. He gave notice of intended return to Spain 25 April 1796. Viar's services ended 3 May 1794.)	Charges d'Affaires ad interim	Charles IV	George Washington
25 April 1796	1 August 1796	José Ignacio de Viar	Secretary of legation; acted as Charge d'Affaires ad interim	Charles IV	George Washington
25 August 1796	7 July 1807	Carlos Martínez de Irujo	Envoy Extraordinary and Minister Plenipotentiary	Charles IV	George Washington
7 July 1807	7 October 1809	Valentin de Foronda	Envoy Extraordinary and Minister Plenipotentiary	Charles IV	Thomas Jefferson
7 October 1809	10 May 1819	Luis de Onís	Envoy Extraordinary and Minister Plenipotentiary	Ferdinand VII	James Madison
10 May 1819	12 April 1820	Mateo de la Serna	Charge d'Affaires ad interim	Ferdinand VII	James Monroe
12 April 1820	30 September 1821	Francisco Dionisio Vives	Envoy Extraordinary and Minister Plenipotentiary	Ferdinand VII	James Monroe
30 October 1821	31 October 1821	Francisco Hilario Rivas y Salmon	Secretary of legation; acted as Charge d'Affaires ad interim	Ferdinand VII	James Monroe
31 October 1821	11 November 1833	Joaquín de Anduaga	Envoy Extraordinary and Minister Plenipotentiary	Ferdinand VII	James Monroe
15 March 1825	25 July 1827	Francisco Hilario Rivas y Salmon	Secretary of legation; acted as Charge d'Affaires ad interim	Ferdinand VII	James Monroe
11 November 1833	30 June 1835	Francisco Tacon y Rosique	Envoy Extraordinary and Minister Plenipotentiary	Regency of María Cristina	Andrew Jackson
30 June 1835	7 December 1835	Manuel Tacon	Secretary of legation; acted as Charge d'Affaires ad interim	Regency of María Cristina	Andrew Jackson
7 December 1835	1836	Ángel Calderón de la Barca y Belgrano	Envoy Extraordinary and Minister Plenipotentiary	Regency of María Cristina	Andrew Jackson
4 October 1837	28 April 1838	Manuel Tacon	Secretary of legation; acted as Charge d'Affaires ad interim	Regency of María Cristina	Martin Van Buren
26 September 1839	2 January 1844	Pedro Aloantara Argaiz	Envoy Extraordinary and Minister Plenipotentiary	Regency of Baldomero Espartero	Martin Van Buren
2 January 1844	5 August 1844	Fidencio Beurman	Charge d'Affaires ad interim	Ramón María Narváez	John Tyler (until 1845); James K. Polk (1845–1849); Zachary Taylor (1849–1850); Millard Fillmore (1850–1853)
5 August 1844	2 August 1853	Ángel Calderón de la Barca y Belgrano	Minister resident	Ramón María Narváez	John Tyler (until 1845); James K. Polk (1845–1849); Zachary Taylor (1849–1850); Millard Fillmore (1850–1853)
2 August 1853	30 May 1854	Jose Maria Magallon	Secretary of legation; acted as Charge d'Affaires ad interim	Ramón María Narváez	Franklin Pierce
30 May 1854	14 July 1855	Leopoldo Augusto de cueto	Envoy Extraordinary and Minister Plenipotentiary	Luis José Sartorius	Franklin Pierce
1 October 1855	11 September 1856	Alfonso Escalante	Envoy Extraordinary and Minister Plenipotentiary	Baldomero Espartero	Franklin Pierce
11 November 1856	21 February 1857	Jose Maria Magallon	Secretary of legation; acted as Charge d'Affaires ad interim	Baldomero Espartero	Franklin Pierce
21 February 1857	7 April 1867	Gabriel García y Tassura	Envoy Extraordinary and Minister Plenipotentiary	Leopoldo O'Donnell	James Buchanan (until 1861); Abraham Lincoln (1861–1865); Andrew Johnson (from 1865)
7 April 1867	15 December 1868	Facundo Geni	Envoy Extraordinary and Minister Plenipotentiary	Ramon Maria Narvaez	James Buchanan (until 1861); Abraham Lincoln (1861–1865); Andrew Johnson (from 1865)
19 March 1869	20 March 1872	Mauricio López Róberts	Envoy Extraordinary and Minister Plenipotentiary	Francisco Serrano	Ulysses S. Grant
5 April 1872	1 July 1874	José Polo de Bernabé	Envoy Extraordinary and Minister Plenipotentiary	Praxedes Mateo Sagasta	Ulysses S. Grant
1 July 1874	15 September 1874	Luis de Potestad	Charge d'Affaires ad interim	Praxedes Mateo Sagasta	Ulysses S. Grant
15 September 1874	14 August 1878	Antonio Mantilla de los Ríos	Envoy Extraordinary and Minister Plenipotentiary	Juan Zavala de la Puente	Ulysses S. Grant
14 August 1878	3 February 1879	Jose Brunetti y Gayeso	Charge d'Affaires ad interim	Juan Zavala de la Puente	Rutherford B. Hayes
3 February 1879	2 March 1881	Felipe Mendes de Vigo y Oserio	Envoy Extraordinary and Minister Plenipotentiary	Antonio Canovas del Castillo	Rutherford B. Hayes
2 March 1881	30 April 1881	Jose Brunetti y Gayeso	Charge d'Affaires ad interim	Antonio Canovas del Castillo	James A. Garfield
30 April 1881	29 July 1883	Francisco Barea del Corral	Envoy Extraordinary and Minister Plenipotentiary	Praxedes Mateo Sagasta	Chester A. Arthur
29 July 1883	29 January 1884	Enrique Dupuy de Lôme	Charge d'Affaires ad interim	Praxedes Mateo Sagasta	Chester A. Arthur
29 January 1884	11 February 1886	Juan Valera y Alcalá-Galiano	Envoy Extraordinary and Minister Plenipotentiary	José Posada Herrera	Chester A. Arthur
6 April 1886	29 October 1890	Emilio de Muruaga	Envoy Extraordinary and Minister Plenipotentiary	Praxedes Mateo Sagasta	Grover Cleveland
14 November 1890	28 November 1891	Miguel Saurez Guanes	Envoy Extraordinary and Minister Plenipotentiary	Antonio Canovas del Castillo	Grover Cleveland
28 November 1891	30 September 1892	Jose Felipe Sagrario	Charge d'Affaires ad interim	Antonio Canovas del Castillo	Benjamin Harrison
30 September 1892	31 January 1893	Enrique Dupuy de Lôme	Envoy Extraordinary and Minister Plenipotentiary	Antonio Canovas del Castillo	Benjamin Harrison
2 March 1893	16 April 1895	Emilio de Muruaga	Envoy Extraordinary and Minister Plenipotentiary	Praxedes Mateo Sagasta	Grover Cleveland
16 April 1895	6 May 1895	Jose Felipe Sagrario	Charge d'Affaires ad interim	Praxedes Mateo Sagasta	Grover Cleveland
6 May 1895	11 February 1898	Enrique Dupuy de Lôme	Envoy Extraordinary and Minister Plenipotentiary	Praxedes Mateo Sagasta	Grover Cleveland
11 February 1898	20 April 1898	Juan du Besu	First secretary; Charge d'Affaires ad interim	Praxedes Mateo Sagasta	William McKinley
20 April 1898	25 April 1898	Luis Polo de Bernabé	Envoy Extraordinary and Minister Plenipotentiary	Praxedes Mateo Sagasta	William McKinley
Rupture of relations due to the Spanish–American War from May 1898 to May 1899
3 June 1899	22 November 1901	Jose Brunetti y Gayeso, Duke of Arcos	Envoy Extraordinary and Minister Plenipotentiary	Francisco Silvela	William McKinley
22 November 1901	22 July 1902	Juan Riaño y Gayangos	Charge d'Affaires ad interim	Francisco Silvela	Theodore Roosevelt
22 July 1902	20 March 1905	Emilio de Ojeda y Perpiñán	Envoy Extraordinary and Minister Plenipotentiary	Praxedes Mateo Sagasta	Theodore Roosevelt
11 April 1905	30 April 1905	Manuel Walls y Merino	Charge d'Affaires ad interim	Francisco Silvela	Theodore Roosevelt
30 April 1905	June 1905	Luis Pastor	Charge d'Affaires ad interim	Francisco Silvela	Theodore Roosevelt
June 1905	12 January 1907	Bernardo Jacinto de Cólogan (Note: Reportedly never received by President.)	Envoy Extraordinary and Minister Plenipotentiary	Francisco Silvela	Theodore Roosevelt
13 March 1907	19 May 1909	Ramón Piña y Millet	Envoy Extraordinary and Minister Plenipotentiary	Antonio Aguilar y Correa	Theodore Roosevelt
24 June 1909	19 May 1909	Luis Pastor	Charge d'Affaires ad interim	Antonio Maura William Howard Taft	
19 May 1909	1 February 1910	Rodrigo de Saavedra y Vinent, 2nd Marquess of Villalobar	Envoy Extraordinary and Minister Plenipotentiary	Antonio Maura William Howard Taft	William Howard Taft
10 February 1910	24 May 1910	Francisco de Zea Bermudes	Charge d'Affaires ad interim	Antonio Maura William Howard Taft	William Howard Taft
24 May 1910	1 December 1913	Juan Riaño y Gayangos	Envoy Extraordinary and Minister Plenipotentiary	Jose Canalejas	William Howard Taft
Legation became an embassy on 1 December 1913
1 December 1913	31 July 1926	Juan Riaño y Gayangos	Ambassador Extraordinary and Plenipotentiary	Jose Canalejas	Woodrow Wilson (1913–1921); Warren G. Harding (1921–1923); Calvin Coolidge (1923–1929)
23 August 1926	21 September 1926	Mariano de Amoedo y Galarmendi	Charge d'Affaires ad interim	Jose Canalejas	Woodrow Wilson (1913–1921); Warren G. Harding (1921–1923); Calvin Coolidge (1923–1929)
21 September 1926	11 October 1926	Eduardo Garcia Comin	Consular of Embassy	Jose Canalejas	Woodrow Wilson (1913–1921); Warren G. Harding (1921–1923); Calvin Coolidge (1923–1929)
11 October 1926	7 June 1931	Alejandro Padilla y Bell	Ambassador Extraordinary and Plenipotentiary	Miguel Primo de Rivera	Calvin Coolidge (until 1929); Herbert Hoover (1929–1933)
15 April 1931	30 June 1931	Count de Montefuerte	Charge d'Affaires ad interim	Miguel Primo de Rivera	Calvin Coolidge (until 1929); Herbert Hoover (1929–1933)
30 June 1931	23 December 1931	Salvador de Madariaga	Ambassador Extraordinary and Plenipotentiary	Niceto Alcalá-Zamora	Calvin Coolidge (until 1929); Herbert Hoover (1929–1933)
10 January 1932	8 April 1934	Juan Francisco de Cárdenas	Ambassador Extraordinary and Plenipotentiary	Niceto Alcalá-Zamora	Calvin Coolidge (until 1929); Herbert Hoover (1929–1933)
8 April 1934	10 September 1936	Luis Calderón y Martín	Ambassador Extraordinary and Plenipotentiary	Niceto Alcalá-Zamora	Franklin D. Roosevelt
11 September 1936	20 October 1936	Enrique de la Casa	Charge d'Affaires ad interim	Niceto Alcalá-Zamora	Franklin D. Roosevelt
20 October 1936	March 1939	Fernando de los Ríos	Ambassador Extraordinary and Plenipotentiary	Manuel Azaña	Franklin D. Roosevelt
The Embassy was closed in April 1939; the National (Franco) government was recognized on 1 April 1939, and the embassy reopened in May 1939
3 April 1939	6 June 1939	Juan Francisco de Cárdenas	Charge d'Affaires ad interim	Francisco Franco	Franklin D. Roosevelt
6 June 1939	1947	Juan Francisco de Cárdenas	Ambassador Extraordinary and Plenipotentiary	Francisco Franco	Franklin D. Roosevelt
19 August 1946	20 September 1949	German Baraibar	Minister Plenipotentiary; Charge d'Affaires ad interim	Francisco Franco	Harry S. Truman
20 September 1949	5 January 1951	Eduardo Propper de Callejón	Minister Plenipotentiary; Charge d'Affaires ad interim	Francisco Franco	Harry S. Truman
5 January 1951	10 August 1954	José Félix de Lequerica	Ambassador Extraordinary and Plenipotentiary	Francisco Franco	Harry S. Truman
2 November 1954	7 July 1960	Jose Maria Areilza, Count of Motrico	Ambassador Extraordinary and Plenipotentiary	Francisco Franco	Dwight D. Eisenhower
4 August 1960	5 April 1962	Mariano Yturralde y Orbegoso	Ambassador Extraordinary and Plenipotentiary	Francisco Franco	Dwight D. Eisenhower
1 June 1962	13 February 1964	Antonio Garrigues Díaz-Cañabate	Ambassador Extraordinary and Plenipotentiary	Francisco Franco	John F. Kennedy
21 April 1964	19 December 1969	Alfonso Merry del Val y Alzola, Marquess of Merry del Val	Ambassador Extraordinary and Plenipotentiary	Francisco Franco	Lyndon B. Johnson
19 December 1969	4 February 1972	Santiago Argüelles Armada	Ambassador Extraordinary and Plenipotentiary	Francisco Franco	Richard Nixon
7 March 1972	6 May 1974 (Note: Died in office.)	Ángel Sagaz Zubelzu	Ambassador Extraordinary and Plenipotentiary	Carlos Arias Navarro	Richard Nixon
6 May 1974	7 August 1974	Joaquin Cervino	Minister Counselor; Charge d'Affaires ad interim	Carlos Arias Navarro	Gerald Ford
7 August 1974	8 October 1976	Jaime Alba Delibes	Ambassador Extraordinary and Plenipotentiary	Carlos Arias Navarro	Gerald Ford
8 October 1976	8 June 1978	José Rovira y Sánchez-Herrero	Ambassador Extraordinary and Plenipotentiary	Adolfo Suarez	Gerald Ford
27 July 1978	24 July 1982	Jose Llado y Fernandez-Urrutia	Ambassador Extraordinary and Plenipotentiary	Adolfo Suarez	Jimmy Carter
20 September 1982	16 February 1983	Nuño Aguirre de Carcer y Lopez de Sagredo	Ambassador Extraordinary and Plenipotentiary	Felipe González	Ronald Reagan
31 March 1983	6 March 1987	Gabriel Mañueco de Lecea	Ambassador Extraordinary and Plenipotentiary	Felipe González	Ronald Reagan
31 March 1987	2 March 1990	Julián Santamaría Ossorio	Ambassador Extraordinary and Plenipotentiary	Felipe González	Ronald Reagan
17 April 1990	28 June 1996	Jaime de Ojeda y Eiseley	Ambassador Extraordinary and Plenipotentiary	Felipe González	George H. W. Bush (1989–1993); Bill Clinton (1993–2001)
28 August 1996	30 June 2000	Antonio de Oyarzabal	Ambassador Extraordinary and Plenipotentiary	José María Aznar	George H. W. Bush (1989–1993); Bill Clinton (1993–2001)
2 August 2000	25 June 2004	Francisco Javier Ruperez Rubio	Ambassador Extraordinary and Plenipotentiary	José María Aznar	Bill Clinton (until 2001); George W. Bush (2001–2009)
12 August 2004	18 July 2008	Carlos Westendorp	Ambassador Extraordinary and Plenipotentiary	José Luis Rodríguez Zapatero	Bill Clinton (until 2001); George W. Bush (2001–2009)
21 August 2008	13 April 2012	Jorge Dezcallar de Mazarredo	Ambassador Extraordinary and Plenipotentiary	José Luis Rodríguez Zapatero	Barack Obama
5 June 2012	24 March 2017	Ramon Gil-Casares Satrustegui	Ambassador Extraordinary and Plenipotentiary	Mariano Rajoy	Barack Obama
24 March 2017	7 September 2018	Pedro Morenés	Ambassador Extraordinary and Plenipotentiary	Mariano Rajoy	Donald Trump (until 2021; from 2025); Joe Biden (2021–2025)
7 September 2018	17 January 2024	Santiago Cabanas	Ambassador Extraordinary and Plenipotentiary	Pedro Sanchez	Donald Trump (until 2021; from 2025); Joe Biden (2021–2025)
16 January 2024	20 January 2025	Ángeles Moreno Bau	Ambassador Extraordinary and Plenipotentiary	Pedro Sanchez	Donald Trump (until 2021; from 2025); Joe Biden (2021–2025)

== See also ==
- Spain – United States relations
- Foreign relations of Spain
- List of ambassadors of the United States to Spain
