= Juan Francisco de Cárdenas =

Spanish diplomat

His Excellency Juan Francisco de Cárdenas
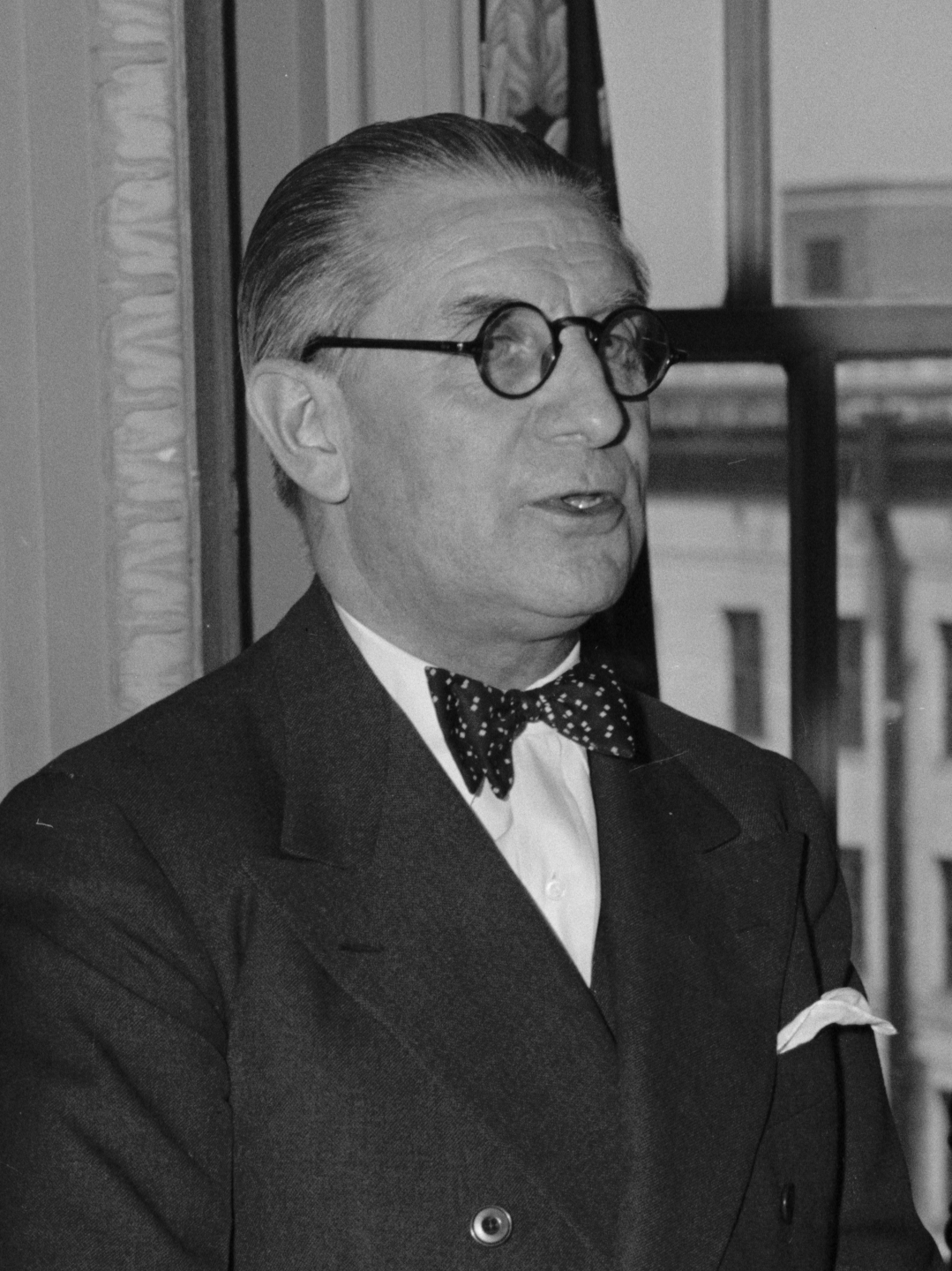
- Photograph of Cárdenas, 1939

Spanish Ambassador to the United States
- In office 1939–1947
- Preceded by: Fernando de los Ríos
- Succeeded by: Eduardo Propper de Callejón
- In office 1932–1934
- Preceded by: Salvador de Madariaga
- Succeeded by: Luis Calderón y Martín

Spanish Ambassador to France
- In office 1934–1936
- Preceded by: José María Aquinaga
- Succeeded by: Luis Araquistáin

Spanish Minister at Tokyo
- In office 1931–1932
- Preceded by: Luis Dupuy de Lôme y Vidiella
- Succeeded by: Pedro Antonio Satorras y Dameto

Personal details
- Born: Juan Francisco de Cárdenas y Rodríguez de Rivas; 5 May 1881 Seville, Spain
- Died: 16 January 1966 (aged 84) Madrid, Spain
- Spouse: Lucienne Nano

Juan Francisco de Cárdenas y Rodríguez de Rivas (5 May 1881 – 16 January 1966) was a Spanish diplomat.

== Early life ==
Cárdenas was born in Seville on 5 May 1881 to Juan de Cárdenas, a magistrate and a state councilor. A member of an earlier generation of his family, Francisco de Cárdenas, served as Spain's Minister of Justice.

After attending high school at the San Isidro Institute in Madrid, he was educated at the Universities of Salamanca and Seville.

== Career ==
After receiving a law degree, he entered the diplomatic service at 22 as chargé d'affaires in Lisbon. In 1917, after a term in Mexico, he came to the United States serving as first secretary and counselor of the Spanish embassy in Washington, D.C. in the 1920s, and as chamberlain to King Alfonso XIII. He then served as Minister in Bucharest, the capital of Romania.

During the Second Republic, he was Spanish ambassador to Japan from 1931 to 1932, followed by ambassador in Washington, D.C. between 1932 and 1934. His appointment was met favorably in the United States, and a luncheon was given in his honor at the Newport, Rhode Island home of Mrs. Duncan E. Cameron. Among the attendees were Juan Riaño y Gayangos, the former Spanish diplomat who had married an American socialite and heiress.

After Washington, he served as ambassador to the French Republic between 1934 and 1936. After the coup d'état of July 1936 that began the Civil War, it did not take long before he joined the rebels. Despite initially maintaining the appearance of respect for the Republican order, he did everything possible to sabotage the request for weapons that had been made to the French head of government Léon Blum, delaying the processing of the request, which nevertheless was formalized on July 20. José Giral sent Fernando de los Ríos, who was in Geneva, to reinforce the request and to deal with the succession of resignations in the embassy. Cárdenas presented his resignation on July 23.

An aristocrat with monarchical inclinations, he was sent to perform the functions of informal diplomatic representative of the Francoist side in the United States, as "representative of the National government." He boasted of the change of editorial line favorable to Franco of La Nueva España publication from September 1937, pointing it out as his own merit. At the end of the war, he was again made Ambassador to the United States in 1939. He served as Ambassador until 1947 when he relinquished his post "as a result of the December, 1946 United Nations vote that demanded the replacement of the Franco regime with one 'deriving its authority from the governed' and recommended that all member nations recall their ambassadors from Madrid." After leaving the United States, he became rector of Spain's School of Diplomacy, holding that position until 1957 while remaining honorary director until his death in 1966.

== Personal life ==
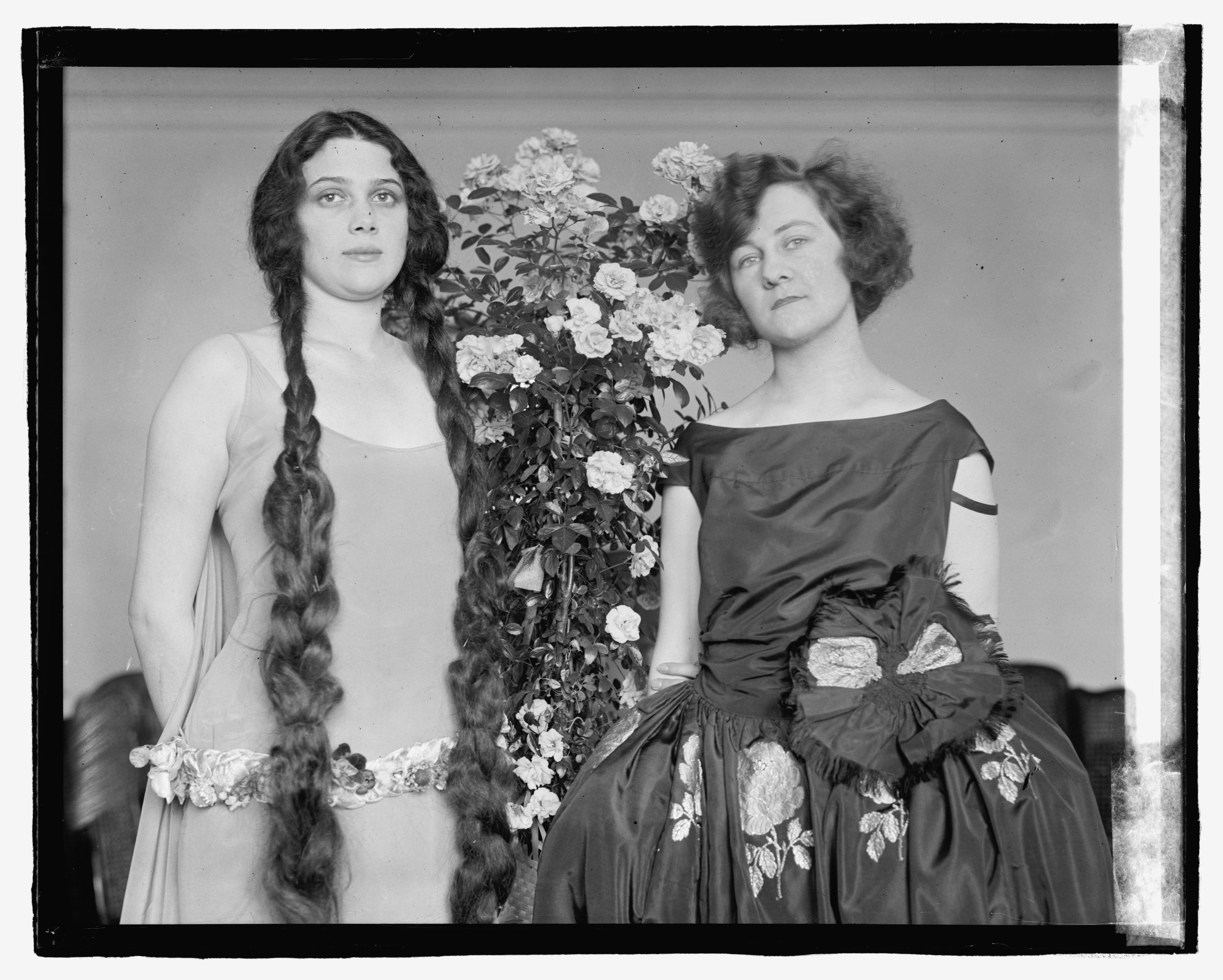
Photograph of Madame Nano and, Cárdenas' wife, Lucienne, c. 1923

On 27 June 1923, Cárdenas married Lucienne Nano, sister of Frederick Nano, the then secretary of the Romanian legation (who was later appointed Minister of Romania in the United States in 1926). His wife was considered "to be one of the most beautiful women in Washington".

Cárdenas died in Madrid on 16 January 1966. His funeral was held in Seville.

== Honours ==
- Grand Cross of the Order of Isabella the Catholic (1926)
- Grand Cross of the Most Distinguished Order of Charles III (1951)
