= The Spanish Settlements Within the Present Limits of the United States =

Two-volume history book

The Spanish Settlements Within the Present Limits of the United States is a two volume work by Woodbury Lowery chronicling Spanish exploration of the New World. The first volume, published in 1901, summarized the broader New World, and the second volume, published in 1905, is focused on the history of Florida. Lowery died before he could complete a third volume, but the two he published were generally positively received. The two volumes have been republished at least twice.

== Background ==
Woodbury Lowery (February 17, 1853 – April 11, 1906) was an American historian and author. Born in New York City, he had a career as a lawyer, practicing patent law, until 1897, when he became interested in Spanish-American history and quit his job to focus full time on that. His brother-in-law was the Spanish nobleman, José Brunetti, 15th Duke of Arcos. He spent ten years researching the two volume collection and died in Sicily doing further research. A later review of his work noted that "scholars presently studying Spain's empire in North America can mourn with Lowery's contemporaries that his work was interrupted."

== Publication and content ==
The Spanish Settlements within the Present Limits of the United States was published in 1901. The book summarizes Spanish exploration and colonization of the New World.

Lowery published a second volume, which focused exclusively on the history of Florida from 1562 to 1574, in 1905. Its first book is about French Florida and the second about Spanish Florida, including a lengthy character sketch of Pedro Menéndez de Avilés.

Both volumes were republished 1911 by Putnam and Sons and in 1959 by Russell & Russell.

== Reception ==
A contemporary reviewer of the first volume in The American Historical Review felt that the book would become a standard text on its subject and concluded that it was "readable and reliable". A review of the second volume published in the Southern History Association felt that Lowery had "done his work with thoroughness". A 1912 review of both volumes criticized the first as lacking consideration of economic and political issues in Spanish failure to colonize America. They felt that the second demonstrated "a much firmer grip" over the material.

In 1961 a reviewer in The Florida Historical Quarterly called the volumes "a work of nearly classic quality" and positively commented on its accessibility to scholars and everyday people. They positively commented on Lowery's "painstaking" efforts to ensure accuracy, balance of content, and style. They considered the work to offer new views including "assigning less importance to religion as a source of conflict" and its portrait of Menéndez de Avilés. The reviewer criticized some of Lowery's "moral judgments" as clouding "objective scholarship" and the complete lack of maps. The Journal of Southern History also published a review of the republished volumes that considered the reprinting "a valuable service to the scholarly world" and generally had favorable comments, but did note some errors and omissions.

== Legacy ==
In 1910, in honor of the Lowery, the Duke and Duchess of Arcos gave $20,000 to Harvard University "the income of which is to be used for research in history, preferably American history in the archives of foreign countries and more particularly in Spain." Upon her death, the Duchess left an additional $50,000 to Harvard to be added to the trust fund for the Woodbury Lowery fellowship.
