= Enrique Dupuy de Lôme =

Spanish ambassador

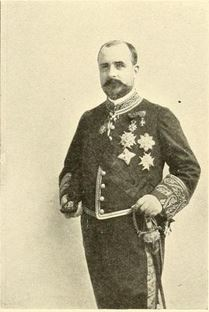
- Dupuy de Lôme c. 1895

Spanish Envoy Extraordinary and Minister Plenipotentiary to the United States
- In office July 29, 1883 – January 29, 1884 as Charge d'Affaires ad interim
- Monarch: Alfonso XII
- President: Chester A. Arthur
- Prime Minister: José Posada Herrera; Antonio Cánovas del Castillo
- Preceded by: Francisco Barea del Corral
- Succeeded by: Juan Valera y Alcalá-Galiano
- In office September 30, 1892 – March 2, 1893
- Monarch: Alfonso XIII
- President: Benjamin Harrison
- Prime Minister: Antonio Cánovas del Castillo; Práxedes Mateo Sagasta
- Preceded by: Jose Felipe Sagrario
- Succeeded by: Railie de Muruaga
- In office May 6, 1895 – February 11, 1898
- Monarch: Alfonso XIII
- President: Grover Cleveland; William McKinley
- Prime Minister: Antonio Cánovas del Castillo; Marcelo Azcárraga (acting); Práxedes Mateo Sagasta
- Preceded by: Jose Felipe Sagrario
- Succeeded by: Juan du Besu (as Charge d'Affaires)

Personal details
- Born: Valencia, Spain; August 23, 1851
- Died: July 1, 1904 (aged 52) Paris, France

Enrique Dupuy de Lôme y Paulín (August 23, 1851 – July 1, 1904) was a Spanish ambassador to the United States. In the De Lôme Letter, he mocked U.S. President William McKinley, attacked McKinley's policies, and regarded McKinley as a weak president. Cuban rebels intercepted the letter, and on February 9, 1898, the letter was published in U.S. newspapers. That contributed to the Spanish–American War, which started on April 25, 1898.

== Early life ==
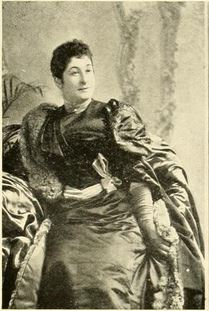
Mme. Dupuy de Lôme

Dupuy de Lôme was born in Valencia, the eldest son of Santiago Luis Dupuy de Lôme Guillemain and Isidra Paulín de la Pana de Belmonte. His father's family had moved to Spain from France after the French Revolution to work in the silk industry. His father settled in Valencia, where he was a politician, and silk and wine magnate.

His brother Carlos (1853–1921) was a silk industrialist and politician who was the Spanish consul in Paraguay and Bolivia. His brother Federico (1855–1924) was a military officer and politician. French naval engineer Henri Dupuy de Lôme was a cousin.

He studied at a boarding school in Mataro, as well as studied French in Paris. At 17, he began law school in Madrid.

== Career ==
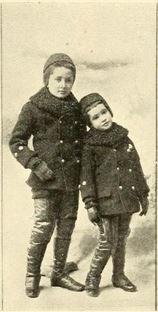
Sons of Enrique Dupuy de Lôme

He began his career as an orderly in the Foreign Ministry of Spain. In 1873, he was made part of the Spanish Legation in Japan. When he was recalled to Spain, he took a months-long return trip where he travelled throughout the United States, from San Francisco to New York.

Dupuy de Lôme was appointed Minister from Spain to the United States for the second time in May 1885. He was also Commissioner to the Columbian Exposition. His wife and the Duchess of Veragua represented the Queen Regent of Spain at this exposition. Dupuy de Lôme had large diplomatic experience, having represented his country in London, Paris, Berlin and Brussels. At all the legations, he was accompanied by his wife.

== Personal life ==
He married Adela Vidiella y Andreu of Cádiz when she was seventeen years of age, and most of her life from that point on was spent in foreign legations. Besides her native tongue, she spoke three other languages and was a good English scholar. Their two sons at the ages of nine and eleven, spoke four languages.

He died in Paris, aged 52.
