= De Lôme Letter =

1898 letter that played role in the Spanish–American War

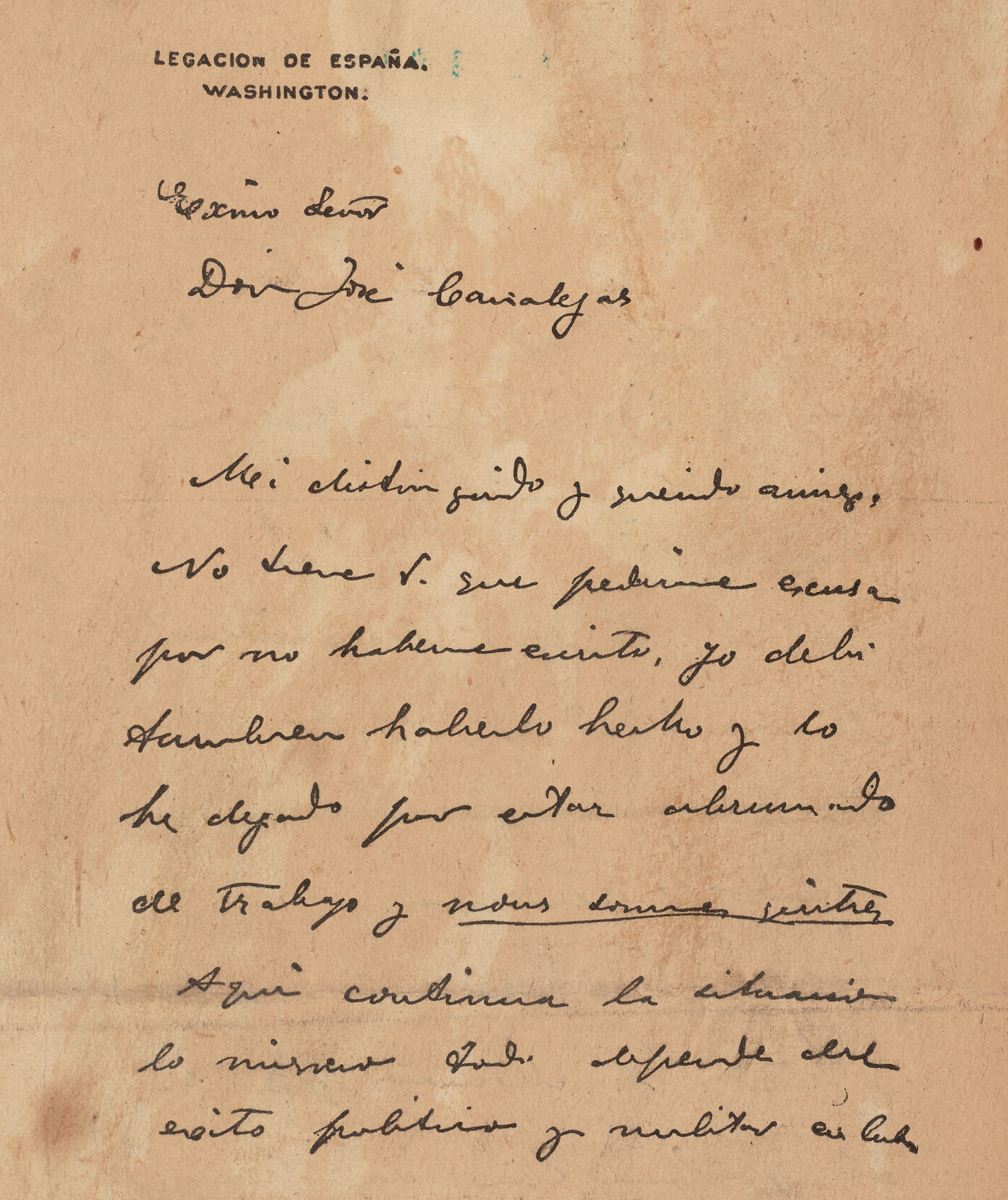
The first page of the De Lôme Letter.

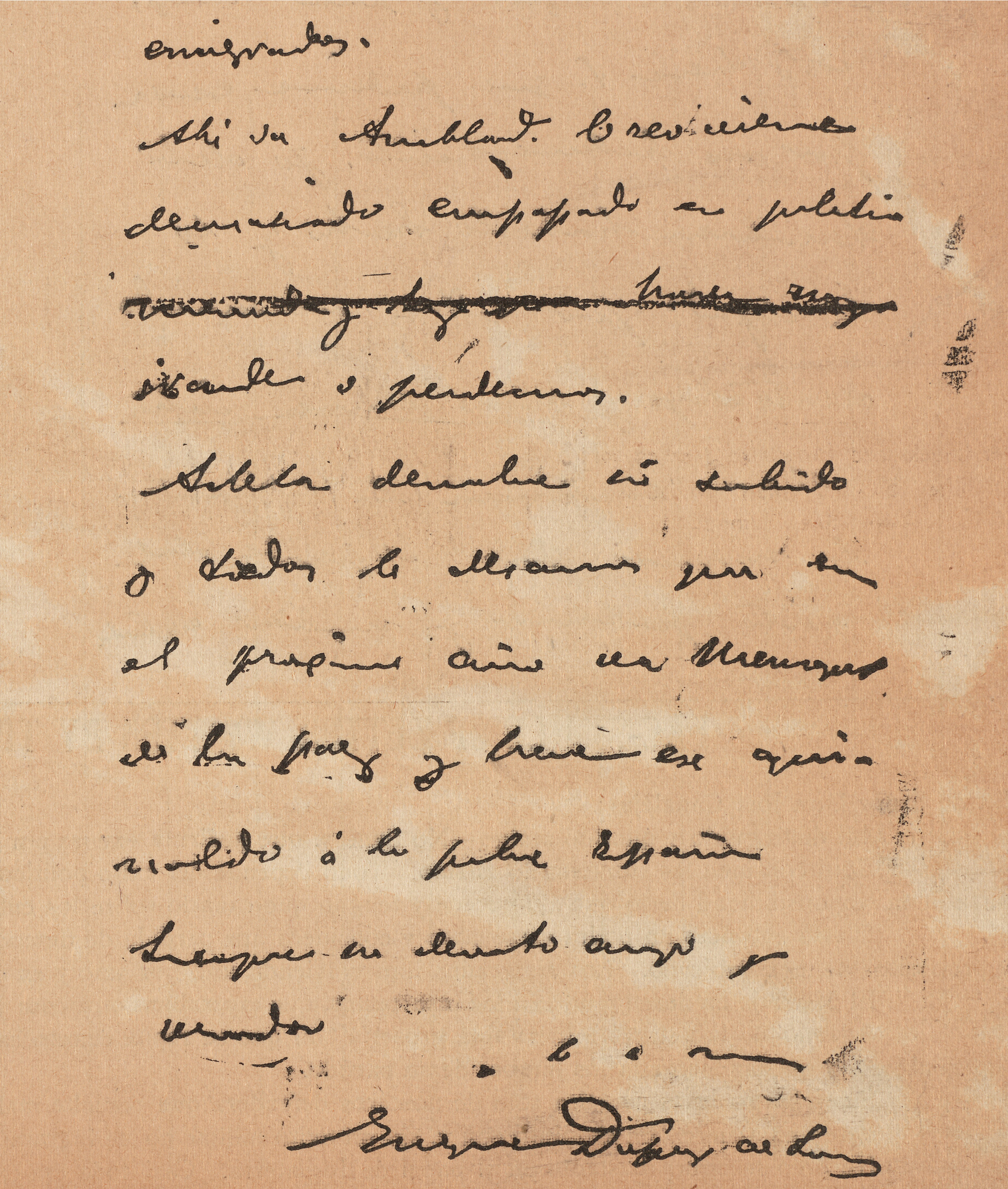
The last page of the letter.

The De Lôme Letter, a note written by Señor Don Enrique Dupuy de Lôme, the Spanish Ambassador to the United States, to Don José Canalejas y Méndez, the Foreign Minister of Spain, reveals de Lôme's opinion about the Spanish involvement in Cuba and US President McKinley’s diplomacy.

== Publication ==
Cuban revolutionaries intercepted the letter from the mail and released it to the Hearst press, which published it on February 9, 1898, in the New York Journal, in an article titled "Worst Insult to the United States in its History." Much of the press in New York began to demand De Lôme's resignation, and Hearst's New York Journal began a "Go Home De Lôme" campaign. These campaigns did, ultimately, lead to De Lôme's resignation. De Lôme's unflattering remarks about McKinley helped stoke the flames that would become the Spanish–American War. Two months later, on April 11, 1898, McKinley delivered a war message to Congress suggesting "forcible intervention" by the United States to establish peace in Cuba.

== See also ==
- Yellow journalism

== Sources ==
- Our Documents
- W.A. Swanberg, from Citizen Hearst: A biography of William Randolph Hearst: (Charles Scribner's Sons, 1961)
