= Ramón Gil-Casares =

Spanish diplomat (born 1953)

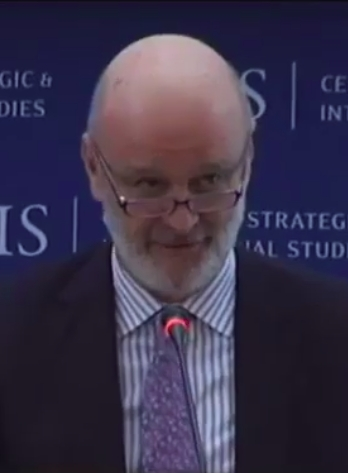
- Born: October 26, 1953 (age 72)
- Known for: Spanish diplomat

Ramón Gil-Casares (born October 26, 1953) is a Spanish diplomat who has served as Ambassador of Spain to the United States of America from April 2012 to April 2017.

External videos
- INT Spanish Ambassador Ramón Gil-Casares, Diplomaticconnection, February 2012, 35:34

He joined the Spanish diplomatic service in 1982, and served from 2005 to 2008 as the Spanish Ambassador to South Africa. Since 2002 to 2004, he served as the 5th Secretary of State for Foreign Affairs of the Government of Spain. 2008-2011 he was an advisor to the Directorate General of Foreign Policy for Africa. In February 2011, he became the Ambassador to Sudan, and when South Sudan gained independence 4 months later he was also appointed as ambassador to South Sudan.

From 2018 to 2022 he served as Ambassador of Spain to Egypt.
