= South Africa–Spain relations =

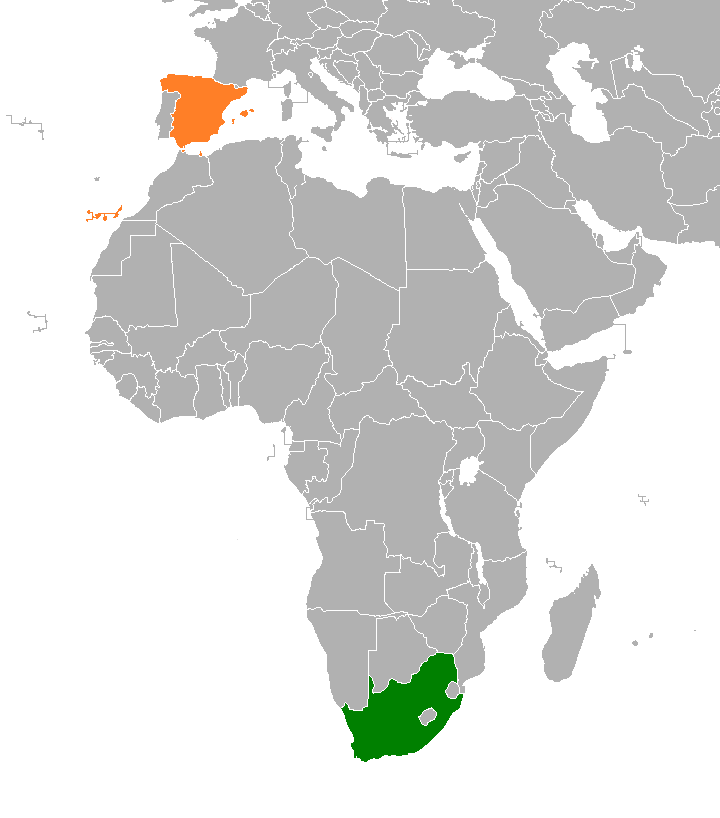
- South Africa: Spain

South Africa–Spain relations are the bilateral and diplomatic relations between these two countries. Both nations are members of the United Nations.

== Political relations ==
- 1990s - Spanish begins cooperation with South Africa as a preferred country in the first and second Master Plans.
- 2003 - Initiated annual bilateral consultations at the Secretary of State level.
- 2009 - South Africa loses its preferred status in the Spanish Cooperation Master Plan, leading to reduced bilateral cooperation.
- 2013 - Continued reduced bilateral cooperation, though regional efforts grew through support for NEPAD and the African World Heritage Fund.
- 2024 - Spain joins South Africa’s genocide case against Israel at the International Court of Justice (ICJ).

== Economic relations ==
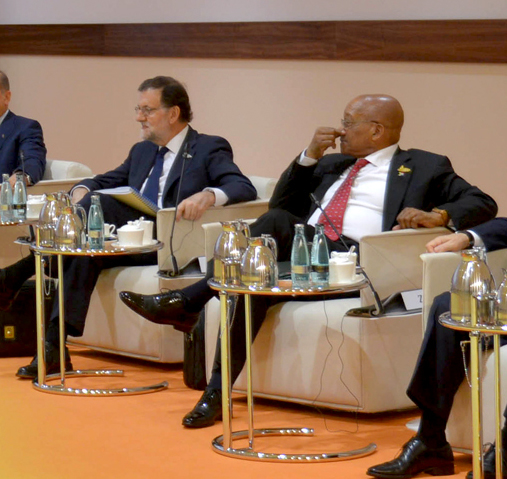
Presidents Mariano Rajoy and Jacob Zuma in the G20

- 2008 - Spain experiences a record trade deficit with South Africa of €935M.
- 2011 - Spanish-South African trade deficit reduced to €117M.
- 2012 - South Africa accounts for 61.3% of Spain’s exports to Sub-Saharan Africa.

== Resident diplomatic missions ==
- South Africa has an embassy in Madrid.
- Spain has an embassy in Pretoria and a consulate-general in Cape Town.

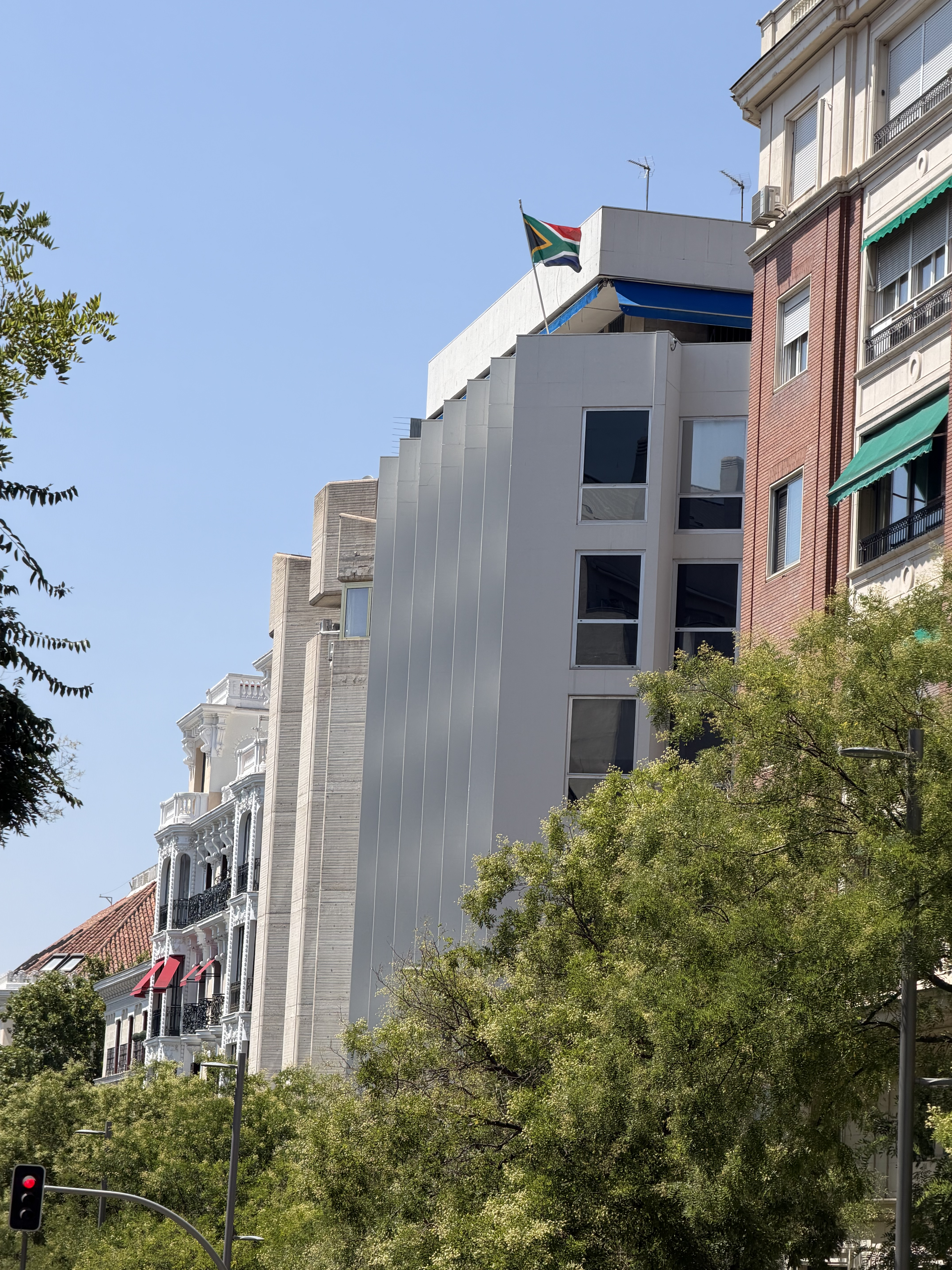
Embassy of South Africa in Madrid

== See also ==
- Foreign relations of South Africa
- Foreign relations of Spain
