= José María Doussinague =

Spanish diplomat

José María Doussinague y Teixidor (19 January 1894- 11 August 1967) was a Spanish diplomat. He was ambassador to Chile and served as general director of foreign policy at the ministry for foreign affairs during the Francoist dictatorship.

== Books ==
- Pedro de Valdivia, o la novela de Chile Madrid: Espasa-Calpe, 1963.
- Fernando el Católico y el Cisma de Pisa Madrid : Espasa-Calpe, 1946
- Un Proceso por Envenenamiento : La muerte de Felipe el Hermoso Madrid : Espasa-Calpe, 1947
- La política internacional de Fernando el Católico Madrid : Espasa-Calpe, 1944
- La política exterior de España en el siglo XVI Madrid: Ministerio de Asuntos Exteriores, 1949.
- España tenía razón (1939-1945) Madrid, Espasa Calpe, 1949.
- "Diplomacia y quijotismo" Escorial 17 (1944–1945)
- Ignacio de Loyola y Jerónimo de Zurita Congreso de Historia de la Corona de Aragón (7º. 1962. Barcelona): pp. 41–54.
