= Juan Riaño y Gayangos =

Spanish diplomat

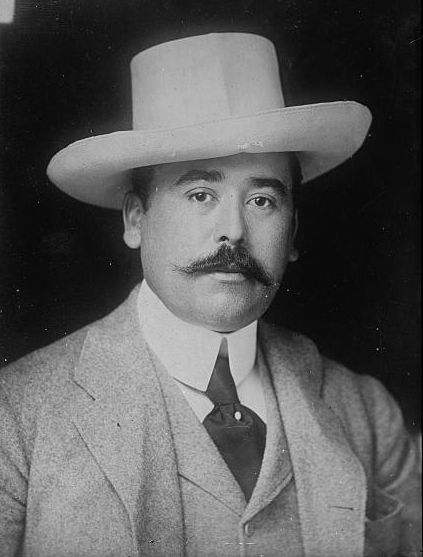
Juan Riaño y Gayangos

Juan Riaño y Gayangos (March 24, 1865 – November 18, 1939) was a Spanish diplomat. He served as ambassador to the United States from 1914 until 1926 and had been Dean of the Diplomatic Corps from February 1925 to August 1926.

He was married in 1904 to Alice Ward, a Washington, D.C. socialite and heiress.
