= Marquess of Alventos =

Spanish peerage

Marquessate of Alventos
- Creation date: 24 February 1761
- Created by: Philip V
- Peerage: Peerage of Spain
- First holder: José de Rojas y Contreras, 1st Marquess of Alventos
- Present holder: Manuel de Medina y Echevarría, 9th Marquess of Alventos

Marquess of Alventos (Spanish: Marqués de Alventos) is a hereditary title in the Peerage of Spain, granted in 1761 by Philip V to José de Rojas, veintiquatro of Seville and knight of the Order of Calatrava.

== Marquesses of Alventos (1761) ==
- José de Rojas y Contreras, 1st Marquess of Alventos
- Antonio de Rojas y Prieto, 2nd Marquess of Alventos
- José María de Rojas y Ponce de León, 3rd Marquess of Alventos
- Antonio de Rojas y Aguado, 4th Marquess of Alventos
- Ricardo de Rojas y Porres, 5th Marquess of Alventos
- José María de Rojas y Ezpeleta, 6th Marquess of Alventos
- Narcisa de Rojas y Brieva, 7th Marchioness of Alventos
- Alfonso de Medina y Rojas, 8th Marquess of Alventos
- Manuel de Medina y Echevarría, 9th Marquess of Alventos

== See also ==
- Spanish nobility
