= Merry del Val =

Merry del Val is a Spanish surname and may refer to:

== People ==
- Alfonso Merry del Val (1864–1943), Spanish diplomat, son of Rafael Carlos Merry del Val and father of Alfonso Merry del Val y Alzola
- Alfonso Merry del Val y Alzola (1903–1975), Spanish diplomat, son of Alfonso Merry del Val
- Rafael Merry del Val (1865–1930), Spanish Catholic bishop, Vatican official, and cardinal, son of Rafael Carlos Merry del Val
- Rafael Carlos Merry del Val (1831–1917), Spanish nobleman and diplomat, father of Alfonso Merry del Val

== Peerage ==
- Marquess of Merry del Val, a hereditary title in the Peerage of Spain

== See also ==
- Del Val, Spanish surname
