= Alfonso Merry del Val y Alzola =

Spanish career diplomat

His Excellency The Marquess of Merry del Val

Spanish Ambassador to Japan
- In office 1970 – July 1973
- Preceded by: Luis García de Llera y Rodríguez
- Succeeded by: Joaquín Gutiérrez Cano

Spanish Ambassador to the United States
- In office 21 April 1964 – 26 January 1970
- Preceded by: Antonio Garrigues Díaz-Cañabate
- Succeeded by: Jaime Arguelles

Spanish Ambassador to Peru
- In office 21 September 1960 – 16 March 1964
- Preceded by: Mariano de Yturralde y Orbegoso
- Succeeded by: Ángel Sanz Briz

Spanish Ambassador to Lebanon
- In office 1958–1960
- Succeeded by: Emilio García Gómez

Spanish Ambassador to Denmark
- In office 1957–1958

Spanish Ambassador to the Dominican Republic
- In office 1954–1956
- Preceded by: Manuel Valdés Larrañaga
- Succeeded by: Alfredo Sánchez Bella

Personal details
- Born: Alfonso Merry del Val y Alzola; 24 July 1903 Bilbao, Spain
- Died: 8 January 1975 (aged 71) San Sebastián, Basque, Spain
- Spouse(s): María del Carmen de Gurtubay y Alzola (m. 1931, annulled) Mercedes de Ocio y Ureta
- Relations: Rafael Carlos Merry del Val (grandfather); Rafael Merry del Val (uncle)
- Parent(s): Alfonso Merry del Val; María de Alzola y González de Castejón
- Education: University of Valladolid

Alfonso Merry del Val y Alzola, 2nd Marquess of Merry del Val (24 July 1903 – 8 January 1975) was a Spanish career diplomat.

== Early life ==
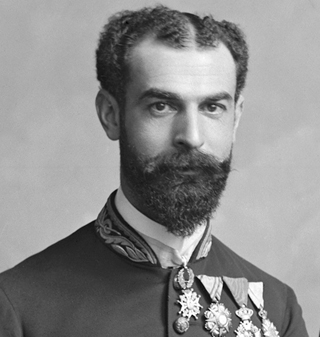
Photograph of his father, at Queen Victoria's Diamond Jubilee, 24 June 1897

Merry del Val was born in Bilbao on 24 July 1903. He was the eldest son of María de Alzola y González de Castejón and Alfonso Merry del Val, the Spanish Ambassador to the United Kingdom from 1913 to 1931. His younger brother, Pablo Merry del Val y Alzola, was the Chief Liaison Officer for the foreign press under Franco.

His paternal grandparents were Sofía Josefa de Zulueta (a daughter of the 2nd Count of Torre Díaz) and Rafael Carlos Merry del Val, a career diplomat who served as Spanish Ambassador to Belgium and to the Holy See and Minister at the Imperial Court of Vienna. Among his extended family was uncle Rafael Merry del Val, who became Cardinal Secretary of State to Pope Pius X. His maternal grandparents were María de las Mercedes González de Castejón y Torre and Don Pablo de Alzola y Minondo, a chamberlain to the King of Spain who was a member of the Senate of Spain,

He graduated with a law degree from the University of Valladolid, but also studied at the Universities of Deusto, Oxford and Cambridge.

== Career ==
Merry del Val joined the Spanish diplomatic service in 1928. He served as Secretary of the Legation in London in 1929 (while his father was the Spanish Ambassador), Consul in Prague in 1930, in the Private Secretariat of King Alfonso XIII, and in Washington in 1931.

He served as Minister-Counselor in the Spanish embassy in Lima in 1953, he was Ambassador in Santo Domingo, Copenhagen, Beirut, Lima. On 7 March 1964, he was announced as the new Spanish Ambassador to the United States in Washington, D.C. He presented his credentials to President Lyndon B. Johnson at the White House in May 1964, and served there until 1970 when he became Ambassador to Japan. While Merry del Val was in Washington, he was "one of the most socially sought after Ambassadors" and the Spanish embassy was located at 2700 15th St. N.W.

=== Peerage and honours ===
Upon the death of his father in 1943, he succeeded as the 2nd Marqués de Merry del Val. For his diplomatic work, he was awarded numerous national and foreign decorations, including Medal of the Campaign, Knight Grand Cross of the Order of Isabella the Catholic, Knight of the Order of Charles III, Grand Cross of Military Merit, Grand Cross of Naval Merit.

== Personal life ==
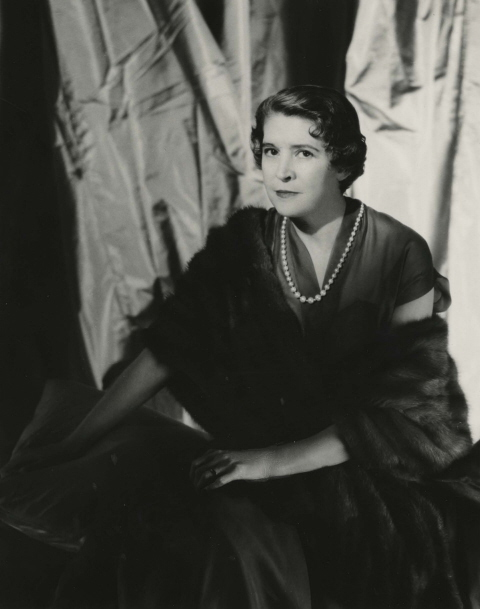
Photograph of his first wife, Carmen de Gurtubay y Alzola, Marquesa de Yurreta y Gamboa

In 1931, Merry del Val married his second cousin, María del Carmen de Gurtubay y Alzola, 2nd Marchioness of Yurreta y Gamboa (1910–1959), the only child of Juan Gurtubay y González de Castejón and Blanca de Alzola, 1st Marquesa of Yurreta and Gamboa (after her father's death her mother married Don José de Bustos y Ruiz de Araña Bustos, Duke of Andría). They divorced and the marriage was annulled by Papal decree. She then married Ángel Fernández de Liencres, Marquis of Nájera, in 1936. In 1948, she married John McKee-Norton, a Canadian living in England, whom she met at the Hôtel Ritz Paris.

He later married Mercedes de Ocio y Ureta, a daughter of Zoilo Enrique de Ocio y López de Haro (1908–1994).

The Marquess of Merry del Val died in San Sebastián on 8 January 1975. As he had no surviving issue, his nephew, Rafael Merry del Val y Melgarejo, became the 3rd Marquess of Merry del Val.

Diplomatic posts
Preceded by Antonio Garrigues Díaz-Cañabate	Spanish Ambassador to the United States; 1964–1970	Succeeded by Jaime Arguelles
Preceded by Luis García de Llera y Rodríguez	Spanish Ambassador to Japan; 1970–1973	Succeeded by Joaquín Gutiérrez Cano
Spanish nobility
Preceded by Alfonso Merry del Val	Marquess of Merry del Val; 1943–1975	Succeeded by Rafael Merry del Val y Melgarejo
