= Alfonso Merry del Val =

Spanish diplomat

The Most Excellent The Marquess of Merry del Val GCVO CvNSC
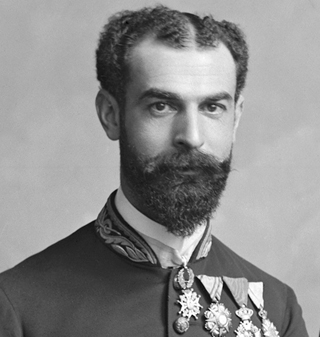
- Merry del Val at Queen Victoria's Diamond Jubilee, 24 June 1897

Spanish Ambassador to the United Kingdom
- In office April 1913 – 18 April 1931
- Preceded by: The Marquis of Villa-Urrutia
- Succeeded by: Ramón Pérez de Ayala

Personal details
- Born: Alfonso Merry del Val y Zulueta; 20 April 1864 Marylebone, London, England
- Died: 27 May 1943 (aged 79) San Sebastián, Basque, Spain
- Spouse: María de Alzola y González de Castejón (m. 1901; died 1943)
- Relations: Rafael Merry del Val (brother); Pedro José de Zulueta, 2nd Count of Torre Díaz (grandfather)
- Children: Alfonso Merry del Val y Alzola
- Parent(s): Rafael Carlos Merry del Val; Sofía Josefa de Zulueta
- Education: Beaumont College

Alfonso Merry del Val y Zulueta, 1st Marquess of Merry del Val GCVO CvNSC (20 April 1864 – 27 May 1943) was a Spanish diplomat.

== Early life ==
Merry del Val was born on 20 April 1864 at 59 Queen Anne Street in Marylebone, London. He was the eldest of four sons born to Sofía Josefa de Zulueta (1839–1925) and Rafael Carlos Merry del Val. Among his younger siblings, all of whom were born in London, was Rafael Merry del Val, who became Cardinal Secretary of State to Pope Pius X. His father was a career diplomat who served as Spanish Ambassador to Belgium and to the Holy See and Minister at the Imperial Court of Vienna, and Gentlemen of the Bedchamber to Queen Isabella II and Kings Alfonso XII and Alfonso XII.

His father's family were descendants of a noble Irish family, originally from County Waterford, that settled in Seville in the 18th century. His maternal grandparents were Pedro José de Zulueta, 2nd Count of Torre Díaz, and the former Sophie Anne Willcox (daughter of Brodie McGhie Willcox, MP for Southampton). Through his maternal uncle, Brodie Manuel de Zulueta, 3rd Conde de Torre Díaz, he was a first cousin of Alfonso Maria de Zulueta, 4th Count of Torre Díaz. Through another uncle, Pedro Juan de Zulueta, he was a first cousin of Francisco Maria José de Zulueta, the Regius Professor of Civil Law at the University of Oxford.

Merry del Val studied at various Jesuit colleges, first in Bournemouth, then at Beaumont College, until his family moved to Namur and Brussels in Belgium. In 1880 he entered the Catholic University of Louvain, graduating in 1884.

== Career ==
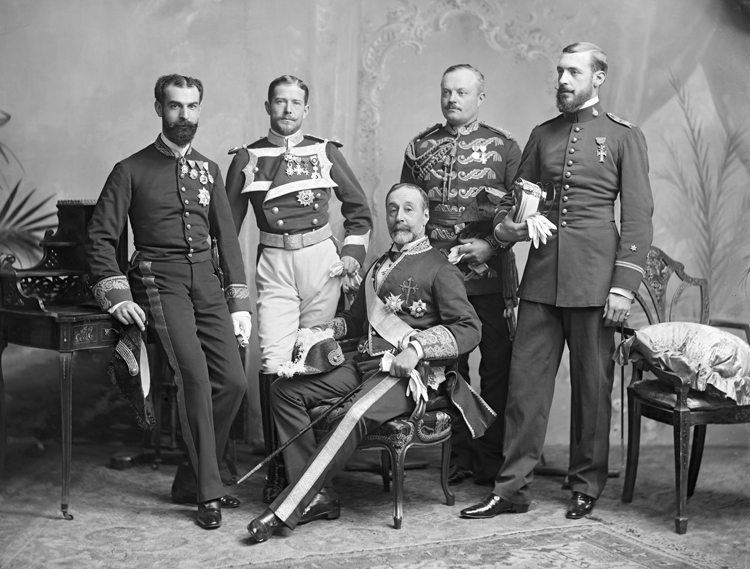
Merry del Val, far left, at Queen Victoria's Diamond Jubilee, 24 June 1897

In 1882 he entered the diplomatic career during the Restoration, and his first assignment was in Brussels as an attaché to the embassy of which his father was head. In the early part of the 20th century, he taught English to the young King Alfonso XIII, then became his personal assistant. From then on, and throughout his life, he was closely affiliated with the King.

In 1908, he was appointed Minister Plenipotentiary in Tangier with the difficult task of resolving the conflicts caused by the activities of the Spanish Rif Mines Company and the claims of independence of Sultan Mulay Hafid. The failure of his mission and the subsequent outbreak of the Melilla War in 1909 brought instability to Spanish politics. After the events of the Tragic Week in Barcelona, the government of Prime Minister Antonio Maura fell, and Merry del Val was replaced by Luis Valera, the Marquess of Villasinda.

He was assigned again to Brussels, where he remained until April 1913 when he was appointed Ambassador to the United Kingdom, replacing the Marquess of Villa-Urrutia. His Anglophile tendencies and his familiarity with the British language, culture and high society greatly facilitated his mission at the Court of George V, marked by good relations between both monarchies. Following Irish independence in 1922, he negotiated the establishment of diplomatic relations between Spain and the new Irish Free State. He remained in London until he resigned in 1931, following the proclamation of the Second Republic after the deposition of King Alfonso XIII. He was replaced by the writer Ramón Pérez de Ayala, who was in favor with the new regime. He retired to Biarritz.

In 1936, at the outbreak of the Civil War, he left Spain and returned to London. In 1938, he negotiated with the British authorities the recognition of the Government at Burgos, acting alongside the Duke of Alba as unofficial representative of Gen. Francisco Franco. The Second Republic was eventually dissolved in 1939 after surrendering in the Spanish Civil War to the Nationalists led by Franco.

=== Honours ===
On 16 March 1913, he was invested as a Knight Grand Cross of the Royal Victorian Order. In 1925, King Alfonso XIII elevated him to the Peerage of Spain as the Marquess of Merry del Val. He was also made a Knight of the Order of the Immaculate Conception of Vila Viçosa by King Manuel II of Portugal, corresponding academician of the Royal Academy of History and was awarded an honorary doctorate from the Universities of Oxford and Cambridge.

== Personal life ==
In 1901, Merry del Val married María de Alzola y González de Castejón (1879–1959) in Bilbao. She was a daughter of Don Pablo de Alzola y Minondo, a chamberlain to the King who was a member of the Senate of Spain, and María de las Mercedes González de Castejón y Torre. While in England, Maria was a friend of diarist Henry Channon. Together, they were the parents of two children:

- Alfonso Merry del Val y Alzola, 2nd Marquess of Merry del Val (1903–1975), who was also a diplomat serving as the Spanish Ambassador to the United States and Japan; he married his cousin, María del Carmen de Gurtubay y Alzola, Marchioness of Yurreta y Gamboa. They divorced and he married Mercedes de Ocio y Ureta.
- Pablo Merry del Val y Alzola, the Chief Liaison Officer for the foreign press under Franco; he married María Melgarejo y Heredia.

The Marquess died on 27 May 1943 in San Sebastián.

Diplomatic posts
Preceded by The Marquis of Villa-Urrutia	Spanish Ambassador to the United Kingdom; 1913–1931	Succeeded by Ramón Pérez de Ayala
Spanish nobility
Preceded by Created	Marquess of Merry del Val; 1925–1943	Succeeded by Alfonso Merry del Val y Alzola
