= Marquess of Merry del Val =

Marquessate of Merry del Val
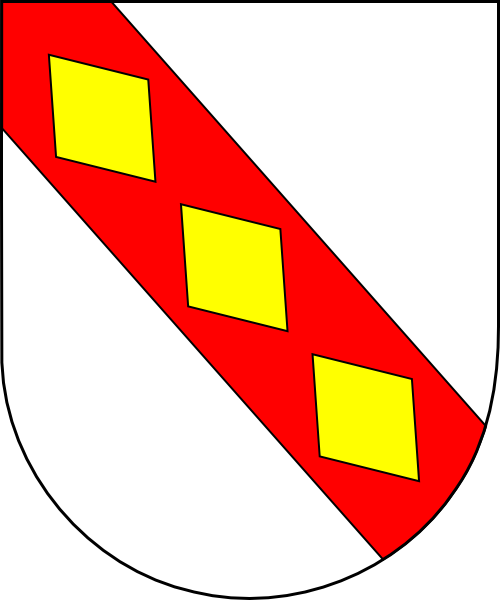
- Creation date: 15 August 1925
- Created by: Alfonso XIII
- Peerage: Peerage of Spain
- First holder: Alfonso Merry del Val
- Present holder: Rafael Merry del Val y Roca de Togores
- Subsidiary titles: Count of Valle de San Juan

Marquess of Merry del Val (Spanish: Marqués de Merry del Val) is a hereditary title in the Peerage of Spain, granted in 1925 by King Alfonso XIII to diplomat Alfonso Merry del Val.

== History ==
The family's surname, Merry del Val, was formed by combining the surnames of the 1st Marquess's paternal grandparents: Rafael Merry y Gayte and María de la Trinidad del Val Gómez. The Merrys were the Irish noble family, originally from County Waterford, that settled in Seville in the 18th century. Those of the Val were a noble lineage from the Kingdom of Aragon, originally from Zaragoza.

The parents of the 1st Marquess were Sofía Josefa de Zulueta (1839–1925), (Note: Sofía Josefa de Zulueta (1839–1925) was the eldest daughter of Pedro José de Zulueta, 2nd Count of Torre Díaz, and the former Sophie Anne Willcox (daughter of Brodie McGhie Willcox, Liberal MP for Southampton who was the co-founder of P&O, one of the United Kingdom's largest shipping businesses).) and Rafael Carlos Merry del Val (1831–1917), a career diplomat who served as the Spanish Ambassador to Belgium, to the Holy See, and Minister at the Imperial Court of Vienna, and Gentlemen of the Bedchamber to Queen Isabella II and Kings Alfonso XII and Alfonso XII. The 1st Marquess served as Spanish Ambassador to the United Kingdom from 1913 until 1931. The younger brother of the 1st Marquess was Rafael Merry del Val (1865–1930), who became Cardinal Secretary of State to Pope Pius X. The 2nd Marquess served as the Spanish Ambassador to the United States, among other countries. As the 2nd Marquess died without issue, he was succeeded by his nephew, Rafael Merry del Val y Melgarajeo, son of the 2nd Marquess's younger brother Pablo, whose children inherited the title Count of Valle de San Juan.

== Marquesses of Merry del Val (1925) ==
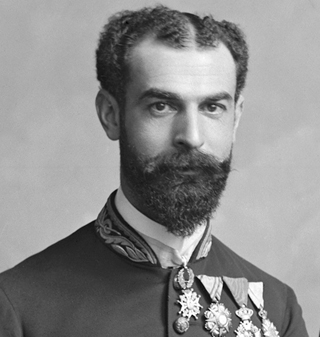
The 1st Marquess of Merry del Val, at Queen Victoria's Diamond Jubilee, 24 June 1897

- Alfonso Merry del Val y de Zulueta, 1st Marquess of Merry del Val (1864–1943)
- Alfonso Merry del Val y Alzola, 2nd Marquess of Merry del Val (1903–1975)
- Rafael Merry del Val y Melgarejo, 3rd Marquess of Merry del Val (d. 2004)
- Rafael Merry del Val y Roca de Togores, 4th Marquess of Merry del Val (b. 1964)

== Line of descent ==
- Rafael Carlos Merry del Val (1831–1917) m. Sofía Josefa de Zulueta
  - Alfonso Merry del Val y de Zulueta, 1st Marquess of Merry del Val (1864–1943); m. María de Alzola y González de Castejón
    - Alfonso Merry del Val y Alzola, 2nd Marquess of Merry del Val (1903–1975); m. (1) Carmen de Gurtubay y Alzola, 2nd Marchioness of Yurreta y Gamboa; m. (2) Mercedes de Ocio y Ureta
    - Pablo Merry del Val y Alzola, Count of Valle de San Juan; m. María Melgarejo y Heredia
      - Rafael Merry del Val y Melgarejo, 3rd Marquess of Merry del Val (d. 2004); m. Maria Teresa Roca de Togores y Bustos
        - Rafael Merry del Val y Roca de Togores, 4th Marquess of Merry del Val (b. 1964); m. Sofía Figueroa Alcázar
  - Rafael Merry del Val y de Zulueta (1865–1930)

== See also ==
- Count of Torre Díaz
- Count of Valle de San Juan
