= Carmen de Gurtubay =

Spanish noblewoman

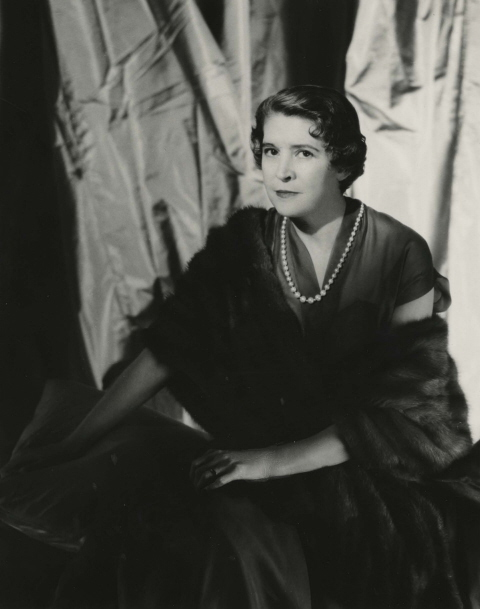
- Born: 4 June 1910; Madrid, Spain
- Died: 23 January 1959 (aged 48); Paris, France
- Resting place: Montparnasse Cemetery
- Spouses: Alfonso Merry del Val y Alzola (m. 1931, divorced) Ángel Fernández de Liencres (m. 1936, divorced) John McKee-Norton (m. 1948; died 1959)
- Children: Jane Fernández de Liencres y Gurtubay
- Parent(s): Juan Gurtubay y González de Castejón; Blanca de Alzola, 1st Marquesa of Yurreta and Gamboa
- Relatives: María del Rosario de Silva, Duchess of Alba (cousin)

María del Carmen Gurtubay y Alzola, 2nd Marchioness of Yurreta and Gamboa (Spanish: María del Carmen Gurtubay y Alzola, 2nd Marquesa of Yurreta y Gamboa) (4 June 1910 – 23 January 1959) was a Spanish noblewoman who served as a spy during World War II.

== Early life ==
She was born in Madrid on 4 June 1910, the only child of Juan Gurtubay y González de Castejón and Blanca de Alzola, 1st Marquesa of Yurreta and Gamboa. Yurreta refers to a town in the Vizcaya province of the Basque Country in Northern Spain. Following her father's death her mother remarried on April 15, 1920 don José de Bustos y Ruiz de Araña Bustos, Duke of Andría.

== Career ==
Carmen's early life, like much of the pre-civil war aristocracy, was a round of parties and vacations moving between the capital, their country estates and fashionable European resorts. She was however a keen sportswoman, being both an expert rider and notable golfer. Her cousin, María del Rosario de Silva y Gurtubay, married Jacobo Fitz-James Stuart, 17th Duke of Alba, and was the mother of the late Duchess of Alba, Cayetana Fitz-James Stuart y Silva. So Carmen was a member of the richest echelons of Spanish society.

She soon became aware of the appalling divide between her own class and the ordinary working people of Spain. She became a convinced socialist and was active in the nascent Republican movement. On the eve of the Spanish Civil War she escaped from Barcelona to France where she lived in exile until her death. During her years in Paris she continued to work for the Republican cause.

Some of the correspondence of Manuel de Irujo, Republican Minister in exile in London until 1945 then in Paris, is held at the Euskomeida Fundazioa in the Basque Country. There are letters from Carmen and others in which de Irujo refers to her efforts for the Republican cause.

=== Autobiography ===
Encouraged by Jenny Bradley of the W. A. Bradley Literary Agency, she wrote an autobiography, which her mother, the Duchess of Andría, tried to have suppressed after Carmen's death. Her story still remains unpublished.

== Personal life ==
In 1931, she married her cousin Alfonso Merry del Val y Alzola (later Marquess of Merry del Val). They divorced and the marriage was annulled by Papal decree. His uncle was Cardinal Rafael Merry del Val, Papal Secretary of State until 1914, and Secretary of the Holy Office (formerly the Holy Office of the Inquisition) until his unexpected death from complications following appendicitis in 1930.

On 4 July 1936 she married Ángel Fernández de Liencres, 4th Marqués de Nájera, 12th Viscount of Sancho Miranda (1896-1984) in Las Palmas. Before they divorced, they were the parents of:

- Jane Fernández de Liencres y Gurtubay (b. 1937).

On 24 February 1948 she married John McKee-Norton, a Canadian expatriate living in England whom she met in the bar of the Hôtel Ritz Paris. In his memoirs John McKee-Norton states: I was interested, confused and intrigued, at this little Spanish woman, with the dark flashing eyes, and beautiful bony hands, with long red finger nails, like rubies.

Carmen died in Paris in January 1959, where her remains are interred in the Montparnasse Cemetery. McKee-Norton died in Northampton, UK on 27 October 2009.

== Legacy ==
In June 1997 the U.S. House of Representatives Eizenstat Report into Nazi looting of Gold and Art Works during World War II refers to a report submitted by Carmen to the U.S. Ambassador in Paris, and states that: Carmen de Gurtubay was a very high placed Allied intelligence agent who risked her life both in Portugal and Spain during the war years. She was jailed several times at the behest of German agents, who basically had influenced the Portuguese and Spanish police to act on their behalf.

In his book, Franco and the Axis Stigma, David Wingeate Pike refers to Carmen's investigation into the number of Germans in Spain in 1946, which she estimated at between 100,000 and 500,000 including 6,000 scientists and technicians.
