= Pedro José de Zulueta, 2nd Count of Torre Díaz =

Spanish politician, aristocrat and banker

Pedro José de Zulueta y Madariaga, 2nd Count of Torre Díaz (18 October 1809 – 3 March 1882) was a Spanish politician and aristocrat who became a banker in London.

== Early life ==
Zulueta was born in Cádiz, Andalucía on 18 October 1809. He was the eldest son of Josefa Madariaga Ceballos (a daughter of Juana Josefa Ceballos) and Spanish merchant and deputy in the Spanish Cortes, Don Pedro Juan de Zulueta (1784–1855), who was created the 1st Count of Torre Díaz by Queen Isabella II of Spain in 1846. Among his siblings was brother Antonio de Zulueta.

The de Zulueta family was an ancient Catholic Basque family from the Pamplona region of Northern Spain, who trace their genealogical ancestry back at the least by 700 years including participating in the Battle of Las Navas de Tolosa in 1212, an important turning point in the Reconquista and the medieval history of Spain. When the government collapsed in 1823, the Zulueta family was among liberal exiles who went to London where his father established the trading house of Zulueta & Co. in 1823, becoming an agent of the Spanish Government.

== Career ==
After the slaves in Haiti were freed in 1794 following the French Revolution, the slave owners settled in Cuba where slavery boomed at the beginning of the 19th century. His father's firm, Zulueta & Co., was involved along with his cousin, Julián de Zulueta, 1st Marquis of Álava, before the slave trade was abolished there as well in 1825.

After King Ferdinand VII's death in 1833, his father was back in favour in Spain and was made Count of Torre Díaz in 1846. De Zulueta was a chamberlain and Gentleman of the Bedchamber to Francisco de Asís, Duke of Cádiz, the King consort of Spain, and a member of the Senate of Spain until the Revolution in 1868. After the Glorious Revolution, he established the London bank of Zulueta & Co.

== Personal life ==
In 1836, de Zulueta was married to Sophie Anne Willcox, a daughter of Brodie McGhie Willcox, MP for Southampton. Together, they lived at 21 Devonshire Place, London and were the parents of:

- Sofía Josefa de Zulueta (1839–1925), who married Rafael Carlos Merry del Val, Marquess of Merry del Val, secretary to the Spanish legation in London, who was a monarchist supporter of Alfonso XII.
- Brodie Manuel de Zulueta, 3rd Conde de Torre Díaz (1842–1918), who married Constance Petre, a daughter of the Hon. Frederick Petre (a son of the 11th Baron Petre), in 1873. After her death, he married Hon. Bertha Clifford, a daughter of Charles Clifford, 8th Baron Clifford of Chudleigh, in 1892.
- Pedro Juan José de Zulueta (c. 1847–1908), a diplomat who married Laura Sheil, a daughter of Sir Justin Sheil.
- Francisco de Zulueta, a Jesuit priest.

The Count of Torre Díaz died on 3 March 1882 in London. He was succeeded by his eldest surviving son, Brodie.

=== Descendants ===
Through his eldest daughter Sofía, he was a grandfather of four, including Alfonso Merry del Val, Marquess of Merry del Val (1864–1943), who became the Spanish Ambassador to the United Kingdom, and Rafael Merry del Val (1865–1930), who became Cardinal Secretary of State.

Through his eldest son Brodie, he was a grandfather of Alfonso Maria de Zulueta, 4th Count of Torre Díaz (1874–1951); Inés de Zulueta; Dolores de Zulueta and Angela de Zulueta.

Through his son Pedro Juan, he was a grandfather of Francisco Maria José de Zulueta (1878–1958), the Regius Professor of Civil Law at the University of Oxford from 1919 until 1948.
