= Count of Torre Díaz =

Countship of Torre Díaz
- Creation date: 14 April 1846
- Created by: Isabella II
- Peerage: Peerage of Spain
- First holder: Pedro Juan de Zulueta, 1st Count of Torre Díaz
- Present holder: Pablo de Zulueta y Browing, 6th Count of Torre Diaz

The Counts of Torre Díaz (Spanish: Conde de Torre Díaz) is a hereditary title in the Peerage of Spain and granted in 1846 by Isabella II to Don Pedro Juan de Zulueta.

== History ==
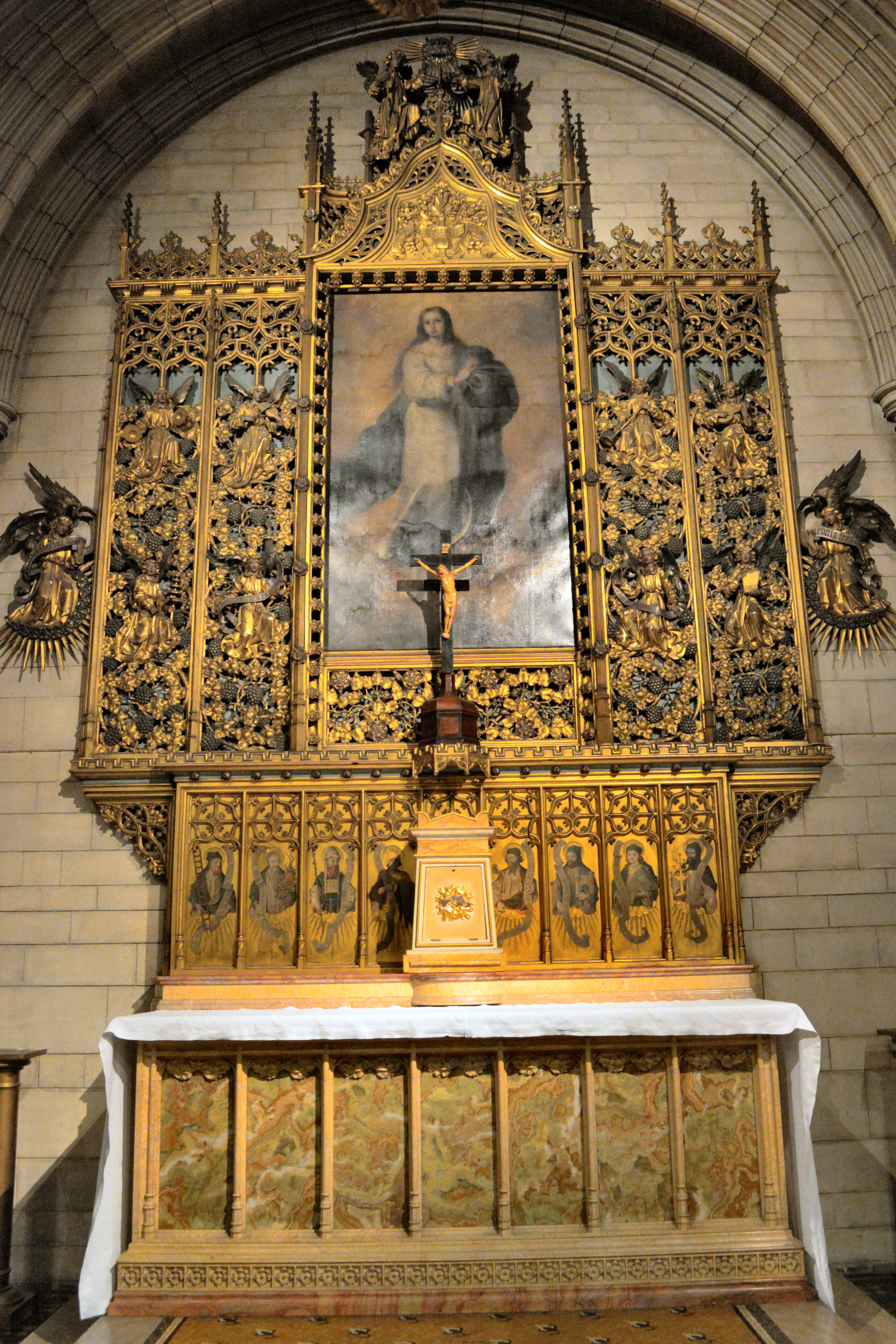
The Lady Chapel at St James's, Spanish Place, has an altar of various coloured marbles, a predella with nine Old Testament figures, and a carved and gilded altarpiece framing a copy of Murillo's painting of the Immaculate Conception, presented by Count de Torre Díaz.

The de Zulueta family is an ancient Catholic Basque family from the Pamplona region of Northern Spain, who trace their genealogical ancestry back at the least by 700 years including participating in the Battle of Las Navas de Tolosa in 1212, an important turning point in the Reconquista and the medieval history of Spain.

The hereditary rank and title, Count of Torre Díaz, was conferred on Spanish merchant Don Pedro Juan de Zulueta by Queen Isabella II of Spain in 1846. The 2nd Count, a chamberlain to the King of Spain and a member of the Senate of Spain until the Revolution in 1868, married Sophie Anne Willcox, daughter of Brodie McGhie Willcox, MP for Southampton, and established the London bank of Zulueta & Co. Sofia Josefa de Zulueta, a daughter of the 2nd Count, married Rafael Carlos Merry del Val and was the mother of Cardinal Rafael Merry del Val. The 3rd Count, was married to Constance, daughter of the Hon. Frederick Petre (a son of the 11th Baron Petre) and, secondly, to Hon. Bertha Clifford, a daughter of Charles Clifford, 8th Baron Clifford of Chudleigh. The 5th Count was a Roman Catholic canon who served as rector of Holy Redeemer Church, Chelsea.

=== Counts of Torre Díaz (1846) ===
- Pedro Juan de Zulueta, 1st Count of Torre Díaz (1784–1855)
- Pedro José de Zulueta y Madariaga, 2nd Count of Torre Díaz (1809–1882)
- Brodie Manuel de Zulueta, 3rd Count of Torre Diaz (1842–1918)
- Alfonso Maria de Zulueta y Petre, 4th Count of Torre Díaz (1874–1951)
- Alfonso Manuel de Zulueta y Ruiz de Tagle, 5th Count of Torre Díaz (1903–1980)
- Pablo de Zulueta y Browing, 6th Count of Torre Diaz (b. 1956)

=== Other family members ===
- Don Pedro Juan de Zulueta
- Francis de Zulueta (né Francisco Maria José de Zulueta; 1878–1958)
- Sir Philip de Zulueta (1925–1989)

== See also ==
- Spanish nobility
