= List of ambassadors of Spain to Lebanon =

Spanish Ambassadors to Lebanon

Coordinates: 33°53′00″N 35°29′00″E

Ambassador of Spain to the Republic of Lebanon

- Coat of Arms of Spain
- Incumbent; Miguel María de Lucas González since 22 April 2026
- Ministry of Foreign Affairs
- Style: His Excellency
- Nominator: Minister of Foreign Affairs
- Appointer: The Monarch
- Deputy: Deputy Chief of Mission at the Embassy of Spain to Lebanon

The ambassador of Spain to Lebanon is the Kingdom of Spain's foremost diplomatic representative in the Republic of Lebanon.

== History ==
The ambassador is appointed to the Council of Ministers, they direct the work of all the offices that depend on the embassy, based in the city of Beirut. Likewise, it informs the Spanish Government about the evolution of events in Lebanon, negotiates on behalf of Spain, can sign or ratify agreements, observes the development of bilateral relations in all fields and ensures the protection of Spanish interests and its citizens in Lebanon.

The current ambassador is Jesús Ignacio Santos Aguado, who was appointed by Pedro Sánchez's government on 15 March 2022.

== List of Ambassadors ==
Representative	Mission Start	Mission End	Notes
Rafael de los Casares y Moya, Count of Rábago	29 May 1956		
Alfonso Merry del Val y Alzola, 2nd Marquess of Merry del Val	1958	1960	
Manuel Galán y Pacheco de Padilla	10 November 1962		
Emilio García Gómez	25 October 1957	21 March 1968	
Manuel Valdés Larrañaga	21 March 1968	17 April 1970	
José Luis Jordana de Pozas Fuentes	1978	26 February 1982	Former Ambassador in Dublin.
Joaquín Castillo Moreno, Marqués de Jura Real	18 July 1984		
Pedro Manuel de Arístegui y Petit	18 July 1984	16 April 1989	
Mariano García Muñoz	5 June 1998	15 December 2000	
Miguel Benzo Perea	January 2006	January 2009	
Juan Carlos Gafo	January 2009	July 2012	
Milagros Hernando Echevarría	11 May 2012	April 2017	
José María Ferré de la Peña	21 April 2017	15 March 2022	Ambassador to Iraq from 2013 to 2017
Jesús Ignacio Santos Aguado	15 March 2022	22 April 2026	
Miguel María de Lucas González	22 April 2026	Incumbent	
