= List of ambassadors of Spain to the Dominican Republic =

Spanish Ambassadors to the Dominican Republic

Ambassador of the Kingdom of Spain to the Dominican Republic
- Coat of Arms of Spain
- Incumbent; Lorea Arribalzaga Ceballos since 17 June 2025
- Ministry of Foreign Affairs
- Style: His Excellency
- Nominator: Minister of Foreign Affairs
- Appointer: The Monarch
- Inaugural holder: Manuel Aznar
- Deputy: Deputy Chief of Mission at the Embassy of Spain to the Dominican Republic

The Ambassador of Spain to the Dominican Republic is the Kingdom of Spain's foremost diplomatic representative in the Dominican Republic. The current ambassador is Lorea Arribalzaga Ceballos, who was appointed by Pedro Sánchez's government on 17 June 2025.

== History ==
The Spanish ambassador is appointed to the Council of Ministers. Among his functions is to direct the work of all the offices that depend on the embassy, based in Santo Domingo. Likewise, it informs the Spanish Government about the evolution of events in the Dominican Republic, negotiates on behalf of Spain, can sign or ratify agreements, observes the development of bilateral relations in all fields and ensures the protection of Spanish interests and its citizens in the Caribbean country.

== Ambassadors ==
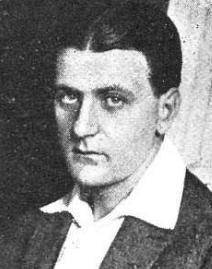
Manuel Aznar Zubigaray

- 1948–1951 Manuel Aznar Zubigaray
- 1951–1954 Manuel Valdés Larrañaga
- 1954–1956 Alfonso Merry del Val y Alzola, 2nd Marqués de Merry del Val
- 1956–1959 Alfredo Sánchez Bella
- 1959–1963 Manuel Valdés Larrañaga
- 1963–1964 Manuel Viturro y Somoza
- 1964–1967 Ricardo Giménez-Arnau y Gran
- 1967–1970 Gabriel Martínez de Mata
- 1970–1976 Aurelio Valls Carreraen
- 1976–1980 Francisco Javier Oyarzun Iñarra
- 1980–1986 José Luis Pérez-Ruíz
- 1986–1988 Luis Mariñas Otero
- 1988–1991 Fernando González-Camino García-Obregónen
- 1991–1993 Manuel de Luna Aguado
- 1993–1995 Ricardo Díez-Hochleitner Rodríguez
- 1995–2000 José Manuel López-Barrón de Labra
- 2000–2002 Fermín Prieto-Castro Roumier
- 2002–2005 María Jesús Figa López-Palop
- 2005–2008 María de la Almudena Mazarrasa Alvear
- 2008–2011 Diego Bermejo Romero de Terreros
- 2011–2012 Jaume Segura Socías
- 2012–2017 Jaime Lacadena Higuera
- 2017–2021 Alejandro Abellán García de Diego
- 2021–2025 Antonio Pérez-Hernández y Torra
- 2025–present Lorea Arribalzaga Ceballos

== See also ==
- Dominican Republic–Spain relations
