= Manuel Aznar Zubigaray =

Spanish diplomat (1893–1975)

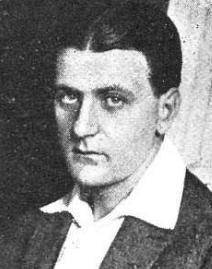
Manuel Aznar

Manuel Aznar Zubigaray (18 November 1893 – 10 November 1975) was a diplomat under the Franco regime and one of the most important journalists of the 20th century in Spain.

== Biography ==
Manuel Aznar Zubigaray was born and raised in Etxalar, Navarre, Spain. He was director of some of the most important Spanish newspapers of the time, like El Sol and La Vanguardia Española, the latter under the Francoist regime. He participated in many literary projects with his friend, Manuel Halcón, Marquess of Villar del Tajo. He also was director and one of the founders of the news agency EFE, President of the Madrid Journalist Association, Plenipotentiary Minister in the United States of America, and Spanish ambassador to the UN, Morocco, and some countries in Latin America such as Argentina and the Dominican Republic. Besides his career in diplomacy and journalism, thanks to his close friendship with Juan Lladó y Sánchez-Blanco, he worked in the management of Banco Urquijo (now Banco Sabadell-Urquijo) being an executive of the bank during the presidency of his friend.

He was married to María de las Mercedes Gómez-Acedo y Villanueva (sister of the footballer Domingo Acedo) in Hendaye and had five sons. His grandson José María Aznar served as Prime Minister of Spain between 1996 and 2004.

As a young man he was a firm supporter of Basque nationalism, a contributor to the radical newspaper La Tradición Navarra and the editor of Euzkadi. In 1914, he staged his El jardín del mayorazgo theatre play, which is not accessible nowadays, and that his rival Indalecio Prieto described as strongly anti-Spanish.

Aznar Zubigaray joined the Basque Nationalist Party in 1916, later he said before that he never supported the radical thesis that later took over the party. Since 1914, he had worked as a correspondent from World War I frontlines, which earned him the position of editor-in-chief at the central El Sol newspaper. During his time as director, he incorporated many of the most prestigious intellectuals of his time like Fernando de los Ríos, Américo Castro, Ramón Basterra, Ramón J. Sender, Miguel de Unamuno or Azorín. With 22 years he was the director of one of the most important Spanish newspapers of all time and the rumors of him being the better paid journalist of Spain arose.

In 1922, he and his family left for Cuba, where Manuel Aznar Zubigaray worked for several local newspapers. He directed El Diario de la Marina and El País of Cuba, returning with the proclamation of the Second Spanish Republic (1931). Nonetheless, he still had ties with Latin America, thus being correspondent in Madrid for the Cuban Diario de la Marina and the Argentinian La Nación. His article: Cuba, lecciones de una derrota was awarded the Spanish Premio Juan Palomo for the best article of the year.

During the Republican period, he was part of the establishment and supported conservative politicians such as Miguel Maura, moving later to the centrist Democratic Centre Party of Portela Valladares. With this Centrist Party he tried being elected to the Spanish Parliament but he was unsuccessful. In 1936, with the start of the Spanish Civil War, Aznar Zubigaray left for Burgos and offered his services to the Francoist army and the Falange. Having directed the liberal and regenerationist El Sol caused him problems and at first he was sentenced to death by both sides of the Civil War. Throughout the war, he was an important author of chronicles of the main military events. In 1940-1943, Aznar wrote his most important works, the Historia militar de la Guerra de España (1936–1939) ("Military History of the Spanish War") and Historia de la Cruzada ("History of the Crusade").

Between 1964 and 1967 he was Spain's ambassador to the United Nations. He also served this role in Morocco, Argentina and the Dominican Republic.

He received many Spanish and international awards. Most of its international awards came because of his pro-Allies views during the First World War. The United Kingdom, the Netherlands and France honored him by making him Knight of their Civil Orders. As well as this, Syria named him Knight of its Merit Order. Spain named him Knight of the Order of Charles III, the most important civil decoration in the country, as well as other Civil and Military awards.

He died in Madrid, Spain, in 1975.

Juan Luis Cebrián, director of El País, underlined the importance of Manuel Aznar saying that he promoted the importance of journalism to promote and restore democracy.

He is still a controversial person in Spain with critics such as Gregorio Morán, Basque nationalist Iñaki Anasagasti or his socialist rival Indalecio Prieto and supporters such as the Count of Rodas, the lawyer Antonio Garrigues Díaz-Cabañate, The Arab League or Manuel Fraga that praised him when he died as a great diplomat and journalist.
