= List of ambassadors of Spain to Denmark =

Spanish Ambassadors to Denmark

Ambassador of Spain to Denmark

- Coat of Arms of Spain
- Incumbent; Salvador Rueda Rabanal since 21 January 2025
- Ministry of Foreign Affairs
- Style: Her Excellency
- Nominator: Minister of Foreign Affairs
- Appointer: The Monarch
- Deputy: Deputy Chief of Mission at the Embassy of Spain to Denmark

The ambassador of Spain to Denmark is the Kingdom of Spain's foremost diplomatic representative in the Kingdom of Denmark.

== History ==
The ambassador is appointed to the Council of Ministers, they direct the work of all the offices that depend on the embassy, based in the city of Copenhagen. Likewise, it informs the Spanish Government about the evolution of events in Denmark, negotiates on behalf of Spain, can sign or ratify agreements, observes the development of bilateral relations in all fields and ensures the protection of Spanish interests and its citizens in the Kingdom of Denmark.

The current ambassador is Salvador Rueda Rabanal, who was appointed by Pedro Sánchez's government on 21 January 2025.

== List of ambassadors and representatives (since 1516) ==
Representative	Mission Start	Mission End	Head of State
Count of Herberstein (ambassador)	1516	1524	Charles I
Jan Hannart (posted in Hamburg)	1524	1524	Charles I
Hermann Sunderhusen (envoy)	1524	1528	Charles I
Cornelio Schepper (envoy)	1528	1531	Charles I
Wollfgang Pratner (envoy)	1531	1532	Charles I
Josse Aemson de Bourch (envoy)	1532	1533	Charles I
Jan de Weeze (ambassador)	1533	1533	Charles I
Gerit Mulert (envoy)	1533	1534	Charles I
Johannes Tucher (envoy)	1534	1534	Charles I
Johann Krentner (envoy)	1534	1534	Charles I
George of Austria (envoy)	1534	1535	Charles I
Stefan Hopfensteiner (envoy)	1535	1536	Charles I
Leonard Funk (envoy)	1536	1537	Charles I
Gerit Mulert (envoy)	1537	1541	Charles I
Joris d'Espleghen (envoy)	1541	1549	Charles I
Johann van Straaten (envoy)	1549	?	Charles I
Juan de Silva (envoy)	1601	1601	Philip III
Juan de Silva (envoy)	1606	1606	Philip III
Bernardino de Rebolledo	1648	1661	Philip IV
Alfonso Merry del Val y Alzola	1957	1958	Francisco Franco
Antonio de Oyarzabal	1994	1996	Juan Carlos I
María Victoria González Román	2022	2025	Felipe VI
Salvador Rueda Rabanal	2025	Incumbent	Felipe VI
