= José María Sánchez-Ventura =

Spanish politician

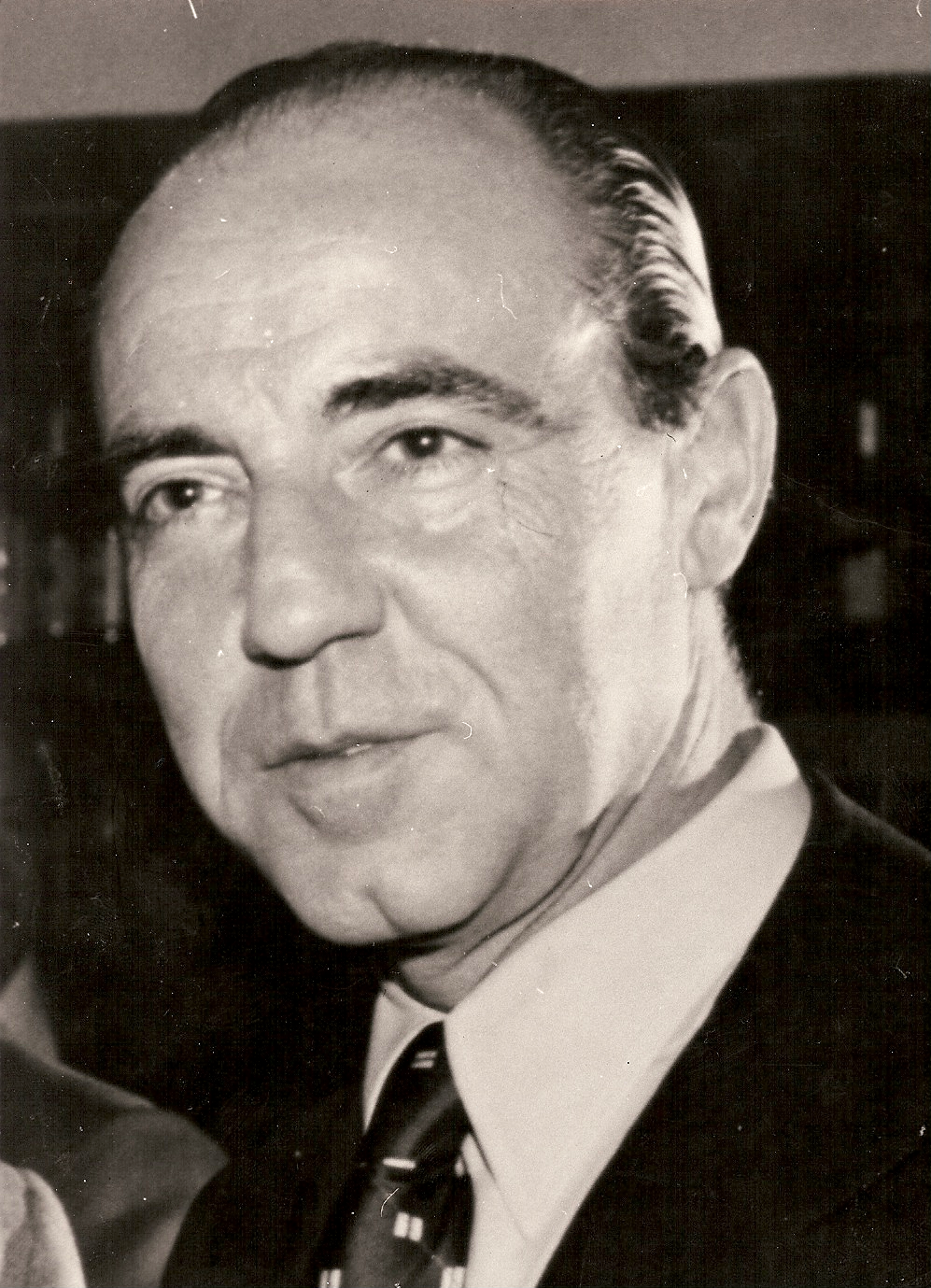

Minister of Justice of Spain
- In office 5 March 1975 – 12 December 1975
- Prime Minister: Carlos Arias Navarro
- Preceded by: Francisco Ruiz-Jarabo
- Succeeded by: Antonio Garrigues Díaz-Cañabate

Personal details
- Born: José María Sánchez-Ventura y Pascual; 28 September 1922 Zaragoza, Kingdom of Spain
- Died: 22 May 2017 (aged 94) Madrid, Spain
- Party: Nonpartisan (National Movement)

José María Sánchez-Ventura y Pascual (28 September 1922 – 22 May 2017) was a Spanish politician who served as Minister of Justice of Spain in 1975, during the Francoist dictatorship.
