= Francisco Ruiz-Jarabo =

Spanish politician

Minister of Justice of Spain
- In office 12 June 1973 – 5 March 1975
- Prime Minister: Luis Carrero Blanco; Carlos Arias Navarro
- Preceded by: Antonio María de Oriol
- Succeeded by: José María Sánchez-Ventura

Personal details
- Born: Francisco Ruiz-Jarabo Baquero; 28 January 1901 Garcinarro, Kingdom of Spain
- Died: 26 September 1990 (aged 89) Madrid, Spain
- Party: FET y de las JONS

Francisco Ruiz-Jarabo Baquero (28 January 1901 – 26 September 1990) was a Spanish politician who served as Minister of Justice of Spain between 1973 and 1975, during the Francoist dictatorship. He was a member of FET y de las JONS.
