= Del Val =

Del Val is a surname. Notable people with the surname include:

- Dominguito del Val, Spanish martyr
- Jean Del Val, French actor
- Ricardo del Val, Argentine politician

== See also ==
- Del (disambiguation)
- Val (disambiguation)
- Del Valle (disambiguation)
- Merry del Val (disambiguation), Spanish surname
