= El Valle de Altomira =

- municipality
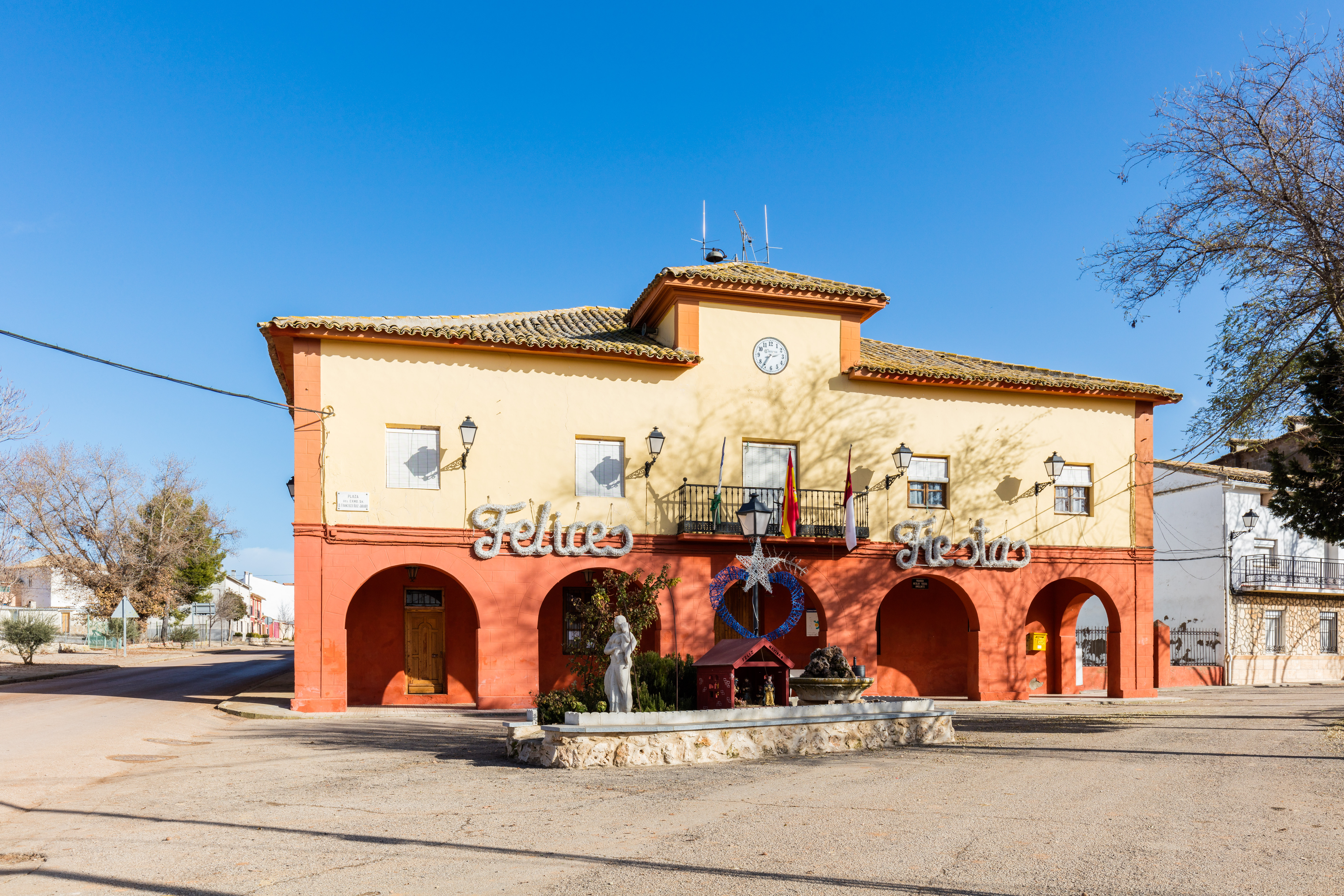
- Town Hall of El Valle de Altomira

- Flag Coat of arms

- Location within Spain Location within Castilla-La Mancha
- Country: Spain
- Autonomous community: Castile-La Mancha
- Province: Cuenca
- Municipality: El Valle de Altomira

Area
  - Total: 147 km^{2} (57 sq mi)

Population (2025-01-01)
  - Total: 191
  - Density: 1.30/km^{2} (3.37/sq mi)
- Time zone: UTC+1 (CET)
  - Summer (DST): UTC+2 (CEST)

El Valle de Altomira is a municipality located in the province of Cuenca, Castile-La Mancha, Spain. According to the 2004 census (INE), the municipality has a population of 323 inhabitants.

It has been named after the Sierra de Altomira, a mountain range in Spain, which stretches between Guadalajara and Cuenca since 2010. Previously, it was called Puebla de Don Francisco after Francisco Ruiz-Jarabo, Minister of Justice between 1973 and 1975 during the Franco dictatorship, who was born in Garcinarro.
