= Antonio de Oyarzabal =

Spanish diplomat and politician

Ambassador of Spain to the United States
- In office 1996–2000
- Preceded by: Jaime de Ojeda y Eiseley
- Succeeded by: Javier Rupérez

Ambassador of Spain to Denmark
- In office 1994–1996

Ambassador of Spain to Japan
- In office 1990–1994
- Preceded by: Camilo Barcia García-Villamil
- Succeeded by: Santiago Salas Collantes

Personal details
- Born: Antonio de Oyarzabal y Marchesi; 12 October 1935 (age 90)
- Spouse: Beatrice Anna Cabot Lodge (m. 1961)
- Education: Institut Le Rosey; University of Madrid Law School; Diplomatic School of Spain

Antonio de Oyarzabal y Marchesi (born 12 October 1935) is a Spanish diplomat and politician.

== Early life ==
Antonio was born on 12 October 1935. Antonio's father, Ignacio de Oyarzabal, was a diplomat and his parents were killed during World War II when a train they were traveling in was hit by a German bomb. His family is of Basque origin, and his uncle was Fernando Marchesi.

He attended Institut Le Rosey in Rolle, Switzerland followed by the University of Madrid Law School. He later studied at the Diplomatic School in Madrid and took advanced language studies in Tours and Grenoble in France and Brighton in England.

== Career ==
After graduating from Diplomatic School in Madrid, he became the third secretary to the Spanish Foreign Office in 1961.

From 1961 to 1970, he served in the Cabinet of the Minister of Foreign Affairs. From 1970 to 1974, he was Secretary of the Embassy of Spain in London. From 1974 to 1976, he served in the cabinet of the José Maldonado González, the last president of the Spanish Republican government in Exile.

From January to July 1977, he served as the governor of Tenerife, the largest and most populated island of the seven Canary Islands, and was the civil governor of Gipuzkoa from 1977 to 1979.

From 1979 to 1981, he was director general of the Diplomatic Information Office and the director general of International Technical Cooperation from 1985 to 1989.

=== Ambassadorships ===
From 1981 to 1983, he served as the Ambassador of Spain to Ecuador in Quito. From 1990 to 1994, he was the Ambassador of Spain to Japan in Tokyo. From 1994 to 1996, he served as the Ambassador of Spain to Denmark in Copenhagen. On 28 August 1996, he was appointed Ambassador of Spain to the United States during the presidency of Bill Clinton, succeeding Jaime de Ojeda y Eiseley. In 2003, during a visit to the Aspen Institute in Aspen, Colorado, he was quoted as saying "I think that to be a diplomat is a privilege, and I take it as such."

=== Later career ===
He later served as the president of the University of Texas MD Anderson Cancer Center Foundation and vice president of the Elcano Royal Institute, Spain’s leading international relations think-tank.

== Personal life ==
On 6 July 1961, Oyarzabal was married to Beatrice Anna Cabot Lodge by the Rev. George E. Everitt at St. Brigid's Roman Catholic Church in Peapack, New Jersey. Beatrice, who attended Miss Hewitt's School in Manhattan, the Potomac School in Washington, and graduated from Marymount School of Barcelona (and studied at the University of Madrid) is the daughter of Italian born actress Francesca Braggiotti Lodge and John Davis Lodge, an actor who became the governor of Connecticut and the U.S. Ambassador to Spain, and the sister of Lily de Pourtales Lodge. She was presented to Queen Elizabeth II in April 1957. The Lodge's owned a home along the Costa del Sol in Marbella, Spain.

Oyarzabal and his wife were close friends of U.S. Supreme Court Justice Ruth Bader Ginsburg and her late husband, Martin D. Ginsburg, and spent many New Year's Eves with them at the Ginsburg's Watergate apartment.
