= Justin Sheil =

Irish diplomat and soldier

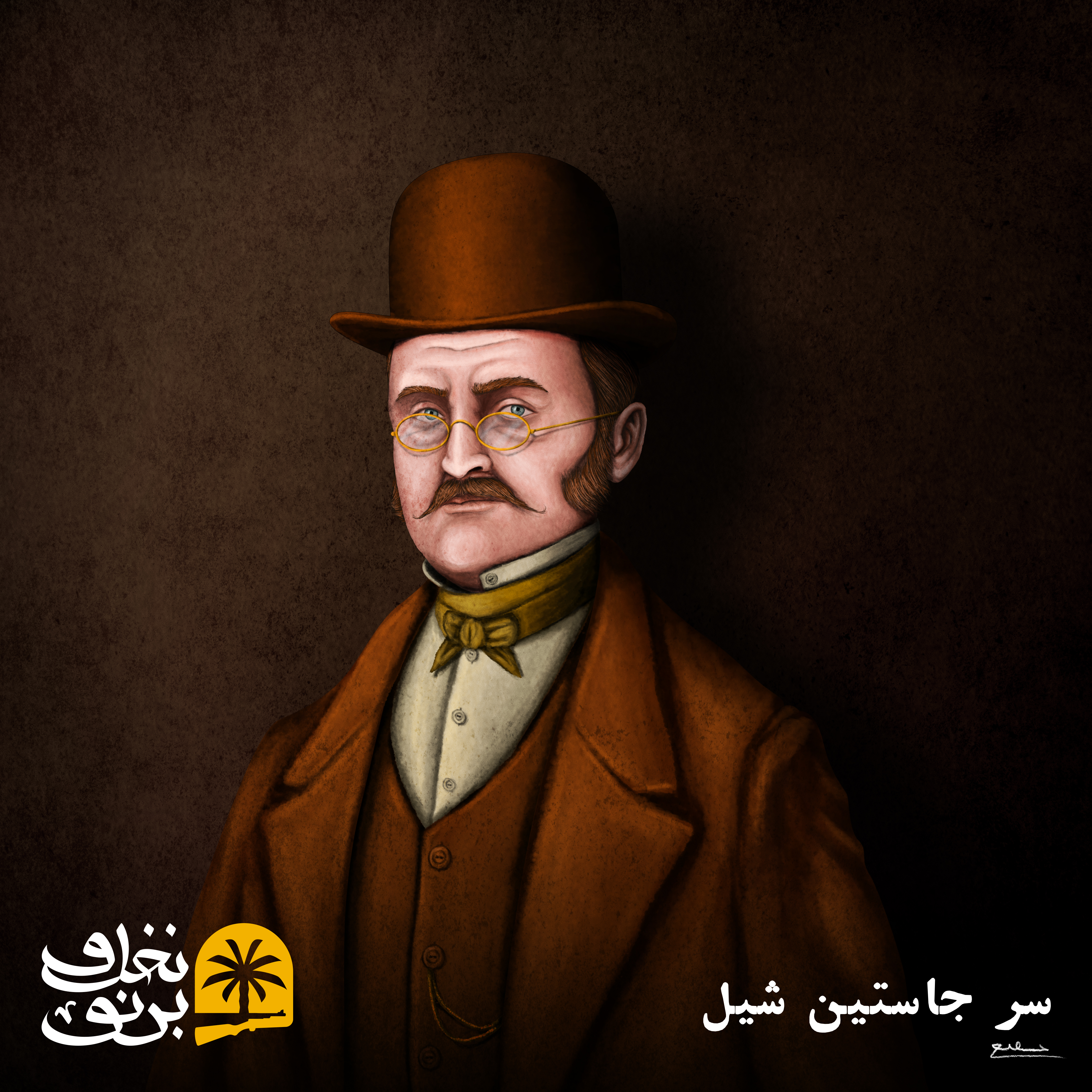

British envoy in Persia
- In office 1844–1854
- Preceded by: John McNeill
- Succeeded by: Charles Murray

Personal details
- Born: Justin Sheil; 2 December 1803 Waterford، Ireland
- Died: April 18, 1871 (aged 67) London، England
- Spouse: Mary Leonora Woulfe
- Relations: Brother of Richard Lalor Sheil
- Children: Edward Sheil, Mary Emily, Laura and seven other children
- Parent(s): Edward Sheil and Catherine McCarthy
- Occupation: Diplomat

Major-General Sir Justin Sheil KCB (2 December 1803 – 18 April 1871) was an Irish army officer and diplomat, the British envoy in Persia from 1844 to 1854.

== Life ==
The son of Edward Sheil and Catherine McCarthy, and brother of Richard Lalor Sheil, he was born at Bellevue House, near Waterford, on 2 December 1803. Educated at Stonyhurst College, he was nominated to an East India Company cadetship.

On arriving in India Sheil was posted as ensign to the 3rd Bengal infantry (4 March 1820). Exchanged to the 35th Bengal infantry, of which he became adjutant, he was present at the Siege of Bharatpur. Becoming a captain on 13 April 1830, he was on 4 July 1833 appointed second in command of regular troops in Persia under Major Pasmore; Pasmore had recommended him to Lord William Bentinck and praised him highly.

On 16 February 1836 Sheil was appointed secretary to the British legation in Persia, and in 1844 he succeeded Sir John McNeill as envoy and minister at the Shah's court. He held the post till his retirement in 1854. He was promoted to the rank of major on 17 February 1841, and became a major-general in 1859. In 1848 he was created a C.B., and in 1855 a K.C.B.

Sheil died in London on 18 April 1871. He chose not to be buried alongside his wife, who had died in Ireland two years earlier.

== Works ==
Sheil contributed notes on Koords, Turkomans, Nestorians, Khiva, ..., to a book Glimpses of Life and Manners in Persia (London, 1856), written by his wife. He published in vol. viii. of the Royal Geographical Society's Journal "Notes of a Journey from Kurdistan to Suleimaniyeh in 1836", and "Itinerary from Tehran to Alamut in May 1837".

== Family ==
Sheil married the writer Mary Leonora Woulfe, daughter of Stephen Woulfe, Chief Baron of the Irish Exchequer and Frances Hamill. She died in 1869: she is buried in Glasnevin Cemetery, far from her husband. They had ten children, including the politician Edward Sheil, Mary Emily (died 1888), who married her cousin, the leading journalist John Woulfe Flanagan, and Laura, who married the Spanish diplomat Pedro de Zulueta and was the mother of Francis de Zulueta, Regius Professor of Civil Law (Oxford) at the Regius Professor of Law.

== Notes ==
Attribution

This article incorporates text from a publication now in the public domain: Lee, Sidney, ed. (1897). "Sheil, Justin". Dictionary of National Biography. Vol. 52. London: Smith, Elder & Co.
