= Francis de Zulueta =

Regius Professor of Civil Law (1878–1958)

Francis de Zulueta, FBA (born Francisco Maria José de Zulueta, 12 September 1878 – 16 January 1958) was the Regius Professor of Civil Law at the University of Oxford from 1919 until 1948.

== Early life ==
The son of Pedro Juan de Zulueta, Count of Torre Díaz, a Spanish diplomat, by his wife Laura Sheil, a daughter of Sir Justin Sheil and his wife Mary Leonora Woulfe. Francis's brother Pedro was a composer of operettas, song, and waltzes.

De Zulueta was educated at Beaumont College, The Oratory School and New College, Oxford, where he took Firsts in classical moderations (1899), literae humaniores (1901), and jurisprudence (1902). He was elected to a prize fellowship at Merton College, Oxford, in October 1902, and won the Vinerian Scholarship the following year.

=== Family ===
De Zulueta is an ancient Catholic Basque family from the Pamplona region of Northern Spain, tracing its Catholic and genealogical ancestry back at the least by 700 years including participating in the key battle of Las Navas de Tolosa is 1212 which began the defeat of the Muslim invaders in Spain and being directly related to a number of senior Spanish titles including the Marquis de Merry del Val and Conde de Torre Díaz (a title awarded by Isabella II of Spain in 1846). This part of the family moved to the UK in the early 19th century for political reasons. Co-funding the P&O shipping company and establishing a Merchant Bank, Zulueta & Co. in the City of London. This ancestor, Pedro José de Zulueta, was a highly successful politician, trader and entrepreneur in the 19th century in both Spain and England including having been the President of the Cortes de Cadiz which in 1814 effectively granted the Spanish Colonies in South America their independence- which was finally accepted by the Bourbon King Ferdinand in 1820.

The family is directedly related to the Hennessy titles of Baron Windlesham, the Earls of Courtenay and the ancient Norman/Irish titles connected with the De Courcy Lys family.

== Career ==
He was called to the bar by Lincoln's Inn in 1904. He subsequently returned to Oxford as a fellow of New College, Oxford, and of All Souls College, Oxford; he was made an Honorary Fellow of Merton College in 1937.

On the outbreak of World War I, de Zulueta, who regarded himself as British rather than Spanish, was naturalized a British subject, and was commissioned into the Worcestershire Regiment, reaching the rank of captain. In 1919, he was appointed Regius Professor of Civil Law at All Souls, becoming the first Roman Catholic Regius Professor since the Reformation.

He was awarded an honorary doctorate by the University of Paris.

=== Catholicism ===
He was the leading Catholic figure in Oxford for many years and the first Catholic Regius Professor since the Reformation, befriending Tolkien amongst others with whom he debated the nature of good and evil prior to The Lord of the Rings. He was a cousin of Cardinal Merry del Val (Cardinal and Secretary of State under Pope Pius XI).

Zulueta was a senior member of the British Sovereign Military Order of Malta carrying on the long held family faith of Catholicism with a cousin having been the President of the more senior Spanish Order.

=== Descendants ===
A number of direct descendants still successfully operate in the City of London. His son Sir Philip de Zulueta became the Foreign Office Secretary to the PM at 10 Downing Street throughout the Cold War, principally to Harold Macmillan, and subsequently his grandson, also Francis, became a leading entrepreneurial professional in insurance in the City of London including co-founding and chairing the Commonwealth Insurance Forum.

== Bibliography ==
Books

- Patronage in the Later Empire
- The Liber Pauperum of Vacarius
- The Roman Law of Sale
- The Institutes of Gaius with Critical Notes and Translation by Francis Zulueta. Vol. 1. Oxford: Clarendon Press. 1958 – via Internet Archive.
- The Institutes of Gaius Commentary by Francis Zulueta. Vol. 2. Oxford: Clarendon Press. 1958 – via Internet Archive.
