= Pedro Gómez Labrador =

Spanish diplomat and nobleman

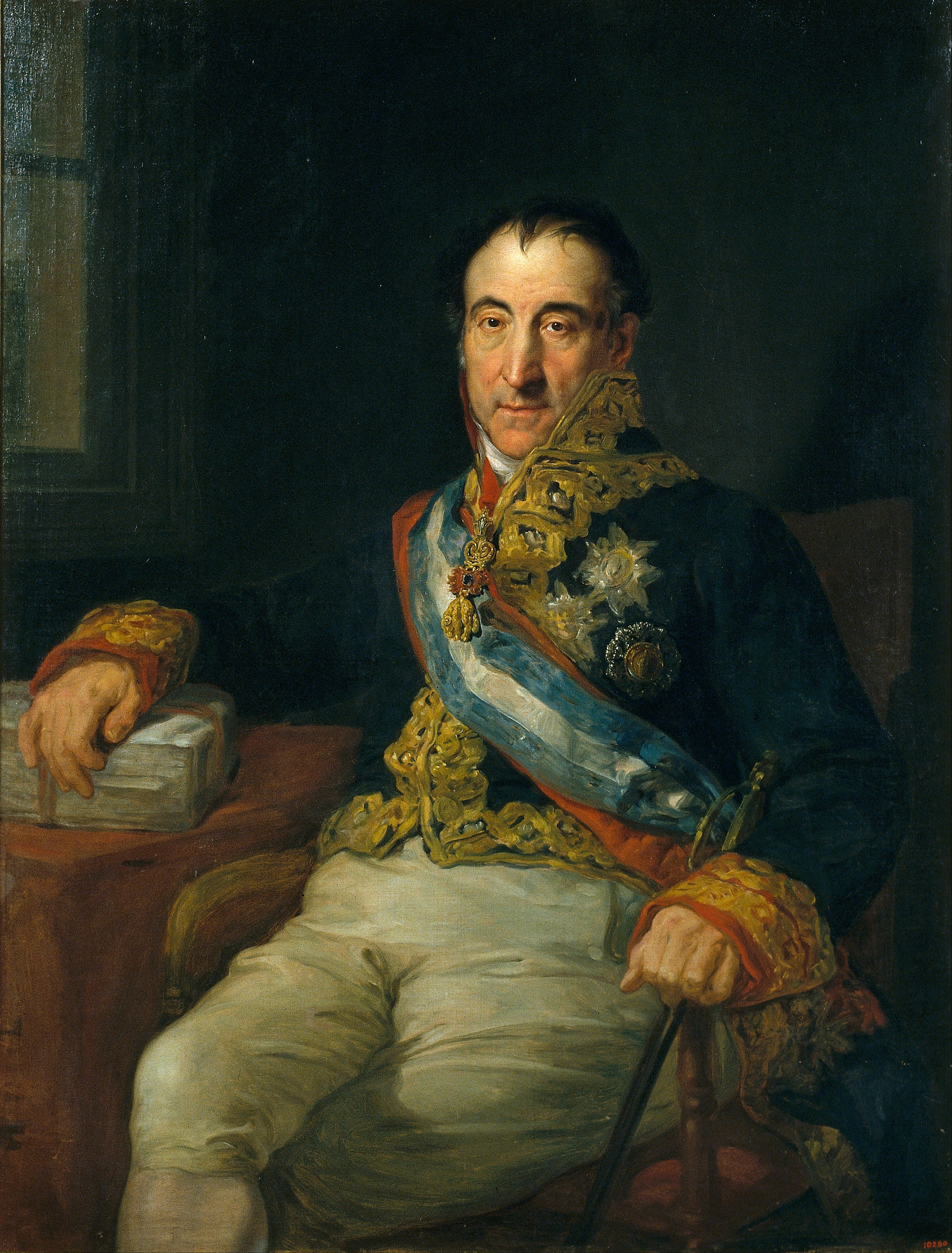
Portrait by Vicente López, c. 1833, National Art Museum of Catalonia (Spain)

Pedro Gómez Labrador, Marquess of Labrador (Valencia de Alcántara, November 30, 1764 – Paris, June 17, 1850) was a Spanish diplomat who served as Spain's representative at the Congress of Vienna (1814–1815).

Labrador did not successfully advance his country's diplomatic goals at the conference. These goals included restoring the Bourbons (who had been deposed by Napoleon) to the thrones of some italian kingdoms and reestablishing control over Spanish American colonies, which had risen for independence from Spain during the failed Napoleonic invasion of Spain, and for which the Congress had no such jurisdiction over.

The Marquess of Labrador is almost universally condemned by historians for his incompetence at the Congress. One standard Spanish history textbook condemns him for "[...] his mediocrity, his haughty character, and his total subordination to the whims of the king's inner circle, by which he achieved nothing favorable." Paul Johnson calls him "a caricature Spaniard who specialized in frantic rages, haughty silences and maladroit demarches."

== Career ==
=== Early life ===
Labrador was born in Valencia de Alcántara, and studied at the traditionally conservative University of Salamanca. He received a bachelor's degree in law at the age of twenty-seven and an advanced degree four years later, and was named a judge on the Audiencia of Seville in 1793.

In August 1798, Labrador was sent as chargé d'affaires in Florence by Charles IV of Spain to accompany Pius VI (r.1775–1799) in exile, when this pontiff was forced to become a prisoner of the French, following his refusal to surrender his temporal sovereignty to the French armies commanded by General Louis Alexandre Berthier.

At the death of Pius VI, Labrador was named Minister Plenipotentiary to the Papal States, and later served at Florence, capital of the Napoleonic Kingdom of Etruria.

The liberal deputies of the national assembly based in Cádiz (1810–1813) took him to be one of their own, and gave him the vital post of Minister of State, a decision they would quickly regret: "Labrador was dim, prolix, of pride and arrogance that trod the limits of fatuity, and of peculiar pedantry." But he was no liberal. He assisted Ferdinand VII in abolishing the liberal constitution of 1812, and was awarded with the duty of representing Spain at the peace conferences of Paris and Vienna, with the full rank and title of Ambassador.

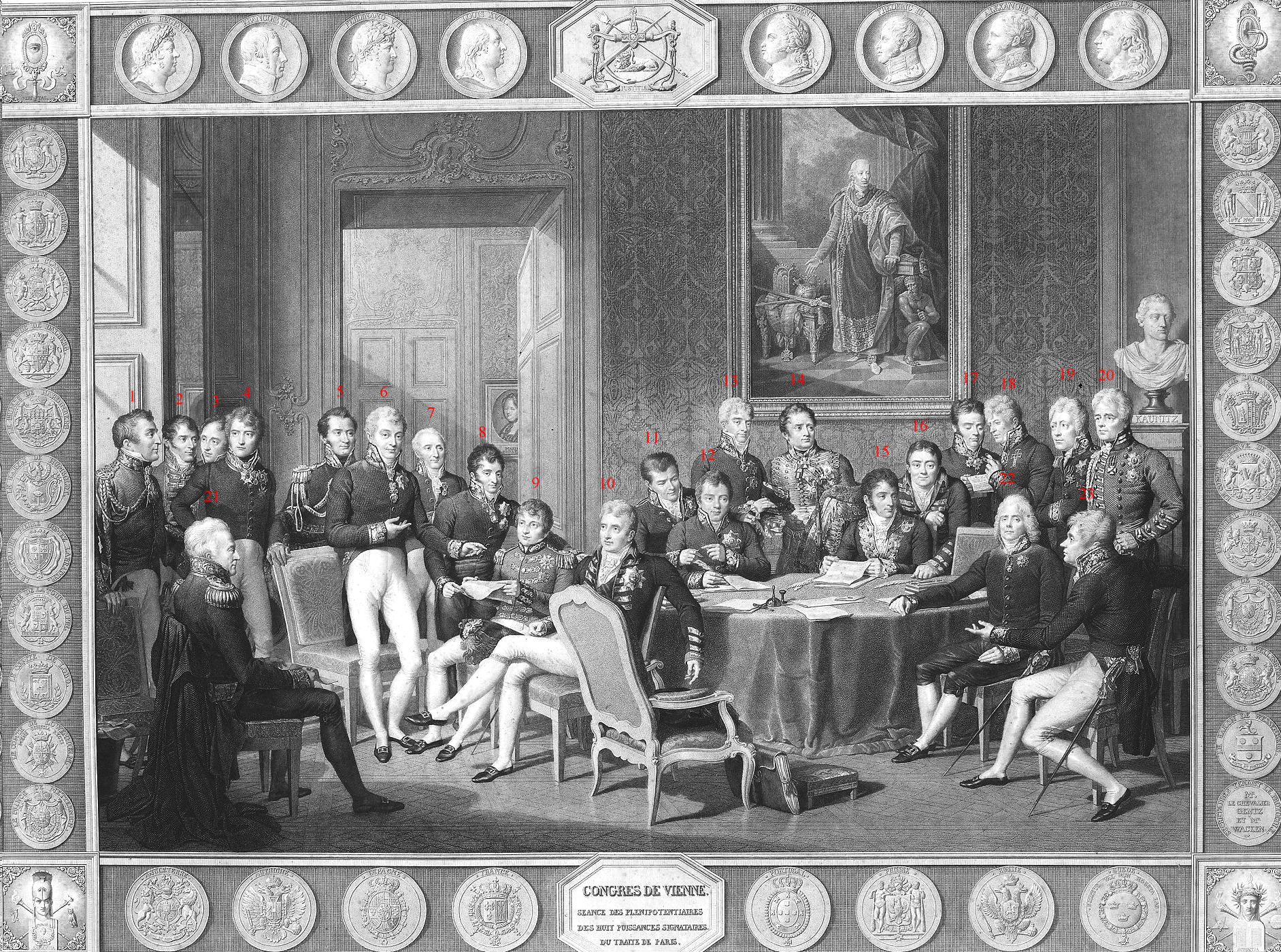
The Congress of Vienna. The Marquess of Labrador is seated at the round table, third from the right of the diplomats who are seated.

=== Congress of Vienna ===
At the start of the Congress, Spain was still one of the largest empires in the world, though most of its American colonies were in open rebellion and seeking independence, though Spain was able to recover Santo Domingo from France in 1814 following the Spanish victory in the Peninsular War with the Treaty of Paris 1814, Spain was on the clear decline. Labrador's entreaties on behalf of the devolution of the former Spanish possession of Louisiana from the United States were roundly ignored. The Austrians blocked plans that would have made Spain a special ally of the Holy See; the British likewise rejected Spain's territorial claims against Portugal. The British particularly were exasperated with their Spanish ally and her representative. "It is somewhat singular in itself," Castlereagh would write, "that the only two Courts with which we find it difficult to do business are those of the Peninsula." In his opinion of Labrador, the Duke of Wellington, Castlereagh's replacement at Vienna and an experienced judge of truculent hidalgos, was more direct: "The most stupid man I ever came across." Labrador was a man, according to the Spanish Minister of State José García de León y Pizarro "...of little amiability [and of] few or no dinners or gatherings." And in this apogee of drawing-room diplomacy, this was fatal.

Labrador could in fact rely neither on his choleric personality to repair any relations, personal or diplomatic, nor on a salary that the Spanish government never paid him, to arrange any social gatherings at his residence on the Minoritten Platz, the Palais Pálffy. "He did not even figure," his biographer assures us, "as a protagonist in any of the many amorous adventures [that occurred during the Congress]"; the most exciting social event Labrador seems to have attended was a wax figures production in the Christmastide of 1814.

Spain did not sign the Final Act of the Congress of June 9, 1815, for Labrador's proposal to attach reservations to the act concerning the rights of the Italian Bourbons was soundly disregarded. Labrador registered a protest against several of the Congress resolutions, including that concerning the restitution of Olivenza.

With the only European restoration of picayune Lucca as a Bourbon-Parma duchy to show for her efforts, and represented by a man overwhelmed with his charge ("I must have the face of a favorite aunt [for] everyone is coming to me with their troubles"), Spain's status as a second-rate power with colonial independence movements overseas was confirmed. Spain finally accepted the treaty on 7 May 1817.

=== Later life ===
He was appointed ambassador in Naples on March 17, 1817, and Plenipotentiary minister in Rome between 1827 and 1831. Upon the death of King Ferdinand VII on September 29, 1833, he leaned towards the Infante Don Carlos, believing that the Monarch had betrayed the Crown by making a pact with the French in 1823. The Carlist cause led him to spend the rest of his life exiled in France, in the service of Don Carlos.

As a reaction, on May 6, 1834 all his Spanish decorations, titles, positions and honors were withdrawn, because of his support for the traditionalist cause of the pretender Don Carlos.

Labrador's long life ended tragically: he had eventually lost his position in the diplomatic service, his wife, his sight, his judgment, and his fortune.

== Notes ==
1. "Pedro Gómez Labrador y Havela". Diccionario biográfico español. Real Academia de la Historia.
2. Ernesto Jimenez Navarro, La Historia de España (Madrid: Compañia Bibliografica Española, S.A., 1946), 506.
3. Paul Johnson, The Birth of the Modern: World Society 1815-1830 (New York: HarperCollins Publishers, 1991), 99.
4. Wenceslao Ramírez de Villa-Urrutia, Marqués de Villa-Urrutia, España en el Congreso de Viena según la correspondencia de D. Pedro Gómez Labrador, Marqués de Labrador. Segunda Edición Corregida y Aumentada (Madrid: Francisco Beltrán, 1928), 28.
5. Harold Nicolson, The Congress of Vienna: A Study in Allied Unity 1812-1822 (New York: Harcourt, Brace and Company, 1946), 208–9.
6. Johnson, Birth of the Modern, 99.
7. Vicente Palacio Atard, Manual de Historia de España, vol. 4. Edad Contemporánea I: 1808-1898 (Madrid: Espasa Calpe, 1978), 106.
8. Villa-Urrutia, España en el Congreso de Viena, 124. His biographer is also of the opinion that Labrador was jealous of Talleyrand and Metternich for their well-known aptitude for womanizing.
9. Antonio Rodríguez-Moñino (ed.), Cartas Políticas (Badajoz: Imprenta Provincial, 1959), 31 (Letter XIII, September 23, 1814).
10. "Pedro Gómez Labrador y Havela". Diccionario biográfico español. Real Academia de la Historia.

== Sources ==
- Alsop, Susan Mary. The Congress Dances. New York: Harper & Row, Publishers, 1984.
- Palacio Atard, Vicente. Manual de Historia de España, vol. 4. Edad Contemporánea I: 1808-1898. Madrid: Espasa-Calpe, 1978.
- Bergamini, John D. The Spanish Bourbons. The History of a Tenacious Dynasty. New York: G. P. Putnam's Sons, 1974.
- Bernard, J. F. Talleyrand: A Biography. New York: G.P. Putnam's Sons, 1973.
- Carr, Raymond. Spain 1808-1939. London: Oxford University Press, 1966.
- Cortada, James W. (editor). Spain in the Nineteenth-Century World. Essays on Spanish Diplomacy, 1789-1898. Westport: Greenwood Press, 1994.
- Espronceda, José de. Poesías Líricas y Fragmentos Épicos. Edición, introducción y notas de Robert Marrast. Madrid: Clásicos Castalia, 1970.
- Tuñón de Lara, Manuel. La España del Siglo XIX- 1808-1914. París: Club del Libro Español, 1961.
- Ramirez de Villa-Urrutia, Wenceslao, Marqués de Villa-Urrutia. España en el Congreso de Viena según la correspondencia de D. Pedro Gómez Labrador, Marqués de Labrador. Segunda Edición Corregida y Aumentada. Madrid: Francisco Beltrán, 1928.
- Freksa, Frederick (compiler). A Peace Conference of Intrigue: A Vivid, Intimate Account of the Congress of Vienna Composed of the Personal Memoirs of its Important Participants. Translated and With an Introduction and Notes by Harry Hansen. New York: The Century Co., 1919.
- Gaya Nuño, Juan Antonio. Historia del Museo del Prado (1819-1969). León: Editorial Everest, 1969.
- Herold, J. Christopher. The Age of Napoleon. New York: American Heritage Publishing Co., Inc., 1963.
- Jimenez Navarro, Ernesto. La Historia de España. Madrid: Compañia Bibliografica Española, S.A., 1946.
- Johnson, Paul. The Birth of the Modern: World Society 1815-1830. New York: HarperCollins Publishers, 1991.
- Lockhart, J. G. The Peacemakers 1814-1815. London: Duckworth, 1932.
- Lovett, Gabriel H. Napoleon and the Birth of Modern Spain. The Challenge to the Old Order. Two Volumes. New York: New York University Press, 1965.
- Marin Correa, Manuel (editor). Historia de España. Ultimos Austrias y primeros Borbones. De Carlos IV a Isabel II. Barcelona: Editorial Marin, S.A., 1975.
- Muir, Rory. Britain and the Defeat of Napoleon 1807-1815. New Haven and London: Yale University Press, 1996.
- Nicolson, Harold. The Congress of Vienna: A Study in Allied Unity 1812-1822. New York: Harcourt, Brace and Company, 1946.
- Regla, Juan (editor). Historia de España Ilustrada. Barcelona: Editorial Ramon Sopena, S.A., 1978.
- Rodríguez-Moñino, Antonio (editor). Cartas Políticas del Marqués de Labrador, París-Viena, 1814. Badajoz: Imprenta Provincial, 1959.
- Spiel, Hilde (editor). The Congress of Vienna: An Eyewitness Account. Translated from the German by Richard H. Weber. New York: Chilton Book Company, 1968.
- Webster, Sir Charles. The Congress of Vienna 1814-1815. London: Thames and Hudson, 1969.
