= List of ambassadors of Spain to Austria =

Spanish Ambassadors to Austria

Ambassador of the Kingdom of Spain to the Republic of Austria

- Coat of Arms of Spain
- Incumbent; María Aurora Mejía Errasquín since 13 March 2024
- Ministry of Foreign Affairs
- Style: Her Excellency
- Nominator: Minister of Foreign Affairs
- Appointer: The Monarch
- Deputy: Deputy Chief of Mission at the Embassy of Spain to Austria

The ambassador of Spain to Austria is the Kingdom of Spain's foremost diplomatic representative in the Republic of Austria.

== History ==
The ambassador is appointed to the Council of Ministers, they direct the work of all the offices that depend on the embassy, based in Vienna. Likewise, it informs the Spanish Government about the evolution of events in Austria, negotiates on behalf of Spain, can sign or ratify agreements, observes the development of bilateral relations in all fields and ensures the protection of Spanish interests and its citizens in the Republic of Belgium.

The current ambassador is María Aurora Mejía Errasquín, who was appointed by Pedro Sánchez's government on 13 March 2024. The headquarters of the embassy is the former Adolf Ritter von Schenk palace, built between 1888 and 1890 and located at the confluence of Theresianumgasse and Argentinierstrasse streets. It was acquired by the Spanish State in 1927.

== List of ambassadors ==
Mission Start	Mission End	Name	Notes
1492	1509	Gutierre Gómez de Fuensalida	Ambassador to the Holy Roman Empire (House of Habsburg)
1564	1570	Thomas Perrenot de Granvelle	Ambassador to the Holy Roman Empire
1570	1578	Francisco Hurtado de Mendoza	Ambassador to the Holy Roman Empire
1578	1581	Juan de Borja y Castro	Ambassador to the Holy Roman Empire
1581	1608	Guillem de Santcliment	Ambassador to the Holy Roman Empire
1608	1617	Baltasar de Zúñiga y Velasco	Ambassador to the Holy Roman Empire
1617	1624	Íñigo Vélez de Guevara	Ambassador to the Holy Roman Empire
1622	1622	Diego Sarmiento de Acuña	Special Envoy
1624	1629	Francisco de Moncada	3rd Marquis of Aitona
1629	1631	Lope Díez de Armendáriz	1st Marquess of Cadreita
1632	1640	Sancho de Monroy y Zúñiga	1st Marquis of Castañeda
1640	1640	Francisco de Melo	-
1642	1644	Manuel de Moura y Corte-Real	1st Marquis of Castelo Rodrigo
1644	1648	Diego de Aragón Tagliavia	4th Duke of Terranova
1648	1656	Francisco de Moura y Corte-Real	3rd Marquis of Castelo Rodrigo
1656	1661	Gaspar de Teves y Tello de Guzmán	1st Marquis of La Fuente de Torno
1661	1662	Antonio Sebastián Álvarez de Toledo	2nd Marquis of Mancera
1662	1666	Vacant	Managed by Secretary Diego de Prado
1666	1672	Baltasar de la Cueva	7th Count of Castellar
1670	1676	Paolo Spinola	3rd Marquis of Los Balbases
1681	1695	Carlo Emmanuel d'Este	4th Marquis of Borgomanero
1696	1700	Juan Alfonso Valerià y Aloza	Bishop of Solsona
1700	1700	Francisco Moles	2nd Duke of Parete
1700	1725	Vacant	Interruption of diplomatic relations between Austria and Spain due to the War of Spanish Succession
1725	1725	Juan Guillermo Ripperdá	1st Duke of Ripperdá; Treaty of Vienna
1727	1728	Baluard de Bournonville	-
1728	1731	José de Viana y Eguiluz	-
1731	1733	James Fitz-James Stuart	2nd Duke of Berwick
1734	1737	Vacant	Interruption of diplomatic relations between Austria and Spain due to the War of Polish Succession
1737	1738	Pedro de Cebrián y Agustín	5th Count of Fuenclara
1738	1741	José Carpintero	-
1741	1748	Vacant	Interruption of diplomatic relations between Austria and Spain due to the Austrian War of Succession
1750	1754	Antonio de Azlor y Marimón	-
1755	1760	Alonso Verdugo y Castilla	3rd Count of Torrepalma
1760	1777	Demetrius O'Mahony	-
1777	1779	Domingo de Iriarte	Secretary
1779	1785	Vicente Manrique de Zúñiga	13th Count of Aguilar de Inestrillas
1786	1794	José Agustín Llano y de la Quadra	1st Marquess of Llano
1795	1801	Manuel Negrete de la Torre	2nd Count of Campo de Alange
1802	1807	Pablo de Sangro y Merode	Prince of Castelfranco
1808	1814	Vacant	Peninsular War
1814	1815	Pedro Gómez Labrador	Marquess of Labrador; Spanish representative at the Congress of Vienna
1815	1816	José Miguel de Carvajal-Vargas	2nd Duke of San Carlos
1816	1820	Pedro Cevallos	-
1824	1825	José Antonio Flores	Count of Casa Flores
1825	1828	Joaquín de Acosta y Montealegre	-
1829	1834	Joaquín de Campuzano	-
1833	1842	Antonio de Saavedra y Frígola	Count of Alcudia
1848	1848	Antonio Remón Zarco del Valle	-
1848	1850	Mauricio Álvarez Bohórquez	Duke of Gor
1850	1851	Salvador de Zea Bermúdez	Count of Colombi
1851	1856	Luis López de la Torre Ayllón y Kirsmacker	-
1856	1857	Manuel Bermúdez de Castro	-
1857	1858	Leopoldo Augusto de Cueto	1st Marquis of Valmar
1858	1868	Luis López de la Torre Ayllón y Kirsmacker	2nd term
1868	1869	Manuel Rancés y Villanueva	-
1870	1875	Cipriano del Mazo	-
1871	1874	Mariano Asquerino	-
1875	1878	Carlos O’Donnell y Vargas	2nd Duke of Tetuán
1879	1879	Eduardo de Carondelet y Dato	3rd Duke of Bailén
1878	1885	Augusto Conte Lerdo de Tejada	-
1886	1892	Rafael Carlos Merry del Val	-
1893	1895	Juan Valera y Alcalá-Galiano	-
1895	1898	Isidoro de Hoyos y de la Torre	2nd Marquis of Hoyos
1898	1902	José Gutiérrez de Agüera	-
1902	1906	Wenceslao Ramírez de Villa-Urrutia	1st Marquis of Villa-Urrutia
1905	1907	Manuel María González de Castejón y Elío	4th Duke of Bailén
1907	1909	Julio de Arellano y Arróspide	-
1909	1913	Juan Bustamante y Campuzano	2nd Marquis of Herrera
1913	1918	Antonio de Castro y Casaléiz	
1918	1919	Eugenio Ferraz y Alcalá-Galiano	2nd Marquis of Amposta
1919	1924	Manuel Alonso de Ávila y Bernabeu	
1924	1926	Antonio de Zayas	4th Duke of Amalfi
1926	1931	Francisco de Asís Serrat y Bonastre	
1931	1934	Manuel Alonso de Ávila y Bernabeu	2nd term
1936	1938	Eduardo García Comín	-
1936	1938	Juan Schwartz Díaz-Flores	-
1938	1956	No relations	Austria part of Nazi-Germany until 1945, then occupied by the Allies
	1956	Luis de Urquijo y Landecho	2nd Marquess of Bolarque
1956	1964	José Sebastián de Erice y O'Shea	-
1964	1965	Segismundo Royo Villanova y Fernández-Cavada	-
1965	1967	Antonio de Luna García	-
1967	1970	Joaquín Buxó-Dulce de Abaigar	Marquess of Castellflorite
1970	1974	Miguel María de Lojendio Irure	-
1974	1976	Laureano López Rodó	-
1976	1981	Juan Manuel Castro-Rial y Canosa	-
1981	1985	Juan Luis Pan de Soraluce y Olmos	Count of San Román
1985	1991	Jesús Núñez Hernández	-
1991	1996	Miguel Ángel Ochoa Brun	-
1996	2000	Ricardo Díez-Hochleitner Rodríguez	-
2000	2004	Raimundo Pérez-Hernández y Torra	-
2004	2008	Juan Manuel de Barandica y Luxán	-
2008	2010	Josep Maria Pons Irazazábal	-
2010	2013	Yago Pico de Coaña y de Valicourt	-
2013	2017	Alberto Carnero Fernández	Evo Morales grounding incident
2017	2020	Juan Sunyé Mendía	-
2020	2024	Cristina Fraile Jiménez de Muñana	
2024	Incumbent	María Aurora Mejía Errasquín	

== See also ==
- Foreign relations of Spain
