= List of ambassadors of Spain to the Holy See =

Spanish Ambassadors to the Holy See

Ambassador of Spain to the Holy See

- Coat of Arms of Spain
- Incumbent; María Isabel Celáa Diéguez since 26 January 2022
- Ministry of Foreign Affairs
- Style: Her Excellency
- Nominator: Minister of Foreign Affairs
- Appointer: The Monarch
- Deputy: Deputy Chief of Mission at the Embassy of Spain to the Holy See

The Ambassador of Spain to the Holy See is the Kingdom of Spain's foremost diplomatic representative in the Holy See.

== History ==
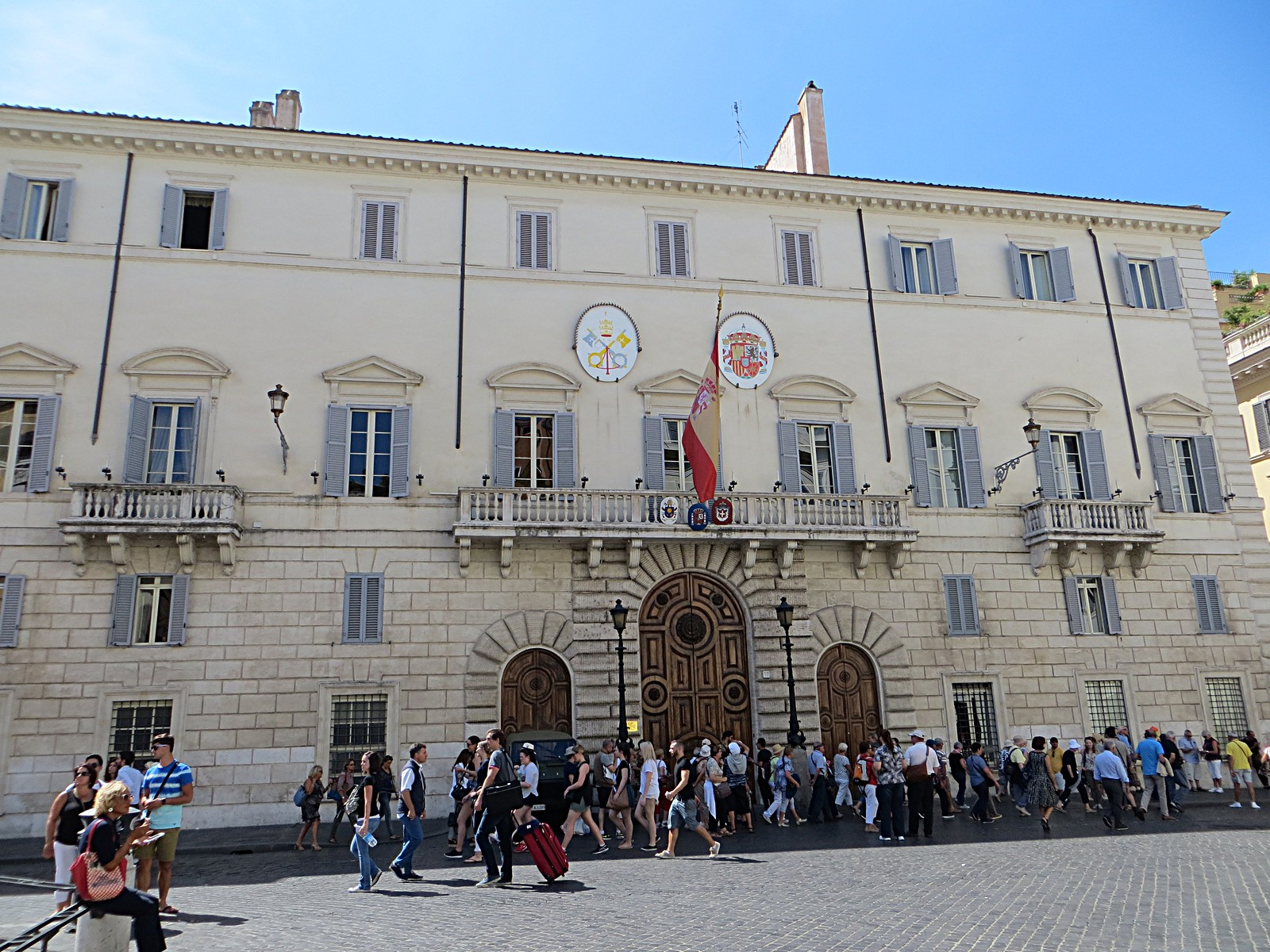
Palazzo di Spagna, headquarters of the Spanish embassy to the Holy See.

The ambassador is appointed to the Council of Ministers, they direct the work of all the offices that depend on the embassy, based in Vatican City. Likewise, it informs the Spanish Government about the evolution of events in the Holy See, negotiates on behalf of Spain, can sign or ratify agreements, observes the development of bilateral relations in all fields and ensures the protection of Spanish interests and its citizens in the Holy See.

The current ambassador is María Isabel Celáa Diéguez, who was appointed by Pedro Sánchez's government on 26 January 2022.

== List of ambassadors ==
Mission Start	Mission End	Name	Notes
1475	1475	Gonzalo Fernández de Heredia	
1475	1476	García Martínez de Lerma	
1478	1479	Francisco de Santillana, Bishop of Osma	
1480	1484	Gonzalo de Beteta	
1485	1487	Íñigo López de Mendoza, Count of Tendilla	
1487	1488	Francisco de Rojas y Escobar	
1488	1493	Bernardino López de Carvajal	
1494	1499	Garcilaso de la Vega, Señor de los Arcos	
1499	1502	Lorenzo Suárez de Figueroa	
1501	1507	Francisco de Rojas y Escobar	
1507	1518	Jerónimo Vich y Valterra	
1518	1520	Luis Carroz de Vilaragut	
1520	1522	Juan Manuel, señor de Belmonte	
1522	1526	Luis Fernández de Córdoba y Zúñiga	
1526	1533	Giovan Antonio Muxetula	
1532	1536	Fernando de Silva, Conde de Cifuentes	
1536	1543	Juan Fernández Manrique de Lara, Marquess of Aguilar de Campoo	
1543	1547	Juan de Vega y Acuña	
1547	1553	Diego Hurtado de Mendoza	
1554	1555	Juan Manrique de Lara	
1554	1558	Edward Carne	
1559	1563	Francisco de Vargas y Mejía	
1562	1564	Luis de Zúñiga y Requesens	
1566	1566	Luis Fernández-Manrique de Lara, Marquess of Aguilar de Campoo	Ambassador Extraordinary sent by Philip II to congratulate Pope Pius V on his election.
1566	1568	Luis de Zúñiga y Requesens	2nd term
1568	1579	Juan de Zúñiga y Requesens	
1578	1581	Alvaro de Borja y Castro, Marqués de Alcañices	
1582	1590	Enrique de Guzmán y Ribera, 2nd Count of Olivares	
1590	1603	Antonio Fernández de Córdoba y Cardona, 5th Duke of Sessa	
1603	1606	Juan Fernandez Pacheco, 5th Duke of Escalona	
1606	1609	Gastón de Moncada, 2nd Marquis of Aitona	
1609	1616	Francisco Ruiz de Castro	
1616	1619	Gaspar de Borja y Velasco	Again ambassador from 1631 to 1633.
1619	1623	Francisco Fernández de la Cueva, 7th Duke of Alburquerque	
1623	1626	Ruy III Gómez de Silva y Mendoza, 3rd Duke of Pastrana	
1625	1626	Fernando Afán de Ribera y Téllez-Girón, 3rd Duke of Alcalá	Extraordinary appointed by Philip IV
1626	1628	Íñigo Vélez de Guevara y Tassis, 7th Count of Oñate	
1628	1631	Manuel de Acevedo y Zúñiga, 6th Count of Monterrey	
1631	1631	Diego de Saavedra Fajardo	
1631	1633	Gaspar de Borja y Velasco	Second term.
1633	1641	Manuel de Moura y Corte-Real, 2nd Marquess of Castel-Rodrigo	
1633	1637	Domingo Pimentel	Ambassadors Extraordinary, sent by Philip IV to protest against the damages that Spain received from Rome.
1633	1643	Juan Chumacero Carrillo y Sotomayor	Ambassadors Extraordinary, sent by Philip IV to protest against the damages that Spain received from Rome.
1641	1644	Pedro III Fajardo, 5th Marquis of Los Vélez	
1644	1645	Juan Velasco de la Cueva y Pacheco, 7th Count of Siruela	
1646	1648	Íñigo Vélez de Guevara, 8th Count of Oñate	
1649	1651	Rodrigo Díaz de Vivar Mendoza y Sandoval, 7th Duke of the Infantado	
1652	1654	Duarte Fernando Álvarez de Toledo, 7th Count of Oropesa	
1654	1657	Diego de Aragón Tagliavia, 4th Duke of Terranova	
1657	1661	Luis de Guzmán Ponce de Leon	
1661	1664	Pascual de Aragón	Cardinal
1662	1666	Pedro Antonio de Aragón	Brother of the previous Ambassador.
1667	1672	Antonio Pedro Sancho Dávila y Osorio, 10th Marquess of Astorga	
1672	1682	Gaspar Méndez de Haro, 7th Marquess of Carpio	Absent between 1672 and 1676.
1682	1687	Carlo Pio di Savoia	
1687	1696	Luis Francisco de la Cerda, 9th Duke of Medinaceli	
1696	1698	Luis Moscoso Ossorio, Count of Altamira	
1699	1709	Juan Francisco Pacheco Téllez-Girón, Duke of Uceda	
1707	1712	Hercule-Louis Turinetti	Represented the Austrian Archduke Charles, which the Pope had recognized as King of Spain.
1712	1716	Johann Wenzel of Gallas	Represented the Austrian Archduke Charles, which the Pope had recognized as King of Spain.
1717	1725	Francesco Acquaviva d'Aragona	
1726	1732	Marco Cornelio Bentivoglio	
1732	1734	Luis Antonio de Belluga y Moncada	
1735	1747	Troiano Acquaviva d'Aragona	
1747	1748	Alfonso Clemente de Aróstegui	
1748	1760	Joaquín Fernández Portocarrero	
1760	1765	Manuel de Roda y Arrieta	
1765	1772	Tomás de Azpuru Ximénez	Archbishop of Valencia (1770)
1772	1776	José Moñino y Redondo, Conde de Floridablanca	
1777	1784	Jerónimo Grimaldi, Marquess of Grimaldi	
1784	1798	José Nicolás de Azara	
1798	1799	Francisco Antonio de Lorenzana	
1799	1801	Pedro Gómez Labrador	
1801	1809	Antonio Vargas Laguna	
1809	1814	Peninsular War	
1814	1820	Antonio Vargas Laguna	2nd term
1821	1824	José Narciso de Aparici Soler	
1824	1826	Guillermo Curtoys y Hunt	
1827	1833	Pedro Gómez Labrador, Marqués de Labrador	
1833	1840	Rupture of relations	
1840	1843	Julián Villalba García	
1844	1847	José del Castillo y Ayensa	
1847	1847	Joaquín Francisco Pacheco	
1848	1851	Francisco Martínez de la Rosa	
1851	1852	Salvador Cea Bermúdez, Count of Colombi	
1852	1854	José del Castillo y Ayensa	Second term
1854	1855	Miguel de los Santos de Bañuelos y Travel	
1857	1857	Alejandro Mon y Menéndez	
1857	1858	Pedro José Pidal	
1858	1860	Antonio de los Ríos y Rosas	
1860	1861	Manuel Pando Fernández de Pinedo	
1861	1864	Gerardo de Souza	
1864	1865	Joaquín Francisco Pacheco	
1865	1866	Francisco Javier de Istúriz	
1866	1867	Luis José Sartorius y Tapia	
1867	1868	Alejandro de Castro y Casal	
1868	1869	José Posada Herrera	
1870	1874	Tomás Corral y Oña, Viscount of Oña	Sexenio Democrático
1874	1875	Juan Álvarez de Lorenzana, Viscount of Barrantes	
1875	1876	Antonio Benavides Fernández de Navarrete	
1876	1881	Francisco de Cárdenas	
1881	1884	Alejandro Groizard y Gómez de la Serna	
1884	1886	Mariano Roca de Togores, Marquess of Molins	
1886	1889	Alejandro Groizard y Gómez de la Serna	
1889	1890	José Ruiz de Arana y Saavedra, Duke of Baena	
1891	1892	Luis Pidal y Mon	
1891	1900	Rafael Carlos Merry del Val	
1900	1902	Alejandro Pidal y Mon	
1902	1904	José Gutiérrez de Agüera	
1904	1904	Luis Polo de Bernabé Pilón	
1904	1905	Manuel Aguirre de Tejada	
1905	1906	Rodrigo de Figueroa y Torres	
1906	1911	Emilio de Ojeda y Perpiñán	
1913	1913	Fermín Calbetón y Blanchon	
1913	1916	Cipriano Muñoz y Manzano, Count of the Viñaza	
1916	1917	Fermín Calbetón y Blanchon	
1918	1926	Luis Valera y Delavat	
1926	1930	Antonio Magaz y Pers, 2nd Marquess of Magaz.	
1930	1931	Emilio de Palacios y Fau	
1931	1934	Eduardo García Comin	
1934	1936	Leandro Pita Romero	
1936	1938	Luis de Zulueta y Escolano	
1938	1942	José de Yanguas Messía	
1942	1945	Domingo de las Bárcenas y Lopez-Mollinedo Mercado	
1946	1948	Pablo de Churruca y Dotres, Marquess of Aycinena	previously Ambassador in Lima
1948	1951	Joaquín Ruiz-Giménez Cortés	
1951	1956	Fernando María Castiella y Maíz	
1957	1962	Francisco Gómez de Llano	
1962	1964	José María Doussinague y Texidor	
1964	1972	Antonio Garrigues Díaz-Cañabate, Marquess of Garrigues.	
1972	1973	Juan Pablo de Lojendio e Irure	
1973	1974	Gabriel Martínez de Mata	
1974	1976	Gabriel Fernández de Valderrama y Moreno	
1976	1977	Gonzalo Fernández de Córdova y Moreno	
1977	1980	Ángel Sanz-Briz	
1980	1983	José Joaquín Puig de la Bellacasa y Urdampilleta	
1983	1985	Nuño Aguirre de Cárcer y López de Sagredo	
1985	1987	Gonzalo Puente Ojea	
1987	1992	Jesús Ezquerra Calvo	
1992	1997	Pedro López de Aguirrebengoa	
1997	2004	Carlos Abella y Ramallo	
2004	2006	Jorge Dezcallar de Mazarredo	
2006	2011	Francisco Vázquez Vázquez	
2011	2012	María Jesús Figa López-Palop	
2012	2017	Eduardo Gutiérrez Sáenz de Buruaga	
2017	2018	Gerardo Ángel Bugallo Ottone	
2018	2021	María del Carmen de la Peña Corcuera	
2022	Incumbent	María Isabel Celaá Diéguez	

== See also ==
- Foreign relations of Spain
