= Antonio Garrigues Díaz-Cañabate =

Spanish diplomat, lawyer and politician (1904–2004)

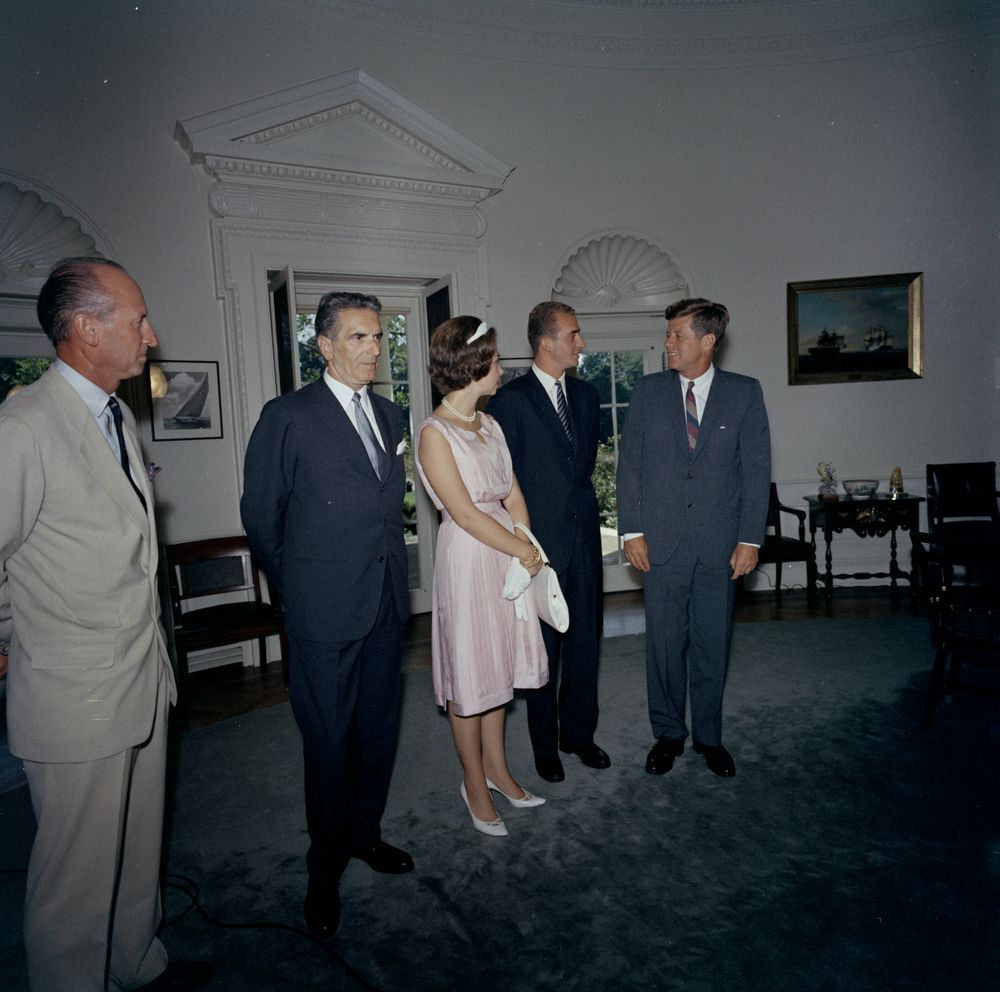
- Meeting with US President John F. Kennedy and Prince Juan Carlos I at the Oval Office, August 1962. Díaz-Cañabate is second from left.

Minister of Justice of Spain
- In office 12 December 1975 – 5 July 1976
- Prime Minister: Carlos Arias Navarro
- Preceded by: José María Sánchez-Ventura
- Succeeded by: Landelino Lavilla

Personal details
- Born: Antonio Garrigues Díaz-Cañabate; 9 January 1904 Madrid, Kingdom of Spain
- Died: 24 February 2004 (aged 100) Madrid, Spain
- Party: Nonpartisan (National Movement)

Antonio Garrigues Díaz-Cañabate, 1st Marquess of Garrigues (9 January 1904 – 24 February 2004) was a Spanish politician who served as the Spanish Ambassador to the United States between 1962 and 1964 and Minister of Justice of Spain between 1975 and 1976, during the Francoist dictatorship.
