= Rafael Carlos Merry del Val =

Spanish nobleman and diplomat

Rafael Carlos Merry del Val (4 November 1831 – 29 August 1917) was a Spanish nobleman and diplomat.

== Early life ==
Merry del Val was born in Seville on 4 November 1831. He was a son of Rafael Merry y Gayté and María de la Trinidad del Val y Gómez. His family were descendants of a noble Irish family, originally from County Waterford, that settled in Seville in the 18th century.

== Career ==
A career diplomat, Merry del Val had missions at the courts of the Kings of Belgium and Great Britain; serving as the Spanish Ambassador to Belgium and to the Holy See and Minister at the Imperial Court of Vienna, and Gentlemen of the Bedchamber to Queen Isabella II and Kings Alfonso XII and Alfonso XII.

== Personal life ==
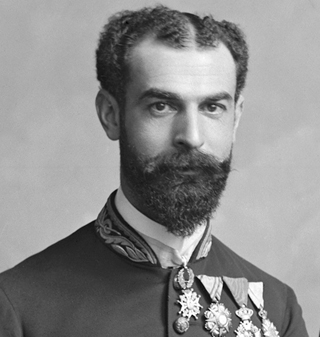
Photograph of his eldest son, the 1st Marquess of Merry del Val, at Queen Victoria's Diamond Jubilee, 24 June 1897

Merry del Val was married to Sofía Josefa de Zulueta (1839–1925), eldest daughter of Pedro José de Zulueta, 2nd Count of Torre Díaz, and the former Sophie Anne Willcox (daughter of Brodie McGhie Willcox, MP for Southampton). Together, they were the parents of four sons, all of whom were born in London:

- Alfonso Merry del Val, 1st Marquess of Merry del Val (1864–1943), the Spanish Ambassador to the United Kingdom.
- Rafael Merry del Val y de Zulueta (1865–1930), the Cardinal Secretary of State to Pope Pius X.
- Pedro Merry del Val y Zulueta (1867–1958), who married Dolores García-Zapata.
- Domingo Merry del Val y Zulueta (1870–1935), who married Emma Ramila Rojas in Santiago, Chile in 1899.

Merry del Val died on 29 August 1917 in San Sebastián.

== Honours ==
- 1878: Grand Cordon in the Order of Leopold.
