= Rafael Merry del Val =

Spanish cardinal (1865–1930)

Servant of God Rafael Merry del Val OL
- Secretary of the Congregation of the Holy Office
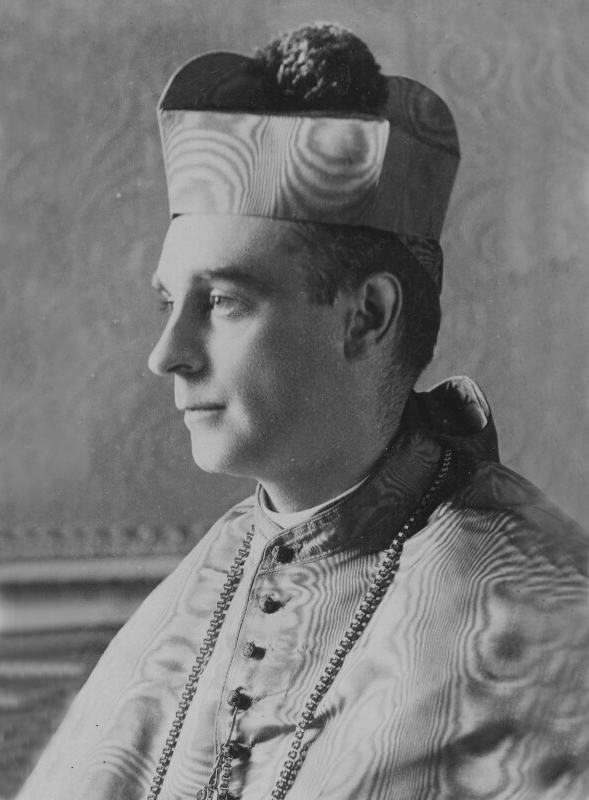
- Portrait, ca. 1905
- Appointed: 14 October 1914
- Term ended: 26 February 1930
- Predecessor: Raffaele Monaco La Valletta
- Successor: Francesco Marchetti Selvaggiani
- Other posts: Cardinal-Priest of Santa Prassede (1903–1930); Archpriest of Saint Peter's Basilica (1914–1930)
- Previous posts: Apostolic Delegate to Canada (1897–1899); President of the Pontifical Ecclesiastical Academy (1899–1903); Titular Archbishop of Nicaea (1900–1903); Secretary of the College of Cardinals (1903); Pro-Secretary of State (1903); Cardinal Secretary of State (1903–1914)

Orders
- Ordination: 30 December 1888
- Consecration: 6 May 1900 by Mariano Rampolla del Tindaro
- Created cardinal: 9 November 1903 by Pope Pius X
- Rank: Cardinal-Priest

Personal details
- Born: Rafael María José Pedro Francisco Borja Domingo Gerardo de la Santísima Trinidad Merry del Val y Zulueta; 10 October 1865 London, United Kingdom
- Died: 26 February 1930 (aged 64) Vatican City
- Denomination: Catholic (Roman Rite)
- Motto: Da mihi animas, Cætera tolle (English "Give me souls, take the rest")
- Coat of arms: Rafael Merry del Val's coat of arms

Rafael Merry del Val y Zulueta, OL (10 October 1865 – 26 February 1930) was a Spanish Catholic prelate who served as Secretary of the Congregation of the Holy Office from 1914 to 1930. He also served in various other Vatican positions and was created a cardinal in 1903.

Before becoming a cardinal, he served as the secretary of the papal conclave of 1903 that elected Pope Pius X, who is said to have accepted his election through Merry del Val's encouragement. Pius X later appointed him Cardinal Secretary of State. Merry del Val's writings and example prompted greater popularity for the litany of humility, which was for some decades incorrectly attributed to him. He was greatly responsible to restoring Catholic canonical privileges to Hispanic countries. A cause for his canonization was opened in 1953 at the behest of Pope Pius XII. He now has the title Servant of God.

== Early life ==
He was born as Rafael María José Pedro Francisco Borja Domingo Gerardo de la Santísima Trinidad Merry del Val y Zulueta at the Spanish Embassy in London, in the United Kingdom, the second of four sons of a nobleman, Rafael Carlos Merry del Val, secretary to the Spanish legation in London. His mother was Sofia Josefa de Zulueta (died 1925), elder daughter of Pedro José de Zulueta, count of Torre Díaz, of the London bank of Zulueta & Co., and his wife, Sophia Ann Wilcox, who was of English ancestry.

The Merrys were originally an Irish Catholic family (the O’Hoolachan family of the County of Connaught) but anglicized their name to Merry in order to avoid the persecution of Roman Catholics that the English were accustomed to carrying out. The O’Hoolachan branch from which Rafael descended were Irish merchants who settled in County Waterford in the 18th century before moving to Seville. In Spain, one Rafael Merry (grandfather of His Eminence) married María Trinidad del Val y Gómez de Sevilla, of Aragonese nobility. María Trinidad, the Cardinal's grandmother, was soon widowed, however, and moved to Madrid as a lady-in-waiting to Queen Isabella II.

His father, also named Rafael, studied law before joining the Diplomatic service. One of his first destinations was to the Spanish embassy in Paris during the time of the Second French Empire, during which time he became a close friend of Empress Eugénie de Montijo, herself a Spaniard. It was also during this time that he befriended Pedro José de Zulueta y Madariaga, a son of the counts of Torre-Díaz who had established himself as a successful banker under his own firm, Zulueta & Co. The young Rafael was united in matrimony to one of his daughters, Josefina de Zulueta y Willcox, marrying in Madrid on 3 February 1863. Rafael was then sent to London in diplomatic mission. Thus, the couple moved into the house of Josefina's own grandfather, situated on Devonshire Place, 21, where their five children were born: Alfonso, also a diplomat; Rafael, a Roman-Catholic cardinal and Secretary of State to St. Pius X; Pedro, María and Domingo. His elder brother Alfonso was the first Marquess of Merry del Val (b. 1864) and Spanish ambassador to the United Kingdom between 1913 and 1931.

== Education ==
Merry del Val lived in England until 1878. His mother's family owned a large villa in Boscombe, a suburb of Bournemouth. He attended a Jesuit preparatory school in Bournemouth at the time the Society was establishing what were to become five parishes and a school. He received his first Holy Communion at Sacred Heart Church on Richmond Hill, and later enrolled at the northern seminary of Ushaw College in County Durham, in northern England. He was ordained a priest on 30 December 1888 after receiving a doctorate in philosophy at the Pontifical Gregorian University. He later received a doctorate in theology and then a licentiate in canon law.

== Domestic prelate, archbishop and cardinal ==
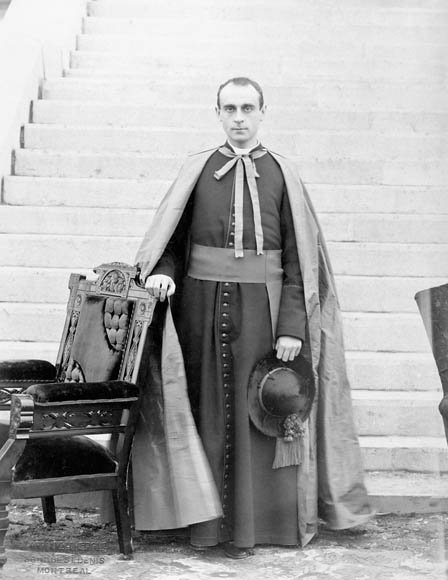
Rafael Merry del Val, 1897

In 1891 he became a privy chamberlain and member of the Pontifical family, having served as a secretary in nunciatures. Entrusted by Leo XIII with the question of the validity of Anglican orders, he led the Holy See to the negative response in September 1896 with the bull Apostolicae curae, of which he was the main architect. On the basis of this bull, Leo XIII confirmed the "nullity" of the "ordinations carried out with the Anglican rite", denying the apostolic succession of Bishops of the Church of England.

His continued service in diplomatic posts and in the Roman Curia saw him named Apostolic Delegate to Canada and domestic prelate in 1897 and then president of the Pontifical Academy of Ecclesiastical Nobles (an institution connected to the Roman Curia, in charge of the formation of priests who are to serve in the Diplomatic Corps of the Holy See) in 1899. He was appointed Titular Archbishop of Nicaea on 19 April 1900 and consecrated a bishop by Mariano Rampolla del Tindaro, Cardinal Secretary of State of Pope Leo XIII. In 1902 he was the papal representative to the coronation of Edward VII and Alexandra, accompanied by Eugenio Pacelli.

He served as secretary of the conclave of 1903 that elected Pope Pius X. By a coincidence, the secretary of the Sacred Consistorial Congregation, who was also the secretary of the College of Cardinals and therefore of the conclave, had died almost at the same time as Leo XIII. In haste, the cardinals chose as his successor Merry del Val, who had been ordained a bishop only three years before. The choice had been made from a pool of three names. The two rejected candidates were the substitute for General Affairs of the Secretariat of State, Giacomo Della Chiesa, and Pietro Gasparri, then serving as the secretary for Extraordinary Ecclesiastical Affairs. The preference shown to the youngest and least experienced of the three was interpreted as the first defeat of the Rampolla coalition, and a foreshadowing of what would happen at the conclave.

== Austrian veto at papal conclave ==
According to Merry del Val, during the conclave of 1903, in which he served in the role of Secretary of the Conclave, Cardinal Jan Puzyna de Kosielsko of Kraków came to see him, demanding to announce his veto (jus exclusivae) against Cardinal Mariano Rampolla in the name of Emperor Franz Joseph I of Austria-Hungary. Merry del Val protested and refused even to accept the document, which in the heat of the debate fell onto the floor and was picked back up by Puzyna. Puzyna announced the veto anyway, in the presence of the cardinals gathered in the Sistine Chapel. The College of Cardinals was outraged. Rampolla, according to Merry del Val, actually gained votes after the veto. Yet later, Merry del Val opined to the historian Ludwig von Pastor that Rampolla would never have had a chance of being elected even if the veto had not been announced, because the cardinals wanted a new direction after the pontificate of Pope Leo XIII, and Rampolla had been permanently associated with that pontificate. (Note: Papal historian Valérie Pirie also claims that Rampolla would never have won in the conclave and all that the veto accomplished was to make him appear a sympathetic figure as a victim of Austrian hostility.) After his election, the new Pope Pius X decreed an automatic excommunication for anyone trying to influence a conclave with a threat or veto.

== Cardinal Secretary of State ==
Styles of Rafael Merry del Val
- Reference style: His Eminence
- Spoken style: Your Eminence
- Informal style: Cardinal

After a two-month trial period, Pius X named Merry del Val pro-Secretary of State. That November he became the first cardinal elevated by the Pope (a traditional reward to the secretary of a conclave), becoming Cardinal-Priest of Santa Prassede and full Secretary of State, in place of Rampolla, who was moved to the post of Secretary of the Holy Office.

The praise which Merry del Val received from the Pope on 11 November 1903, the day he received the cardinal's hat, went as follows: "The good odor of Christ, lord cardinal, that you have spread in every place, even in your temporary dwelling, and the many works of charity to which you have dedicated yourself constantly in your priestly ministry, especially in this our city of Rome, have won for you, with admiration, universal esteem."

From Pascendi Dominici gregis (published in 1907) until 1914, Merry del Val was pro-active in combatting modernism among the clergy, especially the university professors. Nevertheless, he avoided an official canonical acknowledgement of Sodalitium Pianum (in France known as "La Sapinière") and kept a certain distance from the extensive activities of Umberto Benigni; in this attitude he was supported by voices from Germany protesting against an "integralist conspiracy". In 1911, Sodalitium Pianum departed of its own volition from the structure of the Secretariat of State. Church historian Roger Aubert has stated that Merry del Valls' conservative views, as well as his opposition to ecumenism and to establishing dialogue between the different Christian churches, might have reinforced the ideological positions of Pope Pius X.

Among Merry del Val's diplomatic achievements was the signing of a concordat with Serbia barely four days before the assassination of Archduke Franz Ferdinand, the Austrian heir-apparent, in Sarajevo on 28 June 1914 plunged Europe into the First World War. Merry del Val recorded that the "breakthrough" in the difficult negotiations with Belgrade came on the Feast of the Sacred Heart. The Pope and his Cardinal Secretary of State were fully aware that war was imminent. Pius X had already warned a departing Brazilian Ambassador a year earlier that Europe would not "get through 1914" without a major conflagration.

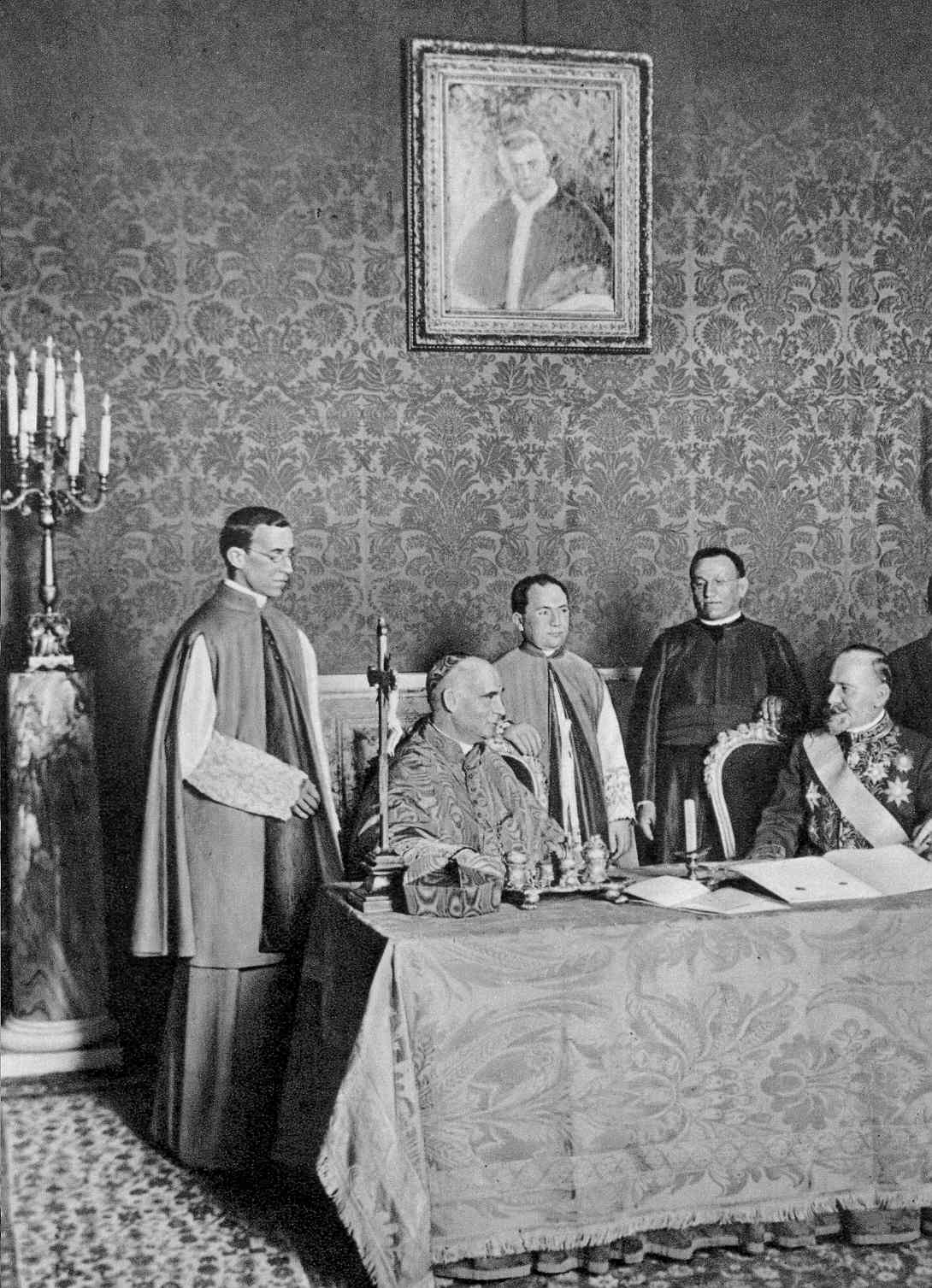
Eugenio Pacelli (later Pope Pius XII), Merry del Val and Nicola Canali at the 1914 signing of the Serbian concordat under a portrait of Pope Pius X.

Merry del Val remained Secretary of State throughout the pontificate of Pius X, but when Pope Benedict XV, an old associate of Rampolla, was elected in the conclave of 1914, Merry del Val was not reappointed. Benedict XV in fact appointed as his Cardinal Secretary of State, first Domenico Ferrata, who died almost immediately, and then Pietro Gasparri. Thus at the head of the Church were the two bishops, della Chiesa (now Pope Benedict XV) and Gasparri, who had been leapfrogged by Merry del Val on the eve of the conclave in 1903. But Benedict XV appointed Merry del Val as secretary of the Supreme Sacred Congregation of the Holy Office on 14 October 1914.

For a man who had been an exceptionally young Secretary of State, the Congregation was considered a lesser though important assignment. The Pope did not appoint Merry del Val as Prefect, because at the time the Popes themselves were Prefects of the Holy Office. The post of Secretary was then the highest-ranking office in the Dicastery.

Merry del Val as secretary was responsible for running the daily affairs of the Holy Office, in which capacity he reportedly explained the Papal policy of non possumus to Theodor Herzl and the emerging movement of Zionism, saying that as long as Jews denied Christ's divinity, the Church could not make a declaration in their favor. When the British Catholic diplomat Mark Sykes visited Merry del Val to speak about the same topic, the Cardinal was somewhat more supportive. He told Sykes that the Holy See would look benignly on the project.

Historian Jean Meyer has remarked Merry del Valls' reactionary and anti-Judaic views. Merry del Val was convinced of the irreconcilable hostility between Christians and Jews, and he also believed that Jews committed ritual murders against Christians. As Secretary of the Congregation of the Holy Office, on 2 April 1928 he ordered the abolition of the Opus sacerdotale Amici Israel.

After the death of Benedict XV (22 January 1922), Merry del Val was retained by Pius XI in the role of Secretary of the Holy Office, which he held until 26 February 1930, when he died unexpectedly in Vatican City, aged 64, during an operation for appendicitis. The funeral took place in St Peter's Basilica on 3 March 1930 and the Cardinal was buried in the crypt. On 31 July 1931, a new tomb, gift of the Spanish government, was dedicated by Cardinal Eugenio Pacelli, the future Pope Pius XII.

== Beatification process ==
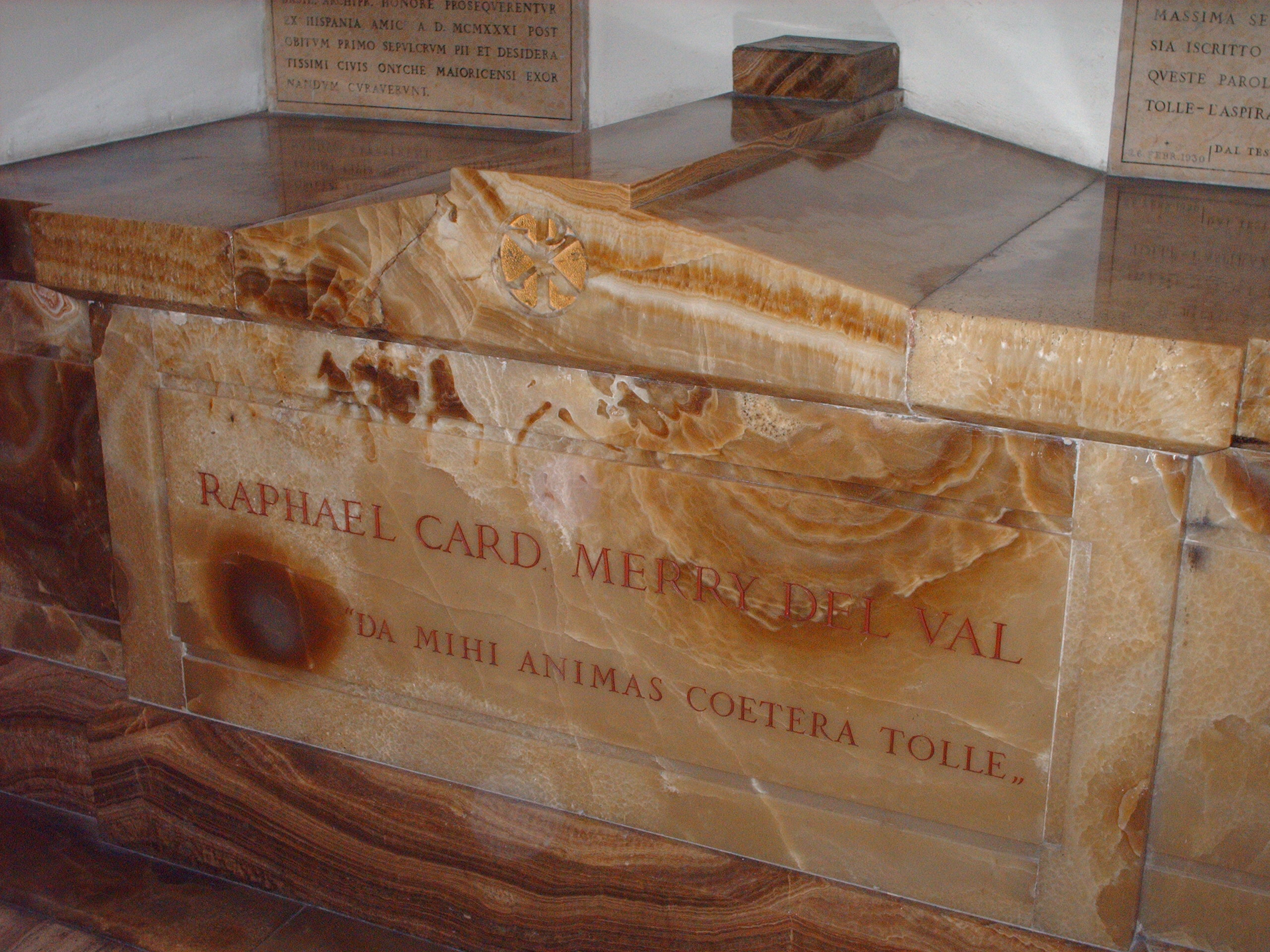
Cardinal Merry del Val's tomb in the Vatican grottoes, Saint Peter's Basilica.

The cause of Merry del Val's beatification was introduced on 26 February 1953 under the pontificate of Pope Pius XII. He therefore has the honorific title Servant of God.

== Honours ==
- Belgium (1906) - Grand Cordon in the Order of Leopold.

== Works (partial list) ==
- The Truth of Papal Claims. St. Louis, MO. 1902.
- Memories of Pope Pius X. Westminster, Md: The Newman Press. 1951.
- The Spiritual Writings of Raphael Cardinal Merry del Val. Gracewing Publishing. 2009. ISBN 978-0852441220.

== Citations ==
Catholic Church titles
Preceded by Mariano Rampolla del Tindaro	Cardinal Secretary of State; 12 November 1903 – 20 August 1914	Succeeded by Domenico Ferrata
Preceded by George Conroy	Apostolic Delegate to Canada and Newfoundland; 12 November 1903 – 20 August 1914	Succeeded by Diomede Falconio
Preceded by Mariano Rampolla del Tindaro	Archpriest of St. Peter's Basilica; 12 January 1914 – 26 February 1930	Succeeded by Eugenio Pacelli
Preceded by Domenico Cardinal Ferrata	Secretary of the Supreme Sacred Congregation of the Holy Office; 14 October 1914 – 26 February 1930	Succeeded by Donato Cardinal Sbarretti
