= Eugenio Espinosa de los Monteros =

Spanish military officer and diplomat (1880–1954)

General Eugenio Espinosa de los Monteros
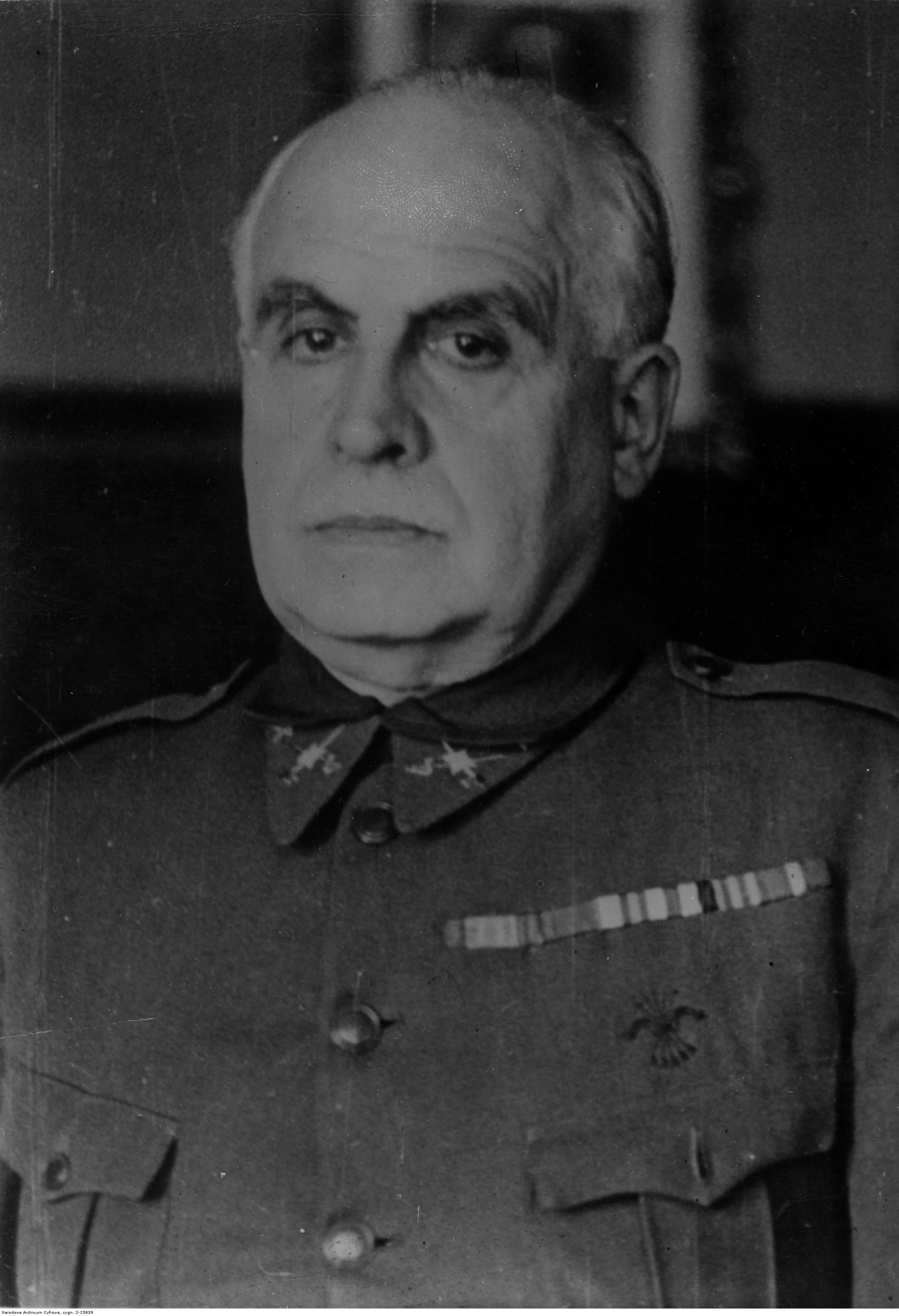
- Eugenio Espinosa de los Monteros as Ambassador to Germany in 1940
- Born: Eugenio Espinosa de los Monteros y Bermejillo; 28 October 1880; Madrid, Kingdom of Spain
- Died: 16 February 1954 (aged 73); Madrid, Spanish State
- Spouse: María del Carmen Dato y Barrenechea (m. 1904; died 1938)
- Relatives: Carlos Espinosa de los Monteros y Sagaseta de Ilurdoz (father); Carlos Espinosa de los Monteros y Bermejillo (brother)
- Military career
- Allegiance: Kingdom of Spain (1894–1931); Spanish Republic (1931–1936); Nationalist Spain (1936–1946)
- Branch: Spanish Army
- Service years: 1894–1946
- Rank: Divisional general
- Commands: Superior War School; I Army Corps; Military Governor of Madrid; VIII Military Region; Captaincy General of the Balearic Islands; VI Military Region
- Conflicts: Cuban War of Independence; Spanish Civil War
- Awards: Grand Cross (with White Decoration) of Naval Merit
- Other work: Spanish ambassador to Germany (1940–1941)

Eugenio Espinosa de los Monteros y Bermejillo (28 October 1880 – 16 February 1954) was a Spanish military officer and diplomat. A staff officer, he served as commander of the Superior War School in Madrid on several occasions. Following the Spanish coup of July 1936 and subsequent outbreak of the Spanish Civil War, he fled to the Nationalist zone, where he held various political and military posts. His forces were the first to enter Madrid at the end of the war. During World War II he was a Spanish ambassador to Germany, a position he held between 1940 and 1941.

== Biography ==
=== Early years and military career ===
Espinosa de los Monteros was born on 28 October 1880, into a family with military tradition. He was the son of military officer and ambassador Carlos Espinosa de los Monteros y Sagaseta de Ilurdoz and aristocrat María de los Dolores Bermejillo y García-Menocal. Younger brother of Carlos Espinosa de los Monteros y Bermejillo, in his youth he lived and studied in Vienna, where his father was posted as a military attaché to Austria-Hungary. There he learned German. In 1894 he entered the Toledo Infantry Academy, from which he graduated at the age of 15; he left with his older brother Carlos for Cuba, where they participated in various battles of the Cuban War of Independence, in which they received recognition for their bravery. He completed his studies to become a General Staff officer, eventually joining the General Staff Corps. He was a gentilhombre de cámara con ejercicio to King Alfonso XIII.

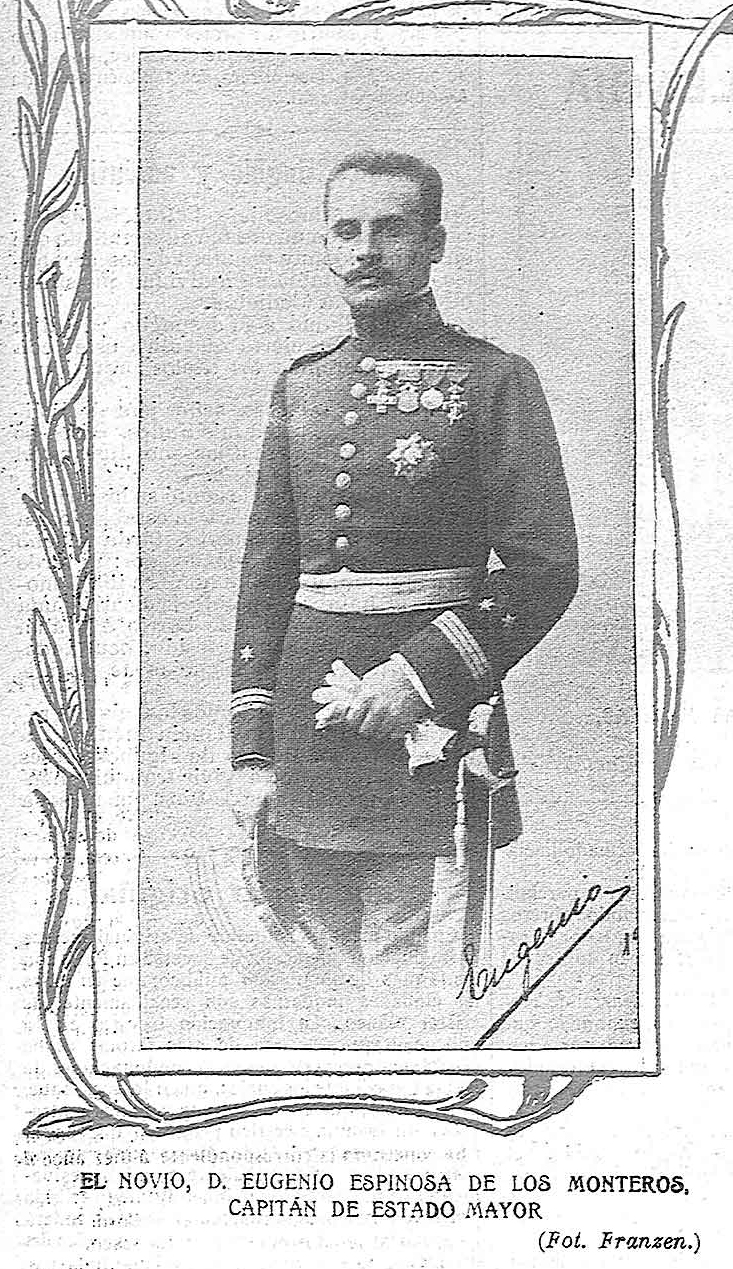
Espinosa de los Monteros in 1904, on his wedding day.

In November 1904 he married María del Carmen Dato and Barrenechea, 3rd Duchess of Dato, one of the daughters of politician Eduardo Dato, (Note: Dato served as President of the Council of Ministers (Prime Minister of Spain) on several occasions.) in Madrid; they had offspring.

He became secretary and director of the Madrid, Zaragoza and Alicante railway (MZA).

Following the proclamation of the Second Spanish Republic, he rose to the rank of brigadier general on 5 March 1934. He was Chief of Staff of the Third Army Inspection. On 13 June 1935, he was appointed head of the Superior War School, a position he held until the beginning of the Civil War.

=== Civil War and the capture of Madrid ===
In July 1936 he was in Madrid and took refuge in the French Embassy, from where he was evacuated and went to the Nationalist zone, where he held various positions. On 8 February 1938, he was appointed Under-Secretary of Foreign Affairs in the first government of Francisco Franco, serving under foreign minister Francisco Gómez-Jordana Sousa. Due to his position as undersecretary, he held a position on the Ministry's Cultural Relations Board. Together with Joaquín Rodríguez de Gortazar, he led the Spanish delegation to Nazi Germany that went to the Nuremberg rally in 1938 (the 10th NSDAP Congress). He resigned as under-secretary of Foreign Affairs in March 1939.

In February 1939 he was appointed commander of the Francoist I Army Corps, which forces were besieging the capital of Spain. Coinciding with the end of the conflict, on March 29 of that year his troops were the first to occupy Madrid. He later served as military governor of Madrid and director of the Superior War School. On 11 October 1939, he was appointed head of the VIII Military Region, based in A Coruña.

Between April and August 1939, as commander of the Francoist I Army Corps and first military governor of Madrid, he organized repression and numerous executions in the city. There is no evidence that he participated in the death sentence imposed on the Thirteen Roses, which was handed down by the Ninth Permanent War Council on August 3, 1939, two days before the execution. This military tribunal was composed of Infantry Colonel Cerdeño Gurdich as president of the court martial, Captains Sigüenza Plata and Ruiz Feingenspan and Lieutenant Sarte Julia as members, and Captain García Marco as reporting member.

=== Ambassador to Germany ===
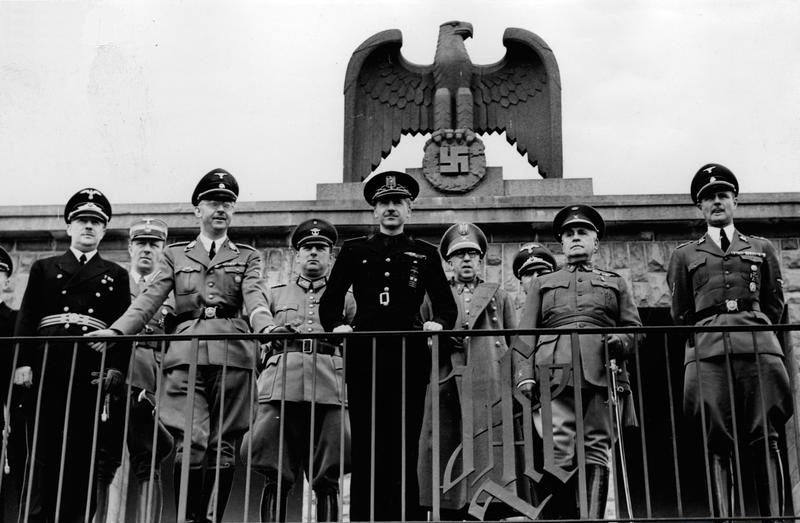
Spanish delegation in Berlin during a visit to the headquarters of the LSSAH in Lichterfelde, September 1940. Espinosa de los Monteros (second from the right) appears next to Sagardía Ramos, Serrano Suñer and Himmler.

In July 1940 he was appointed ambassador of Francoist Spain to Nazi Germany, as he spoke German. Espinosa de los Monteros replaced Admiral Antonio Magaz, who had come to hold some aversion towards Nazism. However, conflicts began to arise very early on. When Foreign Minister Ramón Serrano Suñer went on an official trip to Berlin in September, he did not even meet with Espinosa de los Monteros and kept him at a distance while the meetings with Nazi officials took place. A few months later, in November, this situation would happen again. German diplomats themselves also showed little interest in meeting with Espinosa de los Monteros.

In December 1940, Espinosa de los Monteros attempted to resign as ambassador, but was unsuccessful. As ambassador to Germany, he was part of the entourage that accompanied Francisco Franco to Hendaye on the occasion of his meeting with Adolf Hitler in October 1940, although he was not present at the talks between the two leaders. According to the memoirs of Heinz Linge, Hitler's chief of protocol and personal aide, it was Espinosa de los Monteros who, despite Franco's initial interest in entering World War II, advised against the proposal, thereby earning the enmity of the Nazi regime. However, due to strong disagreements with Serrano Suñer, he was eventually replaced as ambassador by José Finat in mid-1941.

=== Later career ===
He was appointed Captain General of the Balearic Islands on 13 August 1941, and later, in January 1942, Captain General of the VI Military Region, based in Burgos. It was rumored at the time that he was involved in a coup plot against Franco. At the end of March, General Espinosa de los Monteros, during his inauguration at the Captaincy General in Burgos, harshly criticized Serrano Suñer—although without naming him directly—when recalling his time as Spanish ambassador in Berlin:

A period of bitterness began for me, caused by the disloyalty and boundless ambition of the person who, being my hierarchical superior, tried at all times to suffocate me in the Machiavellian atmosphere that constitutes the norm of his activities.

General Franco reacted by summarily dismissing Espinosa de los Monteros, although to "compensate" —"following the rule he always adopted when the struggles within the hegemonic bloc became uncontrollable, namely, punishing both sides in the fray"— he also dismissed Serrano Suñer's secretary and then head of the Servicio Exterior de Falange, Felipe Ximénez de Sandoval. Espinosa de los Monteros did not hold any other position during the following years.

Espinosa de los Monteros later became a member of the Supreme Council of Military Justice (CSJM) from 11 October 1945 to 29 October 1946, when he retired as a reserve officer after reaching the required age. He died in Madrid on 16 February 1954. (Note: Although some sources indicate that he died in 1953.)

== Bibliography ==
- Bringmann, Tobias C. (2001). Handbuch der Diplomatie 1815–1963 Auswärtige Missionschefs in Deutschland und deutsche Missionschefs im Ausland von Metternich bis Adenauer (in German). K.G. Saur Verlag. ISBN 3-598-11431-1.
- Bowen, Wayne H. (2000). Spaniards and Nazi Germany: Collaboration in the New Order. University of Missouri Press.
- Bowen, Wayne H. (2006). Spain During World War II. University of Missouri Press.
- Bowen, Wayne H. (2009). "Spanish Pilgrimages to Hitler's Germany: Emissaries of the New Order". The Historian. 71 (2): 258–279. doi:10.1111/j.1540-6563.2009.00237.x. ISSN 0018-2370.
- Cabanellas, Guillermo (1975). La guerra de los mil días: nacimiento, vida y muerte de la II República Española (in Spanish). Buenos Aires: Heliasta.
- de Atienza, Julio; de Cadenas, Vicente (1963). Grandezas y títulos del reino concedidos por S. M. el rey Alfonso XIII (in Spanish). Hidalguía.
- Delgado Gómez-Escalonilla, Lorenzo (2012). Imperio de papel: Acción cultural y política exterior durante el primer franquismo (in Spanish). Madrid: CSIC.
- Escudero, María A. (1994). El Instituto de Cultura Hispánica (in Spanish). Editorial Mapfre.
- García Pérez, Rafael (1994). Franquismo y Tercer Reich (in Spanish). Centro de Estudios Constitucionales.
- Heine, Hartmut (1983). La oposición política al franquismo. De 1939 a 1952 (in Spanish). Barcelona: Crítica. ISBN 84-7423-198-1.
- López-Morell, Miguel Ángel (2005). La Casa Rothschild en España (1812–1941) (in Spanish). Madrid: Marcial Pons. ISBN 84-95379-84-8.
- Matthäus, Jürgen; Bajohr, Frank (2015). The Political Diary of Alfred Rosenberg and the Onset of the Holocaust. Rowman & Littlefield.
- Merino, Julio (1985). La tragedia de los generales españoles, 1936 (in Spanish). Barcelona: Plaza y Janés.
- Montoliú, Pedro (2005). Madrid en la posguerra, 1939–1946: Los años de la represión (in Spanish). Madrid: Sílex. ISBN 84-7737-159-8.
- Núñez Calvo, Jesús Narciso (2004). General Varela. Diario de Operaciones, 1936–1939 (in Spanish). Almena Ediciones.
- Ortiz Villalba, Juan (2005). La Masonería y su persecución en España (in Spanish). Patronato del Real Alcázar.
- Payne, Stanley G. (1987). The Franco Regime, 1936–1975. Madison: The University of Wisconsin Press. ISBN 0-299-11070-2.
- Payne, Stanley G. (2008). Franco and Hitler. Spain, Germany, and World War II. New Haven and London: Yale University Press. ISBN 978-0-300-12282-4.
- Pike, D. W. (2011). France Divided: The French and the Civil War in Spain. Sussex Academic Press.
- Preston, Paul (1995) [1990]. The Politics of Revenge: Fascism and the Military in 20th-century Spain. Routledge.
- Thomas, Hugh (1976). Historia de la Guerra Civil Española (in Spanish). Barcelona: Círculo de Lectores. ISBN 84-226-0874-X.

Additional bibliography

- (in Spanish) Tusell Gómez, Javier; Queipo de Llano, Genoveva G. (1986), «El enfrentamiento Serrano Súñer-Eugenio Espinosa de los Monteros: el ministro de Exteriores, los militares y la entrada en la guerra mundial», Historia 16, Nº 128, pp. 29–38.

Diplomatic posts
Preceded by Antonio Magaz	Ambassador of Spain to Germany; 1940–1941	Succeeded by José Finat
