= José Núñez Iglesias =

Spanish diplomat and trade official

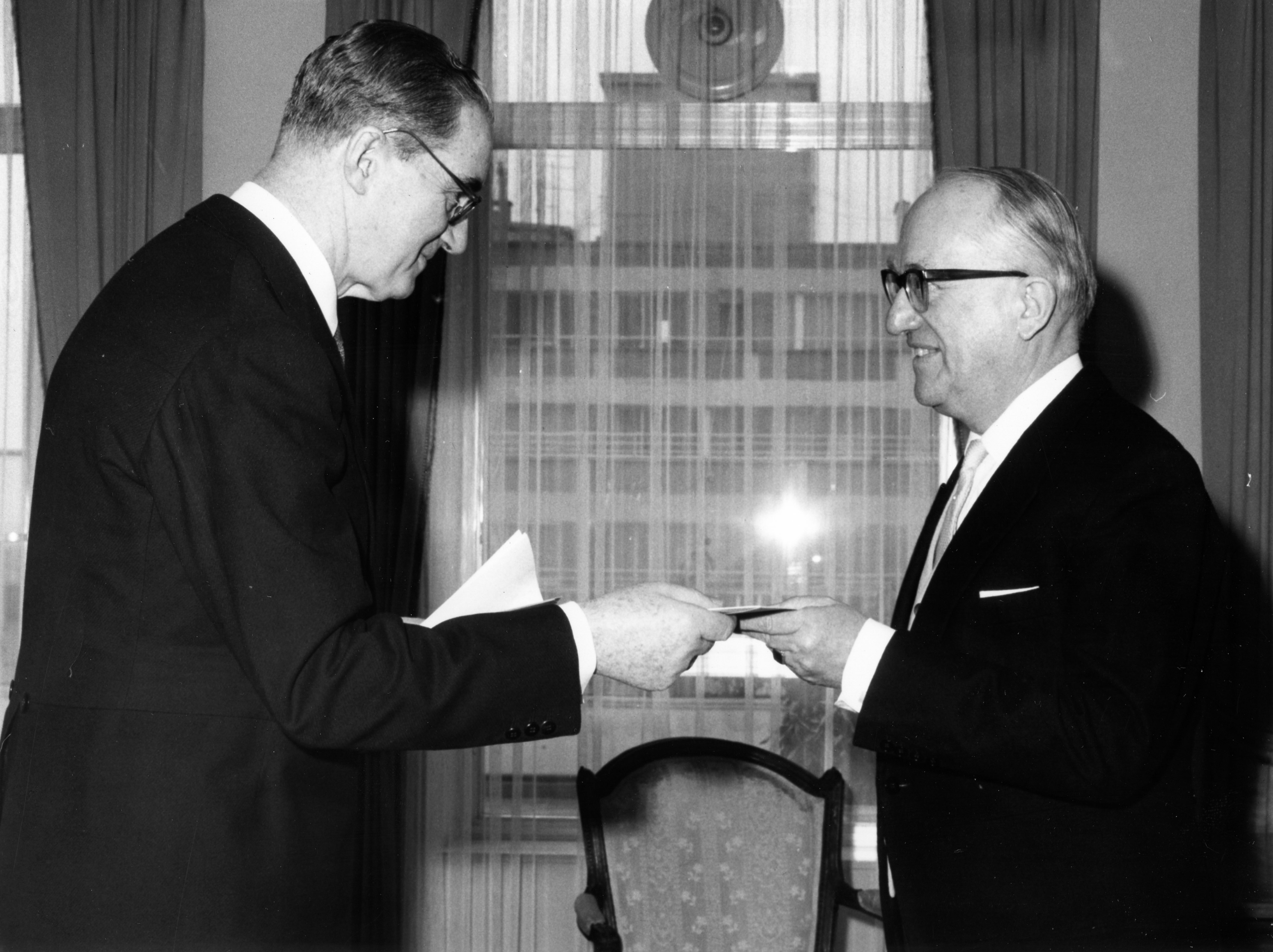
- Ambassador José Núñez Iglesias (left) presenting his diplomatic credentials to President Walter Hallstein

Councillor of State
- In office July 29, 1969 – April 17, 1972

Ambassador of Spain to Belgium
- In office November 21, 1964 – June 1967
- Preceded by: The Count of Casa Miranda
- Succeeded by: Jaime Alba Delibes

Ambassador-Head of the Permanent Mission of Spain to the OECE (later OECD)
- In office February 17, 1958 – November 21, 1964
- Preceded by: Jaime Argüelles y Armada (Head of the Spanish delegation to the OECE)
- Succeeded by: José Aragonés Vilá
Diplomatic posts
Ambassador of Spain to the European Communities
In office November 21, 1964 – October 8, 1965
Preceded by	The Count of Casa Miranda
Succeeded by	Alberto Ullastres
Ambassador of Spain to Luxembourg
In office April 3, 1965 – June 1967
Preceded by	The Count of Casa Miranda
Succeeded by	Jaime Alba Delibes
Ambassador of Spain to Ireland
In office August 20, 1954 – September 12, 1955
Preceded by	The Marquess of Miraflores
Succeeded by	Mariano de Yturralde y Orbegozo
Political posts
Under-Secretary for Foreign Economy
In office September 12, 1955 – October 31, 1957
Preceded by	Jaime de Argüelles y Armada
Succeeded by	Office abolished
Director-General for Economic Policy
In office July 13, 1950 – August 20, 1954
Preceded by	Mariano de Yturralde y Orbegozo
Succeeded by	Juan Schwartz Díaz-Flores
Director-General for Trade and Tariff Policy
In office June 15, 1948 – July 18, 1950
Preceded by	Luciano Albo Candina
Succeeded by	José Miguel Ruiz Morales

Personal details
- Born: March 19, 1897
- Died: December 9, 1984 (aged 87) Madrid, Spain

José Núñez Iglesias (19 March 1897 – 9 December 1984) was a Spanish diplomat and trade official.

== Biography ==
Núñez was born in 1897 and joined the diplomatic career in 1929, being first assigned to the Consulate-General in Mexico City. In October 1936, while still serving at the consulate, he was dismissed and expelled from the diplomatic corps by the Republican government, but would be reinstated by the rebel faction, which two years later appointed him second-class commercial attaché. In July 1939, reinstated in his position as second-class embassy secretary, he was appointed commercial attaché at the Embassy of Spain, Washington, D.C. In 1942 he was promoted to first-class commercial attaché and in 1945 he returned to Spain.

In Spain, he was appointed chief of staff to the Under-Secretary of Industry and, after serving ad interim for a few months, in June 1948 he was appointed as permanent director-general for Trade and Tariff Policy.

At the same time, he continued to rise in the diplomatic career and in July 1950 he was appointed as director-general for Economic Policy in the Ministry of Foreign Affairs. At this time, he was awarded the Grand Cross of the Order of Civil Merit.

In mid-1954 he was granted his first head of mission, being appointed ambassador to the Republic of Ireland, but was quickly called back to Spain to take over as Under-Secretary for Foreign Economy. After leaving this post at the end of 1957, he was appointed head of the Permanent Mission of Spain to the Organisation for European Economic Cooperation (OEEC), and later to the Organisation for Economic Co-operation and Development (OECD), serving until 1964, when he was ordered to replace the Count of Casa Miranda as ambassador of Spain in Belgium —with concurrence in Luxembourg — and to the European Communities. In 1962 he had been rewarded with the Grand Cross of the Order of Isabella the Catholic.

He left his diplomatic roles in mid-1967, when he reached the age of 70. After this, he was rewarded with a position on the Council of State, serving until 1972.

He died in Madrid on December 9, 1984.
