= Carlos de Miranda y Quartín, 4th Count of Casa Miranda =

Spanish diplomat (1895–1968)

The Count of Casa Miranda
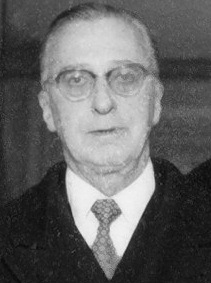

Ambassador of Spain to France
- In office November 11, 1964 – April 6, 1966
- Preceded by: The Count of Motrico
- Succeeded by: Pedro Cortina Mauri

Ambassador of Spain to Belgium
- In office February 25, 1951 – November 11, 1964
- Preceded by: Ángel Ossorio y Gallardo
- Succeeded by: José Núñez Iglesias

Under-Secretary of Foreign Affairs
- In office October 31, 1947 – April 1, 1951
- Preceded by: Tomás Suñer Ferrer
- Succeeded by: Emilio de Navasqüés

Ambassador of Spain to Egypt
- In office May 10, 1941 – December 25, 1947
- Preceded by: Gabriel Alomar Villalonga (Ángel Sanz Briz as chargé d'affaires)
- Succeeded by: Alonso Caro y del Arroyo
Other diplomatic posts
Ambassador of Spain to the European Communities
In office December 9, 1960 – November 11, 1964
Preceded by	Office established
Succeeded by	José Núñez Iglesias
Ambassador of Spain to Luxembourg
In office March 7, 1951 – November 11, 1964
Preceded by	Ángel Ossorio y Gallardo
Succeeded by	José Núñez Iglesias

Personal details
- Born: November 20, 1895 Madrid, Spain
- Died: April 14, 1968 (aged 72) Madrid, Spain

Carlos de Miranda y Quartín, 4th Count of Casa Miranda (20 November 1895 – 14 April 1968) was a Spanish diplomat and aristocrat.

== Biography ==
Miranda was born in Madrid in 1895. He joined the diplomatic corps in 1915. In 1935 he married María Teresa Elío y González de Amezúa, 4th Countess of Casa Real de la Moneda, with whom he had a son, Carlos Alonso de Miranda y Elío, 5th Count of Casa Miranda. In the 1920s he served as secretary of the Spanish legation in Stockholm and, in 1928, he was appointed chargé d'affaires in the Spanish legation in El Salvador. In February 1929 he was assigned to the Legation in Montevideo but, at the end of that month, he was posted to the Embassy in the Holy See.

In 1933 he was promoted to third-class plenipotentiary minister and ordered to return to Spain, in order to serve in the Ministry of State. At this point, he served as Chief of Protocol of the Ministry of State. Before the Civil War, the Republican government appointed him as chargé d'affaires and consul general of Spain in Sofia, but he was dismissed when he joined the rebel faction. The rebel government kept him in Sofia. In January 1936 he had been awarded the Cross of Military Merit for his assistance to the Army in the revolution of 1934.

In September 1940 he was appointed consul general in Tangier and in May 1941 he was designated Ambassador of Spain to Egypt. In 1943 he was promoted to second-class plenipotentiary minister and in 1947 he was appointed Under-Secretary of Foreign Affairs (at that time, second-highest position after the minister).

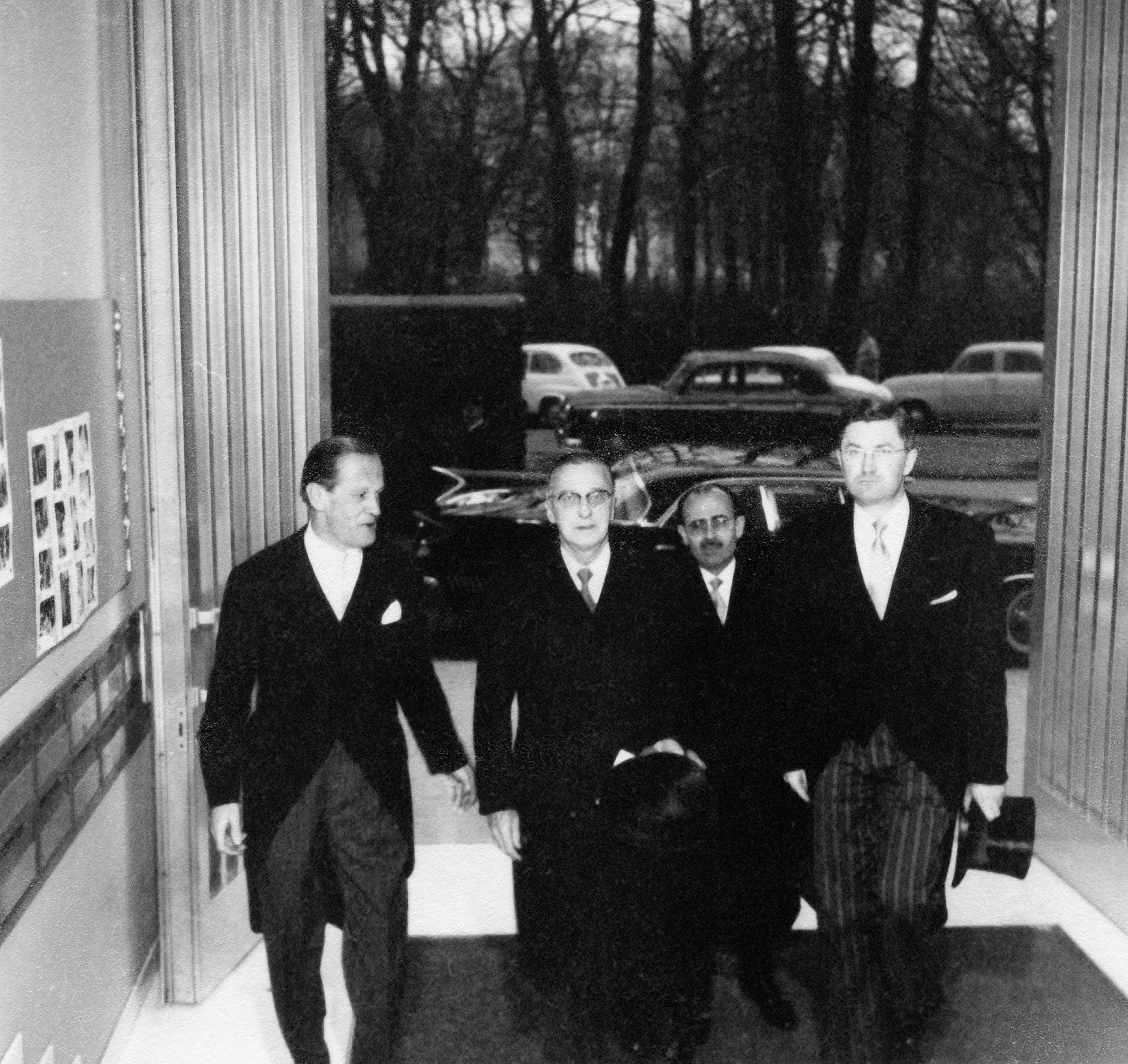
The Count arriving to the European Commission for the credentials ceremony. 1960

In 1950 he inherited the noble title of Count of Casa Miranda and the following year he was appointed Ambassador of Spain to Belgium and Luxembourg. During his time in Brussels, he also represented Spanish interests before the European Economic Community, the European Coal and Steel Community and the European Atomic Energy Community, acting as the first Ambassador of Spain to the European Communities (today known as Permanent Representative of Spain to the European Union). He also served as member of the Cortes Españolas from 1947 to 1951.

In 1955 he was promoted to the category of Ambassador and, after 13 years serving in Brussels, he was appointed Ambassador of Spain to France, a position he held until April 1966. During the "empty chair" conflict between France and the Hallstein Commission to increase the powers of the latter, the Count supported the French position and advised the Spanish government to get close to France and accused the Commission of "exceeding the scope of its functions and wanting to establish itself as a supranational authority with powers that only correspond to States".

He died on 14 April 1968, at the age of 72.
