= Germany–Spain relations =

- Germany: Spain

Diplomatic mission
- Embassy of Germany, Madrid: Embassy of Spain, Berlin

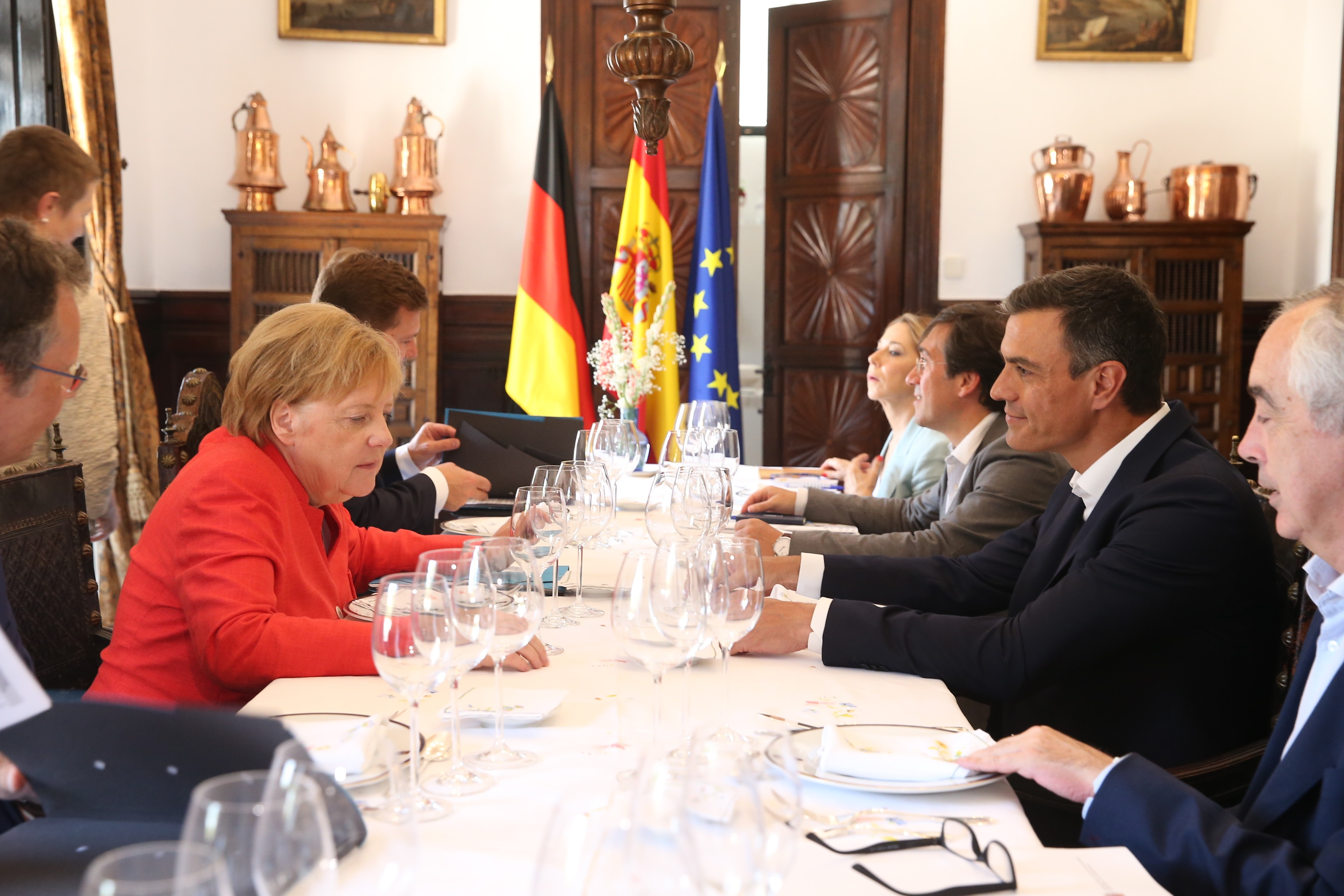
Angela Merkel and Pedro Sánchez

Germany and Spain maintain diplomatic relations – both nations are members of the European Union, Organisation for Economic Co-operation and Development, NATO and the United Nations.

== History ==
=== Antiquity ===
In ancient times, both Hispania and the western and southern parts of present-day Germany were under Roman rule. After the Migration Period of the late antiquity, German tribes also dominated areas on the Iberian Peninsula, creating the Kingdom of the Suevi (from 409) and the Visigothic kingdom (beginning with the second half of the 5th century). From 711, much of Spain came under Muslim Rule. Only Karl Martell, king of the Frankish Empire, which at that time included present French and German territories, was able to stop the Moorish advance from Spain into south-west France with the Battle of Tours. Only in the north of the Iberian peninsula were Christian rulers able to assert themselves. From there, in 722, began the Spanish Reconquista.

=== Alfonso X ===
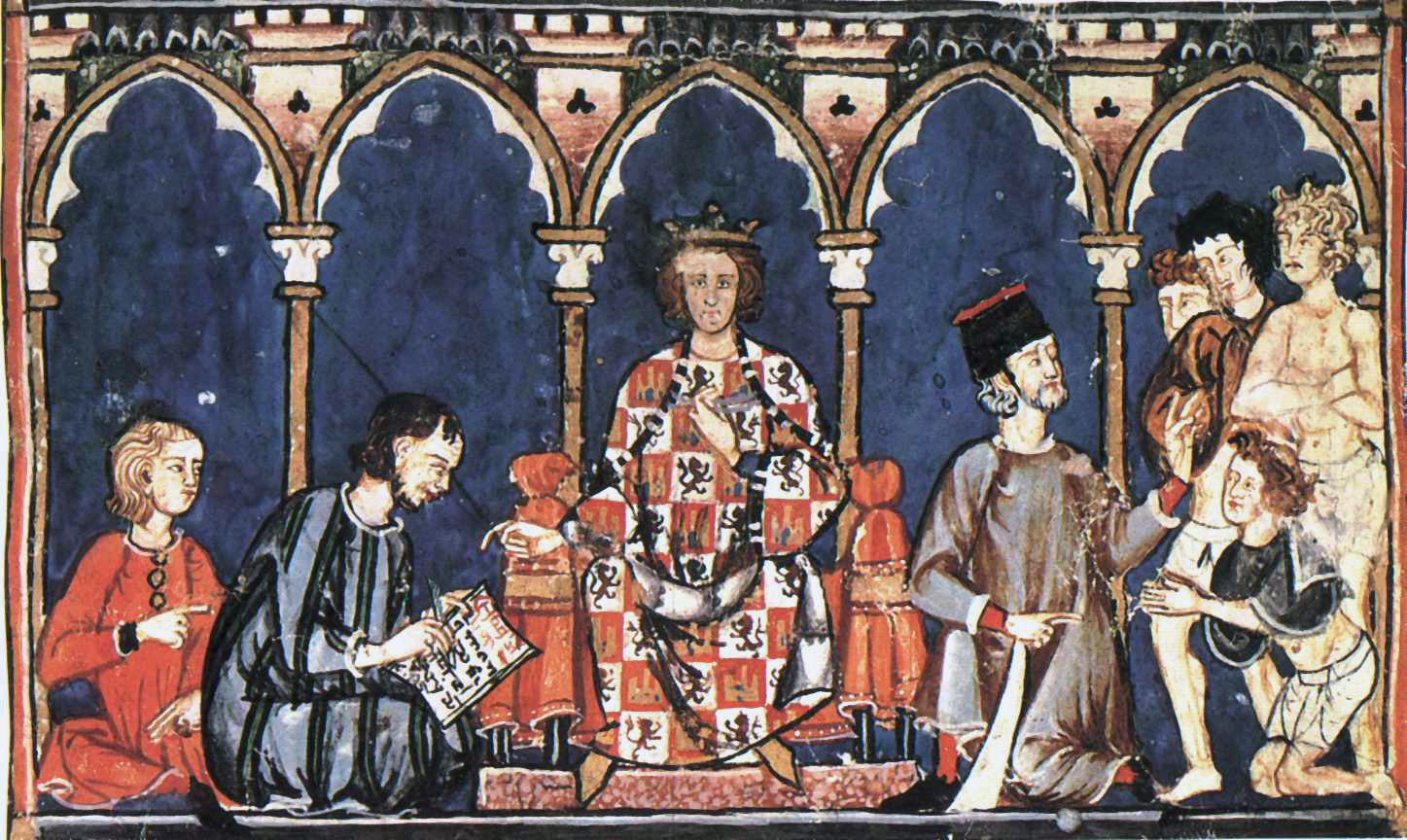
Alfonso X of Castile (illustration from the Libro de los juegos, 1251–1282)

Also Alfonso X, King of León and Castile from 1252 to 1282, led a crusade against the Moors.

This ruler was from 1257 to 1273 also King Counter-king of Holy Roman Empire, which was related to his mother: His descent from the German family of Hohenstaufen through his mother Elisabeth, a daughter of the king Philipp von Schwaben, gave him the right to represent the Swabian line. The election of Elector in 1257, after the death of William of Holland in 1256, in which he received the same number of votes (both three votes) as the opponent Richard of Cornwall, seduced him to aim for the prestigious Kaiser crown through the Roman-German kingship; However, this was never realized, because he could not raise the necessary money for a Romzug. In order to get money, he worsened the coins and then tried to control the price increase by an idiosyncratic tax system. The retail trade in its territory was ruined, and the citizens and peasants were badly damaged. The unanimous election Rudolf I of Habsburg to the Roman-German king in 1273 actually meant Alfonso's deposition as king of the Holy Roman Empire.

=== Karl V: "In my kingdom the sun never sets" ===
Reign of Charles V. 'Burgundy:' Castile 'Red:' Aragon's possessions 'Orange:' Burgundian possessions 'Yellow:' Austrian Hereditary Lands 'Pale yellow:' Holy Roman Empire

The Reconquista was completed by the Catholic Monarchs, Queen Isabella I of Castile and King Ferdinand II of Aragon in 1492. In the same year, the sailor Christopher Columbus reached America and laid the foundation stone for the Spanish Empire. The heir of Isabella, who died in 1504, was her son John, Prince of Asturias. He married Margaret of Burgundy in 1496, the daughter of the later German Maximilian I, Holy Roman Emperor, but died in 1497 without heirs. His younger sister Joanna married in 1497 the Habsburg Philip I of Castile (1478-1506), who was also a son of Maximilian I, Holy Roman Emperor, also Duke of Burgundy. However, after showing signs of "madness" in the eyes of her contemporaries, Ferdinand took over. With the death of Ferdinand, the eldest son of Joanna's marriage Charles fell to the Spanish heritage.

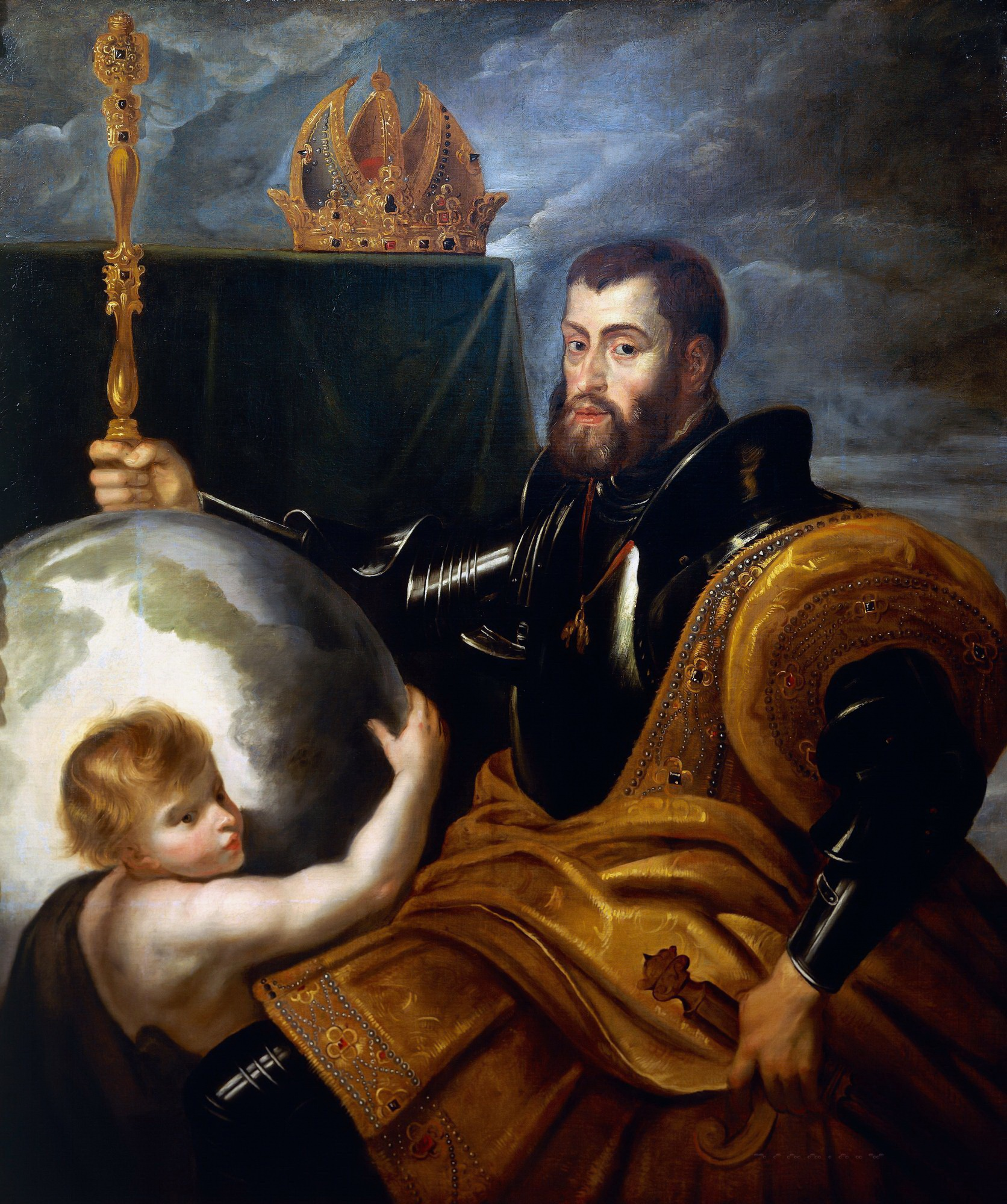
Emperor Charles V ruled over a global empire in which the sun never went down; painting by Rubens

To secure the heritage, Charles concluded the Treaty of Noyon in 1516 for understanding with France. In 1519, after his grandfather Maximilian had died, he was also struck by the Austrian - habsburg inheritance. He was elected Roman-German King and assumed the title "Chosen Emperor" at his coronation in 1520. Francis I of France and Henry VIII of England also applied for Maximilian's succession, and finally Friedrich von Sachsen, and Karl's brother Ferdinand was at times as a candidate in the conversation. The decisive factor was the financial support provided by the Fugger. The total cost of the election was 851,918 guilders, of which the Fuggers alone raised 543,585. In Spain, the Comuneros Uprising broke out against the reign of Karl, a foreigner, who had raised taxes to finance his wars. The insurrection was mainly supported by the bourgeoisie of the cities of Castile, in particular [Toledo]. He found support in parts of the clergy and the nobility. His goal was to limit the royal power in favor of Cortes. In the Kingdom of Valencia he came to a social revolutionary movement, the Germania. The rebels under Juan de Padilla were defeated at Villalar in 1521, the rebellion finally suppressed in 1522. After securing power, Spain became a central power base of the emperor.

=== Wars with France and the Ottomans (1521-1556) ===
At European level, the fighting between France and the Habsburgs was of great importance. For the Emperor it was dangerous, as the Pope and Venice tended increasingly to the side of France. In 1525 Charles' troops captured Francis I in the Battle of Pavia (1525). But Karl joined the proposals for a moderate peace. This led to the signing of the Treaty of Madrid in 1526, in which France relinquished its claims in northern Italy, Karl hoped to be able to persuade Franz to fight together against the Ottomans and against the Lutherans. But after Franz was released, he revoked the contract. He managed to win with the Holy League of Cognac from the Pope, Venice, Florence and finally even Milan allies.

=== Division of the Habsburg Empire, Philip II (1556-1598) ===
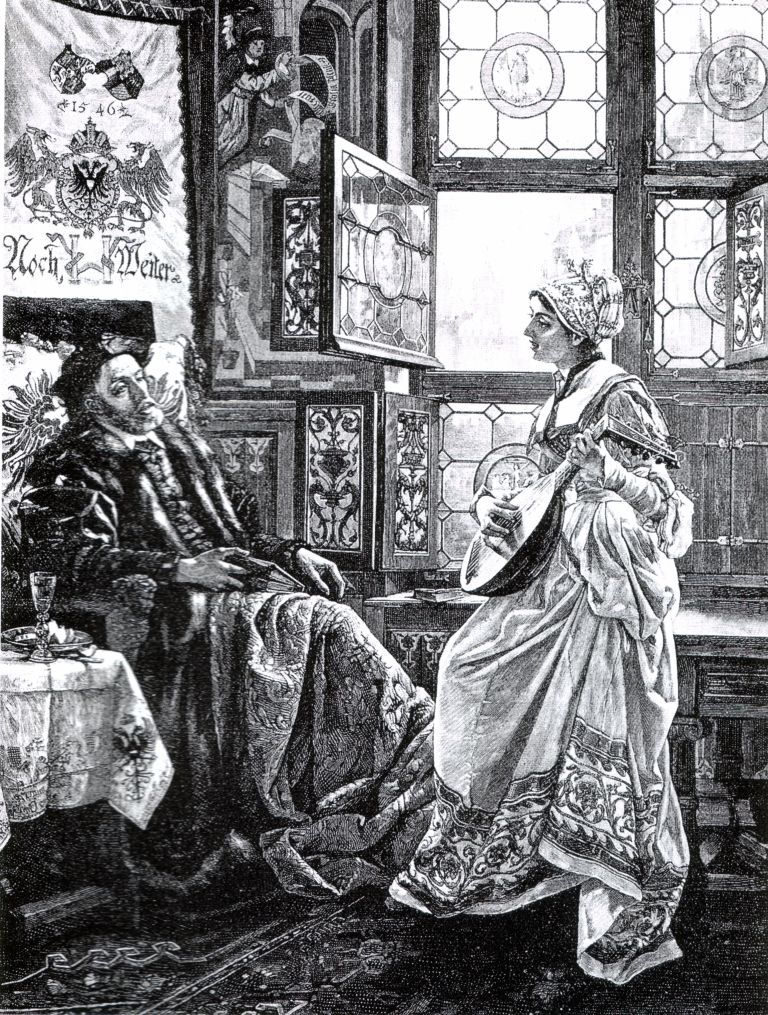
Barbara Blomberg with Emperor Charles V (wood engraving from 1894)

When Charles V put down the government in 1556, Spain lost the Austrian possessions of the House of Habsburg and the imperial crown, but retained the Netherlands, the Franche-Comté, the Duchy of Milan, and the kingdoms of Naples, Sicily, and Sardinia. In 1570 his son and successor, Philip II, married Anna of Austria (1549-1580), the mother of the heir apparent Philip.

In the 16th century, the Ottoman Empire was an expansive major power. Venice and Spain sent a common fleet into the eastern Mediterranean, which defeated the Turks in the Battle of Lepanto on 7 October 1571. Although Holy Roman Empire of the German Nation was not part of the Holy League, its Commander-in-Chief Juan de Austria, an extra-marital son of Emperor Charles V. and the bourgeois Regensburg he Gürtler s daughter Barbara Blomberg.

=== Spanish Succession War (1701-1714) ===
The extinction of the Spanish Habsburgs in 1701 triggered the Spanish Succession War. The Second Grand Alliance around the Austrian - Habsburg Emperor, the Holy Roman Empire, England and Great Britain and the Netherlands fought against France and its allies the Electorate of Cologne, Savoy and the Electorate of Bavaria. The war took an unfavorable turn for Habsburg with the death of Joseph I. Nevertheless, the Austrian house of Habsburg had become under Leopold I and Joseph I a great European power. In the end, France succeeded in establishing Philip V as king of Spain. Thus the Dynasty of Bourbon, which still reigns today, was founded in Spain. Almost all the powers involved in the war had achieved at least partial successes at the end of the war.

=== 19th century ===
Leopold von Hohenzollern: Spanish succession disputes lead to the Franco-Prussian War.
In 1869, the Spanish Cortes proclaimed a new constitution that envisaged a parliamentary monarchy as a form of government. A promising royal candidate was Prince Leopold of Hohenzollern-Sigmaringen, scion of a Catholic branch line of Hohenzollern. He was persuaded in the spring of 1870 by Otto von Bismarck to accept the candidature. Soon Leopold resigned from his candidacy, as France threatened war. The French objection to Leopold or the French demand "that S. Maj. The [Prussian] king committed himself for all future, never to give his consent again, if the Hohenzollern should come back to their candidature" - as that of Otto edited by Bismarck and thus deliberately pointed Emser Depesche, led to the German-French War. The victory of Prussia and its allies resulted in 1871 in the German Unification.

Reich Chancellor Bismarck described the German Reich as "saturated" in order to be able to insert the new power factor in Europe's center into the Concert of the Powers but Kaiser Wilhelm II, German Emperor from 1888 to 1918, demanded "a place in the sun" for the Germans. This world power policy brought Germany came into conflict with Spain in the Asian Pacific region over its plans to colonize some Micronesian islands claimed by Spain, even though it was a declining power and had already lost most of its American colonies in the Spanish American wars of independence. With Spain's loss in the Spanish American War they ceded their last American colonies (Cuba and Puerto Rico) to the United States along with the Asian colonies of the Philippines and Guam island. In 1898 the Spanish Empire tried to recover from the war by selling its remaining Pacific island colonies to the German Empire, ending with the German–Spanish Treaty (1899) by which Spain relinquished the Carolines, the northern Mariana Islands and Palau to Germany. These South Pacific areas became part of German New Guinea.

=== 20th century ===
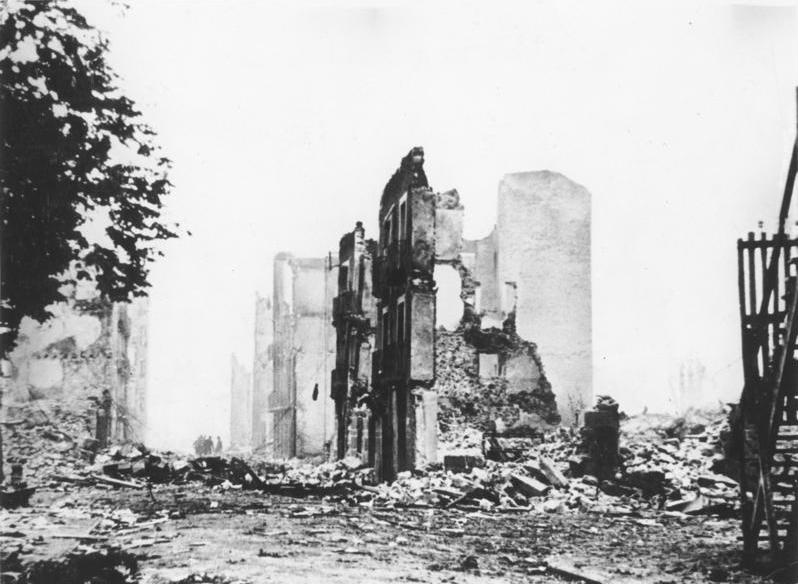
Ruins left by the bombing of Guernica in 1937, the 'Operation Rügen'.

During World War I (1914-1918), Spain remained neutral, while Germany and the other Central Powers lost the war against the Triple Entente. This led to the abdication of all German monarchs. A side effect of the German defeat was that Germany failed as a rival of Spain in the struggle for colonial possessions in Morocco. The brothers Mannesmann had possession in the Moroccan Rif area, which corresponded to about an eighth of the territory.

During the Rif War (1921–1926), the Spaniards tried to extend their rule to the entire colonial territory in northern Morocco. It was at the initiative of the king, who wanted to exterminate the Rif Kabyles, that poison gas from the German Munsterlager- Gasplatz Breloh - was used against the Rif Kabyles from October 1921. It was not until July 1927 that they had subjugated the entire area.

The inter-war period was associated with great uncertainty and instability for most European countries. Democratic ideas were threatened on the right by fascist and on the left by communist ideologies. While in Germany, which had been hit hard by the Treaty of Versailles, the Weimar Republic struggled to establish itself, Spain saw the dictatorship of General Miguel Primo de Rivera (1923–1930) and the proclamation of the Second Spanish Republic in 1931.

After the July 1936 attempt at a coup d'état in Spain led to the start of the Spanish Civil War (1936-1939), Nazi Germany and Fascist Italy sided with the rebels and supplied them with money, munitions and manpower, including the intervention of the Condor Legion.

==== Spanish Civil War ====
Adolf Hitler sent the Condor Legion to Spain to assist General Francisco Franco and his Nationalist forces. He also sent large quantities of arms and naval support. This German involvement proved crucial to Franco's Nationalists winning the conflict.

On the side of the Republicans, International Brigades, including Germans, fought against Franco's forces. Most Germans fought in the Edgar André Battalion (or "Hans-Bataillon"), the Hoffmann-Group (came from Germany Group around General Hoffmann) the Thaelmann Group (group around Arthur Pfeiffer) and the Centuria Thälmann, formed by Hans Beimler, unit in the Maxim Gorki Battalion, PSUC - Division Carlos Marx (later Thälmann Battalion).

Members of the international POUM militia also fought for members of Trotskyist, left-socialist and opposition communist groups such as the German SAP and KPO. Famous personalities like George Orwell and the later Social Democrat Member of Parliament Peter Blachstein fought in the POUM militia units. In the Málaga–Almería road massacre on the fleeing population of the city in February 1937 about 10,000 people were murdered. In the concentration camps, medical experiments were also carried out on the prisoners with National Socialist support.

In February 1939 there were nearly 500,000 civil war refugees. They were initially interned mostly in the south of France. More than half returned to Spain in the next few months. In France remained about 150,000, many of them were sent as prisoners of war in different main camp and since August 6, 1940, in the Mauthausen concentration camp. More than 7,000 Spanish prisoners lived there, 5,000 of whom died. Some Spaniards were extradited to Franco by the Gestapo, others, such as the former head of government Francisco Largo Caballero, were deported to various German concentration camps. When the last Republican forces had given up, Franco proclaimed victory on April 1, 1939, the Francoist dictatorship prevailed throughout Spain.

==== Non-belligerent during World War II ====
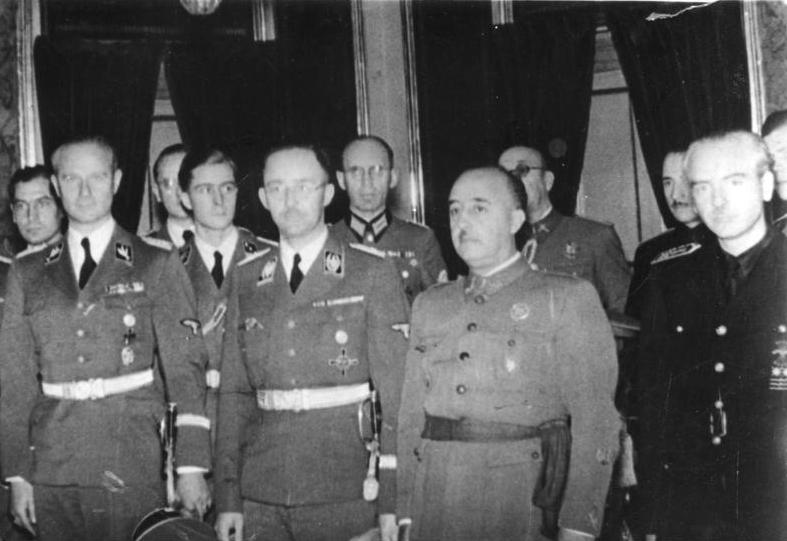
Reichsführer SS Heinrich Himmler with Karl Wolff at one Meeting with Franco in Spain, October 25, 1940

Franco unquestionably had sympathy for the regimes in Italy and Germany, but in practice, the solidarity with his alleged ideological allies was limited. He was more likely to associate business relations with those regimes than an ideological community of fate. Spain joined the Anti-Comintern Pact in March 1939. Franco declared in July 1940 that his country was not neutral but merely a war leader.

In a letter dated 6 February 1941, Hitler told Franco "that we three men, the Duce, you and me, are bound together by the hardest compulsion of history that is possible, and that thus we in this historical analysis ought to obey as the supreme commandment the realization that in such difficult times, not so much an apparently wise caution as the bold heart, rather, can save nations."

Characteristic of Franco's attitude to the Axis, however, is his behavior in Hendaye in 1940 (thus at the height of Nazi power in Europe) on the occasion of his only meeting with Hitler, when Franco not only demanded French colonial territory for Spain's entry into the war, but also refused to allow German troops into his country. According to his own statements, Franco is said to have even told Hitler that Spain will fight every invader to the last man, wherever he comes from. In addition, Franco demanded the supply of raw materials such as cotton and rubber, which Germany could hardly deliver. Franco, in spite of his superficial approval, finally closed Hitler's suggestion to occupy Gibraltar, which had long been demanded by Britain because that would have meant Franco's entry into the Second World War. His condolences finally consisted in sending the 'División Azul' 'to the Eastern Front, 47,000 Falangist volunteers under General Agustín Muñoz Grandes, but which he withdrew in 1943 after the Battle of Stalingrad there again. In addition, Franco provided Germany, inter alia, submarine bases and news material.

Hitler was dissatisfied with Franco's policy and in July 1942, in a small circle, began to consider "finding a suitable personality for the settlement of the Spanish political situation." He particularly thought of General Muñoz Grandes and said that the Blue Division might "play a crucial role in the settlement of the current Pfaff system." In December 1943, Franco issued his position to the German ambassador saying that "the attitude of the Spanish government towards Bolshevism and Communism would not change, and that this struggle would continue at home and abroad, as well as against Judaism and Freemasonry " More about the repression of Jews in the early Franco period see Bernd Rother: Of these Sephards, some had descendants of 1492 displaced Jews in the 1920s who can accept Spanish citizenship. Franco's involvement was limited to those Sephards, which were relatively small with 4,500 of 175,000 sephards. At the latest since 1944, Franco had been informed in detail about the extermination of the Jews in KZ Auschwitz and it turns out that he knew the exact extent of the annihilation.

The American historian Stanley G. Payne already sees withdrawal movements of Spain from Germany and Italy, even before the turn in Russia, as already at this time an article of a Falangist leader, in which Spain was differentiated from the totalitarian regimes, was allowed to print. In 1943, this idea became common knowledge, so that by the time the Second World War came to a close, Spain was well advanced on the path of transition from a partially mobilized, semi-fascist state to a Catholic, corporate and increasingly demobilized authoritarian regime."When Franco's defeat loomed around 1943, Franco withdrew from the Axis powers. He declared Spain neutral this year and, in exchange for allied oil supplies, largely cushioned Germany's material and non-material support. He also dismissed the sympathetic members of his government, including his brother-in-law Ramón Serrano Súñer. This shift allowed Franco to appease the Allies. In addition, during the Second World War, the abolition of external symbols such as the Fascist salute came. For Franco, Hitler and Mussolini were only interesting as long as they were powerful and he had something to expect from them. Another aspect, however, is that Spain, still severely weakened by the recent civil war, could not afford to participate in another gun campaign.

After the war, Spain was stationed on one of the so-called ratlines, the escape routes of the dignitaries of both the Nazi regime itself and its ideological allies - often for the purpose of traveling to South America. Some of them also found refuge in Spain itself, such as Léon Degrelle, leader of the Belgian Rexists.

==== Postwar ====
After the Second World War, the occupied and divided Germany initially fell out as a player on the international stage. After the victory of the western democracies, the Spanish dictatorship was naturally isolated, which would, however, be defused by the looming Cold War for Franco.

In 1955, Spain was admitted to the United Nations. In 1973, the German Democratic Republic followed as the 133rd and the Federal Republic of Germany as the 134th member. From the beginning of the 1960s, Franco sought an association agreement with the European Community. He submitted an application on February 9, 1962. It was only in 1966 that negotiations began, which were delayed until the conclusion of a first agreement in 1970, mainly because of political reservations of the six states (including the FRG).

=== After the end of the Spanish dictatorship ===
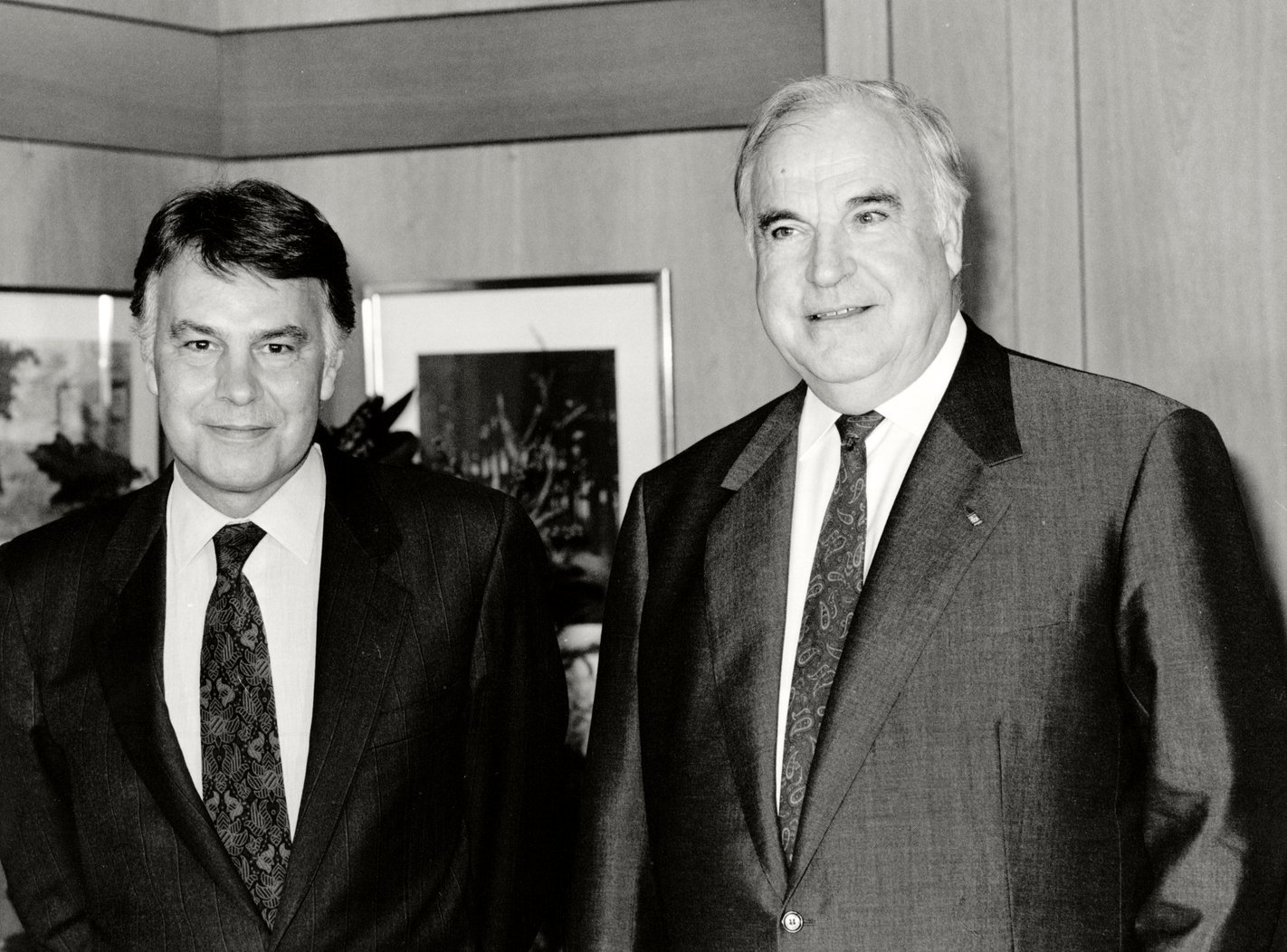
Felipe González and Helmut Kohl (1993)

The Spanish isolation could only be completely broken after Franco's death in 1975 and the subsequent democratization under King Juan Carlos I.

Spain joined the NATO in 1982; The Federal Republic of Germany belonged to the Atlantic Pact since 1955. In 1986 Spain became a member of the European Community and in 1988 the Western European Union. Spain also decided to use the Euro as the currency together with Germany and other European partners (1999 as book money, cash introduction 2002), so that no currency exchange between the two countries is necessary.

=== 21st century ===
In Iraq war in 2003, Spain joined the US despite the popular opposition of the "[Coalition of the Willing One]". Germany, together with Russia and France, refused to participate in the war on Saddam Hussein s. Foreign policy, however, Spain then approached again to Germany and France. Prime Minister Zapatero withdrew the troops from Iraq by July 2004, but he soon added to the military contingent in Afghanistan in view of the relations with the US damaged by the withdrawal until November 2013. 34 Spaniards died.

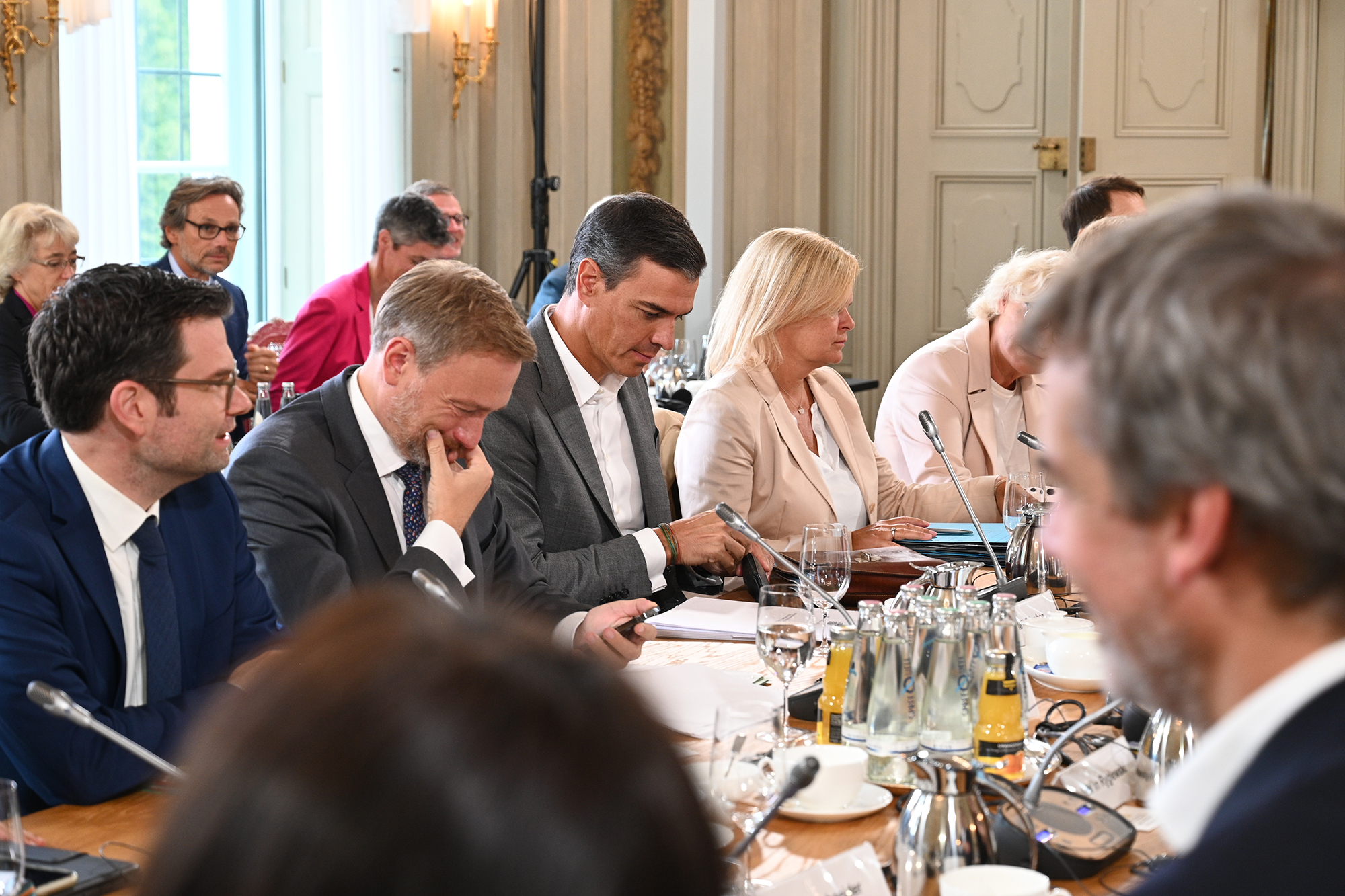
Pedro Sánchez (centre) at the German Cabinet meeting (2022)

The relations between the German Government and the Government of Spain are unencumbered. At the end of March 2018, Catalan politician Carles Puigdemont was arrested in Germany. The possibility of extradition was examined.

On 30 August 2022, in the wake of a visit of Spanish prime minister Pedro Sánchez to Germany and with the looming context of the ongoing energy crisis, German chancellor Olaf Scholz lent support to the construction of a gas pipeline (the so-called MidCat) connecting Spain (and Portugal) to France and the rest of the European mainland. Prime Minister Sánchez was also invited to a meeting of the German Cabinet by Chancellor Scholz.

== Resident diplomatic missions ==
- Germany has an embassy in Madrid, a consulates-general in Barcelona and consulates in Las Palmas, Málaga and in Palma de Mallorca.
- Spain has an embassy in Berlin and consulates-general in Düsseldorf, Frankfurt, Hamburg, Hannover, Munich and Stuttgart.
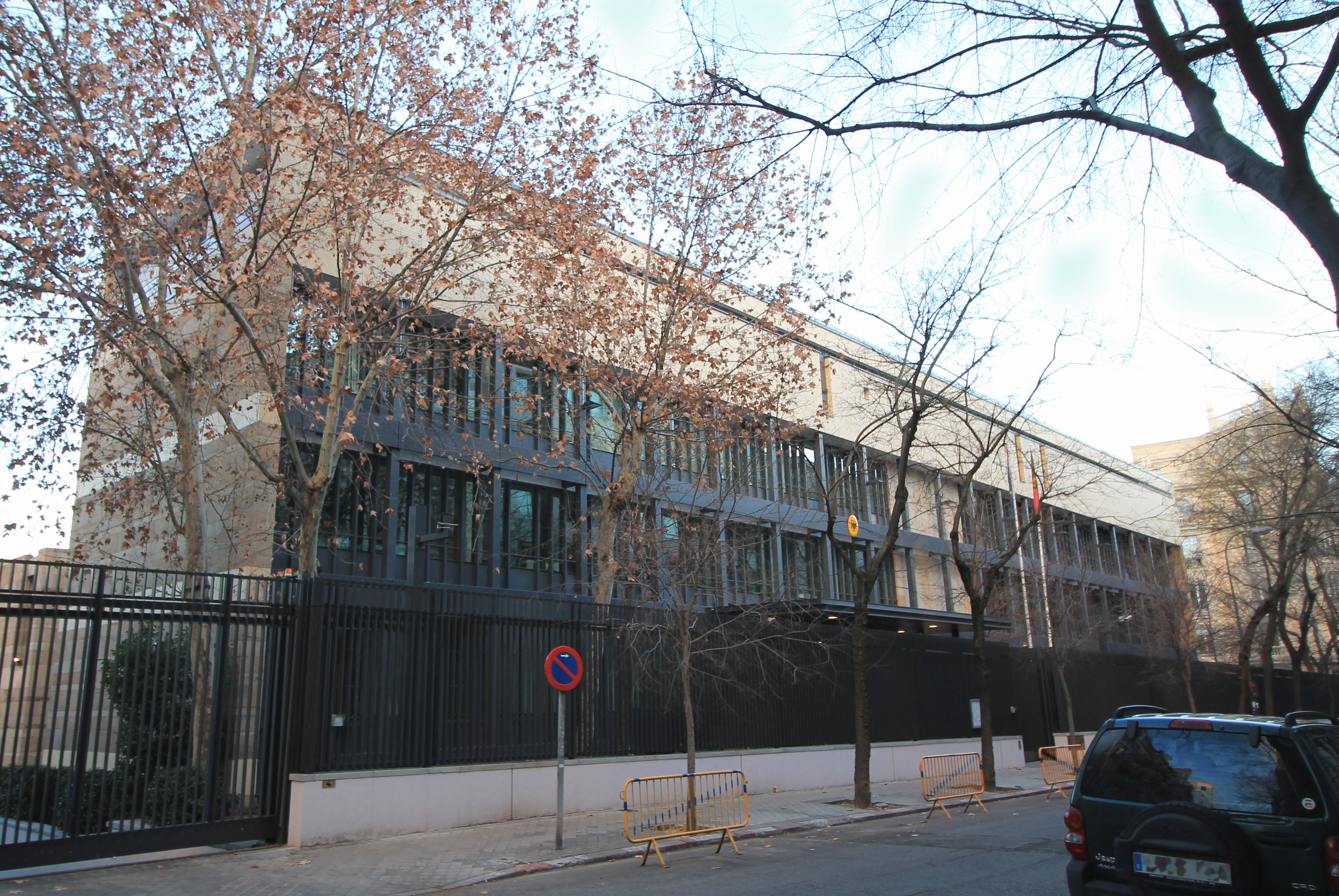
Embassy of Germany in Madrid

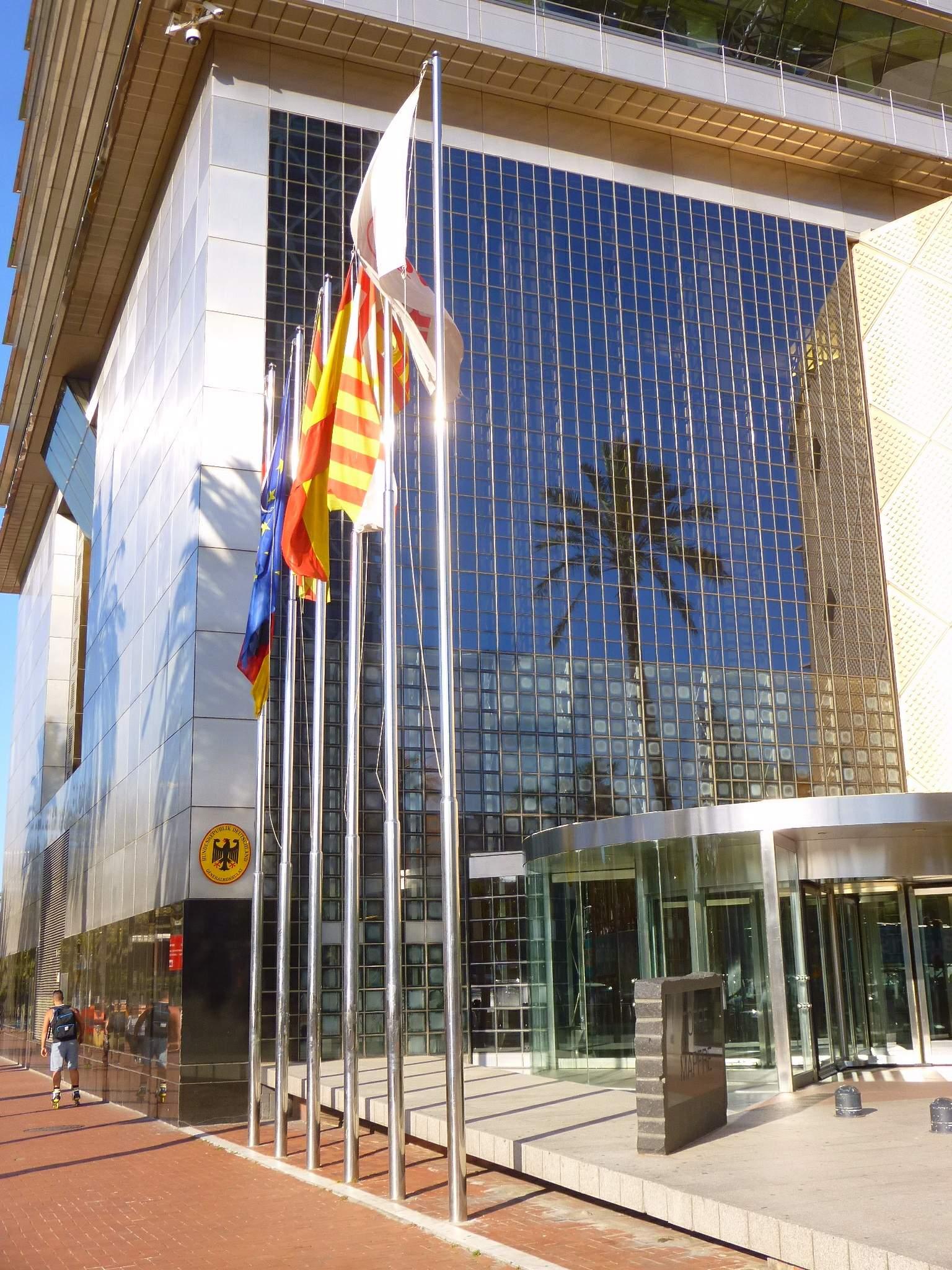
Consulate-General of Germany in Barcelona
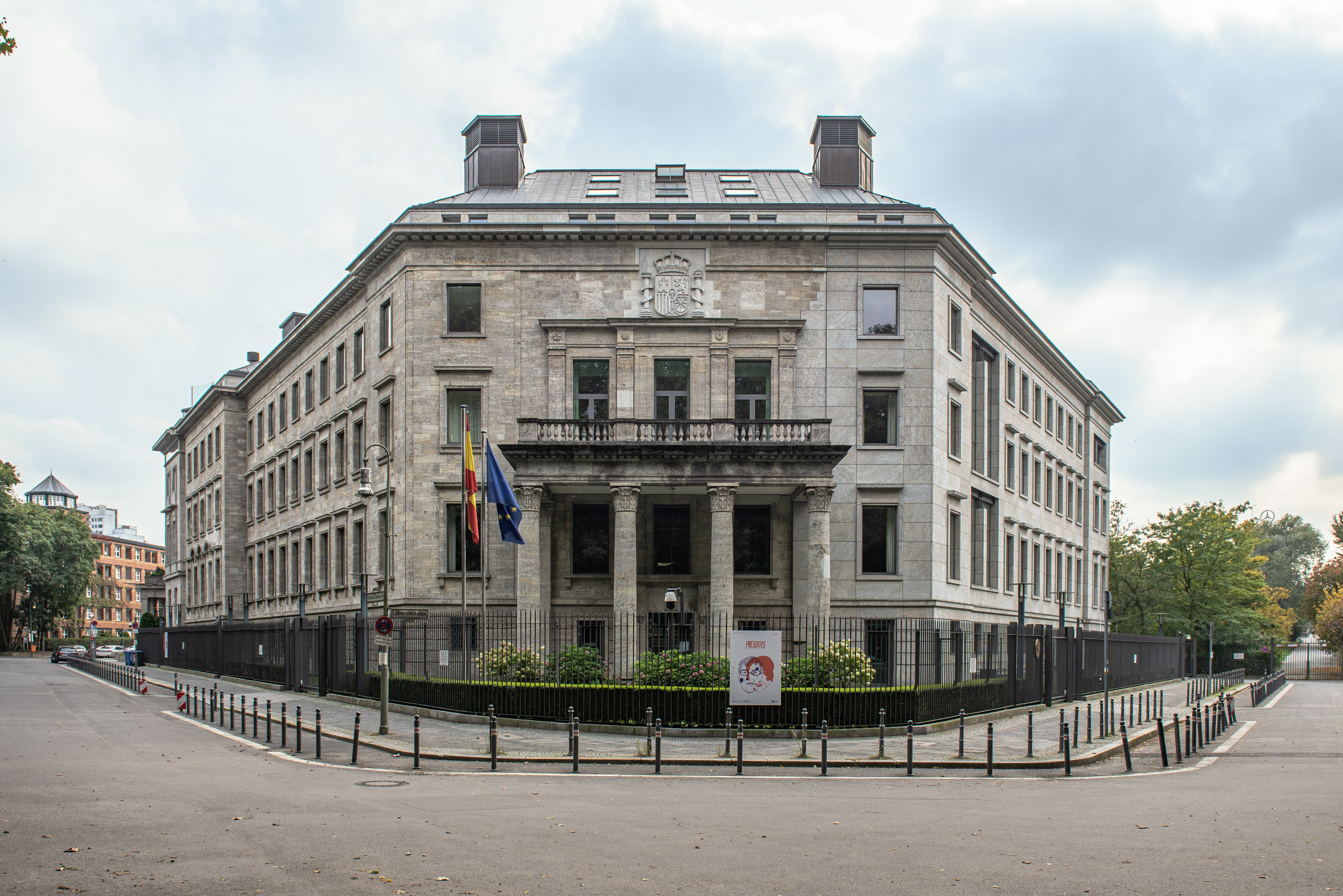
Embassy of Spain in Berlin

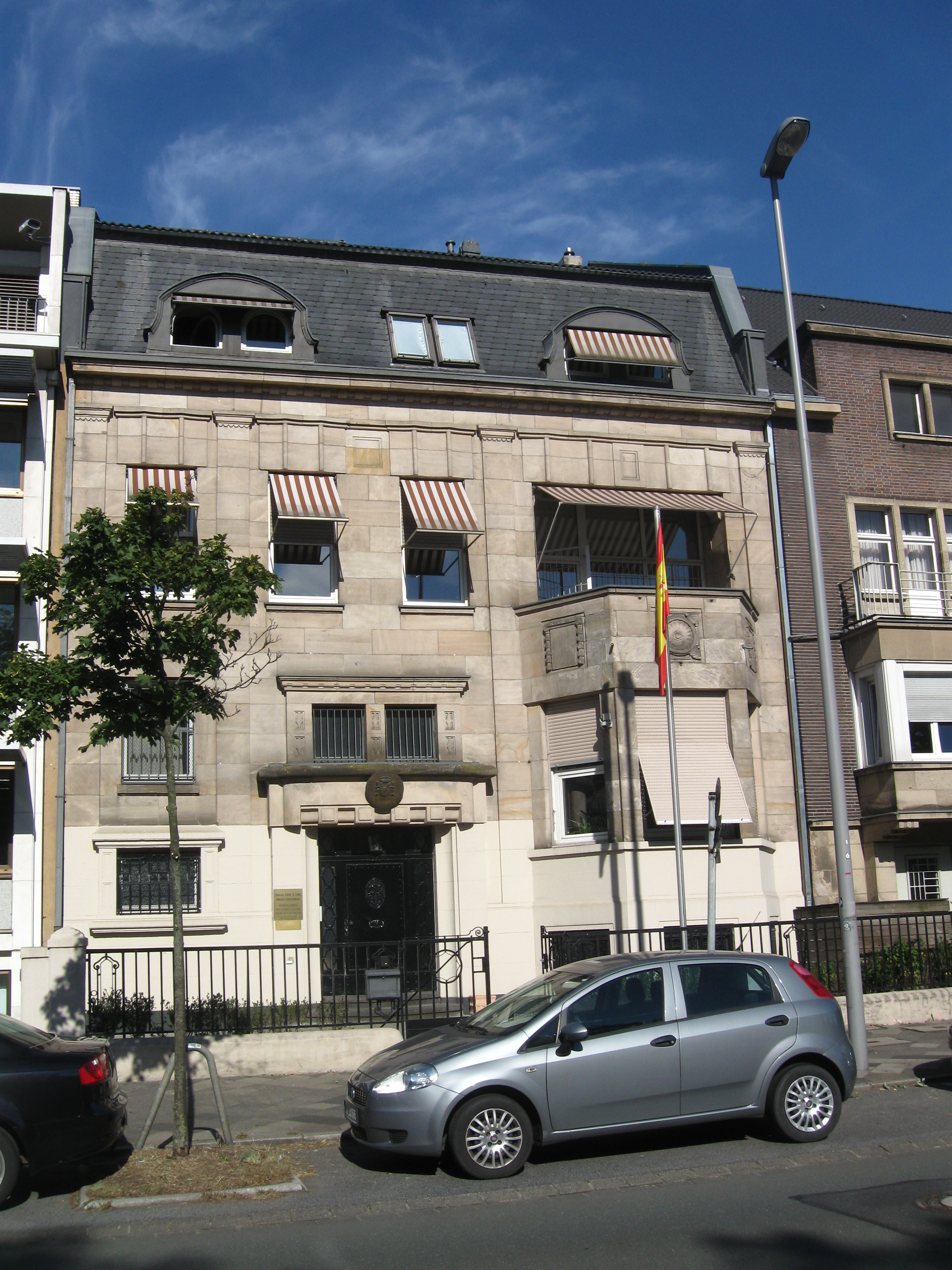
Consulate-General of Spain in Düsseldorf

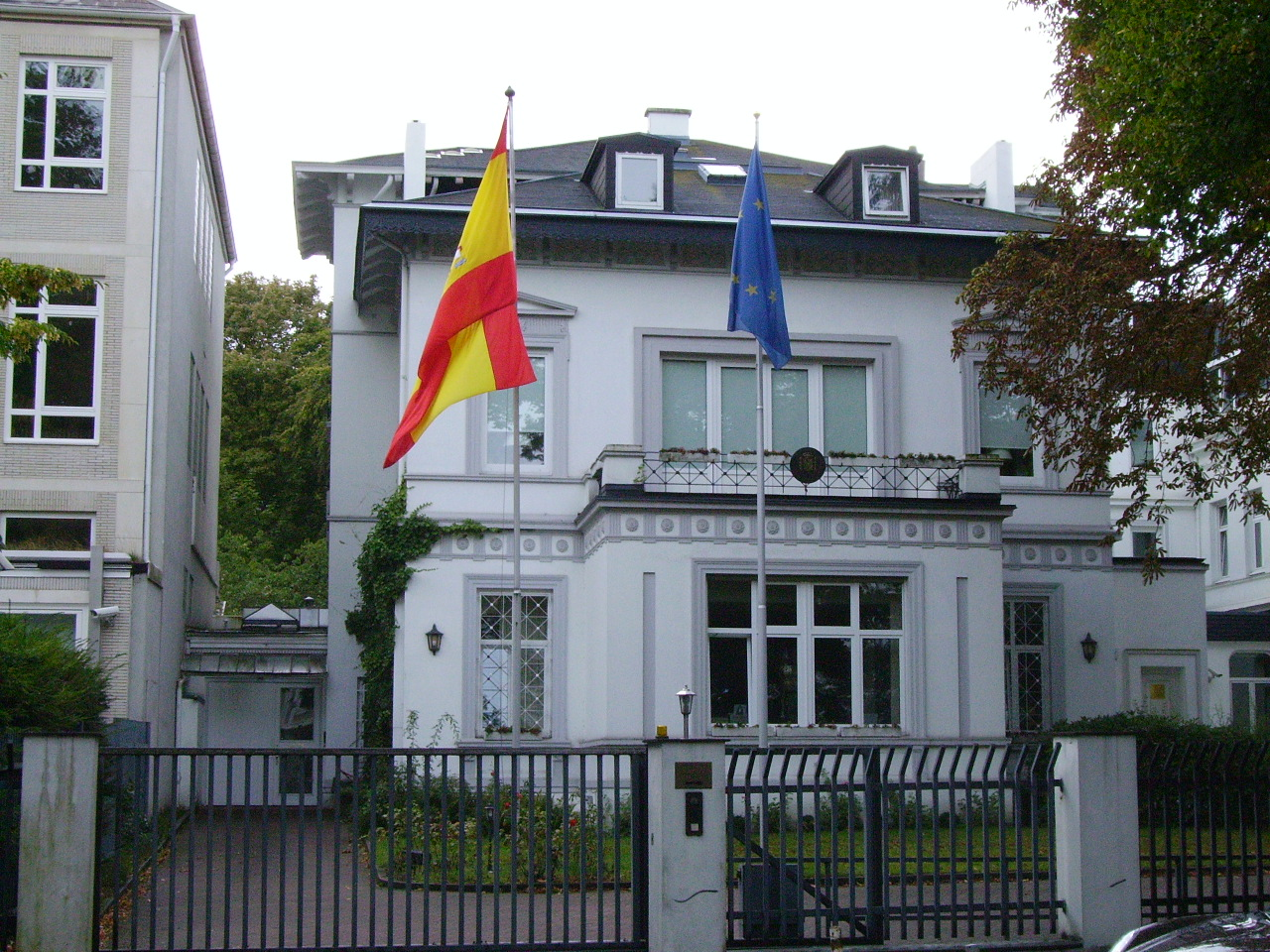
Consulate-General of Spain in Hamburg

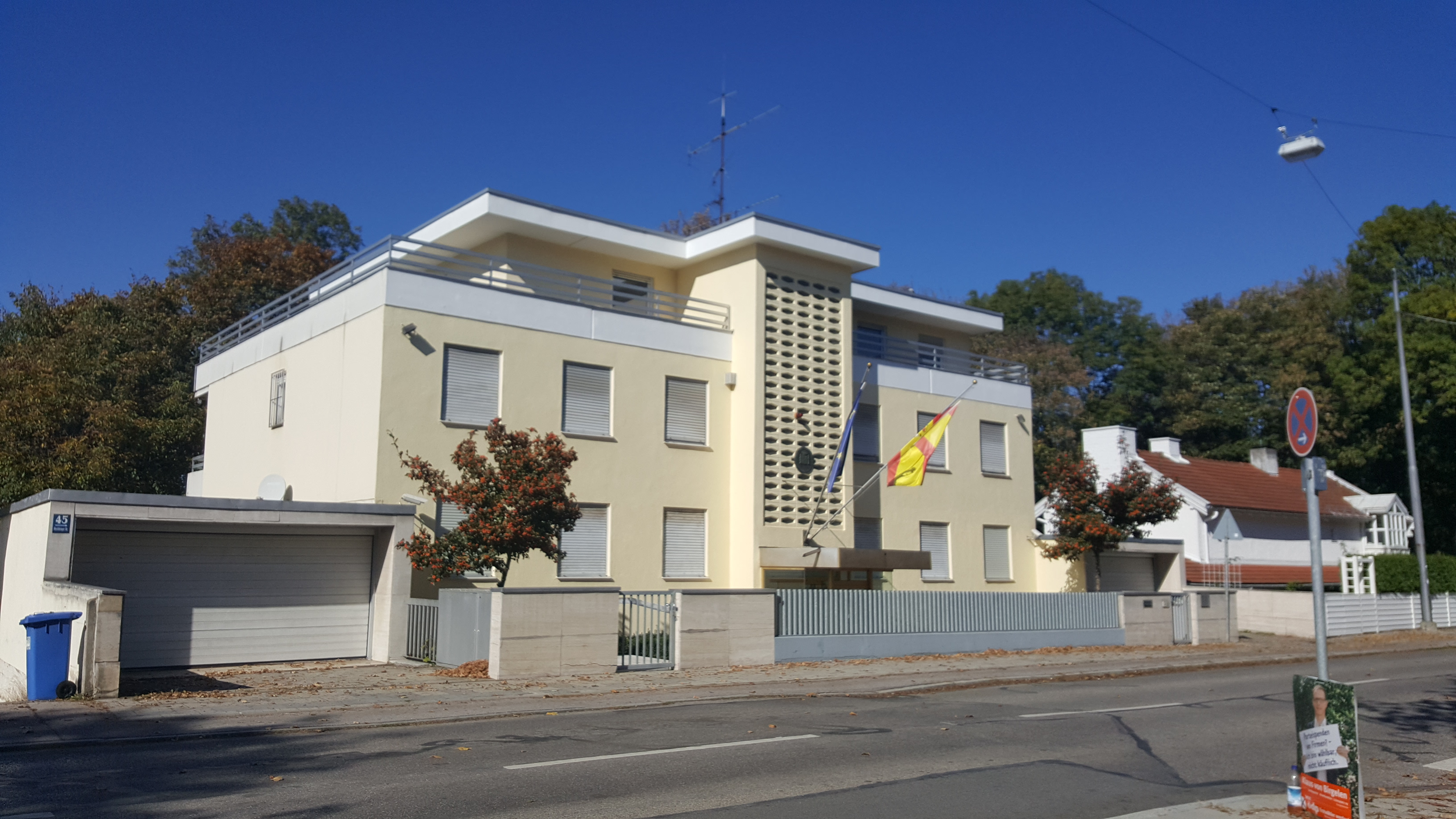
Consulate-General of Spain in Munich

== German community of Spain ==
See German Spaniards.

Related groups: Austrian Spaniards.

== See also ==
- Foreign relations of Germany
- Foreign relations of Spain
- List of ambassadors of Spain to Germany
