= Asunción Ansorena =

Spanish diplomat (1952–2008)

Ambassador of Spain to Luxembourg
- In office 2007–2008
- Preceded by: Julio Núñez Montesinos
- Succeeded by: Miguel Benzo Perea

Ambassador of Spain to Paraguay
- In office 1993–1996
- Preceded by: Eduardo Cerro Godinho
- Succeeded by: Ignacio García-Valdecasas Fernández

Personal details
- Born: María Asunción Ansorena Conto; 11 June 1952 Madrid, Spain
- Died: 15 July 2008 (aged 56) Luxembourg

Asunción Ansorena (11 June 1952 – 15 July 2008) was a Spanish diplomat.

Ansorena was the Ambassador of Spain to Paraguay from 1993 to 1996 and the Ambassador to Luxembourg from 2007 until her death.
