= José Finat y Escrivá de Romaní =

Spanish politician (1904–1995)

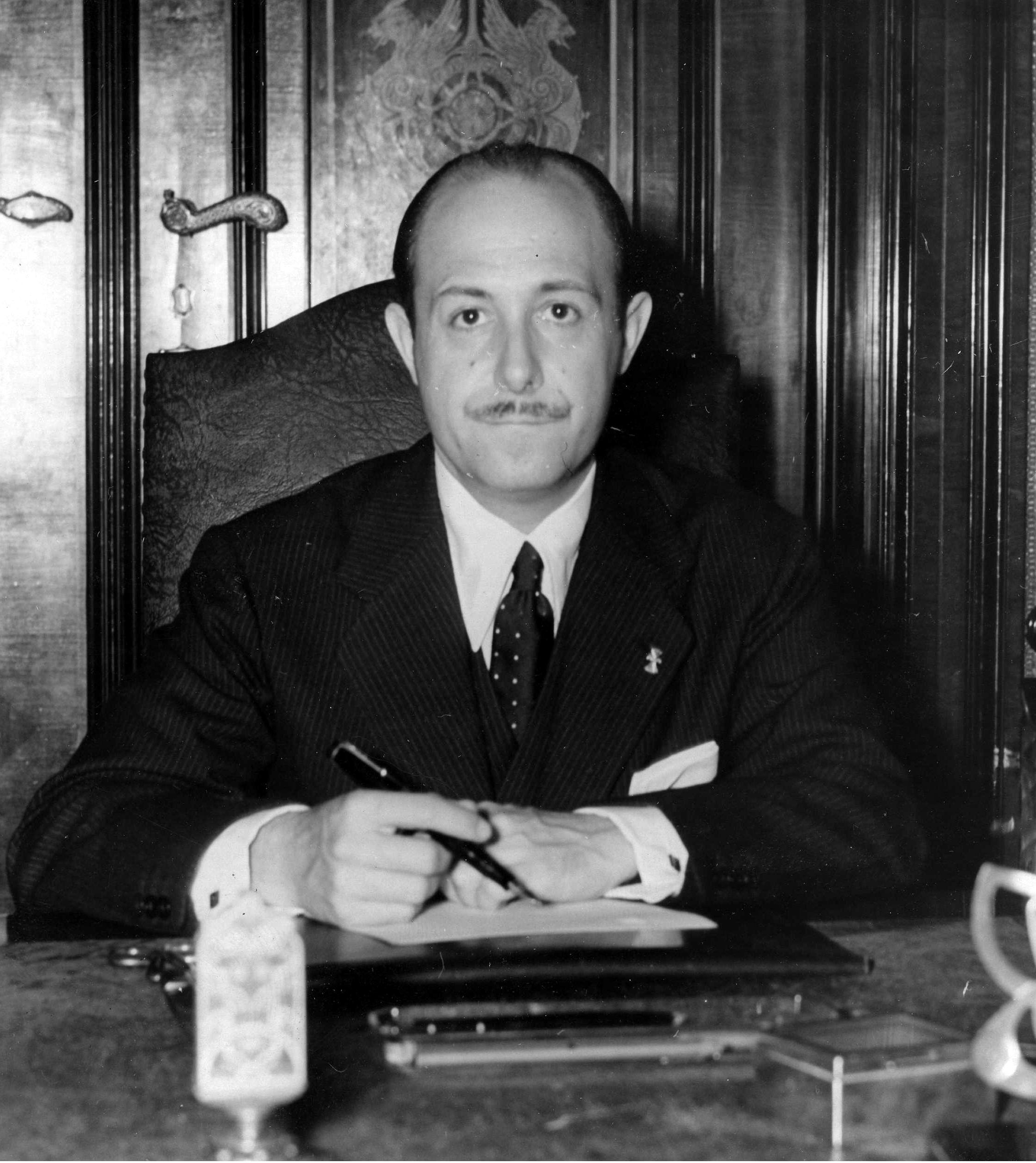
José Finat y Escrivá de Romaní as Ambassador to Germany in 1941 (National Digital Archive, Poland)

José María de la Blanca Finat y Escrivá de Romaní (Madrid, February 11, 1904 – Madrid, May 30, 1995) was a Spanish politician and government official who held several important posts in Francoist Spain. After the Civil War he was named Director General of Security and from 1952 to 1965, he was the Mayor of Madrid.

== Biography ==
=== Early years ===
His father was José Finat y Carvajal, a nobleman who held several titles including Count of Mayalde, Finat and Villaflor. His mother was Blanca Escrivá de Romaní y de la Quintana, daughter of the Count of Casal.

He entered public life in Toledo as a political protégé of the Count of Romanones in the last years of the reign of Alfonso XIII. In 1919, he assumed his father's title of Count of Mayalde. He took a degree in law and began a military career as an artillery commander.

He became an activist for the Liberal-Conservative Party in the municipal elections of 1931. After the establishment of the Second Republic his opinions became radicalized and he became a supporter of the Spanish Falange, a party that was soon incorporated into the larger national syndicalist movement. He participated in the elections of 1933 and 1936, running under the banner of the Popular Action Party and the Spanish Confederation of Autonomous Right-wing Groups (CEDA). During the Civil War, he was personal secretary to Ramón Serrano Suñer.

=== Francoist Spain ===
As DGS, he arrested and detained Lluís Companys, the President of Catalonia, who was put on trial and executed by firing squad in 1940. His final act as DGS was to establish the "Jewish Archive", a collection of documents put together by the civil authorities to register and manage the Jewish residents of Spain; approximately 6,000 at that time. Finat increased police cooperation with Nazi Germany. This cooperation involved Paul Winzer, the head of the Gestapo in Madrid, who was directing an instruction program for Franco's secret police.

Between 1941 and 1942, he served as the Spanish Ambassador to Germany, coinciding with Operation Barbarossa, which saw volunteers of the Blue Division at the front. In 1952, he was named Mayor of Madrid, a post he occupied until replaced by Carlos Arias Navarro in 1965, making him Madrid's longest-serving mayor. In 1971, he became a member of the Cortes and a Minister in Franco's National Movement. In his later years, he retired to a ranch.

=== Later life ===
A noted cattleman, the Conde de Mayalde became the President of the Union of Breeders of Fighting Bulls in 1982. The Avenida del Alcalde Conde de Mayalde in Hortaleza is named after him, as is the Public School "Conde de Mayalde" in Añover de Tajo.

== Titles held ==
- 17th Count of Mayalde
- 3rd Count of Finat
- 15th Count of Villaflor
- 14th Marquess of Terranova

== Sources ==
- Bowen, Wayne H. (2006). Spain During World War II. University of Missouri Press.

Diplomatic posts
| Preceded by Eugenio Espinosa de los Monteros | Ambassador of Spain to Germany; 1941–1942 | Succeeded by Ginés Vidal y Saura |
