= Ginés Vidal y Saura =

Spanish diplomat (1890–1945)

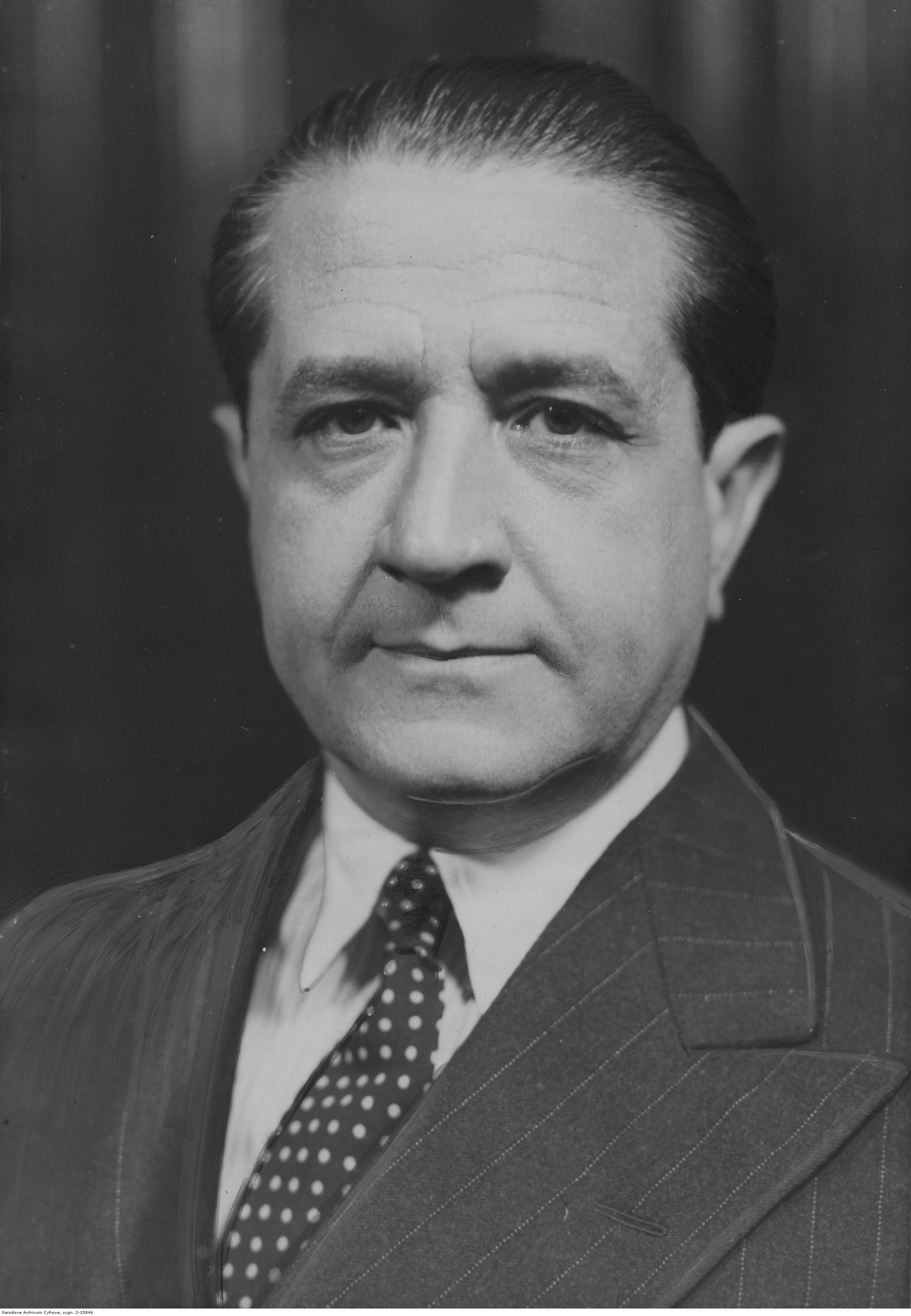
- Ginés Vidal y Saura as Ambassador to Germany in December 1942

Ambassador of Spain to Germany
- In office 1942–1945
- Leader: Francisco Franco
- Preceded by: José Finat
- Succeeded by: Antonio María Aguirre y Gonzalo (1951)

Personal details
- Born: 27 March 1890 Cartagena, Spain
- Died: 28 April 1945 (aged 55) Bern, Switzerland

Ginés Vidal y Saura (27 March 1890 – 28 April 1945) was a Spanish diplomat. During World War II he was ambassador of Spain to Germany, a position he held between 1942 and 1945.

== Biography ==
A career diplomat, Ginés Vidal held various positions in Spanish embassies in Havana, Warsaw, Berlin and Copenhagen, as well as at the High Commission of Spain in Morocco. After the outbreak of the Spanish Civil War, he joined the Nationalist faction. In 1938, he went on to serve in the Ministry of Foreign Affairs of the Nationalist zone and was appointed head of the National Service of Politics and Treaties. This position earned him a place on the Cultural Relations Board of the Ministry of Foreign Affairs. He became a close collaborator of Foreign Minister General Francisco Gómez-Jordana Sousa. In August 1940 he was part of an economic delegation that visited Berlin. At the end of 1942 he was appointed ambassador of Francoist Spain to Nazi Germany, replacing the pro-Nazi José Finat. During this period, his missions were the acquisition of German military equipment, or the withdrawal of the Blue Division from the Russian Front. Ginés Vidal left Berlin on 11 March 1945, and died of cerebral embolism shortly after, on 28 April, while he was in Bern, Switzerland.

== Awards ==
- Grand Cross of the Order of Isabella the Catholic (1942)

== Works ==
- (in Spanish) Tratado de Derecho diplomático. Editorial Reus, Madrid. 1925.
- (in Spanish) La política exterior de España durante la menor edad de Isabel II. Editorial Reus, Madrid. 1929.

Diplomatic posts
Preceded by José Finat	Ambassador of Spain to Germany; 1942–1945	Succeeded by Antonio María Aguirre y Gonzalo (1951)
