= List of ambassadors of Spain to Bulgaria =

Ambassador of Spain to Bulgaria
- Coat of arms of Spain
- Incumbent; Miguel Alonso Berrio since 28 February 2024
- Ministry of Foreign Affairs; Secretariat of State for the European Union
- Style: The Most Excellent
- Residence: Sofia
- Nominator: The Foreign Minister
- Appointer: The Monarch
- Term length: At the government's pleasure
- Inaugural holder: José María Trías de Bes y Borrás
- Formation: 1977
- Website: Mission of Spain to Bulgaria

The ambassador of Spain to Bulgaria is the official representative of the Kingdom of Spain to the Republic of Bulgaria.

Spain and the Principality of Bulgaria established trade relations in December 1899 and Spain recognized Bulgaria's independence from the Ottoman Empire on 8 May 1910, establishing diplomatic relations. Relations were severed following the 1946 Bulgarian republic referendum that abolished the monarchy and the creation of a socialist state. Three decades later, in 1977, during the Spanish transition to democracy, both countries re-established relations with the rank of embassy.

== List of ambassadors ==
This list was compiled using the work "History of the Spanish Diplomacy" by the Spanish historian and diplomat Miguel Ángel Ochoa Brun. The work covers up to the year 2000, so the rest is based on appointments published in the Boletín Oficial del Estado or news media.

| Name | Rank | Term |
|---|---|---|
| Manuel Multedo y Cortina | Minister | 1910–1913 |
| Diego Saavedra y Magdalena | Acting Minister | 1915–1917 |
| Diego Saavedra y Magdalena | Minister | 1917–1919 |
| José Romero y Dusmet | Minister | 1919–1928 |
| Fernando de Antón del Olmet, Marquess of Dosfuentes | Minister | 1929–1930 |
| Juan Bautista Arregui del Campo | Minister | 1930–1932 |
| Francisco Ramírez Montesinos | Chargé d'affaires | 1933 |
| Manuel Llopis de Casades | Chargé d'affaires a.i. | 1934–1935 |
| Emilio Sanz y Tovar, Count of Lizárraga | Chargé d'affaires a.i. | 1935 |
| Lois Tobío Fernández (Note: Representing the Republican Government during the Spanish Civil War.) | Chargé d'affaires a.i. | 1936 |
| Carlos de Miranda y Quartín, Count of Casa Miranda (Note: Representing the Rebel Government during the Spanish Civil War.) | Chargé d'affaires | 1935–1940 |
| Julio Palencia Tubau | Minister | 1940–1943 |
| Ramón María de Pujadas y Gastón | Minister | 1943–1945 |
| Ángel Díaz de Tuesta | Minister | 1946 |
| Luis Arroyo Aznar | Head of Mission-Consular and Trade Representative | 1970–1977 |
| José María Trías de Bes y Borrás | Ambassador | 1977–1980 |
| José Luis de la Peña Aznar | Ambassador | 1980–1983 |
| José Cuenca Anaya | Ambassador | 1983–1987 |
| Joaquín Pérez Gómez | Ambassador | 1987–1993 |
| Jorge Fuentes Monzonís-Villalonga | Ambassador | 1993–1997 |
| José Coderch | Ambassador | 1997–2001 |
| José Ángel López Jorrin | Ambassador | 2001–2004 |
| Fernando Arias | Ambassador | 2004–2009 |
| Jorge Fuentes Monzonís-Villalonga | Ambassador | 2009–2010 |
| Rafael Mendívil Peydro | Ambassador | 2010–2012 |
| José Luis Tapia Vicente | Ambassador | 2012–2017 |
| Francisco Javier Pérez-Griffo y de Vides | Ambassador | 2017–2019 |
| Alejandro Polanco Mata | Ambassador | 2019–2024 |
| Miguel Alonso Berrio | Ambassador | 2024–pres. |

== See also ==
- Bulgaria–Spain relations
