= María Victoria Morera =

Spanish diplomat (1956–2020)

Under-Secretary of Foreign Affairs
- In office 30 May 2003 – 19 April 2004
- Preceded by: José Pedro Sebastián de Erice
- Succeeded by: Luis Calvo Merino

Ambassador of Spain to Belgium
- In office 18 September 2004 – 30 October 2007
- Preceded by: Francisco Fernández Fábregas
- Succeeded by: Carlos Gómez-Múgica

Ambassador of Spain to Germany
- In office 26 January 2017 – 31 October 2018
- Preceded by: Juan Pablo García-Berdoy
- Succeeded by: Ricardo Martínez Vázquez

Personal details
- Born: María Victoria Morera Villuendas; 25 May 1956 Madrid, Spain
- Died: 5 August 2020 (aged 64) Madrid, Spain
- Spouse: Antonio
- Children: Iñigo; Mavi
- Profession: Diplomat
- Awards: Order of Isabella the Catholic (2004)

María Victoria Morera Villuendas, also known as Matoya Morera to diplomatic colleagues, (25 May 1956 – 5 August 2020) was a Spanish career diplomat. In 2003, Morera was appointed Under-Secretary of Foreign Affairs, becoming the first woman to hold that position. She also served as Ambassador of Spain to Belgium from 2004 to 2007 and the first female Ambassador of Spain to Germany from 2017 to 2018.

== Biography ==
Morera was born in Madrid in 1956. She entered Spain's Diplomatic Service in 1982 and held a variety of diplomatic postings over the course of the next two decades.

The then-Minister of Foreign Affairs Ana Palacio appointed Morera as Director of her the ministry's Cabinet in July 2002. In May 2003, Morera was appointed Under-Secretary of the Ministry of Foreign Affairs, becoming the first woman to hold that particular position. She remained in that post until April 2004, when she was replaced by the new incoming Foreign Minister, Miguel Ángel Moratinos.

Shortly after leaving her role as under-secretary, María Victoria Morera was appointed Ambassador to Belgium. She served as the Spanish ambassador in Brussels from 2004 until 2007. In 2008, she became director of the Consular Emergency Unit, which helps Spanish citizens in trouble abroad. She held this role for several years.

From 2012 until January 2017, Morera was appointed the Director General of Bilateral Relations with Countries of the European Union, Candidate Countries and Countries of the European Economic Area within the foreign ministry.

In January 2017, Morera was appointed Ambassador of Spain to Germany, which is considered one of Spain's most important ambassadorships. Morera was also the first woman to serve as Ambassador to Germany. She served in the posting until October 2018, when the new government of Prime Minister Pedro Sánchez appointed Ricardo Martínez Vázquez as her replacement in a diplomatic reshuffle.

Morera was diagnosed with cancer while still serving as Ambassador to Germany. She continued to work in the Foreign Ministry's General Services Inspectorate upon her return to Spain.

María Victoria Morera died from cancer in Madrid on 5 August 2020, at the age of 64.
