= Beatriz Larrotcha Palma =

Spanish diplomat (1959–2024)

Ambassador of Spain to Belgium
- In office 14 September 2018 – 27 September 2022
- Preceded by: Cecilia Yuste Rojas
- Succeeded by: Alberto Antón Cortés

Under-Secretary of Foreign Affairs
- In office 21 July 2017 – 13 July 2018
- Preceded by: Cristóbal González-Aller Jurado
- Succeeded by: Ángeles Moreno Bau

Personal details
- Born: 4 September 1959 Jaén, Spain
- Died: 3 December 2024 (aged 65) Madrid, Spain
- Profession: Diplomat
- Awards: Grand Cross of the Order of Civil Merit (2018)

Beatriz Larrotcha Palma (4 September 1959 – 3 December 2024) was a Spanish diplomat. She served as Undersecretary of the Ministry of Foreign Affairs from 2017 to 2018 and as Ambassador of Spain to Belgium from 2018 to 2022.

== Life and career ==
After graduating in law, Larrotcha entered the diplomatic service in 1987.

Larrotcha has been assigned to the diplomatic representations of Algeria, Belgium and Peru as well as to the permanent representative of Spain to the European Union. She was delegate of the Ministry of Foreign Affairs to the Barcelona 92 Olympic Organizing Committee, deputy assistant director general of Personnel, deputy director general of Patrimonial Affairs and advisor to the General Inspection of Services, the Diplomatic Information Office and the General Directorate of Spaniards Abroad and Consular and Migration Affairs.

In 2012, Larrotcha was appointed director of the Office of the Secretary of State for Foreign Affairs. She was technical general secretary (2016–2017) and undersecretary at the Ministry of Foreign Affairs (2017–2018).

In October 2018, Larrotcha was summoned to testify for an alleged crime of prevarication, in relation to a complaint that the diplomat Miguel Ángel Vecino had filed in court against three undersecretaries of the Ministry—Beatriz Larrotcha, Cristóbal González-Aller and Rafael Mendívil— on the grounds that she was being unfairly denied positions abroad.

Larrotcha's last posting was as Spanish ambassador to Belgium, a position she held between 2018 and 2022. She died in Madrid on 3 December 2024, at the age of 65.
