= Gurtler =

Gurtler or Gürtler is a German surname. Notable people with the surname include:

- Alfred Gürtler (1875–1933), Austrian statistician, economist and politician, Finance Minister
- Elisabeth Gürtler (born 1950), Austrian businesswoman
- Jan Gürtler (born 1970), German para table tennis player
- John Gurtler, American sportscaster
- Matt Gurtler, American politician
- Robert Gurtler (1936–2022), American magician known under his stage name André Kole
- William Minot Guertler (1880–1959), German metallurgist

== See also ==
- 73692 Gürtler, a main-belt asteroid named after Joachim Gürtler (born 1939)
