= List of ambassadors of Spain to Luxembourg =

Ambassador of Spain to Luxembourg
- Coat of arms of Spain

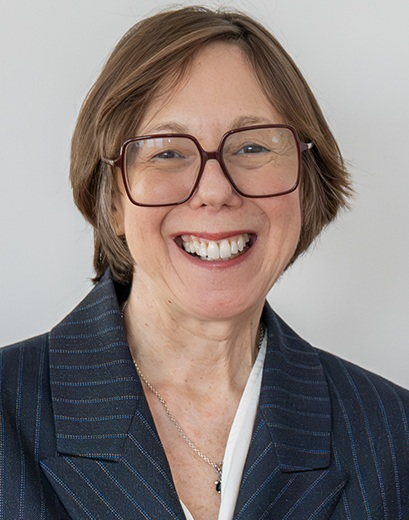
- Incumbent; María Nieves Blanco Díaz since 2 July 2025
- Ministry of Foreign Affairs; Secretariat of State for the European Union
- Style: The Most Excellent
- Residence: Luxembourg City
- Nominator: The Foreign Minister
- Appointer: The Monarch
- Term length: At the government's pleasure
- Inaugural holder: Carlos de Miranda y Quartín, 4th Count of Casa Miranda
- Formation: 1955
- Website: Mission of Spain to Luxembourg

The ambassador of Spain to Luxembourg is the official representative of the Kingdom of Spain to the Grand Duchy of Luxembourg.

Following the separation of the Dutch and Luxemburg crowns in 1890, Spain recognized the Grand Duchy's new sovereign and accredited its Minister to the Netherlands as Minister to Luxembourg on 9 February 1891, this being the starting point of diplomatic relations between both nations. This situation persisted until 1922, when Minister Fernández Prida transferred Luxembourg's diplomatic affairs to the Embassy in Brussels and the consular protection to the Consulate of Spain in the Belgian capital.

Since the term of The Count of Casa Miranda, (Note: In the Diplomatic Career Roster of January 1, 1955 (BOE no. 261, published on September 18, 1955), he appears with the category of minister in Luxembourg, however, in the roster of January 1, 1956 (BOE no. 83, published on March 23, 1956) and onwards, he appears with the category of ambassador.) the diplomatic representation to the Grand Duke has had the rank of Embassy and, since 1970, the ambassador has been resident in Luxembourg City.

== List of ambassadors ==
This list was compiled using the work "History of the Spanish Diplomacy" by the Spanish historian and diplomat Miguel Ángel Ochoa Brun. The work covers up to the year 2000, so the rest is based on appointments published in the Boletín Oficial del Estado or news media.

| Name | Rank | Term |
|---|---|---|
| The Minister to the Netherlands | | 1891–1922 |
| The Ambassador to Belgium | | 1922–1970 |
| Ramón Sedó Gómez | Ambassador | 1970–1972 |
| José Aragonés Vila | Ambassador | 1972–1974 |
| Fernando Sebastián de Erice y O'Shea | Ambassador | 1974–1976 |
| José Luis Los Arcos Elío | Ambassador | 1976–1981 |
| Juan Antonio Pérez-Urrutia Maura | Ambassador | 1981–1985 |
| Eduardo de Zulueta y Dato | Ambassador | 1985–1988 |
| Luis Javier Casanova Fernández | Ambassador | 1988–1992 |
| Alonso Álvarez de Toledo y Merry del Val | Ambassador | 1992–1996 |
| Ramiro Pérez-Maura, Duke of Maura | Ambassador | 1996–2000 |
| Ricardo Zalacaín Jorge | Ambassador | 2000–2004 |
| Julio Núñez Montesinos | Ambassador | 2004–2007 |
| Asunción Ansorena | Ambassador | 2007–2008 |
| Miguel Benzo Perea | Ambassador | 2008–2011 |
| Arturo Avello Díez del Corral | Ambassador | 2011–2014 |
| Carlos María de Lojendio y Pardo Manuel de Villena | Ambassador | 2014–2018 |
| Bernardo de Sicart Escoda | Ambassador | 2018–2022 |
| José María Rodríguez Coso | Ambassador | 2022–2025 |
| María Nieves Blanco Díaz | Ambassador | 2025–pres. |

== See also ==
- Luxembourg–Spain relations
