= List of ambassadors of Spain to Germany =

Ambassador of Spain to Germany
- Coat of Arms of Spain

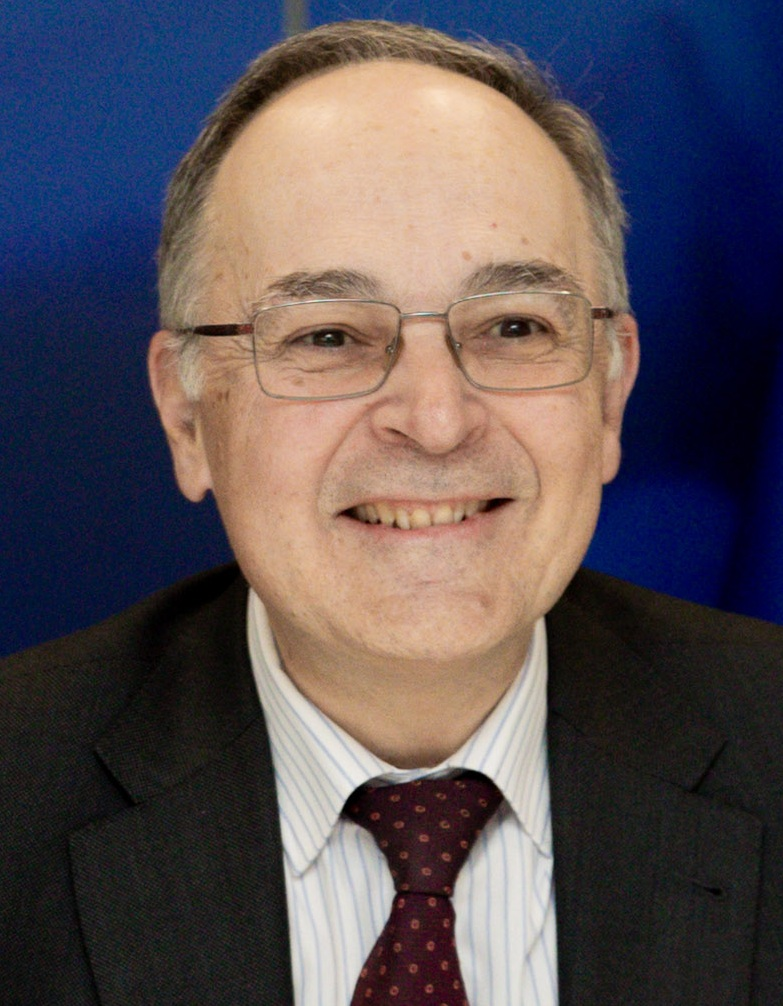
- Incumbent; Pascual Navarro Ríos since 14 February 2024
- Ministry of Foreign Affairs
- Style: His Excellency
- Nominator: Minister of Foreign Affairs
- Appointer: The Monarch
- Deputy: Deputy Chief of Mission at the Embassy of Spain to Germany

The ambassador of Spain to Germany is Spain's foremost diplomatic representative in Germany, and is in charge of Spain's diplomatic mission to Germany.

== History ==
The ambassador is appointed to the Council of Ministers, they direct the work of all the offices that depend on the embassy, based in Berlin. Likewise, it informs the Spanish Government about the evolution of events in Germany, negotiates on behalf of Spain, can sign or ratify agreements, observes the development of bilateral relations in all fields and ensures the protection of Spanish interests and its citizens in Germany.

== Heads of Mission ==
=== Ambassadors to the German Confederation ===
From	Up To	Ambassador	Notes
1856	1857	Francisco Estrada	
1857	1859	Cayo Marqués de San Carlos Quiñones de León	
1859	1862	Manuel Rancés y Villanueva	
1862	1864	Juan Antonio Rascón Navarro Seña y Redondo	
1864	1866	Tomás de Ligués y Bardají	
1865	1866	Juan Valera y Alcalá	
1866	1866	Jesús Muñoz y Sánchez	

=== Ambassadors to Germany ===
From	Up To	Ambassador	Notes
1869	1872	Juan Antonio Rascón Navarro Seña y Redondo	
1872	1874	Patricio de la Escosura	
1875	1888	Francisco Merry y Colom	
1888	1890	Juan Antonio Rascón Navarro Seña y Redondo	
1892	1893	Miguel de los Santos de Bañuelos y Travel	
1893	1900	Felipe Méndez de Vigo	
1900	1906	Ángel de Ruata y Sichar	
1906	1920	Luis Polo de Bernabé	
1920	1927	Pablo Soler y Guardiola	
1927	1931	Fernando Espinosa de los Monteros	
1931	1932	Américo Castro Quesada	
1932	1933	Luis Araquistáin y Quevedo	
1933	1934	Luis de Zulueta y Escolano	
1935	1936	Francisco Agramonte y Cortijo	
1937	1940	Antonio Magaz y Pers	First ambassador of the Francoist Spain.
1940	1941	Eugenio Espinosa de los Monteros y Bermejillo	
1941	1942	José Finat y Escrivá de Romaní	
1942	1945	Ginés Vidal y Saura	
1945	1951	Vacant	

=== Ambassadors to the Federal Republic of Germany ===
From	Up To	Ambassador	Notes
1951	1959	Antonio María Aguirre y Gonzalo	
1959	1964	Luis de Urquijo y Landecho	
1964	1971	José Sebastián de Erice y O'Shea	
1971	1974	Francisco Javier Conde García	
1975	1981	Emilio Garrido y Díaz-Cabañete	
1982	1983	Juan Durán-Loriga Rodrigáñez	
1983	1991	Eduardo Foncillas Casaus	
1991	1996	Fernando Perpiñá-Robert Peyra	
1996	2002	José Pedro Sebastián de Erice y Gómez-Acebo	
2002	2004	José Rodríguez-Spiteri Palazuelo	
2004	2008	Gabriel Busquets Aparicio	
2008	2012	Rafael Dezcallar de Mazarredo	
2012	2016	Juan Pablo García-Berdoy y Cerezo	
2017	2018	María Victoria Morera Villuendas	
2018	2024	Ricardo Martínez Vázquez	
2024	Incumbent	Pascual Navarro Ríos	

== See also ==
- Germany–Spain relations
- Foreign relations of Spain
- List of ambassadors of Germany to Spain
