= Miguel Benzo Perea =

Spanish diplomat (born 1951)

Ambassador of Spain to Luxembourg
- In office 2009–2011

Ambassador of Spain to Lebanon
- In office 2006–2009

Special Ambassador to Iraq
- In office 2003–2003

Personal details
- Born: 7 December 1951 (age 74)
- Education: Complutense University of Madrid

Miguel Benzo Perea (born 7 November 1951) is a Spanish journalist and diplomat. He served as the ambassador of Spain to various countries, including Lebanon and Luxembourg. He was also special ambassador to Iraq in 2003.

== Early life and education ==
Benzo was born on 7 November 1951. He obtained degrees in law and journalism from the Complutense University of Madrid.

== Career and activities ==
Following his graduation Benzo joined the Ministry of Foreign Affairs in March 1977. He served in various posts at the Ministry and was named as the special ambassador to Iraq in 2003. He was the ambassador in the special mission between 2004 and 2006. He was appointed ambassador of Spain to Lebanon in 2006. Then he served as the ambassador of Spain to Luxembourg. He is the consul general of Spain in Guadalajara, Mexico.

Benzo is the author of the book entitled Embajador En Mision Especial En Irak in which he discussed the events in the post-war Iraq.
