= Antonio Magaz =

Spanish naval officer, politician and diplomat (1864–1953)

Admiral Antonio Magaz 2nd Marquess of Magaz
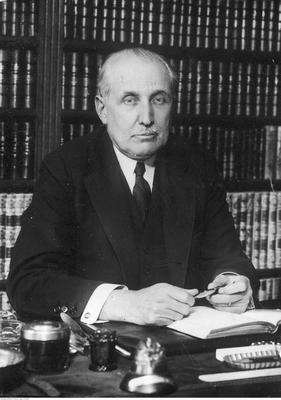
- Antonio Magaz in 1926
- Born: Antonio Magaz y Pers; 21 June 1864; Barcelona, Kingdom of Spain
- Died: 13 October 1953 (aged 89); Madrid, Spanish State
- Spouse: María de los Ángeles Fernández de Henestrosa y Fuentes-Bustillo
- Children: 5 (Juan, Jaime, Carlos, Antonio and Andrés)
- Military career
- Branch: Spanish Navy
- Service years: 1878–?
- Rank: Admiral
- Conflicts: Spanish-American War
- Awards: Grand Cross (with Red Decoration) of Military Merit; Grand Cross (with Red Decoration) of Naval Merit; Grand Cross of the Royal and Military Order of Saint Hermenegild; Grand Cross of the Order of Charles III; Cross of the Order of St. Gregory the Great; Grand Officer of the Order of Saints Maurice and Lazarus; Officer Cross of the Legion of Honour
- Other work: Vice President of the Military Directory (1923–1925); Interim President of the Military Directory (1924–1925); Spanish ambassador to the Holy See (1926–1930 and 1936); Spanish ambassador to Germany (1937–1940); Spanish ambassador to Argentina (1940–1943)

Antonio Magaz y Pers, 2nd Marquess of Magaz (21 June 1864 – 13 October 1953) was a Spanish naval officer, politician and diplomat. He served as vice president of the second Military Directory during the dictatorship of General Miguel Primo de Rivera (1923–1925) and a gentilhombre de cámara con ejercicio to King Alfonso XIII. He is mentioned in various sources as Marquess of Magaz or Admiral Magaz.

He married María de los Ángeles Fernández de Henestrosa y Fuentes-Bustillo (Madrid, 1863 – Madrid, 1934), and was the father of Juan, Jaime, Carlos, Antonio and Andrés Magaz y Fernández de Henestrosa. His grandson, Antonio Magaz y Sangro (Madrid, January 1926 – Santander, 12 June 1984) (son of Juan, who was shot on 7 November 1936 in Cárcel Modelo in Madrid) succeeded him as 3rd Marquess of Magaz.

== Biography ==
He was the son of Juan Magaz y Jaime (Calatayud, 1823 – Madrid, 1901), 1st Marquess of Magaz, and Leonor Pers y Girandón. In 1878 he entered the Fleet Naval School aboard the frigate Asturias. In 1880 he was promoted to midshipman and, in 1884, to lieutenant. In his first years of service he sailed on the corvettes Ferrolana, Tornado and María de Molina, and on the frigates Blanca, Carmen, Zaragoza, Gerona and Lealtad.

In 1892, as a lieutenant, he participated in the recreation of the first voyage of Christopher Columbus, carried out by a replica of the carrack Santa María, on the 400th anniversary of the voyage.

In 1898 he participated in the Spanish-American War aboard the armored cruiser Vizcaya, entering into combat with the United States Navy on 3 July of that year at the Battle of Santiago de Cuba, a battle in which the Spanish Navy fleet was destroyed. He later took command of the gunboats Mac Mahón (1900) and Temerario (1909). In 1915 he went on to command the training corvette Nautilus and, the following year, he briefly directed the Naval Military Academy. He was later a prosecutor at the Supreme Council of War and Navy, and later went on to command the battleship España.

In 1920 he was promoted to rear admiral and appointed Spanish Naval Delegate to the Permanent Commission of the League of Nations. In 1922 he went on to head the newly created Naval Aeronautics.

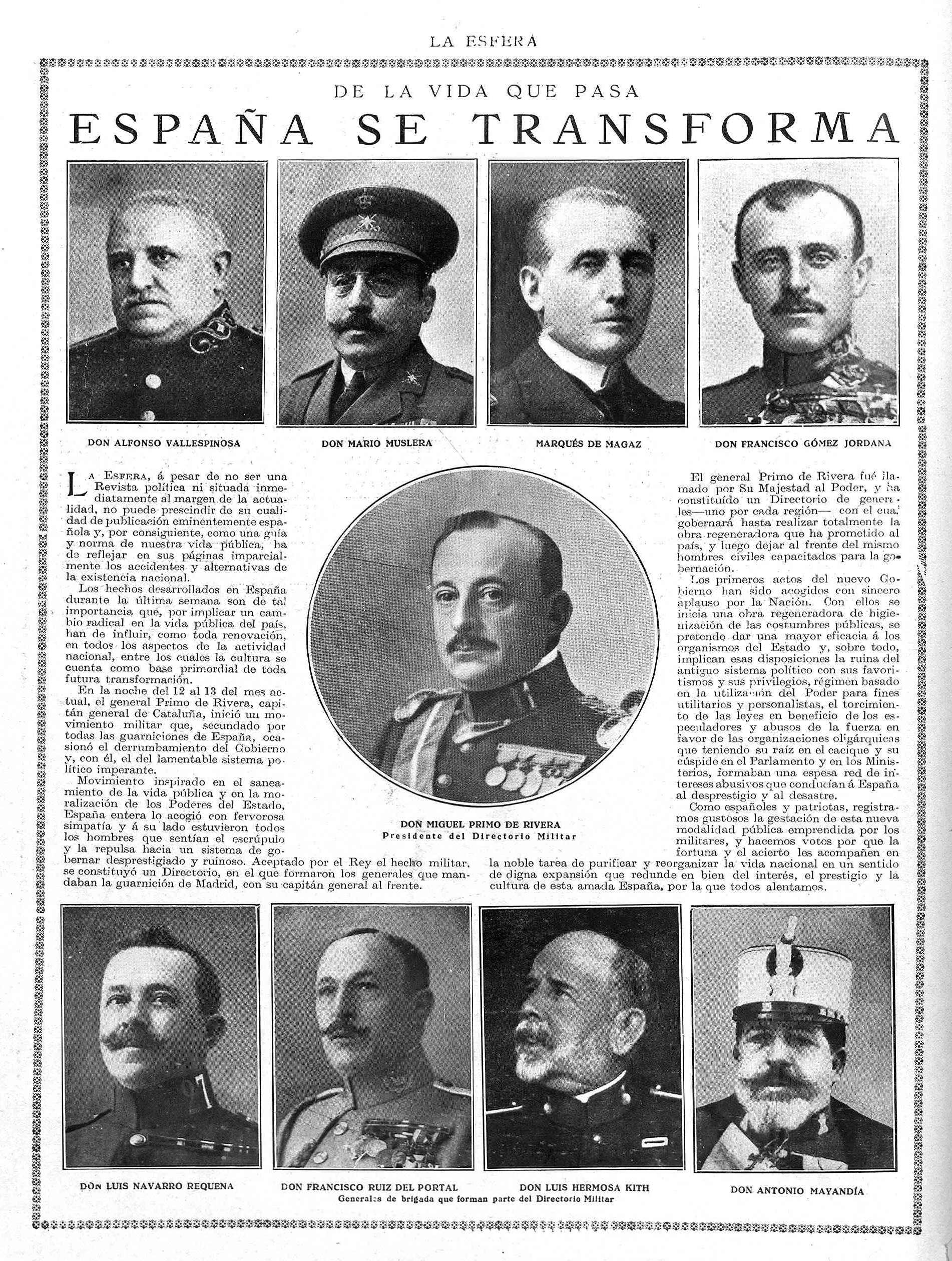
"From the passing life—Spain is transformed." Page from the magazine La Esfera (22 September 1923) with portraits of members of the Military Directorate. Magaz is second from right in the upper row.

With the advent of the dictatorship of General Miguel Primo de Rivera he became part of the Military Directory, of which he was vice president (1923–1925) and interim president during the dictator's stay in Africa (1924–1925) during the Rif War.

In 1930 he was appointed admiral and captain general of the Maritime Department of Cartagena. From that position, on 14 April of the following year, he was in charge of seeing off King Alfonso XIII to his exile, after the elections that would give way to the Second Spanish Republic.

He was ambassador to the Holy See on two occasions (1926–1930 and 1936). He was later ambassador to Berlin (1937–1940) and Buenos Aires (1940–1943).

== Holy See ==
In 1936, he was commissioned by the National Defense Junta of Burgos to obtain the assent as ambassador to the Holy See; this was denied since the Holy See only recognized the representative of the Republican government, Luis de Zulueta, as ambassador. Finally, on 30 September, in the absence of the ambassador, Magaz took control of the seat and the following day raised the monarchical flag. The Holy See never officially recognized him, although finally, when Magaz was assigned to Berlin, it ended up recognizing his successor, Pedro de Churruca y Dotes.

== Berlin ==
During his stay in Berlin he carried out the relocation of the embassy from the former Thiele-Winkler Palace to its current headquarters in the diplomatic quarter. Likewise, on 4 July 1939, he presented Adolf Hitler, at the Reich Chancellery, three paintings by Ignacio Zuloaga, offered on behalf of Francisco Franco.

He developed an interesting activity in the acquisition of decorative objects and works of art for the future embassy, coinciding with a turbulent time in the art market due to the decision of the German government to consider most of the works of art of the avant-garde movements as degenerate art (German: Entartete Kunst), with the consequent depreciation of their value.

The Marquessate's connection with the artistic avant-garde continued with his successor, Antonio Magaz y Sangro, author of a study on the painting of Fernando Zóbel.
