= List of ambassadors of Spain to Belgium =

Spanish Ambassadors to Belgium

Ambassador of Spain to Belgium

- Coat of Arms of Spain
- Incumbent; Alberto Antón Cortés since 27 September 2022
- Ministry of Foreign Affairs
- Style: His Excellency
- Nominator: Minister of Foreign Affairs
- Appointer: The Monarch
- Deputy: Deputy Chief of Mission at the Embassy of Spain to Belgium

The Ambassador of Spain to Belgium is the Kingdom of Spain's foremost diplomatic representative in Belgium.

== History ==
From 1599 to 1603, Baltasar de Zúñiga was ambassador of Philip III of Spain to the court of Isabella Clara Eugenia and Albert VII, Archduke of Austria at the Palace of Coudenberg (today Brussels Park). Until the referendum on Spain's membership in NATO, the ambassador in Brussels represented the Spanish Government before the North Atlantic Council and President of the Spanish mission before the European Atomic Energy Community. On 28 October 1965, José Núñez Iglesias was replaced by Alberto Ullastres Calvo as President of the Spanish mission to the European Common Market.

The ambassador is appointed to the Council of Ministers, they direct the work of all the offices that depend on the embassy, based in Brussels. Likewise, it informs the Spanish Government about the evolution of events in Belgium, negotiates on behalf of Spain, can sign or ratify agreements, observes the development of bilateral relations in all fields and ensures the protection of Spanish interests and its citizens in Belgium.

The current ambassador is Alberto Antón Cortés, who was appointed by Pedro Sánchez's government on 27 September 2022.

== List of ambassadors ==
| Mission Start | Mission End | Name | Notes |
|---|---|---|---|
| 1844 | 1847 | Salvador Cea Bermúdez | Count of Colombi |
| 1847 | 1849 | Diego Desmaissières y López Dicastillo | Conde de la Vega del Pozo |
| 1849 | 1851 | José Neviet | |
| 1851 | 1853 | Antonio Luis Arnau | |
| 1853 | 1862 | Eduardo Sancho Subercasi | |
| 1863 | 1864 | Diego Coello de Portugal y Quesada | |
| 1864 | 1865 | Cayo Quiñones de León | Marqués de San Carlos |
| 1865 | 1866 | Tomás Ligués y Bardají | Marqués de Alhama |
| 1866 | 1868 | Cayo Quíñones de León | 2nd term |
| 1868 | 1868 | Bonifacio de Blas y Muñoz | |
| 1868 | 1871 | Eduardo Asquerino | |
| 1871 | 1872 | Adolfo Patxot y Achával | |
| 1872 | 1874 | José Antonio de Aguilar | |
| 1874 | 1875 | José Álvarez de Toledo, conde de Xiquena | |
| 1874 | 1875 | Carlos O’Donnell | 2nd Duke of Tetuán |
| 1875 | 1885 | Rafael Carlos Merry del Val | |
| 1886 | 1887 | Juan Valera y Alcalá-Galiano | |
| 1888 | 1895 | José Gutiérrez de Agüera | |
| 1895 | 1897 | Cipriano Muñoz y Manzano | 2nd Count of la Viñaza |
| 1897 | 1902 | Wenceslao Ramírez de Villa-Urrutia | |
| 1902 | 1904 | José Brunetti, Duke of Arcos | |
| 1904 | 1906 | Juan Pérez-Caballero y Ferrer | |
| 1906 | 1910 | Arturo de Baguer y Corsi | |
| 1910 | 1913 | Alfonso Merry del Val y Zulueta | |
| 1913 | 1926 | Rodrigo de Saavedra y Vinent | Marqués de Villalobar |
| 1926 | 1928 | Emilio de Palacios y Fau | |
| 1928 | 1931 | Francisco Gutiérrez de Agüera y Bayo | |
| 1931 | 1934 | Salvador Albert | |
| 1934 | 1936 | Manuel Aguirre de Cárcer | |
| 1936 | 1937 | Ángel Ossorio y Gallardo | |
| 1937 | 1939 | Mariano Ruiz Funes | |
| 1939 | 1941 | Eduardo Aunós Pérez | |
| 1951 | 1956 | Carlos de Miranda y Quartín | 4th Count of Casa Miranda |
| 1964 | 1967 | José Núñez Iglesias | |
| 1967 | 1972 | Jaime Alba y Delibes | |
| 1973 | 1976 | Francisco Javier Elorza y Echániz | |
| 1976 | 1982 | Nuño Aguirre de Cárcer y López de Sagredo | |
| 1982 | 1985 | Fernando Olivié González-Pumariega | |
| 1985 | 1990 | Mariano Berdejo Rivera | - |
| 1990 | 1994 | Nicolás Martínez-Fresno y Pavía | - |
| 1994 | 1997 | Joaquín Ortega Salinas | - |
| 1997 | 2000 | Manuel de Benavides y López-Escobar | - |
| 2000 | 2004 | Francisco Fernández Fábregas | - |
| 2004 | 2007 | María Victoria Morera Villuendas | - |
| 2007 | 2010 | Carlos Gómez-Múgica Sanz | - |
| 2010 | 2012 | Silvia Iranzo Gutiérrez | - |
| 2012 | 2016 | Ignacio Jesus Matellanes Martínez | - |
| 2016 | 2018 | Cecilia Yuste Rojas | - |
| 2018 | 2022 | Beatriz Larrotcha Palma | - |
| 2022 | 2025 | Alberto Antón Cortés | - |
| 2025 | - | José María Rodríguez Coso | |

== See also ==
- Belgium–Spain relations
- Foreign relations of Spain
