= Ángel Ossorio y Gallardo =

Spanish lawyer and statesman (1873–1946)

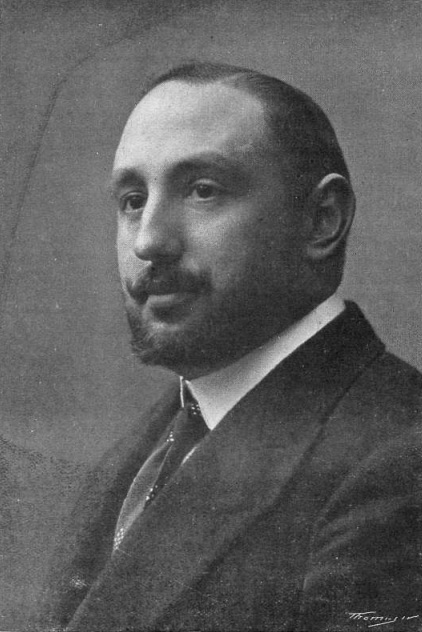

Angel Ossorio y Gallardo (b. Madrid, 20 June 1873 - d. Buenos Aires, 19 May 1946) was a Spanish lawyer and statesman. He served as Minister of Development during the reign of Alfonso XIII and later was a staunch supporter of the Second Spanish Republic. He died in exile in Argentina.

== Education and academic career ==
Having earned his Bachelor of Law from the Central Madrid University, Ossorio y Gallardo won great prestige as a lawyer and writer in the early twentieth century, with works such as "The Soul of the Toga" and "Divorce in civil marriage". He chaired the Royal Academy of Jurisprudence and Legislation and was the chairman of the Ateneo de Madrid cultural society in 1923–1924.

== Political career ==
Ossorio was elected local councillor in Madrid in 1902. A year later, he became a congressional deputy for the Caspe district in the Zaragoza province under the banner of the Conservative Party. He would serve nine terms representing the district.

=== Governor ===
He was appointed civil governor of the province of Barcelona in January, 1907, becoming the highest central government figure in the region. In July, 1909 a series of riots and strikes broke out in Barcelona as a result of a mandatory military draft, which culminated in the events called Tragic Week. Ossorio was opposed to sending troops to quell the disturbances, but then the central government in Madrid proclaimed martial law. As a result, Ossorio resigned the office and had to be evacuated by ship. His experiences during these tragic events were reflected in his work in Barcelona, July 1909 (1910).

=== Minister ===
He served as Minister of Development between 15 April and 20 July 1919 in the government of Antonio Maura.

=== Legislator ===
In 1922, Ossorio y Gallardo was one of the founders of the Partido Social Popular, a Christian Democratic party with strong conservative roots. In 1923, he did not run for reelection and left the Spanish congress. A few months later, when General Primo de Rivera staged a coup, he temporarily left politics.

Once the Spanish Second Spanish Republic was proclaimed, Ossorio broke with many of his conservative and clerical correligionaries, in support of the new regime. He was once again elected to congress for the last time, in June 1931, under the Monarchist Without a King at the Service of the Republic (Monárquico sin Rey al servicio de la República).

=== Ambassador ===
After the outbreak of the Spanish Civil War in 1936 he was named ambassador to France, Belgium and Argentina, where he would exile himself at the end of the war and where he would die.

== Author ==
He is the author of works such as History of Catalan political thought during the war of Spain with France (1913), The Soul of Toga (1919) and Life and Sacrifice of Companys (1943).

His personal archive is located in the Pavelló de la República CRAI Library - University of Barcelona . It consists of his private correspondence, newspaper articles, and news clippings, among other documents.
