= William Minot Guertler =

German professor of metallurgy

William Minot Guertler (10 March 1880 – 21 March 1959) was a German professor of metallurgy at the Technische Hochschule Charlottenburg (now Technische Universität Berlin). He contributed to the development of metallurgy as an engineering discipline in Germany and advanced metallography with a three volume treatise. He was a member of the NSDAP from 1931.

== Life and work ==
Guertler was born in Hanover to physician Alexander Guertler (1843–1931) and Grace née Sedgewick (1858–1931). He graduated from the Hamelin Gymnasium in 1899 and went to the technical school in Hanover followed by studies at the Ludwig-Maximilians-Universität München and at the University of Göttingen where he completed his doctorate in 1904 under Gustav Tammann. He then worked as an assistant before moving to the Metallhüttenmännisches Institut in Berlin in 1907. After habilitation in 1908, he spent a year at the Massachusetts Institute of Technology. During World War I, he continued to work in Berlin and became an associate professor in 1917. In 1933, he became a full professor, and he moved to the technical school in Dresden in 1936.

Guertler married Felicitas de la Porte in 1908 and they had two daughters.
