= List of ambassadors of Spain to Argentina =

Ambassador of Spain to Argentina
- Coat of arms of Spain
- Incumbent; Joaquín María de Arístegui Laborde since 30 October 2024
- Ministry of Foreign Affairs; Secretariat of State for Ibero-America
- Style: The Most Excellent
- Residence: Buenos Aires
- Nominator: The Foreign Minister
- Appointer: The Monarch
- Term length: At the government's pleasure
- Inaugural holder: Pablo Soler y Guardiola
- Formation: 1917
- Website: Mission of Spain to Argentina

The ambassador of Spain to Argentina is the official representative of the Kingdom of Spain to the Argentine Republic.

Spain sent its first diplomatic representatives to the region in 1840s, mainly to Montevideo. Regarding what is now Argentina, the consul general in Montevideo assumed the protection of Spaniards in this area until 1855, when Jacinto Albístur was appointed as Envoy Extraordinary and Minister Plenipotentiary to the Río de la Plata states, with residence in Montevideo. After the signing of the Treaty of Recognition, Peace and Friendship of 1863 with modern Argentina, Spain established a legation in Buenos Aires and, in 1917, the envoy Pablo Soler y Guardiola was promoted to the rank of Ambassador Extraordinary and Plenipotentiary, appointing diplomats with that rank from then on.

Currently, Spain has five consulates general in the country, located in Bahía Blanca, Buenos Aires, Córdoba, Mendoza and Rosario.

== List of ambassadors ==
Name	Rank	Term	Nominated by	Appointed by	Accredited to
The consul general and chargé d'affaires in Montevideo (1845–1855)
Jacinto Albístur (Note: Resident in Montevideo.)	Minister	1855–1859	Claudio Antón de Luzuriaga	Isabella II	
Carlos Creus y Camps, a.i.	Chargé d'affaires	1859–1864	Saturnino Calderón Collantes	Isabella II	
Carlos Creus y Camps, a.i.	Minister	1864–1865	Joaquín Francisco Pacheco	Isabella II	
Pedro Sorela y Maury	Minister	1865–1869		Isabella II	Rufino de Elizalde
Carlos Antonio de España	Chargé d'affaires	1869–1871	The Viscount of Barrantes		
Norberto Ballesteros	Chargé d'affaires	1871–1873		Amadeo I	Carlos Tejedor
José Alvarez Peralta	Minister	1873–1874	Emilio Castelar	Estanislao Figueras	Carlos Tejedor
Norberto Ballesteros	Chargé d'affaires	1874–1875	Augusto Ulloa y Castañón	The Duke of the Tower	Carlos Tejedor
Justo Pérez Ruano	Chargé d'affaires	1875–1879		Alfonso XII	
Francisco Otin y Messía	Chargé d'affaires	1879–1882		Alfonso XII	
Juan Durán y Cuervo	Chargé d'affaires	1882–1883	The Marquess of Vega de Armijo	Alfonso XII	
Juan Durán y Cuervo	Minister	1883–1888	The Marquess of Vega de Armijo	Alfonso XII	
Emilio de Ojeda y Perpiñán	Minister	1888	The Marquess of Vega de Armijo	Alfonso XIII	
Salvador López Guijarro	Minister	1888–1889		Alfonso XIII	
Juan Durán y Cuervo	Minister	1889–1898	Francisco Silvela	Alfonso XIII	
Julio de Arellano y Arróspide, Marquess of Casa Calvo	Minister	1898–1904	The Duke of Almodóvar del Río	Alfonso XIII	
Ramiro Gil de Uribarri Ossorio	Minister	1904–1907		Alfonso XIII	
Luis de la Barrera y Riera	Minister	1907–1910	Juan Pérez-Caballero y Ferrer	Alfonso XIII	
Pedro Careaga de la Quintana, Count of Cadagua	Minister	1910	Juan Pérez-Caballero y Ferrer	Alfonso XIII	
Pablo Soler y Guardiola	Minister	1910–1917	The Marquess of Alhucemas	Alfonso XIII	
Pablo Soler y Guardiola	Ambassador	1917–1920	Juan Alvarado y del Saz	Alfonso XIII	Hipólito Yrigoyen
Eugenio Ferraz y Alcalá-Galiano, Marquess of Amposta	Ambassador	1920–1926	The Duke of Ripalda	Alfonso XIII	Hipólito Yrigoyen
Emilio de Palacios y Fau	Ambassador	1926	The Viscount of Santa Clara de Avedillo	Alfonso XIII	Marcelo Torcuato de Alvear
Antonio de Zayas y Beaumont, Duke of Amalfi	Ambassador	1926–1927	The Viscount of Santa Clara de Avedillo	Alfonso XIII	Marcelo Torcuato de Alvear
Ramiro de Maeztu, Count of Maeztu	Ambassador	1927–1930	The Marquess of Estella	Alfonso XIII	Marcelo Torcuato de Alvear
Alfonso Danvila y Burguero	Ambassador	1930–1931	The Count of Xauen	Alfonso XIII	José Félix Uriburu
Alfonso Danvila y Burguero	Ambassador	1931–1936	Alejandro Lerroux	Manuel Azaña	José Félix Uriburu
Enrique Díez Canedo	Ambassador	1936–1937	Augusto Barcia Trelles	Diego Martínez Barrio	Agustín Pedro Justo
Manuel Blasco Garzón (acting)	Consul General	1937–1938			
Angel Ossorio y Gallardo	Ambassador	1938–1939	Julio Álvarez del Vayo	Manuel Azaña	Roberto Marcelino Ortiz
Juan Pablo de Lojendio Irure (Note: Representing the Junta Técnica del Estado (1936–1938) and the first government of Francisco Franco (1938–1940).)	Chargé d'affaires	1939–1940		Francisco Franco	Roberto Marcelino Ortiz
Antonio Magaz, Marquess of Magaz	Ambassador	1940–1943	Juan Luis Beigbeder	Francisco Franco	Roberto Marcelino Ortiz
José Muñoz Vargas, Count of Bulnes	Ambassador	1943–1947	Francisco Gómez-Jordana Sousa	Francisco Franco	Pedro Pablo Ramírez
José María de Areilza, Count of Motrico	Ambassador	1947–1950	Alberto Martín-Artajo	Francisco Franco	Juan Perón
Emilio de Navasqüés	Ambassador	1950–1951	Alberto Martín-Artajo	Francisco Franco	Juan Perón
Manuel Aznar Zubigaray	Ambassador	1951–1955	Alberto Martín-Artajo	Francisco Franco	Juan Perón
José María Alfaro Polanco	Ambassador	1955–1971	Alberto Martín-Artajo	Francisco Franco	Juan Perón
José Sebastián de Erice y O'Shea	Ambassador	1971–1973	Gregorio López-Bravo	Francisco Franco	Alejandro Agustín Lanusse
Luis García de Llera y Rodríguez	Ambassador	1973–1974	Gregorio López-Bravo	Francisco Franco	Alejandro Agustín Lanusse
Gregorio Marañón Moya, Marquess of Marañón	Ambassador	1974–1976	Laureano López Rodó	Francisco Franco	Juan Perón
Enrique Pérez Hernández y Moreno	Ambassador	1976–1982	The Marquess of Oreja	Juan Carlos I	Jorge Rafael Videla
Manuel Alabart Miranda, Marquess of Busianos	Ambassador	1982–1983	José Pedro Pérez-Llorca	Juan Carlos I	Leopoldo Galtieri
José Luis Messía	Ambassador	1983–1986	Fernando Morán	Juan Carlos I	Reynaldo Bignone
Raimundo Bassols	Ambassador	1986–1991	Francisco Fernández Ordóñez	Juan Carlos I	Raúl Alfonsín
Rafael Pastor Ridruejo	Ambassador	1991–1994	Francisco Fernández Ordóñez	Juan Carlos I	Carlos Menem
Nicolás Martínez-Fresno y Pavía	Ambassador	1994–1996	Javier Solana	Juan Carlos I	Carlos Menem
Carlos Carderera Soler	Ambassador	1996–2000	Abel Matutes	Juan Carlos I	Carlos Menem
Manuel Alabart	Ambassador	2000–2004	Josep Piqué	Juan Carlos I	Fernando de la Rúa
Carmelo Angulo Barturen	Ambassador	2004–2006	Miguel Ángel Moratinos	Juan Carlos I	Néstor Kirchner
Rafael Estrella	Ambassador	2006–2012	Miguel Ángel Moratinos	Juan Carlos I	Néstor Kirchner
Román Oyarzun Marchesi	Ambassador	2012–2013	José Manuel García-Margallo	Juan Carlos I	Cristina Fernández de Kirchner
Estanislao de Grandes	Ambassador	2013–2017	José Manuel García-Margallo	Juan Carlos I	Cristina Fernández de Kirchner
Francisco Javier Sandomingo	Ambassador	2017–2022	Alfonso Dastis	Felipe VI	Mauricio Macri
María Jesús Alonso Jiménez	Ambassador	2022–2024	José Manuel Albares	Felipe VI	Alberto Fernández
Joaquín María de Arístegui Laborde	Ambassador	2024–pres.	José Manuel Albares	Felipe VI	Javier Milei

== See also ==
- Argentina–Spain relations
