= Carlos Bastarreche =

Spanish diplomat

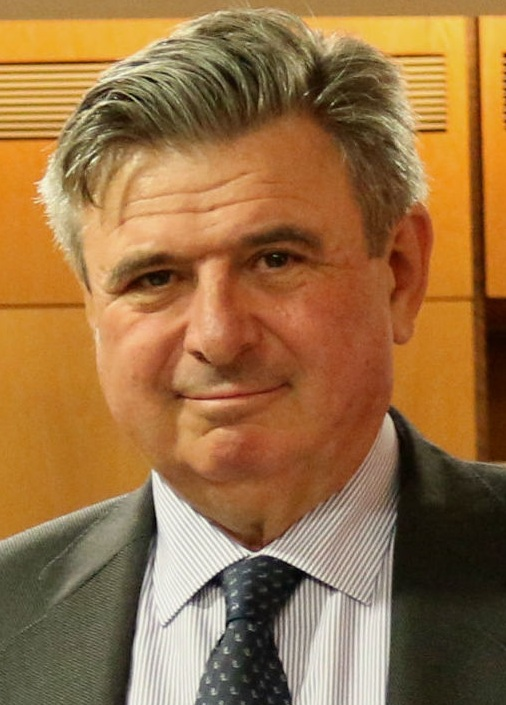
- Bastarreche in 2018

Ambassador of Spain to the United Kingdom
- In office 25 February 2017 – 3 February 2021
- Preceded by: Federico Trillo
- Succeeded by: José Pascual Marco Martínez

Ambassador of Spain to France accredited to Monaco
- In office 18 September 2010 (Note: To Monaco since 9 November 2013) – 17 May 2014
- Preceded by: Francisco Villar Ortiz de Urbina
- Succeeded by: Ramón de Miguel y Egea

Ambassador Permanent Representative of Spain to the European Union
- In office 7 September 2002 – 18 September 2010
- Preceded by: Francisco Javier Conde de Saro
- Succeeded by: Luis Planas
Other posts
Secretary-General for the European Affairs
In office 20 May 2000 – 7 September 2002
Preceded by	Himself
Succeeded by	Alfonso Dastis
Secretary-General for Foreign Policy and European Union
In office 14 May 1996 – 20 May 2000
Preceded by	Francisco Villar Ortiz de Urbina (foreign policy); Francisco Javier Conde de Saro (European Union)
Succeeded by	Himself (european affairs); Javier Garrigues Flórez (foreign affairs)
Deputy Permanent Representative of Spain to the European Union
In office 3 April 1991 – 14 May 1996
Preceded by	The Marquess of Nerva
Succeeded by	Miguel Ángel Navarro Portera

Personal details
- Born: 27 November 1950 (age 75) Madrid, Spain
- Spouse: Rosalía Gómez-Pineda Goizueta
- Children: 4

Carlos Bastarreche Sagües (born 27 November 1950) is a Spanish retired diplomat, known for his time in the Permanent Representation of Spain to the European Union.

== Biography ==
Graduated in law and with a diploma in international studies, he joined the diplomatic service in 1976.

In his early years, he served as secretary at the Consular and Commercial Representation in Romania, secretary at the Spanish Mission to the European Communities, and advisor to the Secretary of State for the European Communities.

He subsequently served as deputy director-general of European Coordination for Institutional Relations (1985) and, later, as director-general for European Legal and Institutional Coordination (1990).

He was dismissed in December 1995 and in May 1996 he was appointed Secretary-General for Foreign Policy and European Union and, between 2000 and 2002, he was Secretary-General for European Affairs. At the end of this last year he was rewarded for his services with the Grand Cross of the Order of Isabella the Catholic.

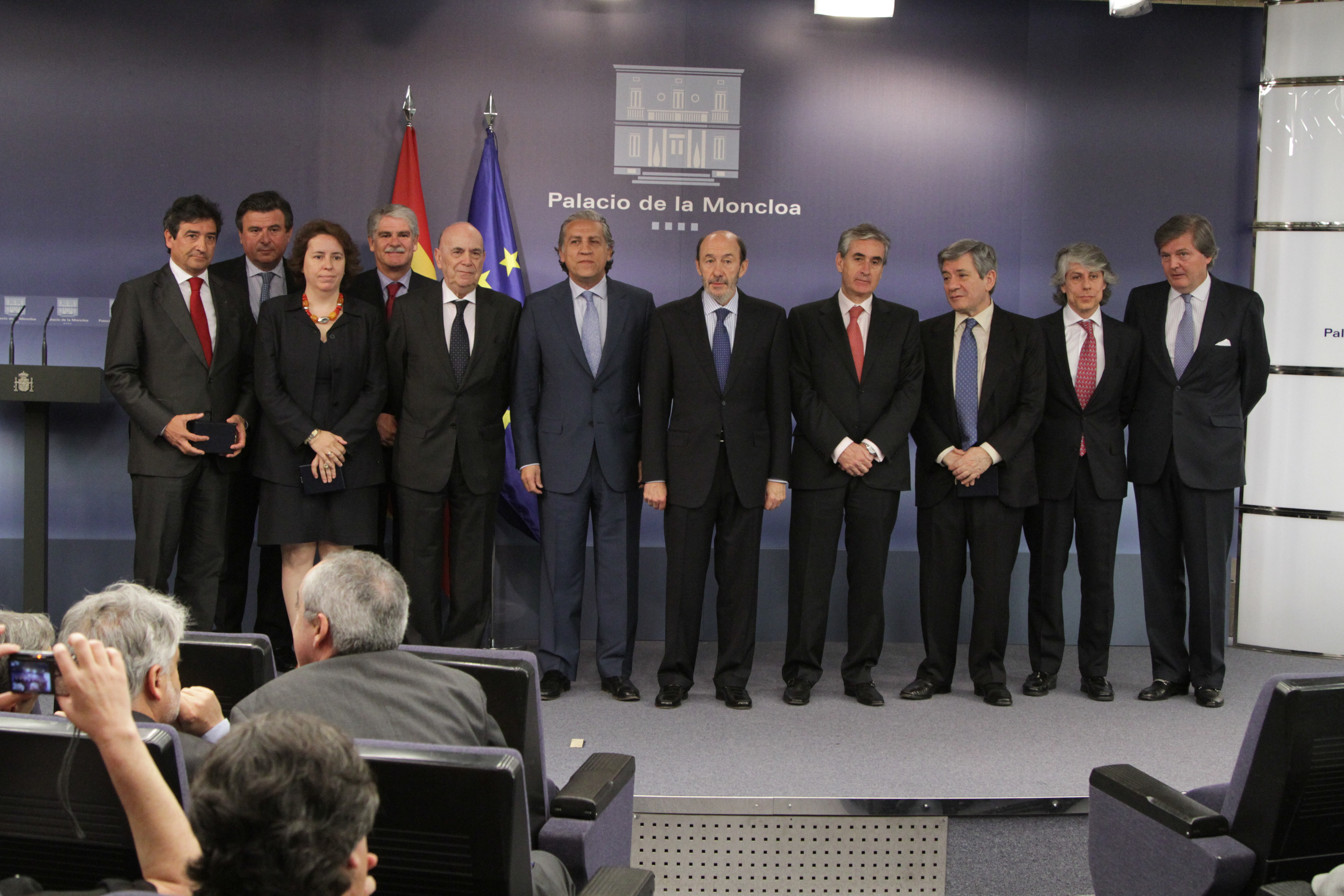
Bastarreche (in the background on the left), in 2011, during the presentation of the Medals of the Order of Constitutional Merit.

He was immediately sent back to Brussels, this time as Ambassador Permanent Representative of Spain to the European Union, serving for eight years until September 2010, the longest term since Alberto Ullastres between 1965 and 1976 and doubling the average for most ambassadors, which is usually four years. During this period he actively participated in the Convention on the Future of Europe, being rewarded with the Medal of the Order of Constitutional Merit.

In September 2010 he was appointed ambassador to the French Republic and, although he had some disagreements with the secretary of state Diego López Garrido, which predicted his dismissal, he remained in office until May 2014. Since November 2013, he also served as the first ambassador of Spain to the Principality of Monaco, with residence in Paris. After his time in the French capital, he was hired by Airbus as director of institutional relations for Spain.

In January 2017 the Council of Ministers dismissed, after five years, Federico Trillo from the Embassy of Spain, London. In the same meeting, the government also gave the go-ahead to request the British authorities' approval for his replacement, Bastarreche, which was granted the following month. Despite reaching legal retirement age in November 2020, the government kept him in office until February 2021 because, according to the then secretary of state, Juan González-Barba Pera, "if it hasn't been done so far, it's because it's a vital embassy. We want to see how Brexit and the negotiations over Gibraltar end".

After retiring from the diplomatic career, he is an external advisor to the Spanish Banking Association (AEB) and the Spanish Confederation of Savings Banks (CECA), the main banking sector associations.
