= Camilo Barcia García-Villamil =

Spanish diplomat and economist

Ambassador of Spain to New Zealand
- In office April 22, 2006 – October 30, 2007
- Preceded by: José Ramón Barañano Fernández
- Succeeded by: Marcos Gómez Martínez

Ambassador of Spain to Sweden and Latvia
- In office July 27, 1994 (Note: To Latvia since October 27, 1994) – May 21, 1998
- Preceded by: Antonio Serrano de Haro
- Succeeded by: María Cristina Barrios y Almazor

Ambassador Permanent Representative of Spain to the European Communities
- In office March 28, 1991 – July 27, 1994
- Preceded by: Carlos Westendorp
- Succeeded by: The Marquess of Nerva
Other posts
Ambassador of Spain to Japan
In office June 22, 1985 – May 12, 1990
Preceded by	Eduardo Ibáñez y García de Velasco
Succeeded by	Antonio de Oyarzabal
Deputy Permanent Representative of Spain to the European Communities
In office 1979–1985
Succeeded by	The Marquess of Nerva
Ambassador of Spain to the United Arab Emirates and Qatar
In office May 25, 1977 (Note: To Qatar since February 23, 1978) – July 11, 1979
Preceded by	Andrés Drake Alvear
Succeeded by	Fausto Navarro Izquierdo

Personal details
- Born: October 28, 1937 Ribadeo, Spain
- Died: December 7, 2018 (aged 81) Madrid, Spain
- Occupation: Diplomat

Camilo Barcia García-Villamil (28 October 1937 – 7 December 2018) was a Spanish diplomat and economist.

== Family and education ==
Barcia was born in Ribadeo, Lugo in 1937. He was the son of a well-known Spanish internationalist Camilo Barcia Trelles and he was also the nephew of Augusto Barcia Trelles, a politician that served as minister of state during the Second Republic and, briefly, as acting prime minister.

He married María Carmela Bustelo, cousin of The Marquess of Ría de Ribadeo, prime minister from 1981 to 1982.

Barcia attended to the University of Santiago de Compostela, where he graduated in law with Bachelor's Degree Extraordinary Award. Later, he studied a Bachelor of Economics at the University of Cambridge.

== Career ==
Like his brother Emilio had done a few years earlier, Camilo entered the diplomatic service in 1965. His first post was as Secretary-General of the Spanish Negotiating Delegation with the European Communities, and he was also Secretary of the Interministerial Committee for Relations with the European Communities (1965–1970). Later, he served as Secretary of the Embassy of Spain to the United Nations Office and International Organizations in Geneva and, briefly, he left the diplomatic career to chair over the Society for the Industrial Development of Galicia (SODIGA), a regional state-owned enterprise.

Back in the diplomatic career, in 1977 he was assigned as head of mission to the United Arab Emirates, with dual accreditation to Qatar, until 1979. After this, he was sent to the Spanish Mission to the European Communities where, as deputy head of mission, he actively participated in the negotiations for Spain's accession to the Communities. For this reason, King Juan Carlos I named him Commander by Number the Order of Isabella the Catholic.

After his successes in Brussels, he was appointed ambassador of Spain to Japan, serving in the position for around five years until 1991, when he was ordered to return to the Mission of Spain to the European Communities, this time as ambassador permanent representative, until 1994.

For the next thirteen years, he would be posted in Sweden (1994–1998), with dual accreditation to Latvia (1994–1998), and New Zealand (2006–2007). He retired from the Foreign Service in late October 2007, at the age of 70.

He died in Madrid, on December 7, 2018, at the age of 81.
