= Francisco Javier Elorza y Cavengt, 4th Marquess of Nerva =

Spanish diplomat and aristocrat

The Marquess of Nerva
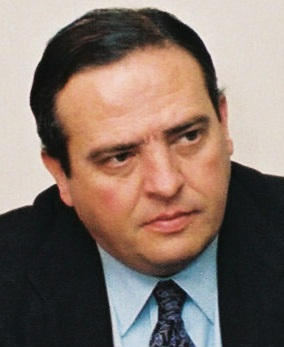
- The Marquess of Nerva in 1995

Ambassador of Spain to Italy and San Marino
- In office April 21, 2012 (Note: To San Marino since June 2, 2012) – December 10, 2016
- Preceded by: Alfonso Lucini Mateo
- Succeeded by: Jesús Manuel Gracia Aldaz

Ambassador of Spain to India accreditated to Sri Lanka, Maldives, Nepal and Bhutan
- In office February 5, 2011 (Note: To Sri Lanka and Maldives since March 26, 2011, to Nepal since May 21, 2011 and to Butan since June 18, 2011) – April 14, 2012
- Preceded by: Ion de la Riva
- Succeeded by: Gustavo de Arístegui

Secretary-General for Consular and Migration Affairs
- In office May 10, 2008 – July 27, 2010
- Preceded by: Office established
- Succeeded by: Santiago Cabanas

Ambassador of Spain to Russia accreditated to Georgia, Uzbekistan, Armenia, Turkmenistan and Belarus
- In office June 26, 2004 (Note: To Georgia since December 11, 2004, to Uzbekistan since December 29, 2004, to Armenia since February 26, 2005 and to Turkmenistan and Belarus since March 22, 2005) – December 29, 2007
- Preceded by: José María Robles Fraga
- Succeeded by: Juan Antonio March Pujol
Other posts
Ambassador of Spain to France
In office June 24, 2000 – June 26, 2004
Preceded by	Carlos Manuel de Benavides y Salas
Succeeded by	Francisco Villar Ortiz de Urbina
Ambassador Permanent Representative of Spain to the European Union
In office July 27, 1994 – June 24, 2000
Preceded by	Camilo Barcia García-Villamil
Succeeded by	Francisco Javier Conde de Saro
Secretary-General for the European Communities
In office April 3, 1991 – July 27, 1994
Preceded by	Rafael Pastor Ridruejo
Succeeded by	Francisco Javier Conde de Saro
Deputy Permanent Representative of Spain to the European Communities
In office March 17, 1986 – April 3, 1991
Preceded by	Camilo Barcia García-Villamil
Succeeded by	Carlos Bastarreche

Personal details
- Born: October 17, 1945 Madrid, Spain
- Education: Complutense University of Madrid
- Occupation: Diplomat

Francisco Javier Elorza y Cavengt, 4th Marquess of Nerva (born October 17, 1945) is a Spanish aristocrat and retired diplomat.

== Biography ==
Elorza was born in Madrid, being the eldest child of diplomat Francisco Javier Elorza y Echániz and aristocrat María del Pilar Cavengt y Martín de Oliva, 3rd Marchioness of Nerva.

He attended the Complutense University of Madrid, graduating in law with Bachelor's Degree Extraordinary Award. He joined the diplomatic service in 1971. Early in his career, he served at the Spanish diplomatic missions in Morocco and at the Permanent Representation of Spain to the European Communities. He served as deputy director-general for Economy and Planning at the Ministry of Transport and Communications and as deputy director-general for European Integration Organizations and International Economic Relations at the Ministry of Foreign Affairs.

In 1986 he returned to the Permanent Representation of Spain to the European Communities as deputy ambassador, replacing Camilo Barcia García-Villamil. In 1991 he was called back to Madrid to occupy the General Secretariat for the European Communities (second to the secretary of state) and, three years later, he again replaced Camilo Barcia, this time as ambassador permanent representative of Spain to the European Communities, moment when the Spanish mission was renamed as "Representation of Spain to the European Union."

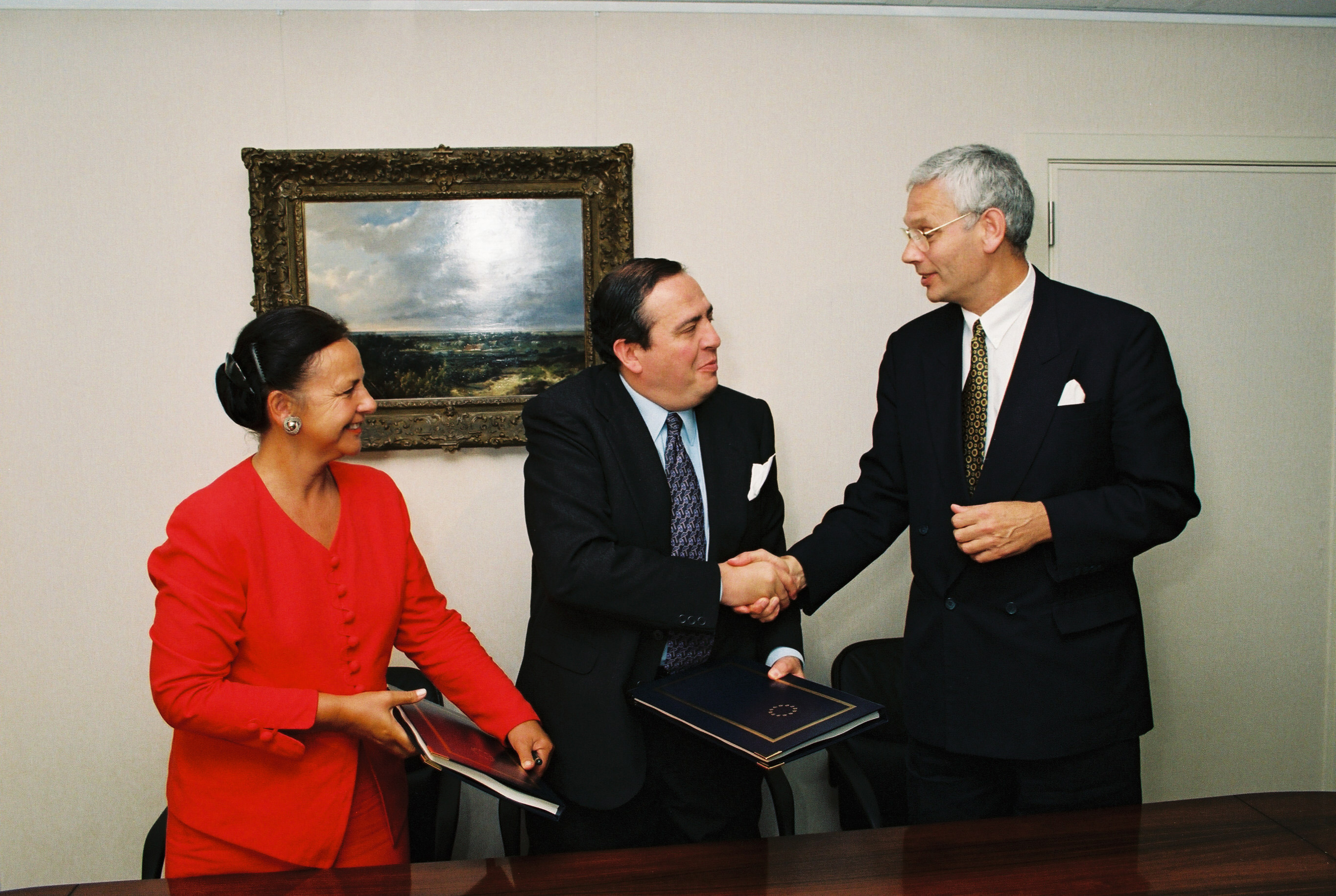
Elorza, with Norwegian minister Grete Knudsen, handshaking commissioner Hans van den Broek, 1995

During this years, closely involved in European affairs, Elorza negotiated the incorporation of Spain into the Schengen Area, as well as the Maastricht Treaty and the Treaty of Amsterdam, among others. It was precisely at this time that he was described as a "diplomatic tank" for his tough defense of Spanish interests at the weekly COREPER meetings, and that "most people respected Elorza but some really hated him".

After the death of his mother, in 1998 he inherited the title of Marquess of Nerva.

After almost six years in Brussels, he was assigned to Paris, where he served as ambassador from 2000 to 2004. After the change of government in 2004, he was appointed ambassador to the Russian Federation, with dual accreditation to Georgia, Uzbekistan, Armenia, Turkmenistan and Belarus. He was dismissed in December 2007.

In May 2008 he was tasked with leading the new General Secretariat for Consular and Migration Affairs, coordinating the Spanish consular policy, the protection of Spaniards abroad and management of consular social assistance.

The marquess last assignments before retirement were to India, with dual accreditation to Sri Lanka, Maldives, Nepal and Bhutan, between February 2011 and April 2012, and to Italy, with dual accreditation to San Marino, between April 2012 and December 2016.
