= Permanent Representative of Spain to the European Union =

Senior diplomat

Ambassador Permanent Representative of Spain to the European Union
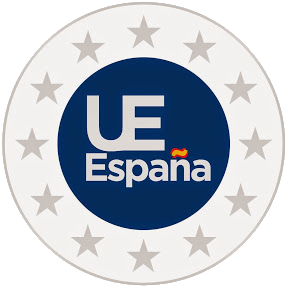
- Spanish Permanent Representation

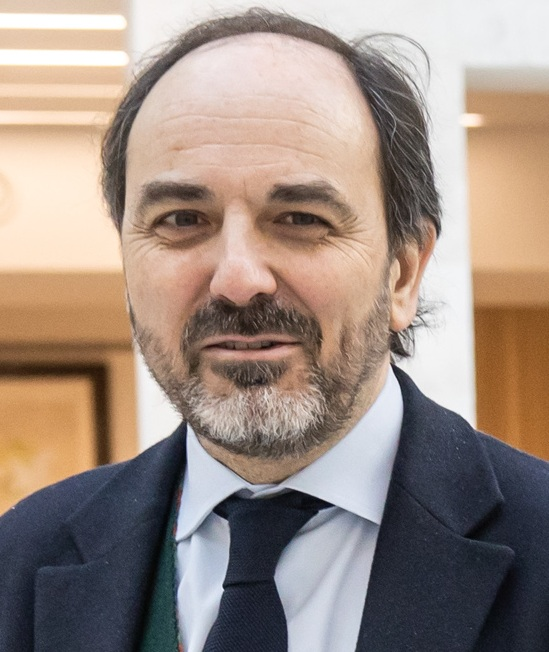
- Incumbent; Marcos Alonso Alonso since 21 July 2021
- Ministry of Foreign Affairs; Secretariat of State for the European Union
- Style: The Most Excellent
- Member of: Committee of Permanent Representatives
- Reports to: Secretary of State for the European Union
- Residence: Boulevard du Régent, 52; 1000 Brussels
- Nominator: The Foreign Minister
- Appointer: The Monarch
- Inaugural holder: Carlos de Miranda y Quartín, 4th Count of Casa Miranda
- Formation: 9 December 1960; 65 years ago
- Deputy: Deputy Ambassador Permanent Representative of Spain to the European Union
- Website: Spanish Mission to the EU

The ambassador permanent representative of Spain to the European Union is the official representative of the Kingdom of Spain to the institutions of the European Union. As such, it is the official responsible for carrying out the guidelines established by the Minister of Foreign Affairs or, by delegation, by the Secretary of State for the European Union.

== Permanent Representation ==
The Permanent Representation depends administratively and economically on the Ministry of Foreign Affairs, through the Secretariat of State for the European Union. The law defines it as "the accredited body, representative and management, by Spain to the European Union and ensure the presence of Spain in the institutions and bodies dependent on it."

The mission is headed by the Ambassador Permanent Representative. As a collaborator and substitute for the Ambassador, there is a Deputy Ambassador Permanent Representative, who is also appointed by the Government, at the proposal of the Minister of Foreign Affairs and after hearing the Interministerial Committee for the European Union Affairs. The representation is also made up of the Ambassador Permanent Representative of Spain to the Political and Security Committee (PSC).

Apart from the aforementioned senior positions, the representation is composed of lesser diplomatic personnel such as advisers, embassy secretaries and attachés, who are freely appointed by the minister. Non-diplomatic personnel are appointed by the foreign minister at the proposal of the ministerial department that requests it.

== Interministerial Committee for the European Union Affairs ==
Following Spain's accession into the European Communities, the Interministerial Committee for European Union Affairs was established in September 1985. The committee's work focuses on coordinating the actions of the General State Administration in matters related to the European Union and examining and resolving, where appropriate, EU affairs that affect more than one ministerial department and do not require referral to the Government Delegated Committee for Economic Affairs. If any of these issues arise, due to their importance or because a member of the committee requests it, they must be referred to the aforementioned delegated committee.

The Interministerial Committee is chaired by the Secretary of State for the European Union, while the First Deputy Chair is the Secretary of State for Economy and Business Support. This committee also includes the other senior officials from the Ministry of Foreign Affairs responsible for European policy, as well as the undersecretaries of all government departments.

== History ==
=== Origin ===
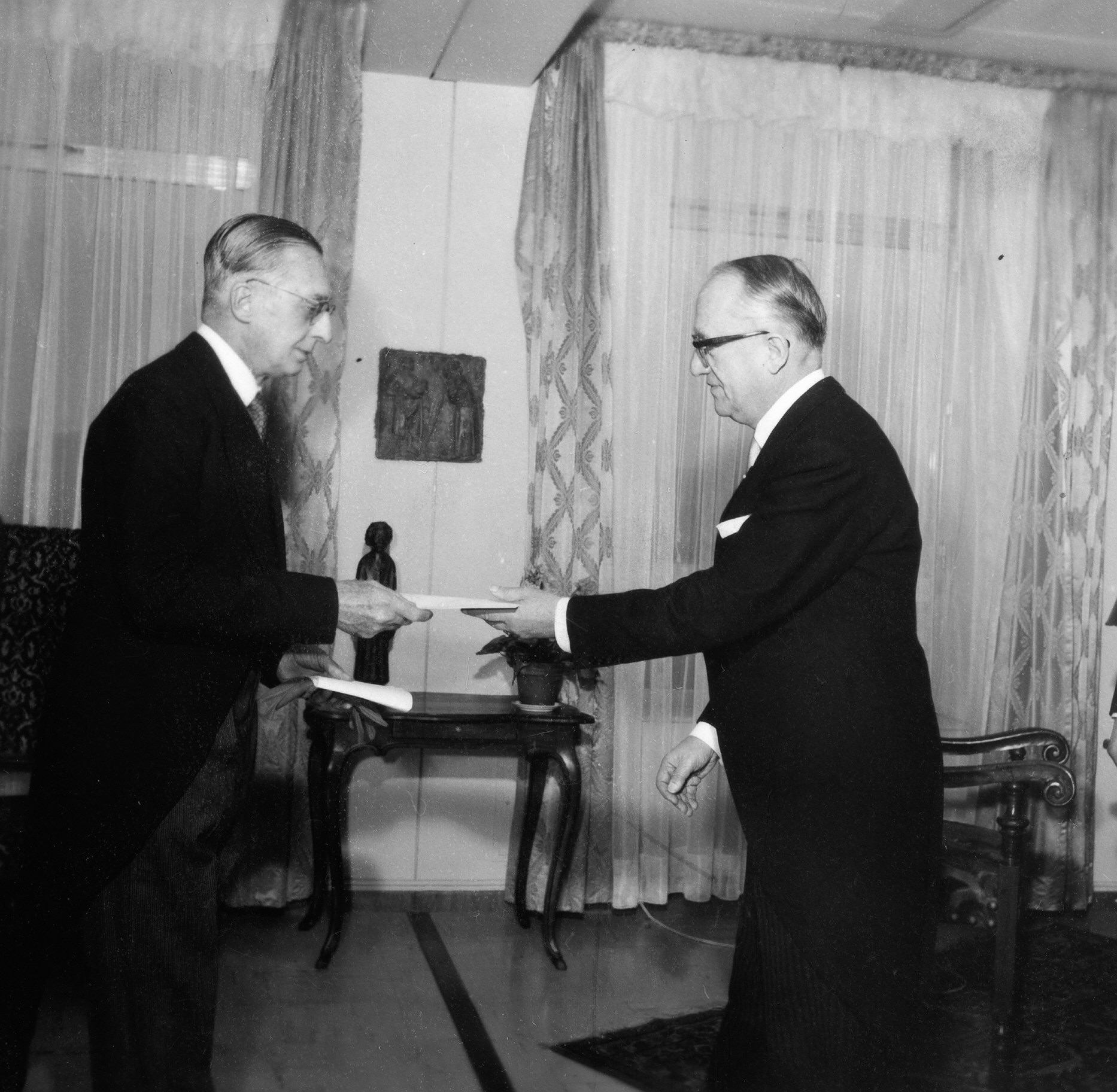
Ambassador Carlos de Miranda y Quartín, 4th Count of Casa Miranda (left), presenting credentials to President Walter Hallstein. 1960

The origin of the Spanish Representation to the European Union dates back to 1960, when Carlos de Miranda y Quartín, 4th Count of Casa Miranda, ambassador to Belgium and Luxembourg, was entrusted with representing Spanish interests within the European Economic Community. He also represented Spain within the European Coal and Steel Community and the European Atomic Energy Community.

Since 1965, this position was separated from the Embassy in Brussels, with the former trade minister, Alberto Ullastres, being appointed ambassador. Ullastres enjoyed great autonomy in managing European diplomatic relations and, under his leadership, important treaties such as the Preferential Trade Agreement between Spain and the European Economic Community of 1970 were negotiated.

Later, prime minister Adolfo Suárez entrusted Raimundo Bassols with representing and negotiating, together with minister Marcelino Oreja, 1st Marquess of Oreja, Spain's entry into the organization. It was they who, in July 1977, formally requested accession to the Communities, initiating long negotiations that would culminate years later, during the mandate of ambassador Gabriel Ferrán de Alfaro.

=== Representation to the EU ===
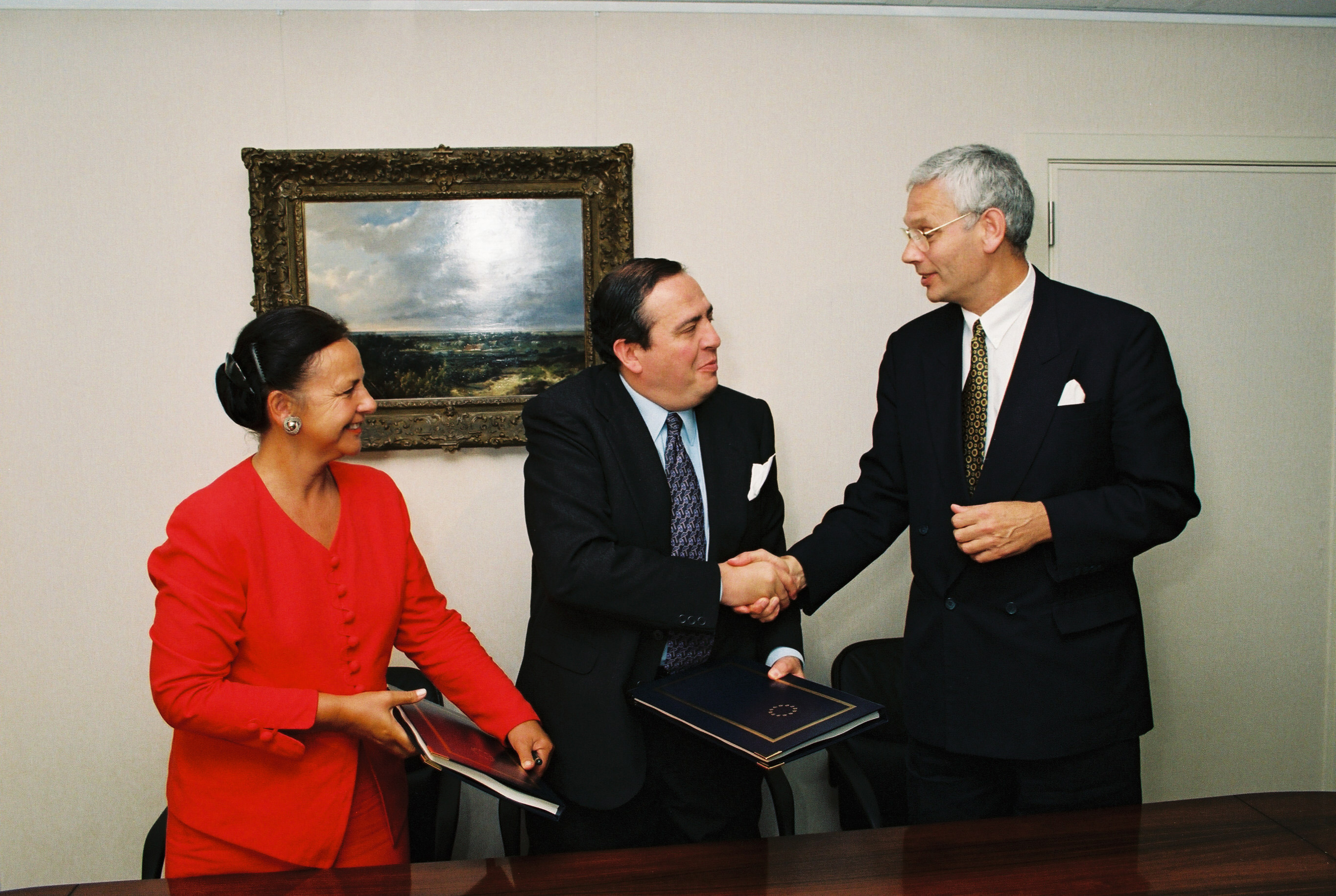
Spanish ambassador to the EU, Francisco Javier Elorza Cavengt, handshaking Commissioner Hans van den Broek, 1995

In late 1985, Spain and the European Communities finalized the negotiations for the admission of the Iberian nation in the Communities. The Accession Treaty was signed on 12 June 1985. At the same time, the Spanish government transformed the Mission of Spain to the European Communities into the Permanent Representation of Spain to the European Communities, similar to the diplomatic missions of the rest of the member states of the European Union.

With the signing of the Treaty of the European Union in Maastricht in 1992, the European Communities disappear and the current European Union is properly created, so the name of the Permanent Representation is changed to the current Permanent Representation of Spain to the European Union in December 1995.

Spain has presided over the Council of the European Union on five occasions: January–June 1989, July–December 1995, January–June 2002, January–June 2010 and July–December 2023.

== List of ambassadors ==
For the purposes of this list, the date of publication of the appointment or dismissal in the Official State Gazette is taken into account.

Ambassador (Birth–Death)		Term of office			Prime Minister (Tenure)	Head of State (Tenure)	Ref.
Ambassador (Birth–Death)		Took office	Left office	Duration	Prime Minister (Tenure)	Head of State (Tenure)	Ref.
1	Carlos de Miranda y Quartín; Count of Casa Miranda (1895–1968)	9 December 1960 (Note: Date on which credentials were presented.)	11 November 1964	3 years and 338 days	Francisco Franco (1939–1975)		
2	José Núñez Iglesias (1897–1984)	21 November 1964	8 October 1965	321 days	Francisco Franco (1939–1975)		
3	Alberto Ullastres (1914–2001)	8 October 1965	13 November 1976	11 years and 35 days	Francisco Franco (1939–1975)		
3	Alberto Ullastres (1914–2001)	8 October 1965	13 November 1976	11 years and 35 days	Luis Carrero Blanco (1973)		
3	Alberto Ullastres (1914–2001)	8 October 1965	13 November 1976	11 years and 35 days	Carlos Arias Navarro (1973–1976)		
3	Alberto Ullastres (1914–2001)	8 October 1965	13 November 1976	11 years and 35 days	Carlos Arias Navarro (1973–1976)	Juan Carlos I (1975–2014)	
3	Alberto Ullastres (1914–2001)	8 October 1965	13 November 1976	11 years and 35 days	Adolfo Suárez (1976–1981)	Juan Carlos I (1975–2014)	
4	Raimundo Bassols (born 1926)	13 November 1976	28 February 1981	4 years and 107 days	Adolfo Suárez (1976–1981)	Juan Carlos I (1975–2014)	
5	Gabriel Ferrán de Alfaro (born 1932)	12 June 1981	28 November 1985	4 years and 169 days	Leopoldo Calvo-Sotelo (1981–1982)	Juan Carlos I (1975–2014)	
5	Gabriel Ferrán de Alfaro (born 1932)	12 June 1981	28 November 1985	4 years and 169 days	Felipe González (1982–1996)	Juan Carlos I (1975–2014)	
6	Carlos Westendorp (1937–2026)	31 December 1985	16 March 1991	5 years and 75 days	Felipe González (1982–1996)	Juan Carlos I (1975–2014)	
7	Camilo Barcia García-Villamil (1937–2018)	28 March 1991	27 July 1994	3 years and 121 days	Felipe González (1982–1996)	Juan Carlos I (1975–2014)	
8	Francisco Javier Elorza y Cavengt; Marquess of Nerva (born 1945)	27 July 1994	24 June 2000	5 years and 333 days	Felipe González (1982–1996)	Juan Carlos I (1975–2014)	
8	Francisco Javier Elorza y Cavengt; Marquess of Nerva (born 1945)	27 July 1994	24 June 2000	5 years and 333 days	José María Aznar (1996–2004)	Juan Carlos I (1975–2014)	
9	Francisco Javier Conde de Saro (born 1946)	24 June 2000	7 September 2002	2 years and 75 days	José María Aznar (1996–2004)	Juan Carlos I (1975–2014)	
10	Carlos Bastarreche (born 1950)	7 September 2002	18 September 2010	8 years and 11 days	José María Aznar (1996–2004)	Juan Carlos I (1975–2014)	
10	Carlos Bastarreche (born 1950)	7 September 2002	18 September 2010	8 years and 11 days	José Luis Rodríguez Zapatero (2004–2011)	Juan Carlos I (1975–2014)	
11	Luis Planas (born 1952)	5 October 2010	31 December 2011	1 year and 87 days	José Luis Rodríguez Zapatero (2004–2011)	Juan Carlos I (1975–2014)	
12	Alfonso Dastis (born 1955)	31 December 2011	4 November 2016	4 years and 309 days	Mariano Rajoy (2011–2018)	Juan Carlos I (1975–2014)	
12	Alfonso Dastis (born 1955)	31 December 2011	4 November 2016	4 years and 309 days	Mariano Rajoy (2011–2018)	Felipe VI (2014–present)	
13	Juan Pablo García-Berdoy (born 1961)	3 December 2016	21 July 2021	4 years and 230 days	Mariano Rajoy (2011–2018)	Felipe VI (2014–present)	
13	Juan Pablo García-Berdoy (born 1961)	3 December 2016	21 July 2021	4 years and 230 days	Pedro Sánchez (2018–present)	Felipe VI (2014–present)	
14	Marcos Alonso Alonso (born 1970)	21 July 2021	Incumbent	5 years and 103 days	Pedro Sánchez (2018–present)	Felipe VI (2014–present)	

== List of deputy ambassadors ==
- Camilo Barcia García-Villamil (1979 – 22 June 1985)
- Francisco Javier Elorza y Cavengt, 4th Marquess of Nerva (17 March 1986 – 3 April 1991)
- Carlos Bastarreche (3 April 1991 – 14 May 1996)
- Miguel Ángel Navarro Portera (14 May 1996 – 11 January 2003)
- Cristóbal González-Aller Jurado (11 January 2003 – 4 September 2010)
- José Pascual Marco Martínez (4 September 2010 – 1 August 2015)
- Juan de Arístegui Laborde (1 August 2015 – 12 February 2020)
- Raúl Santiago Fuentes Milani (12 February 2020 – 3 July 2024)
- Oriol Escalas Nolla (3 July 2024 – present)

== List of representatives to the Political and Security Committee ==
Created the Political and Security Committee by the Treaty of Amsterdam, in 2000 it was created a Representation to it, with its officeholder having the rank of ambassador. Since 2012, this Representation is part of the Permanent Representation to the EU.

- Manuel Lorenzo García-Ormaechea (18 March 2000 – 27 March 2001)
- Carlos María Casajuana Palet (27 March 2001 – 1 May 2004)
- Alfonso Lucini Mateo (1 May 2004 – 19 July 2008)
- Carlos Enrique Fernández-Arias Minuesa (2 August 2008 – 11 February 2012)
- Nicolás Pascual de la Parte (11 February 2012 – 22 April 2017)
- Manuel Antonio Acerete Gómez (22 April 2017 – 23 June 2021)
- María Elena Gómez Castro (23 June 2021 – 31 July 2024)
- Guillermo Ardizone García (31 July 2024 – present)
