= List of ambassadors of Spain to France =

The ambassador of Spain to France is the official representative of the Kingdom of Spain in the French Republic through the Embassy of Spain in France. Since 2013, the ambassador also represents Spain to the Principality of Monaco.

== Function ==
Appointed by the Council of Ministers, the Ambassador of Spain to France directs the work of all the offices that depend on the embassy, based in the city of Paris. He also informs the Spanish government about the evolution of events in France, negotiates in the name of Spain, can sign or ratify agreements, observes the development of bilateral relations in all fields and ensures the protection of Spanish interests and its citizens in France.The current ambassador is Victorio Redondo Baldrich, who was appointed by the Government of Pedro Sánchez on 29 September 2021.

== List of Ambassadors since 1454 ==
Ambassador	Start date	End date	References
Fortún Velázquez de Cuéllar	1454		
Juan Ruiz de Medina & Juan de Gamboa	1477	1479	
Andrés de Villalón & Hernando de Mazuelo	1480	1480	
Italian Wars	1494	1559	
Miguel Juan Gralla	1498	1502	
Jaime de Albión	1506	1509	
Jerónimo de Cabanillas	1509	1511	
Louis of Praet	1525	1526	
Nicolas Perrenot de Granvelle	1526	1528	
Louis of Praet	1529	1530	2nd term
François de Bonvalot, Abbot of Saint Vincent de Besançon	1532	1534	
Jean Hannaert, Viscount of Lombeek	1534	1536	
Cornelis de Schepper	1536	1538	
François de Bonvalot, Abbot of Saint Vincent de Besançon	1539	1540	2nd term
Jean de Saint-Mauris, Sieur of Montbarrey	1544	1549	
Simon Renard, Sieur of Bermont	1549	1552	
Nicholas Wotton	1553	1557	
Thomas Perrenot de Granvelle	1559	1564	
Francisco de Álava y Beamonte	1564	1571	
Enrique de Guzmán, 2nd Count of Olivares	January 1571		
Diego de Zúñiga y Benavides (es)	1572	1576	
Juan de Vargas Mejía	1577	1580	
Juan Bautista de Tassis Wachtendonk (nl)	January 1581	December 1584	
Bernardino de Mendoza	November 1584	1590	
Lorenzo IV Suárez de Figueroa y Córdoba, duque de Feria	1593	1595	
Franco-Spanish War	1595	1598	
Juan Bautista de Tassis Wachtendonk (2nd term)	1598	1604	
Baltasar de Zúñiga	1603	1607	
Pedro de Toledo Osorio	1608	1608	Ambassador extraordinary
Íñigo de Cárdenas y Zapata	1609	1615	
Héctor de Pignatelli y Colonna	1615	1618	
Fernando Girón de Salcedo	1618	1620	
Antonio Dávila y Zúñiga, Marqués de Mirabel (es)	1621	1630	
Cristóbal de Benavente y Benavides	1632	1635	
Franco-Spanish War	1635	1659	
Alfonso Pérez de Vivero, 3rd Count of Fuensaldaña	1660	1661	
Gaspar de Teves y Tello de Guzmán, I Marqués de la Fuente de Torno (fr)	1661	1667	
War of Devolution	1667	1668	
Antonio de Tovar y Paz, Conde de Molina (1st term)	1668	1670	
Francisco Gutiérrez de los Ríos	1670	1670	
Antonio de Tovar y Paz, Conde de Molina (2nd term)	1672	1673	
Franco-Dutch War	1673	1678	
Paolo Spinola, 3rd Marquis of Los Balbases	1678	1679	
Domenico del Giudice e Palagno, 2nd Duke of Giovenazzo	1679	1680	
Gaspar de Teves y Córdoba y Tello de Guzmán, II Marqués de la Fuente de Torno	1680	1683	
War of the Reunions	1683	1684	
Nine Years' War	1688	1697	
Manuel de Oms y de Santa Pau, Marquess of Castelldosrius	1698	1703	
Antonio Álvarez de Toledo y Guzmán, IX Duke of Alba	1703	1711	
Félix Cornejo y Alemán	1711	1715	
Antonio del Giudice, 3rd Duke of Giovinazzo	1715	1719	
Patrick Lawless	1720	1725	
Álvaro de Navia-Osorio y Vigil	1727	1730	
Lucas de Spínola y Spínola	1730	1730	
Baltasar Patiño y Rosales, marqués de Castelar	1730	1733	
Fernando Triviño Figueroa y Alarcón	1733	1736	
Jaime de Guzmán-Dávalos y Spínola, marqués de la Mina	1736	1740	
Luis Reggio Branciforte y Colonna, príncipe de Campoflorido	1740	1746	
Fernando de Silva y Álvarez de Toledo, Duke of Huéscar	8 August 1746	1749	
Francisco Pignatelli	1749	1751	
Jaime Masones de Lima y Sotomayor, conde de Montalvo	1752	1761	
Jerónimo Grimaldi	1761	1763	
Joaquín Atanasio Pignatelli de Aragón Fernández de Heredia y Moncayo, conde de Fuentes	1764	1772	
Pedro Pablo Abarca de Bolea, Conde de Aranda	1773	1787	
Carlos José Gutiérrez de los Ríos, conde de Fernán Núñez	1787	1791	
Domingo d'Yriarte	1791	1792	
War of the Pyrenees	1793	1795	
Bernardo del Campo	1795	1798	
François Cabarrus	1797	1798	
José Nicolás de Azara, I marqués de Nibiano	March 1798	November 1803	
Federico Gravina	1804	1805	
Eugenio Izquierdo	1805	1808	
Peninsular War	1808	1814	
Diego Fernández de Velasco, 13th Duke of Frías	1808	1811	For King Joseph I of Spain
Manuel Negrete de la Torre	1811	1814	For King Joseph I of Spain
José Miguel de Carvajal-Vargas, 2nd Duke of San Carlos	1815	1815	
Antonio María Dameto y Crespí de Valldaura, conde de Perelada	1815	1817	
Carlos Gutiérrez de los Ríos	1817	1820	
José Gabriel de Silva-Bazán, 10th Marquess of Santa Cruz	1820	1821	
Carlos Martínez de Irujo y Tacón, I Marquess of Casa Irujo	1821	1823	
José Miguel de Carvajal-Vargas, 2nd Duke of San Carlos	1823	1823	2nd term
Conde de la Puebla del Maestre	1824	1825	
José Antonio Azlor de Aragón Pignatelli	1825	1827	
José Miguel de Carvajal-Vargas, 2nd Duke of San Carlos	1827	1828	3rd term
Narciso Heredia, Count of Ofalia	1830	1832	
Bernardino Fernández de Velasco, 14th Duke of Frías	1834	1835	
Miguel Ricardo de Álava y Esquivel	1835	1836	
Joaquín Francisco Campuzano	6 September 1836	12 January 1838	
Luis del Águila y Alvarado, marqués de Espeja	1838	1838	
Manuel de Pando y Fernández de Pinedo, marqués de Miraflores	1838	1840	
Salustiano Olózaga	1840	1843	
Francisco Martínez de la Rosa	1843	1847	
Ramón María Narváez, 1st Duke of Valencia	1847	1848	
Carlos Martínez de Irujo y McKean, duque de Sotomayor	1848	1851	
Juan Donoso Cortés	1851	1853	
Mariano Téllez-Girón, 12th Duke of Osuna	1853	1853	
Manuel de la Pezuela, 2nd Marquess of Viluma	1853	1854	
Salustiano Olózaga (2nd term)	1854	1856	
Francisco Antonio Eduvigis Dolores Serrano y Domínguez, Duke of la Torre	1856	1857	
Ángel de Saavedra y Ramírez de Baquedano, duque de Rivas	1857	1858	
Alejandro Mon y Menéndez (1st term)	1858	1862	
José Gutiérrez de la Concha, 1st Marquis of Havana	1862	1863	
Francisco Javier de Istúriz	1863	1864	
Salvador Bermúdez de Castro y Díez, marqués de Lema	1865	1866	
Alejandro Mon y Menéndez (2nd term)	1866	1868	
Salustiano Olózaga (3rd term)	1870	1873	
Buenaventura de Abarzuza y Ferrer	1873	1874	
Antonio Aguilar y Correa, Marquis of Vega de Armijo	1874	1875	
Mariano Roca de Togores y Carrasco, marqués de Molins	1875	1881	
Manuel Silvela	1884	1885	
Francisco de Cárdenas Espejo	February 1885	December 1885	
José Luis Albareda y Sezde	15 January 1886	12 November 1887	
Fernando León y Castillo	12 November 1887	1890	
Fermín Lasala y Collado	1890	1892	
Fernando León y Castillo (2nd term)	1892	1897	
Fermín Lasala y Collado (2nd term)	1895	1897	
Fernando León y Castillo (3rd term)	1897	1910	
Juan Pérez-Caballero y Ferrer	1910	February 1913	
Wenceslao Ramírez de Villaurrutia	1913	September 1914	
Carlos Espinosa de los Monteros y Sagaseta de Ilurdoz, marqués de Valtierra	September 1914	19 December 1915	
Fernando León y Castillo (4th term)	19 December 1915	1917	
José María Quiñones de León	1917	December 1931	
Salvador de Madariaga y Rojo	January 1932	1933	
José María Aquinaga	1933	1934	
Juan Cárdenas y Rodríguez de Rivas	August 1934	April 1936	
Luis Araquistáin	November 1936		
Ángel Ossorio y Gallardo	October 1937	February 1938	
Marcelino Pascua	March 1938	1939	
José Félix de Lequerica	1939	1944	Fernando Carderera. Junio 2017
José Antonio de Sangróniz y Castro	1944	1945	
Miguel Mateu y Pla	1945	1947	
Manuel Aguirre de Cárcer	16 February 1951	18 April 1952	
José Rojas y Moreno, conde de Casa Rojas		25 January 1960	
José María de Areilza y Martínez de Rodas, conde de Motrico	7 July 1960	28 October 1964	
Carlos de Miranda y Quartín, 4th Count of Casa Miranda	29 October 1964	6 April 1966	
Pedro Cortina Mauri	7 April 1966	3 January 1974	
Miguel María de Lojendio Irure	19 March 1974	9 August 1976	
Francisco Javier Elorza y Echániz, Marquess consort of Nerva	10 August 1976	22 June 1978	
Miguel Solano Aza	23 June 1978	13 April 1983	
Joan Raventós Carner	13 April 1983	2 May 1986	
Juan Durán-Loriga Rodrigáñez	31 May 1986	15 February 1991	
Gabriel Ferrán de Alfaro	15 February 1991	3 June 1994	
Máximo Cajal López	10 June 1994	8 July 1996	
Carlos Manuel de Benavides y Salas	10 July 1996	23 July 2000	
Francisco Javier Elorza y Cavengt, 4th Marquess of Nerva	24 July 2000	26 July 2004	
Francisco Villar y Ortiz de Urbina	27 July 2004	8 August 2010	
Carlos Bastarreche	11 October 2010	22 June 2014	
Ramón de Miguel y Egea	23 June 2014	3 May 2017	
Fernando Carderera Soler	24 June 2017	2020	
José Manuel Albares Bueno	4 February 2020	12 July 2021	
Victorio Redondo Baldrich	29 September 2021		

== See also ==
- France–Spain relations
- Pacte de Famille
- List of Ambassadors of France to Spain
