= Gabriel Ferrán de Alfaro =

Spanish diplomat (born 1932)

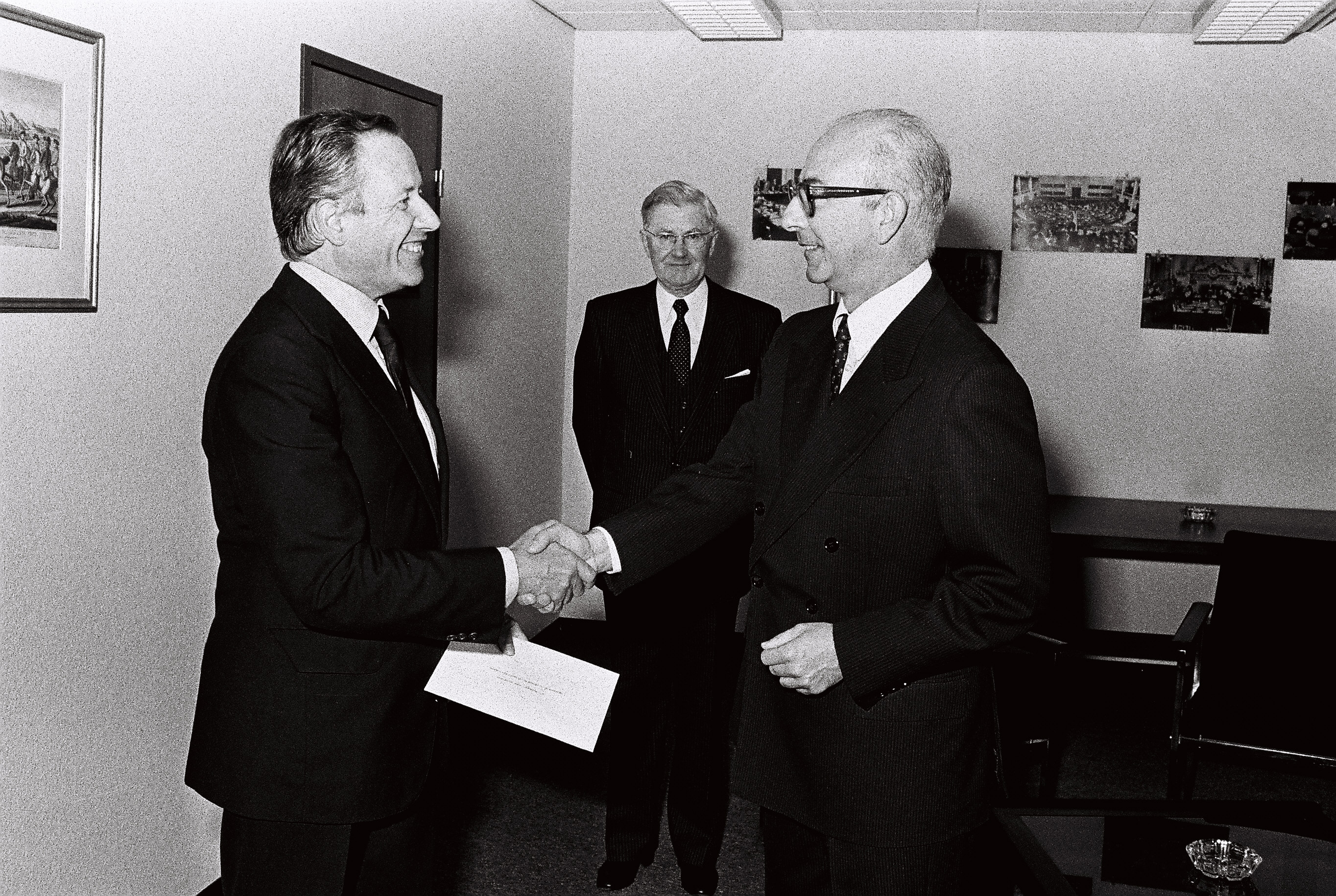
- Ambassador Ferrán (right) presenting credetials to Gaston Thorn

Ambassador of Spain to Morocco
- In office June 4, 1994 – June 17, 1997
- Preceded by: Joaquín Ortega Salinas
- Succeeded by: Jorge Dezcallar de Mazarredo

Ambassador of Spain to France
- In office February 20, 1991 – June 4, 1994
- Preceded by: Juan Durán-Loriga Rodrigáñez
- Succeeded by: Máximo Cajal López

Ambassador Head of Mission of Spain to the European Communities
- In office June 12, 1981 – November 28, 1985
- Preceded by: Raimundo Bassols
- Succeeded by: Carlos Westendorp
Other posts
Ambassador of Spain to Portugal
In office November 28, 1985 – February 20, 1991
Preceded by	Ramón Fernández de Soignie
Succeeded by	José Joaquín Puig de la Bellacasa
Secretary-General for Relations with the European Communities
In office September 29, 1980 – June 12, 1981
Preceded by	Matías Rodríguez Inciarte
Succeeded by	Carlos Westendorp

Personal details
- Born: 5 June 1932 (age 93) Teruel, Spain
- Occupation: Diplomat

Gabriel Ferrán de Alfaro (born 5 June 1932) is a Spanish diplomat.

== Life and career ==
Ferrán de Alfaro was born in Teruel, Spain, on 5 June 1932. After holding various positions, since 1971 he specialized in european affairs.

During the Spanish transition to democracy, in 1978, Ferrán de Alfaro was appointed Technical Secretary for Relations with the European Communities —with the rank of director-general— and, in 1980, he was promoted to Secretary-General for Relations with the European Communities —with the rank of under-secretary—, both positions within the Ministry of the Presidency.

During the 1981 Spanish coup attempt, when the government and parliament was taken hostage, Ferrán was a member of the General Commission of Secretaries of State and Undersecretaries. This Commission was ordered by King Juan Carlos I to act as a caretaker government to ensure institutional continuity. In 2011, 30 years after the coup attempt, the government awarded the Commission's members with the Order of Constitutional Merit for their loyalty.

After Raimundo Bassols' appointment as secretary of state for the European Communities, Ferrán de Alfaro was sent to Brussels. As ambassador to the European Communities, he was the fourth person to sign in Spain's name the Accession Treaty of Spain to the European Economic Community, after Felipe González —prime minister—, Fernando Morán —foreign minister— and Manuel Marín —secretary of state—.

In 1985 he moved from Brussels to Lisbon, as he was appointed ambassador to Portugal. After serving for almost six years, in early 1991 he was appointed ambassador to France. From 1994 to 1997, he served as ambassador of Spain to Morocco, the last appointment before retirement.

In 2002 he was awarded with the Grand Cross of the Order of Isabella the Catholic.

== Personal life ==
Ferrán de Alfaro married María Dolores Carrión. They have three children: Gabriel, Inmaculada and Isabel.

His eldest son, Gabriel, also a diplomat, was ambassador of Spain to Afghanistan when the country's capital fell into Taliban hands. Despite having been dismissed ten days before the fall of the Afghan government, Gabriel decided to stay until the evacuation was completed and no Spaniards remained in Afghanistan. Finally, both the ambassador and the deputy ambassador returned to Spain on August 27th. He was later rewarded with the Cross of the Order of Police Merit, with White Decoration.
