= List of ambassadors of Spain to Algeria =

Ambassador of Spain to Algeria
- Coat of arms of Spain
- Incumbent; Ramiro Fernández Bachiller since 4 December 2025
- Ministry of Foreign Affairs; Secretariat of State for Foreign Affairs
- Style: The Most Excellent
- Residence: Algiers
- Nominator: The Foreign Minister
- Appointer: The Monarch
- Term length: At the government's pleasure
- Inaugural holder: José Felipe de Alcover y Sureda
- Formation: 1962
- Website: Mission of Spain to Algeria

The ambassador of Spain to Algeria is the official representative of the Kingdom of Spain to the People's Democratic Republic of Algeria. Spain has two consulates general in Algeria, one in Algiers and another in Oran.

Spain has kept diplomatic relations with the rulers of the cities of Béjaïa and Algiers since the 15th century. Later, with the establishment of the Regency of Algiers, Spain sent numerous envoys to the court of Barbarossa and to his successors. After the Spanish–Algerian War (1775–1785), both sides signed a peace and trade treaty, allowing the establishment of a permanent consulate in the country, which has remained in operation ever since. Mothern diplomatic relations were established during the dictatorship of Francisco Franco, establishing a permanent embassy in Algiers in 1962.

== List of diplomats to Algeria ==
Until the year 2000, the work "History of the Spanish Diplomacy" by diplomat and historian Miguel Ángel Ochoa Brun was used as a source. From the year 2000 onwards, appointments are sourced from publication in the Official State Gazette.

Nombre		Cargo	Periodo
Martín Vençon		Emissary (to Béjaïa)	1493
Juan Pont		Ambassador	1493
Gisbert de Santa Fe		Emissary (to Béjaïa and Algiers)	1496
Enríquez		Envoy (to Béjaïa)	1510
Antonio de Rabaneda		Envoy (to Béjaïa)	1511
Juan de Presende		Envoy (to Barbarossa)	1534
Sancho Muñoz de Villanueva		Envoy (to Barbarossa)	1537
Alonso de Alarcón		Envoy (to Barbarossa)	1537–1539
Juan Gallego		Envoy (to Barbarossa)	1538
Juanote Pujades		Envoy (to the Bey of Algiers)	1540
Juan de Vergara		Envoy (to Barbarossa)	1541
Juan de Aragón		Envoy (to Barbarossa)	1541
Chapón		Envoy (to Barbarossa)	1543 y 1544
Fray Mateo de Aguirre		Ambassador (to the Kingdom of Kuku)	1602–1603
P. José Conde		Agent	1775–1782
Gerardo José de Souza y Betancourt		Agent	1779–1783
Jose de Mazarredo y Salazar		Plenipotentiary	1785
Louis-Alexandre Expilly de la Poipe		Plenipotentiary	1785
Manuel de las Heras		Consul General	1786
Pedro Suchita		Agent	1786
Louis-Alexandre Expilly de la Poipe		Plenipotentiary	1787
Francisco de Montengón		Chancellor and Chargé d'affaires	1791
Manuel de Asprer y Janer		Consul General and Chargé d'affaires	1792–1793
Miguel de Larrea y Salcedo		Consul General and Chargé d'affaires	1793–1800
José Joaquín de Ceraín		Vice Consul and Chargé d'affaires	1800–1802
Pedro Ortiz de Zugasti Tallavía de Aragón		Chargé d'affaires	1802–1803
José Alonso Ortiz		Chargé d'affaires	1803–1808
Rosendo José Gutiérrez		Consul General and Chargé d'affaires	1809
Pedro Ortiz de Zugasti Tallavía de Aragón		Chargé d'affaires	1809–1830
José María del Castillo		Consul General and Chargé d'affaires	1826–1833
The Consul General in Algiers from 1833 to 1962
Manuel Viturro y Somoza		Chargé d'affaires	1962
1	José Felipe de Alcover y Sureda	Ambassador	1962–1964
2	José Luis Los Arcos y Elío	Ambassador	1964–1970
3	Carlos Iniesta Cano	Ambassador	1970–1972
4	José Ramón Sobredo Rioboo	Ambassador	1972–1976
5	Gabriel Mañueco de Lecea	Ambassador	1976–1978
6	José María Ullrich Rojas	Ambassador	1978–1982
7	Eduardo de Zulueta y Dato	Ambassador	1982–1985
8	Gumersindo Rico Rodríguez-Villar	Ambassador	1986–1990
9	Francisco Javier Conde de Saro	Ambassador	1990–1994
10	Francisco Javier Jiménez-Ugarte Hernández	Ambassador	1994–1996
11	Ricardo Zalacaín Jorge	Ambassador	1996–2000
12	Emilio Fernández-Castaño y Díaz-Caneja	Ambassador	2001–2004
13	Juan Bautista Leña Casas	Ambassador	2004–2008
14	Gabriel Busquets Aparicio	Ambassador	2008–2013
15	Alejandro Polanco Mata	Ambassador	2013–2017
16	Santiago Cabanas Ansorena	Ambassador	2017–2018
17	Fernando Morán Calvo-Sotelo	Ambassador	2018–2025
18	Ramiro Fernández Bachiller	Ambassador	2025–present

== See also ==
- Algeria–Spain relations
