= Raimundo Bassols =

Spanish diplomat

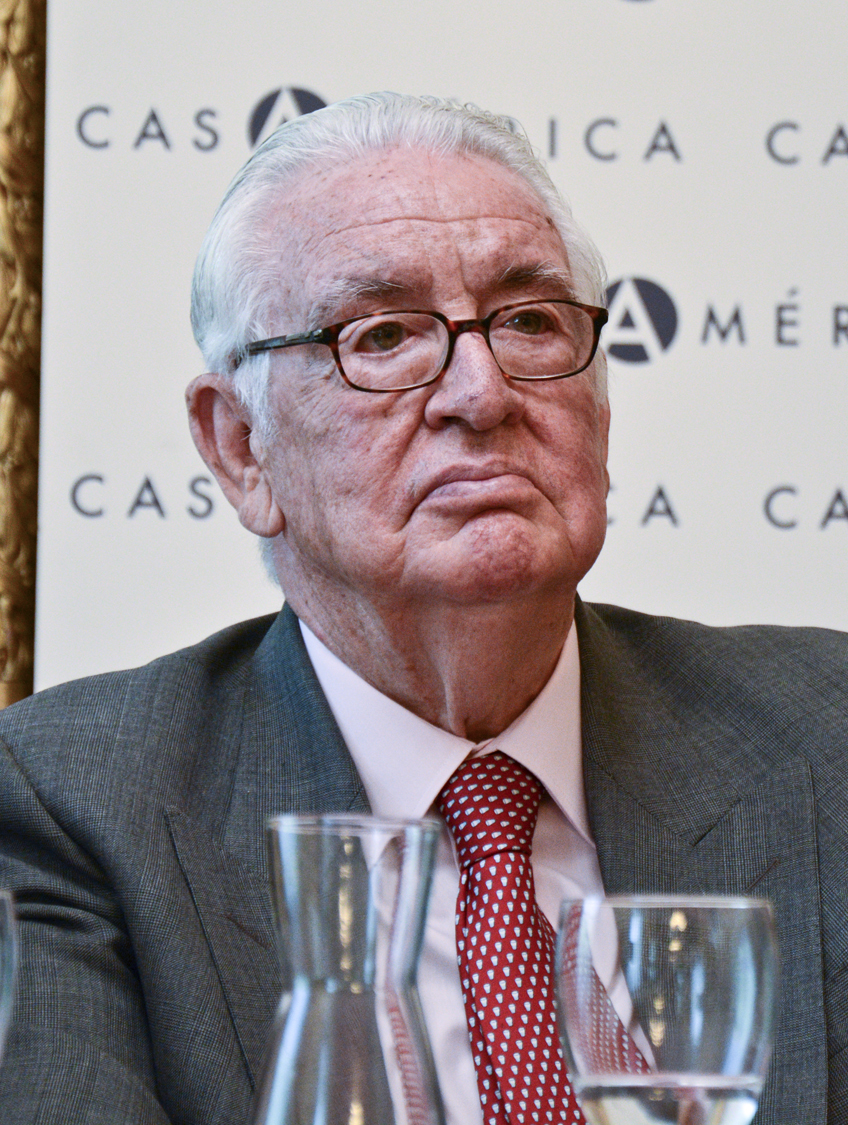
- Raimundo Bassols in 2013

Secretary of State for the European Communities
- In office February 28, 1981 – December 8, 1982
- Preceded by: Office established
- Succeeded by: Manuel Marín

Ambassador Head of Mission of Spain to the European Communities
- In office November 13, 1976 – February 28, 1981
- Preceded by: Alberto Ullastres
- Succeeded by: Gabriel Ferrán de Alfaro
Other posts
Ambassador of Spain to Argentina
In office December 23, 1986 – April 3, 1991
Preceded by	José Luis Messía Jiménez
Succeeded by	Rafael Pastor Ridruejo
Ambassador of Spain to Morocco
In office February 21, 1983 – December 23, 1986
Preceded by	Alfonso de la Serna y Gutiérrez-Répide
Succeeded by	Joaquín Ortega Salinas
Director-General for International Economic Relations
In office April 3, 1974 – November 13, 1976
Preceded by	José Luis Cerón Ayuso
Succeeded by	Carlos Gámir Prieto

Personal details
- Born: April 3, 1926 (age 100) Barcelona, Spain
- Education: University of Barcelona; University of Bologna
- Occupation: Diplomat

Raimundo Bassols Jacas (born April 3, 1926) is a Spanish diplomat.

== Biography ==
Bassols was born in Barcelona in 1926. He attended the University of Barcelona, graduating in law. Later, he got a PhD in law by the University of Bologna.

In 1954 he joined the diplomatic corps. After serving in several positions within the Ministry of Foreign Affairs, in 1974 he was appointed director-general for International Economic Relations, serving as such until 1976, when he was posted in Brussels as Ambassador Head of Mission of Spain to the European Communities, replacing Alberto Ullastres. Five years later, in 1981, he was called back to Spain to serve as the first Secretary of State for the European Communities.

In early 1983, he was appointed ambassador to Morocco, presenting his diplomatic credentials to King Hassan II in June 2. He was dismissed in late 1986 and posted in Buenos Aires, serving as ambassador to Argentina until his retirement in 1991, at the age of 65.

=== Honours ===
During his diplomatic career, he was rewarded with the Grand Cross of the Order of Isabella the Catholic (1982) and the Grand Cross of Military Merit, with White Decoration (1987).
