= Fernando León y Castillo =

Spanish politician and diplomat

Fernando León y Castillo 1st Marquess of Muni
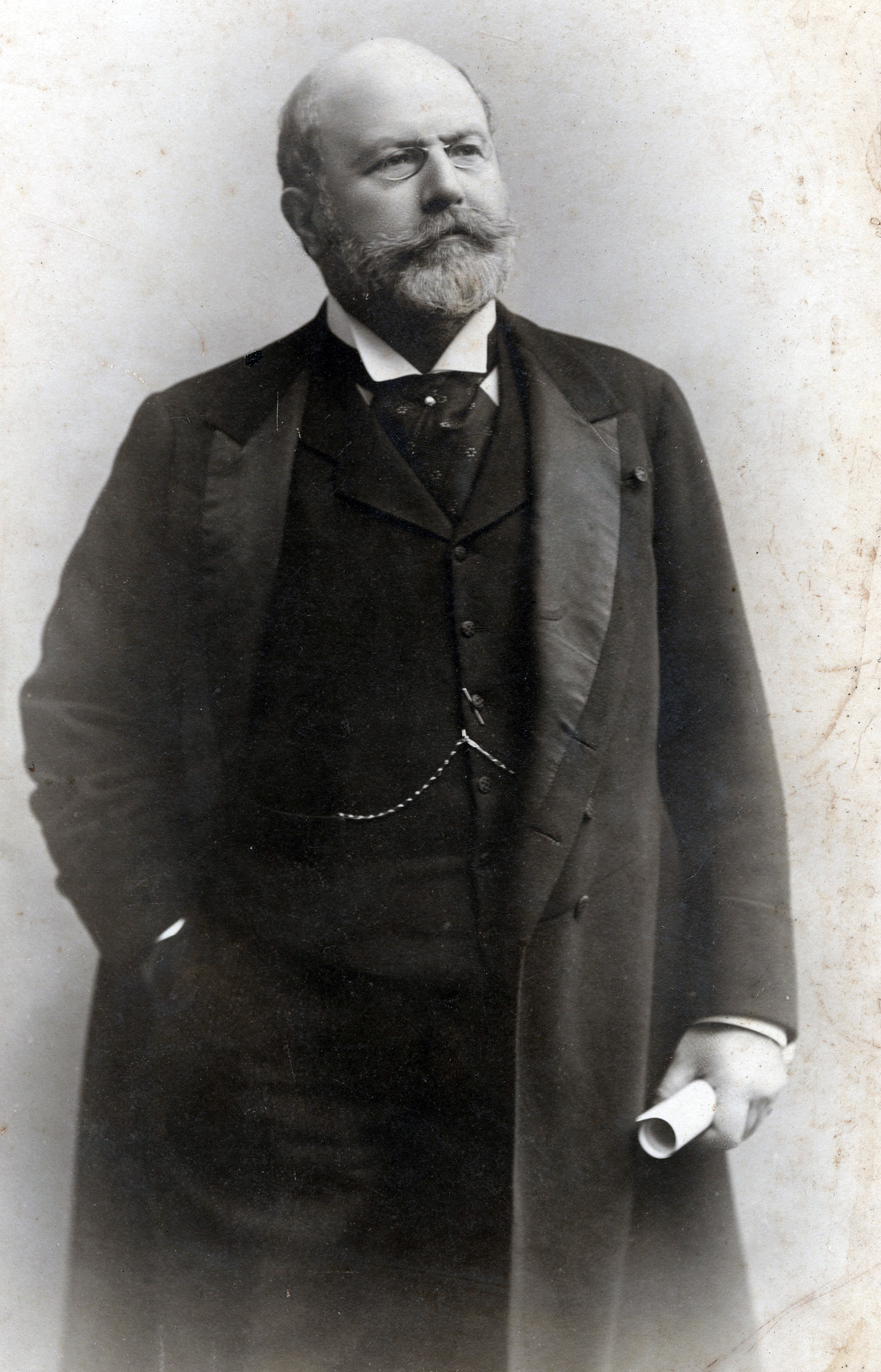

Ambassador of Spain to France
- In office 1887–1918

Minister of Overseas of Spain
- In office 8 February 1881 – 9 October 1883
- Monarch: Alfonso XII
- Prime Minister: Práxedes Mateo Sagasta
- Preceded by: Cayetano Sánchez Bustillo
- Succeeded by: Gaspar Núñez de Arce

Minister of Governance of Spain
- In office 10 October 1886 – 12 November 1887
- Monarch: Alfonso XIII
- Regent: Maria Christina of Austria
- Prime Minister: Práxedes Mateo Sagasta
- Preceded by: Venancio González y Fernández
- Succeeded by: José Luis Albareda y Sezde

Personal details
- Born: November 30, 1842 Telde, Spain
- Died: March 12, 1918 (aged 75) Biarritz, France
- Party: Liberal Party

Fernando León y Castillo, 1st Marquess of Muni (30 November 1842 – 12 March 1918) was a Spanish politician and diplomat, he decided on an intervention of Spain and North Africa.

He went to Madrid and collaborated in liberal publications in the late years of the reign of Isabella II. From the Revolution of 1868, he was nominated a governor of Granada and Valencia.

He was successively elected deputy and senator for the province of the Canary Islands, and in 1874 he was named the overseas sub-secretary.

During the government of Práxedes Mateo Sagasta, he served as minister of overseas (1881–1883) and minister of the interior (1886–1887). In 1887, he was appointed ambassador to France until 1918. In 1900 he created Marquess of Muni for negotiating with France over the Spanish Guinea (present-day Equatorial Guinea) in the Treaty of Paris.

He participated in the Algeciras Conference in 1906
