= Francisco Javier Conde de Saro =

Spanish diplomat

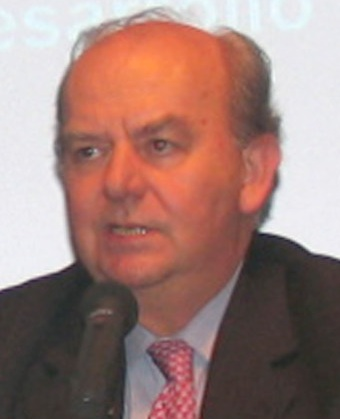
- Conde de Saro in 2005

Ambassador of Spain to Japan
- In office September 21, 2002 – January 21, 2006
- Preceded by: Juan Bautista Leña Casas
- Succeeded by: Miguel Ángel Carriedo Mompín

Ambassador Permanent Representative of Spain to the European Union
- In office June 24, 2000 – September 7, 2002
- Preceded by: The Marquess of Nerva
- Succeeded by: Carlos Bastarreche

Ambassador Permanent Representative of Spain to the North Atlantic Council
- In office June 8, 1996 – June 3, 2000
- Preceded by: The Count of Casa Miranda
- Succeeded by: Juan Prat y Coll
Other posts
Secretary-General for European Communities
In office July 27, 1994 – May 21, 1996
Preceded by	The Marquess of Nerva
Succeeded by	Carlos Bastarreche
Ambassador of Spain to Algeria
In office September 11, 1990 – May 7, 1994
Preceded by	Gumersindo Rico Rodríguez
Succeeded by	Francisco Javier Jiménez-Ugarte Hernández
Director-General for European Legal and Institutional Coordination
In office November 5, 1986 – January 20, 1990
Preceded by	Fernando Mansito Caballero
Succeeded by	Carlos Bastarreche

Personal details
- Born: March 13, 1946 (age 79) Madrid, Spain

Francisco Javier Conde de Saro (born March 13, 1946) is a Spanish diplomat.

== Biography ==
Conde de Saro was born in Madrid. He graduated in law and joined the diplomatic career in 1971.

In August 1976 he was appointed deputy director-general for international fisheries relations at the Ministry of Trade. He was dismissed at the end of 1977. He subsequently served as advisor to the minister of transport and communications and has been posted to the Spanish diplomatic missions in Morocco and Argentina.

In 1986, already in the central services of the Ministry of Foreign Affairs, he was appointed director-general for European Legal and Institutional Coordination and, in 1990, chief of staff to the Secretary of State for the European Communities, at that time the socialist Pedro Solbes. Eight months later, he received his first head of mission, being appointed Spanish ambassador to Algeria.

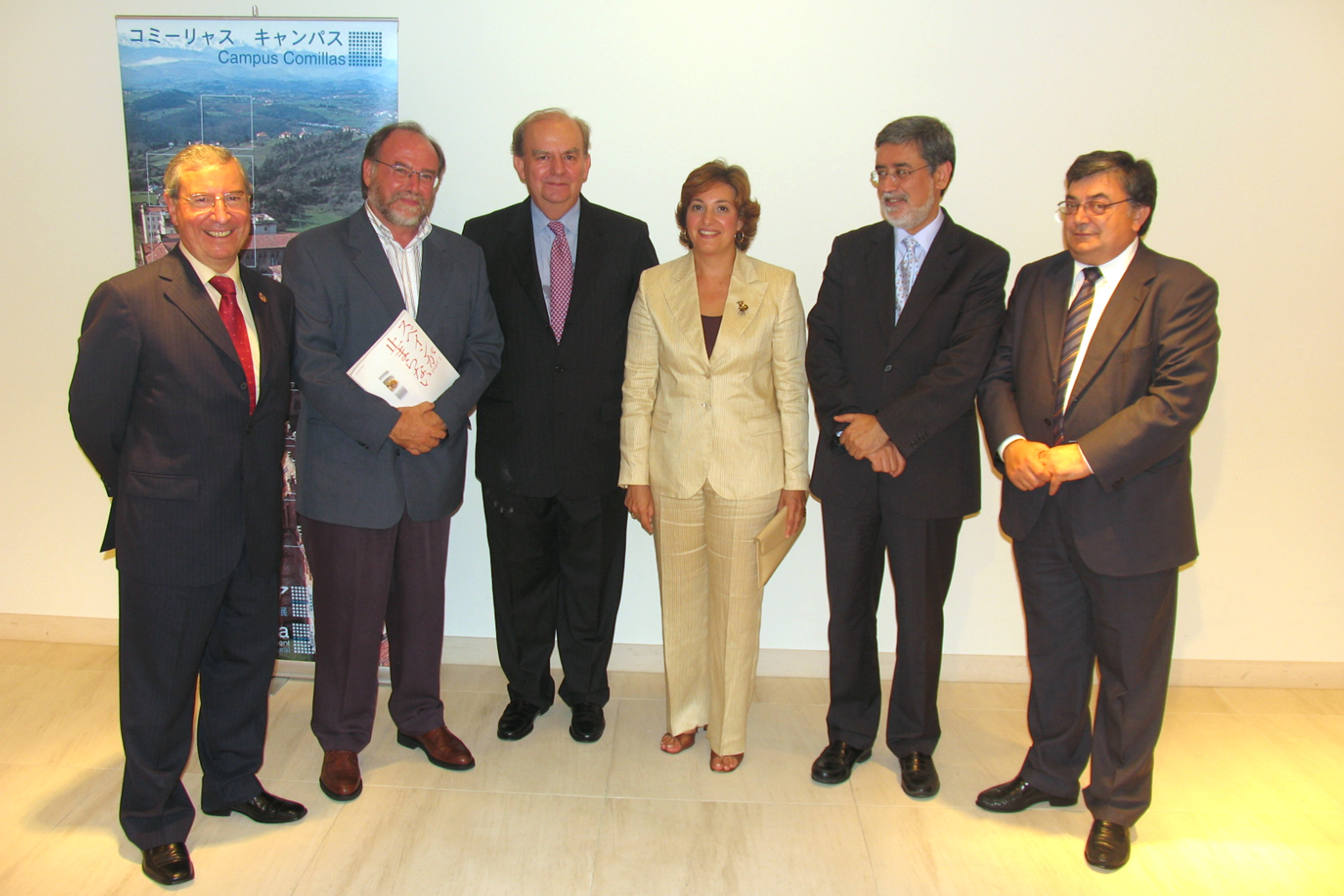
The ambassador (center left) with Cantabrian authorities during a reception at the Spanish Embassy in Japan. 2005

After almost four years in the Arab country, he was called to Madrid to take over the position of Secretary-General for the European Communities, receiving at this time the Grand Cross of Naval Merit, with White Decoration. He held this position until the change of government in May 1996, when he was appointed ambassador permanent representative of Spain to the North Atlantic Council (NATO) and he rewarded for his services with the Grand Cross of Aeronautical Merit, with White Decoration.

Between 2000 and 2002 he represented Spanish interests before the European Union, being decorated after his dismissal with the Grand Cross of the Order of Isabella the Catholic.

He was immediately sent to Tokyo to replace diplomat Juan Bautista Leña Casas as head of the embassy and in 2006 he was entrusted with the task of directing the State Society for International Exhibitions, a state-owned enterprise. From this position he coordinated the Spanish presence in various important events such as the Expo 2008 —for which he was named honorary ambassador of the city of Zaragoza— or the Expo 2010, not being able to enjoy the latter since he was dismissed weeks before its inauguration.
