= Pedro Morenés =

Spanish politician

The Most Excellent Pedro Morenés
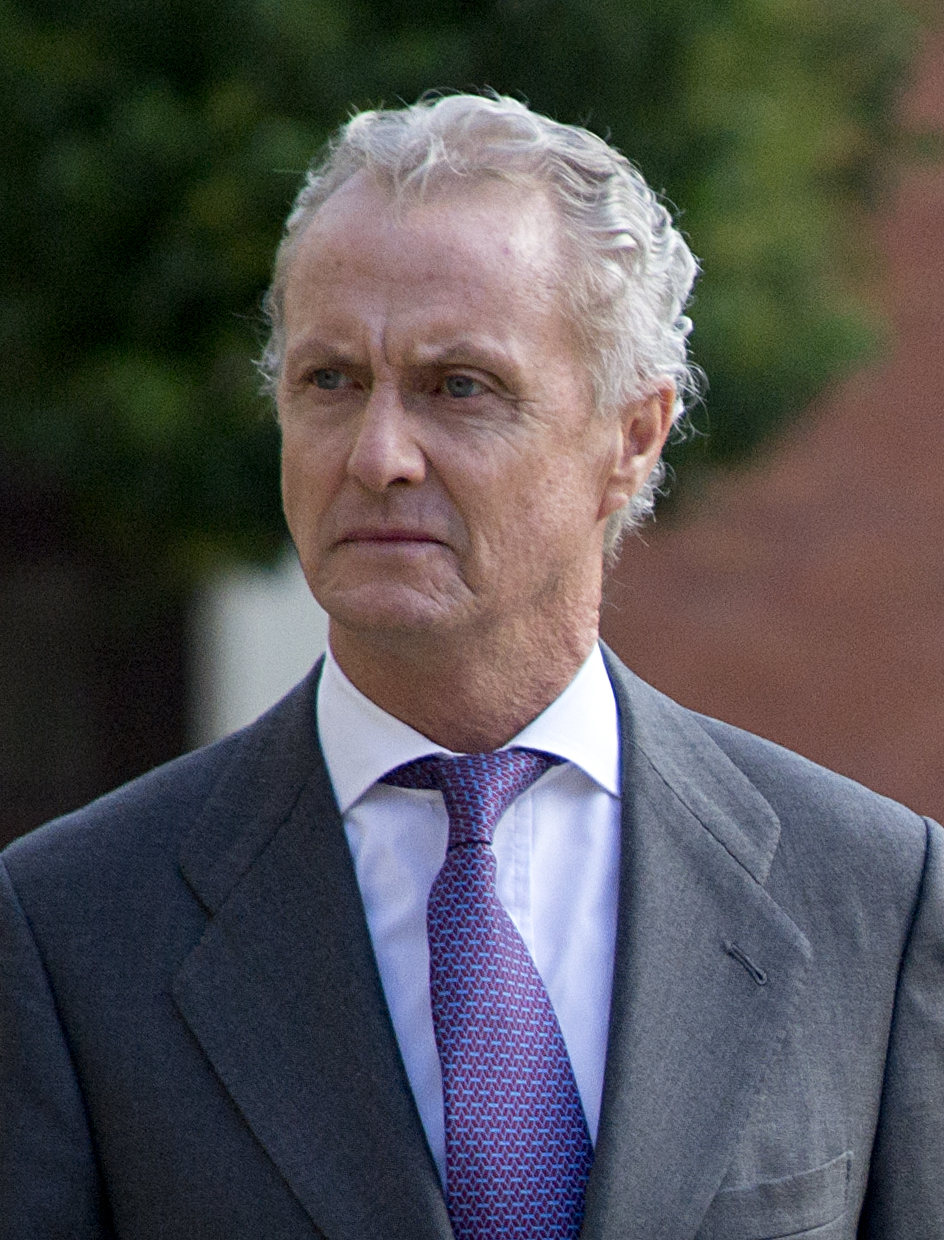
- Morenés in September 2012

Ambassador of Spain to the United States
- In office 25 March 2017 – 8 September 2018
- Preceded by: Ramón Gil-Casares
- Succeeded by: Santiago Cabanas Ansorena

Minister of Defense
- In office 22 December 2011 – 4 November 2016
- Monarchs: Juan Carlos I Felipe VI
- Prime Minister: Mariano Rajoy
- Preceded by: Carme Chacón
- Succeeded by: María Dolores de Cospedal

Personal details
- Born: 17 September 1948 (age 78) Las Arenas, Spain
- Party: Independent
- Spouse: Goretti Escauriaza Barreiro
- Children: 3
- Education: University of Navarra; University of Deusto; Bremen Institute of Shipping Economics
- Occupation: Lawyer, professor

Pedro Morenés y Álvarez de Eulate (born 17 September 1948) is a Spanish politician who was minister of defence and Ambassador of Spain to the United States of America. Prior to his appointment as minister, he was president of Real Club de la Puerta de Hierro, from 2006 to 2011.

== Early life and education ==
Morenés was born in Las Arenas, province of Vizcaya, on 17 September 1948. He is the second son of José María de Morenés y Carvajal, 4th Viscount of Alesón (son of the Count and Countess of the Asalto, Grandees of Spain) and Ana Sofía Álvarez de Eulate y Mac-Mahón. He studied law at the University of Navarra and business administration at the University of Deusto. He obtained a master's degree in ship management and economics at the Bremen Institute of Shipping Economics.

== Career ==
Morenés began his career as lawyer in 1979. After working private law firms, he became the head of the Legal Services branch of the Shipbuilding Division in the National Industry Institute (INI) in 1991. He also became a professor of vessel chartering and shipping freight in the Spanish Maritime Institute of Madrid and in the European Institute for Maritime Studies. In 1994, he was named as the managing director of the commercial branch of the Shipbuilding Division in the National Industry Institute (INI) and member of its steering committee. Next, he was appointed Secretary of State for Defence in the Ministry of Defence in May 1996. Four years later, in May 2000, he was appointed Secretary of State for Security in the Ministry of the Interior. His tenure lasted two years, and in August 2002, he became Secretary of State for Scientific and Technological Policy in the Ministry of Science and Technology. His tenure lasted until March 2005. He served as the secretary general of the Businessmen Association from March 2005 to June 2010. In January 2009, he was also appointed chairman of the Board of Directors of Construcciones Navales del Norte, and served there until January 2011. Then he began to serve as the chairman of MBDA Spain, a missile systems firm, in June 2010 and of Segur Ibérica, a private security firm, in January 2011. His tenure lasted until December 2011. He was appointed Defence Minister on 21 December 2011.

Morenés labelled the mission in Afghanistan as war, breaking a taboo in 2012.

== Honours ==
- Spain :
  - Knight of the Royal Cavalry Armory of Zaragoza (14/11/1966).
  - Knight Grand Cross of the Royal Order of Isabella the Catholic (07/05/2004).
  - Knight Grand Cross of the Order of Charles III (28/12/2021).

== Ancestry ==
Ancestors of Pedro Morenés

16. Antonio de Morenés, 3rd Baron of the Cuatro Torres
8. Carlos de Morenés, 4th Baron of the Cuatro Torres
17. Antonia de Tord y Crell
4. Ramón de Morenés, 8th Count of the Asalto
18. Carlos García-Alesón, 6th Count of the Asalto
9. María Fernanda García-Alesón, 7th Countess of the Asalto
19. María Dolores Pardo-Rivadeneyra y Ruiz de Trocóniz
2. José María de Morenés, 4th Viscount of Alesón
20. Ángel María de Carvajal, 8th Duke of Abrantes
10. Vicente de Carvajal, 16th Marquess of Aguilafuente
21. María Manuela Téllez-Girón y Pimentel
5. María Inmaculada de Carvajal y Hurtado de Mendoza
22. Esteban Hurtado de Mendoza, 7th Lord of Jausoro
11. Ramona Hurtado de Mendoza y Ruiz de Otazu
23. María Manuela Ruiz de Otazu y Balencegui
1. Pedro de Morenés y Álvarez de Eulate
24. Rafael Álvarez de Eulate y Acedo
12. Vicente Álvarez de Eulate y Moreda
25. María Josefa de Moreda y Murúa
6. Joaquín Álvarez de Eulate y de la Mata
26. Felipe de la Mata y Fernández de Arnedo
13. María Dolores de la Mata y Barrenechea
27. María Felipa de Barrenechea, 5th Countess of San Cristóbal
3. Ana Sofía Álvarez de Eulate y Mac-Mahón
28. Pedro Mac-Mahón y Jane
14. Pedro Mac-Mahón, 1st Marquess of Mac-Mahón
29. Josefa de Aguirre y Cucullu
7. Elena Mac-Mahón y Jacquet
30. Carlos Hipólito Jacquet
15. Sofía Micaela Jacquet y La Salle
31. Carolina Luisa de La Salle

Political offices
Preceded by Carme Chacón	Defence Minister of Spain; 2011–2016	Succeeded by María Dolores de Cospedal
