= Carlos Westendorp =

Spanish diplomat and politician (1937–2026)

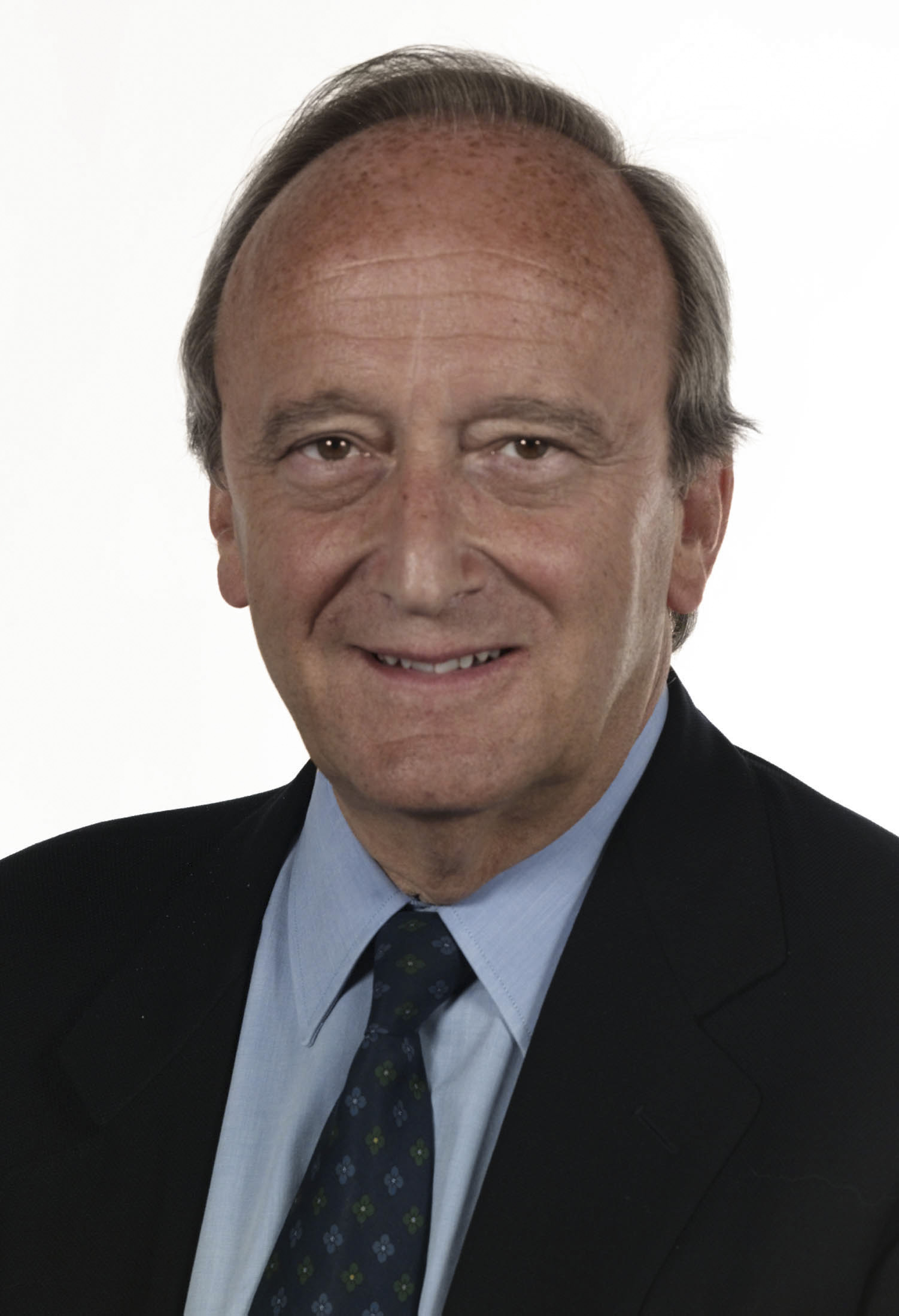
- Official portrait, 1999

High Representative for Bosnia and Herzegovina
- In office 18 June 1997 – 18 August 1999
- Preceded by: Carl Bildt
- Succeeded by: Wolfgang Petritsch

Minister of Foreign Affairs
- In office 18 December 1995 – 5 May 1996
- Prime Minister: Felipe González
- Preceded by: Javier Solana
- Succeeded by: Abel Matutes

Secretary of State for the European Union
- In office 16 March 1991 – 23 December 1995
- Preceded by: Pedro Solbes
- Succeeded by: Emilio Fernández-Castaño
Parliamentary offices
Member of the European Parliament
In office
20 July 1999 – 10 June 2003
Member of the Assembly of Madrid
In office
10 June 2003 – 12 August 2004
Diplomatic posts
Ambassador of Spain to the United States
In office 12 August 2004 – 21 August 2008
Preceded by	Javier Rupérez
Succeeded by	Jorge Dezcallar de Mazarredo
Ambassador Permanent Representative of Spain to the United Nations
In office 1 June 1996 – 28 June 1997
Preceded by	Juan Antonio Yáñez-Barnuevo
Succeeded by	Inocencio Arias
Ambassador Permanent Representative of Spain to the European Union
In office 31 December 1985 – 16 March 1991
Preceded by	Gabriel Ferrán de Alfaro (as Head of Mission)
Succeeded by	Camilo Barcia García-Villamil

Personal details
- Born: Carlos Westendorp y Cabeza; 7 January 1937 Madrid, Spain
- Died: 30 March 2026 (aged 89) Madrid, Spain
- Party: Spanish Socialist Workers' Party
- Spouse: Amaya de Miguel
- Children: 3

Carlos Westendorp y Cabeza (7 January 1937 – 30 March 2026) was a Spanish diplomat and politician who served as Minister of Foreign Affairs from 1995 to 1996. He also served as High Representative for Bosnia and Herzegovina, succeeding Carl Bildt and was tasked with upholding the Dayton Peace Agreement from 1997 to 1999.

== Early life and career ==
Born in Madrid on 7 January 1937, Westendorp joined the Spanish Diplomatic Service in 1966. Following several assignments abroad (from 1966 to 1969: Deputy Consul General in São Paulo, Brazil; from 1975 to 1979: Commercial and Economic Counselor at the Spanish Embassy in the Hague, the Netherlands) and in Spain (1969–1975: Head of Economic Studies at the Diplomatic School; Director of Technological Agreements in the Ministry of Foreign Affairs; Chief of Cabinet of the Minister of Industry,) he dedicated a great part of his professional career to the process of integration of Spain into the European Communities.

Between 1979 and 1985 at the Ministry of European Affairs, he successively served as Adviser to the Minister, as Head of the Minister’s Private Office and as Secretary-General, presiding over the technical team in charge of the accession negotiations. In 1986, when Spain joined the European Communities, he was appointed its first Ambassador Permanent Representative. He chaired the Committee of Permanent Representatives (COREPER) during the first Spanish Presidency of the EEC in 1989.

From 1991 to 1995 he was Spain’s Secretary of State for the European Union. He was centrally involved in the Spanish Presidency of the EU in 1995, which coincided with the adoption of the Euro, the launching of the Barcelona process, and the signing of the transatlantic agenda. In this last capacity, he chaired the Reflection group set up to prepare the negotiations on treaty change, which led to the Treaties of Amsterdam and, subsequently, Nice.

In December 1995, he was appointed Minister of Foreign Affairs and served in that capacity until the end of the last government presided by Felipe González. In May 1996 he was appointed Ambassador Permanent Representative of Spain to the United Nations in New York.

From 1997 to 1999 he served as the 2nd High Representative for Bosnia and Herzegovina. Under the so called "Bonn Powers" his role gave him the authority to take the necessary decisions to implement the Dayton Agreement. His first act with these new powers was laws on citizenship, and later imposed a new flag and national anthem. He was involved in removing Nikola Poplašen from power despite Poplašen having been elected president.

In 1999, Westendorp was elected a Member of the European Parliament representing the PSOE. He served as Chairman of the Parliament’s Committee on Industry, Trade, Energy and Research until 2003. In 2003, he was elected a Member of the Madrid Regional Assembly and the Speaker on Economy of the Socialist Group.

Westendorp was co-founder and executive vice-president of the Toledo Center for Peace and was subsequently a member of its board. After the elections of 2004, he was appointed Ambassador to the United States of America, a position he occupied until 2008. In April 2010, he was appointed Secretary-General of the Club de Madrid.

In his last years, Westendorp was the principal advisor to Felipe González, Chairman of the Reflection Group established by the EU Heads of State and Government to assist the European Union to anticipate and meet the challenges facing in the period 2020 to 2030 and president of Westendorp International S.L., a private consulting company.

== Death ==
Westendorp died in Madrid on 30 March 2026, at the age of 89.

== Awards ==
Westendorp addressed conferences and lectures, and wrote articles and books mostly on European Affairs, for which he was awarded the Salvador de Madariaga Prize of Journalism. He was awarded various Spanish and foreign decorations, including the Grand Cross of the Order of Charles III, the Grand Cross of the Order of Isabella the Catholic, and Officer of the Legion of Honour.

Political offices
Preceded by Javier Solana	Minister of Foreign Affairs; 18 December 1995 – 5 May 1996	Succeeded by Abel Matutes
Diplomatic posts
Preceded by Carl Bildt	High Representative for Bosnia and Herzegovina; 18 June 1997 – 17 August 1999	Succeeded by Wolfgang Petritsch
