= Algeria–Spain relations =

- Spain: Algeria

Diplomatic mission
- Embassy of Spain, Algiers: Embassy of Algeria, Madrid

The relations between the Kingdom of Spain and the People's Democratic Republic of Algeria, are not strained by a direct territorial dispute; there have been however discrepancies over the approach to the Western Sahara conflict.

Algeria and Spain are full members of the Union for the Mediterranean.

== History ==
=== Precedents ===
Much of the territories of current-day Spain and Algeria were part of polities such as the Roman Empire or the Arab Caliphates.

In the 16th century, the Hispanic Monarchy and the Ottoman Empire vied for hegemony in North Africa, including current-day Algeria. The former captured in 1510 the rock of Algiers and held it for a brief spell before being expelled by Hayreddin Barbarossa in 1529. The Zayyanid Kingdom of Tlemcen received protection from Charles V in exchange for parias, allowing the local ruler to remain in power until the 1555 Ottoman conquest.

The Spanish Monarchy exerted control of Oran (1509–1708; 1732–1792) and the neighbouring port of Mers El Kébir for much of the early modern period.

During much of the 18th century, the Spanish monarchy and the Regency of Algiers remained in conflict, which featured military campaigns and corsair operations. After an unsuccessful Spanish attack on Algier in 1775 seeking to force the regency to put an end for good to corsair operations against Christian fleets, the process of diplomatic negotiations began. Algiers posed as condition a wider Spanish-Ottoman peace, which was achieved in 1782. Likewise, Portugal entered the negotiations along with Spain. However internal divisions grew in the Regency in the face of the peace prospect, and the anti-peace positions in Algiers prevailed as the establishment of relations with Spain (and subsequent end of corsair operations) would pose a grave danger to the economy of the Regency. In this context, the 1783 and 1784 bombardments of Algiers took place. As it was suggested that Algerians were then amenable for dialogue, a third bombardment in 1785 was narrowly cancelled, and Floridablanca set a roadmap for new negotiations with Algiers. The final treaty of peace was signed by the Dey of Algiers on 17 June 1786 and by the King of Spain on 27 August 1786. However the terms of the versions of the treaty differed, and this caused some problems afterwards.

=== History of modern relations ===
The Francoist dictatorship officially recognized Algeria as a sovereign state in 1962 and proceeded to appoint an ambassador. Spain's bilateral relations with the Algerian republic, which were not good during Francoism, would later experience a crisis in 1977–1978, when Algeria—cut off from the 1975 Tripartite Madrid Accords on the transfer of the administration of Western Sahara—came to provide instrumental support to the Canary Islands Independence Movement, as well as to Sahrawi nationalism.

The two countries signed a treaty of friendship, good neighbourliness and cooperation on 8 October 2002 in Madrid. The two states cooperate on anti-terrorism issues. The triangular balance between Algeria, Morocco and Spain influences the Spanish position on the conflict of Western Sahara; Algeria is committed to the referendum on self-determination, while calling for a stronger commitment from Spain on this on the basis of the latter's "historical responsibility".

Both countries reinforced ties in 2013. Algeria and Spain positioned themselves as important partners in 2015, remaining linked "with strong relations" as of 2017.

In March 2022, following a letter made public sent by Spanish Prime Minister Pedro Sánchez to King Mohamed VI of Morocco in which he assured that the proposal for an autonomy regime for Western Sahara that Morocco made in 2007 is the "most serious, realistic and credible" proposal for the resolution of the conflict, and the confirmation by the Spanish Minister of Foreign Affairs, José Manuel Albares that showed his confidence that there would be no retaliation for this turn by Algeria, the Algerian government called its ambassador, Saïd Moussi, in Spain to consultations. The content of the letter and the change in the position of the Spanish government in the conflict of the Western Sahara was rejected by the rest of Spanish political parties, including Unidas Podemos, the minor member of the government coalition.

In April 2022, Abdelmadjid Tebboune said "we have very strong ties with the Spanish state, but the head of government [Pedro Sanchez] broke everything," before assuring that Algeria would "never renounce its commitments to ensure the supply of gas to Spain whatever the circumstances".

On 9 June 2022, as a result of the new Spanish position regarding Morocco and the Western Sahara, Algeria decided to suspend the friendship and cooperation treaty that united the two nations Hours later, there were news reports that Algeria was suspending foreign trade with Spain. Spain, for its part, is studying denouncing Algeria to the European Union Brussels was "extremely concerned" said EU foreign affairs spokeswoman Nabila Massrali, "We would ask the Algerian party to take another look at that decision", she added.

On 10 June 2022 José Manuel Albares travelled to Brussels to raise the issue and find a way to resolve the row with Algeria. "The EU is ready to stand up against any type of coercive measures applied against an EU Member State," EU foreign policy chief Josep Borrell and European Commission Vice President Valdis Dombrovskis said in a joint statement. Algeria replied through the voice of its diplomatic representation in Brussels, "the Algerian Commission to the European Union deplores the haste with which the European Commission reacted without prior consultation or any verification with the Algerian government", adding that "regarding the alleged measure by the government to stop current transactions with a European partner, it only exists in the minds of those who claim it and those who are eager to stigmatize it."

On 11 June 2022 the department of Ramtane Lamamra declared in a press release that the decision to suspend the Treaty of Friendship responds to "legitimate considerations, which essentially relate to the fact that the partner has released itself from obligations and essential values enshrined in this Treaty, thus taking on the responsibility of emptying this legal instrument of its substance and calling into question its relevance in the relations between the two parties to the said treaty." It also deplored and rejected "the hasty and unfounded statements" that were made on behalf of the European Union following "the sovereign decision taken by Algeria to suspend the Treaty of Friendship", describing the insinuations and questions relating to the gas supplies to Spain as "fanciful" and "malicious", given that the Algerian President himself had already affirmed the determination of Algeria to fulfil its contractual obligations.

In November 2023, 19 months after recalling the ambassador, Algeria decided to return a diplomatic representative to Spain, Abdelfetah Daghmoum, who was subsequently granted approval by the Spanish Council of Ministers.

In March 2026, Algeria decided to reactivate the terms of the 2002 Treaty of Friendship, which had been frozen since October 2022.

== Resident diplomatic missions ==
- Algeria has an embassy in Madrid and consulates-general in Alicante and Barcelona.
- Spain has an embassy in Algiers and a consulate-general in Oran.

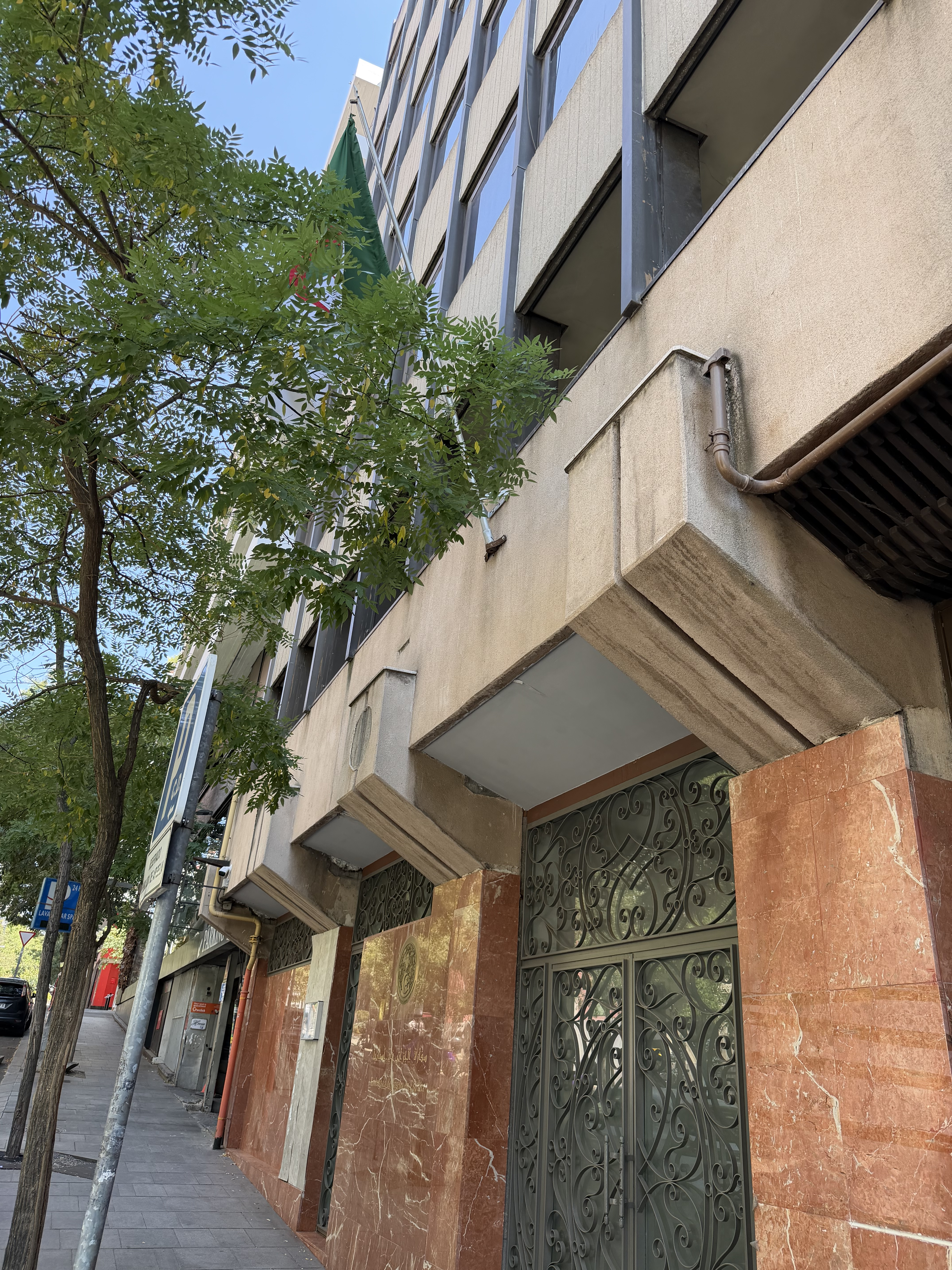
Embassy of Algeria in Madrid

Consulate-General of Algeria in Alicante

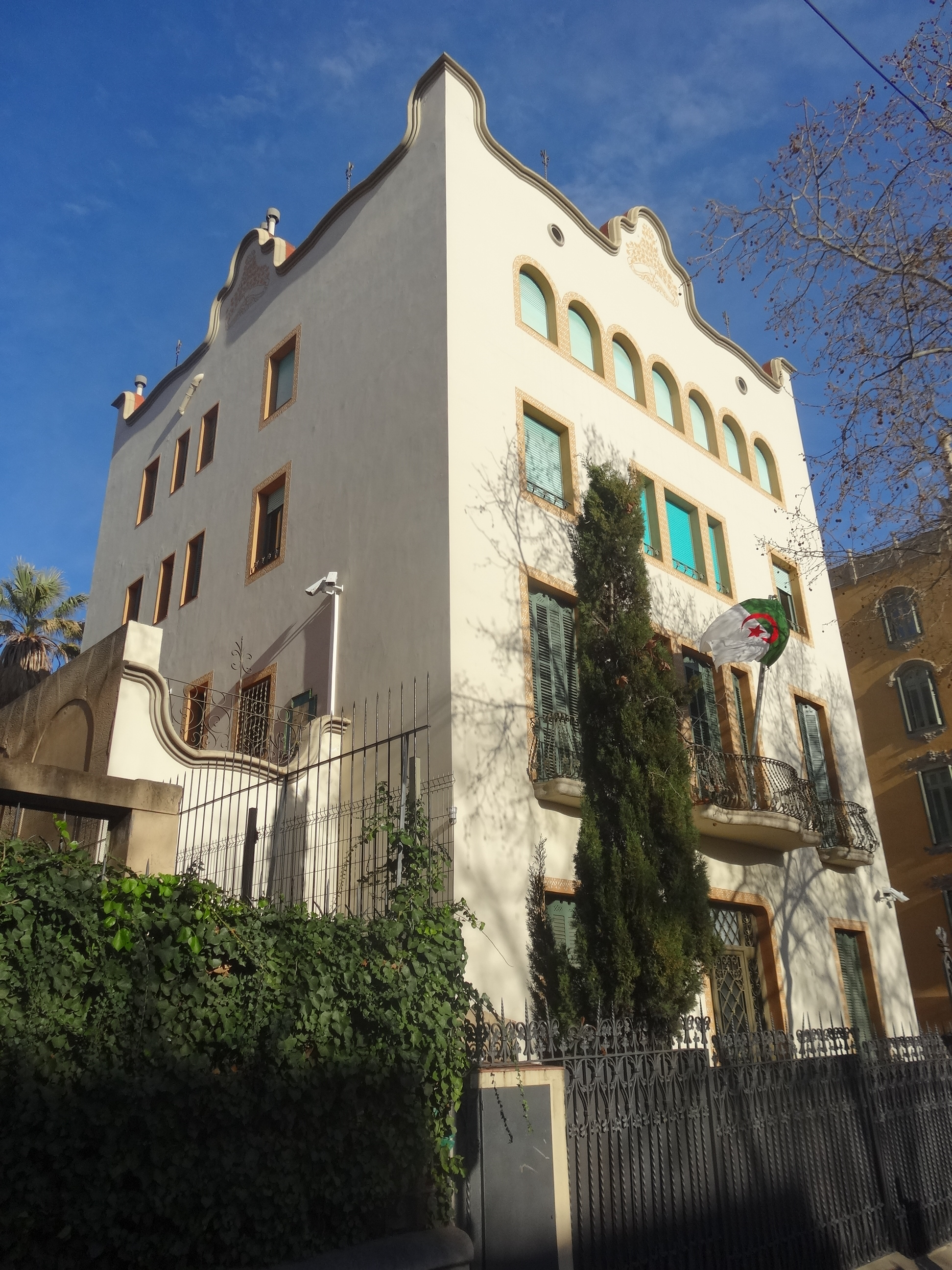
Consulate-General of Algeria în Barcelona

== See also ==
- List of ambassadors of Spain to Algeria
- Algerians in Spain
