= Alberto Ullastres =

Spanish politician (1914–2001)

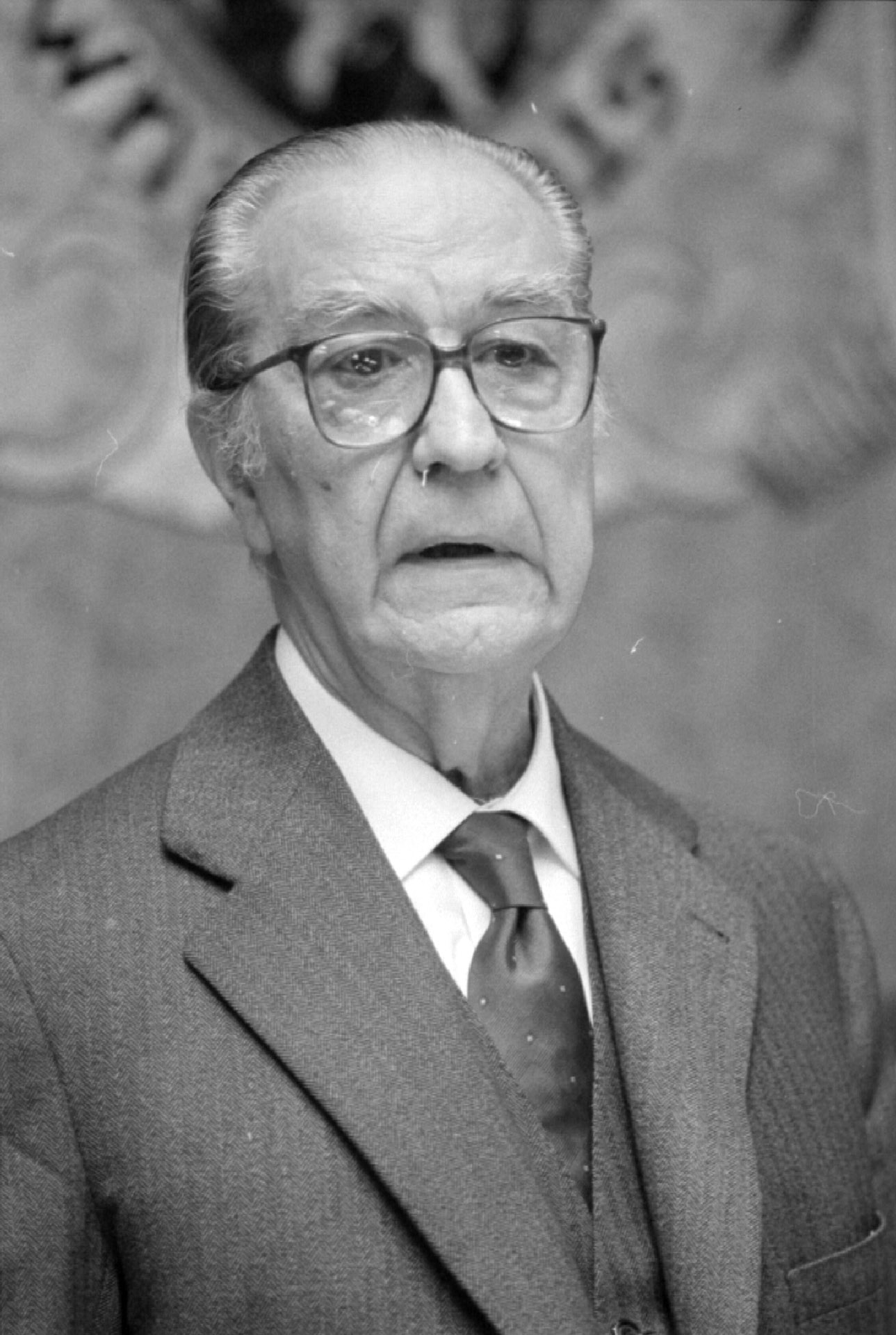
- Ullastres in 1990

Minister of Trade
- In office February 26, 1957 – July 8, 1965
- Preceded by: Manuel Arburúa de la Miyar
- Succeeded by: Faustino García-Moncó

Ambassador Head of Mission of Spain to the European Communities
- In office October 8, 1965 – November 13, 1976
- Preceded by: José Núñez Iglesias
- Succeeded by: Raimundo Bassols

Personal details
- Born: January 15, 1914 Madrid, Spain
- Died: November 15, 2001 (aged 87) Madrid, Spain
- Education: Complutense University of Madrid

Alberto Ullastres (15 January 1914 – 15 November 2001) was Spain's trade minister (1957–1965) and ambassador to the European Economic Community (1965–1976) under Francisco Franco. Ullastres was part of the so-called "Opusdeistas" – ministers under Franco who were also members of the Opus Dei organisation.

== Life ==
He was born in Madrid on 15 January 1914 and died in Madrid on 15 November 2001.

He studied law and commerce. He obtained a doctorate in law from the University of Madrid. He was university professor (catedratico) for political economy.

== Economic studies and work ==
Because of the so-called Spanish miracle, which has been attributed to him and the other Spanish technocrats, Ullastres has been counted among the "great economists". He studied the economic doctrines of the School of Salamanca of the 16th and 17th centuries, especially the doctrine of Juan de Mariana and of Martín de Azpilcueta.

In an article "The Awakening Land", Time magazine attributed Spain's economic modernization to him: "On a hot July day in 1959, Ullastres announced a sweeping stabilization plan. Credit was tightened, the budget slashed, the peseta devalued to a realistic 60 to the dollar. With the aid of a $400 million international loan, Ullastres threw open Spain's doors to imports necessary to rebuild its economy. And over the howls of government protectionists, he pushed through a series of measures to encourage foreign investors to enter Spain. The success of the stabilization plan was miraculous. By 1963 Spain had $1.1 billion in foreign reserves and a booming economy."

== Minister of Trade ==
On February 26, 1957, Ullastres replaced Manuel Arburúa de la Miyar as minister of trade. From this position, he pushed forward the so-called Stabilization Plan which brought about Spain's transition from economic autarchy to liberalization and internationalization of the national economy, an economic success which has been called the Spanish miracle.

Also, he was the first trade minister to establish relations with the European Common Market and promoted Spain's integration into major international economic organizations, such as the International Monetary Fund, the General Agreement on Tariffs and Trade, the World Bank, and the European Organization for Economic Cooperation (now the Organisation for Economic Co-operation and Development, OECD).

== Ambassador in Europe ==
His pro-European vocation and his support for greater economic openness to the European market led him to be appointed head of the Mission of Spain to the European Communities (the European Economic Community, the European Atomic Energy Community, and the European Coal and Steel Community) in 1965, a position he held until 1976.

Ullastres enjoyed great autonomy in managing European diplomatic relations and, under his leadership, important treaties such as the Preferential Trade Agreement between Spain and the European Economic Community of 1970 were negotiated.

On November 7, 1973, an ETA commando attempted to kidnap him at his home in Brussels, but a change in his usual routine and the reaction of an employee thwarted the operation.

== Private activities ==
From 1986 to 1994, Ullastres worked in the private sector, serving as Customer Advocate for BBVA.

From 1977 to 2001, Ullastres coordinated the "European Union courses" —also known as "Ullastres courses"— of the Spanish Ministry of Foreign Affairs.
