= Alfonso Dastis =

Spanish diplomat (born 1955)

The Most Excellent Alfonso Dastis
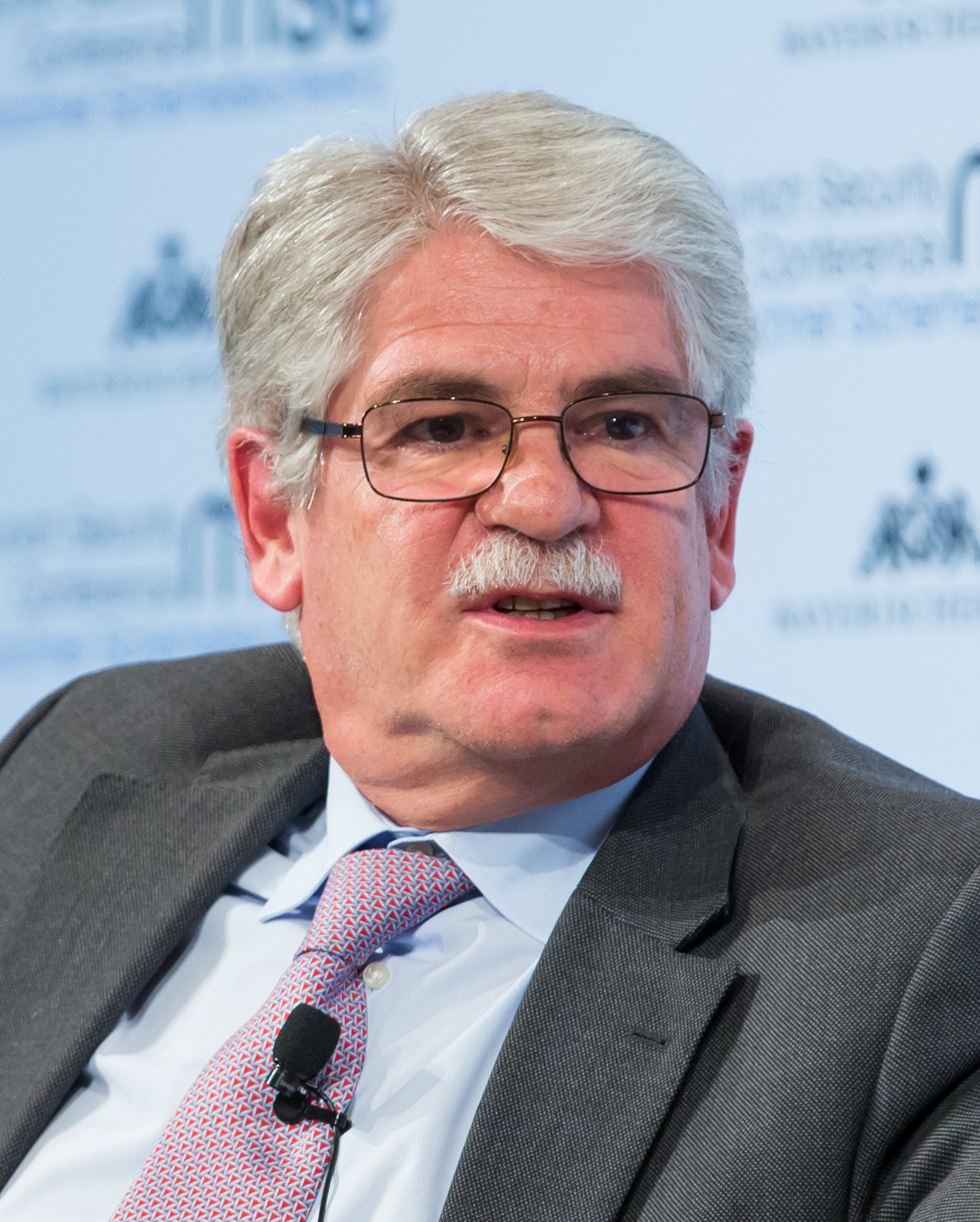
- Dastis in 2018

Minister of Foreign Affairs
- In office 4 November 2016 – 7 June 2018
- Prime Minister: Mariano Rajoy
- Preceded by: José Manuel García-Margallo
- Succeeded by: Josep Borrell

Ambassador of Spain to Hungary
- In office 12 October 2022 – 24 September 2025
- Preceded by: Anunciada Fernández de Córdova
- Succeeded by: Luis Ángel Redondo Gómez
Diplomatic offices
Ambassador of Spain to Italy
In office 10 September 2018 – 12 October 2022
Preceded by	Jesús Gracia Aldaz
Succeeded by	Miguel Ángel Fernández-Palacios
Ambassador of Spain to San Marino
In office 3 November 2018 – 12 October 2022
Preceded by	Jesús Gracia Aldaz
Succeeded by	Miguel Ángel Fernández-Palacios
Ambassador Permanent Representative of Spain to the European Union
In office 21 December 2011 – 4 November 2016
Preceded by	Luis Planas
Succeeded by	Juan Pablo García-Berdoy
Ambassador of Spain to the Netherlands
In office 26 June 2004 – 1 September 2007
Preceded by	Carlos Manuel de Benavides y Salas
Succeeded by	Juan Prat y Coll
Political offices
Secretary-General for European Affairs
In office 7 September 2002 – 20 April 2004
Preceded by	Carlos Bastarreche
Succeeded by	Miguel Ángel Navarro Portera

Personal details
- Born: Alfonso María Dastis Quecedo; 5 October 1955 (age 70) Jerez de la Frontera, Spain
- Party: Independent
- Education: CEU San Pablo University; Complutense University

Alfonso María Dastis Quecedo (born 5 October 1955) is a Spanish diplomat, who served as Minister of Foreign Affairs of Spain from 2016 until 1 June 2018, when a vote of no-confidence against Mariano Rajoy ousted the government. Prior to becoming Minister he held several positions within the Spanish Diplomatic Corps. Until 2022, he was the Ambassador of Spain to the Republic of Italy.

== Education ==
Dastis studied law at the CEU San Pablo University in the 1970s, then attended the public Complutense University of Madrid. He embarked on a doctoral thesis on the freedom of establishment of insurance companies, but abandoned it in 1983.

== Career ==
Dastis entered the Diplomatic Corps in 1983. As a career diplomat he held several positions linked to the Ministry of Foreign Affairs and to international institutions, such as in the Spanish Embassy to the UN, the Minister's Staff, and the Prime Minister's Office. In 2002, he was named Secretary General for European Affairs.

Between 1987 and 1989, Dastis worked as a law clerk for one of his former professors, Gil Carlos Rodríguez Iglesias, Spain's first judge at the European Court of Justice (ECJ) and a subsequent president of that court.

As Spain's legal adviser at the United Nations, Dastis deputised occasionally for Spain's ambassador in 1993-94 when Spain held a seat on the United Nations Security Council and cast Spain's vote at the Security Council meeting that accepted the Czech Republic and Slovakia as members after they had split. Dastis was EU adviser to José Maria Aznar from 1996 to 2000. Among other things, he was in charge of organising Spain's presidency of the Council of the European Union, which ran in the first half of 2002. At the end of 2001, Aznar nominated him as Spanish delegate to the Convention on the Future of Europe, alongside Ana de Palacio y del Valle-Lersundi. In this capacity, he pushed against making the Union's common foreign and security policy (CFSP) subject to the jurisdiction of the ECJ.

Dastis attained the rank of Ambassador in 2004 being named Ambassador to the Netherlands. In 2011 Dastis was named Permanent Representative of Spain to the European Union. In 2016 Dastis was named Minister of Foreign Affairs in the second Rajoy government.

During the 2017-18 Spanish constitutional crisis, Dastis claimed in an interview with BBC News that several videos purporting to show clashes during the 1 October Catalan independence referendum were fake, and defended the actions of the Civil Guard and National Police.

In 2018, after leaving the Foreign Ministry, he was posted in Italy, as ambassador. In November that year, he was also appointed Ambassador to San Marino.

From October 2022 to September 2025, he was Ambassador of Spain to Hungary.

Dastis retired from active service in October 2025, after 42 years in the diplomatic corps.

== Personal life ==
Dastis is married to a lawyer. He is a keen golfer.

== See also ==
- List of foreign ministers in 2017

Political offices
Preceded by José Manuel García-Margallo	Minister of Foreign Affairs; 2016–2018	Succeeded by Josep Borrell
