= Santiago Cabanas =

Spanish diplomat (born 1954)

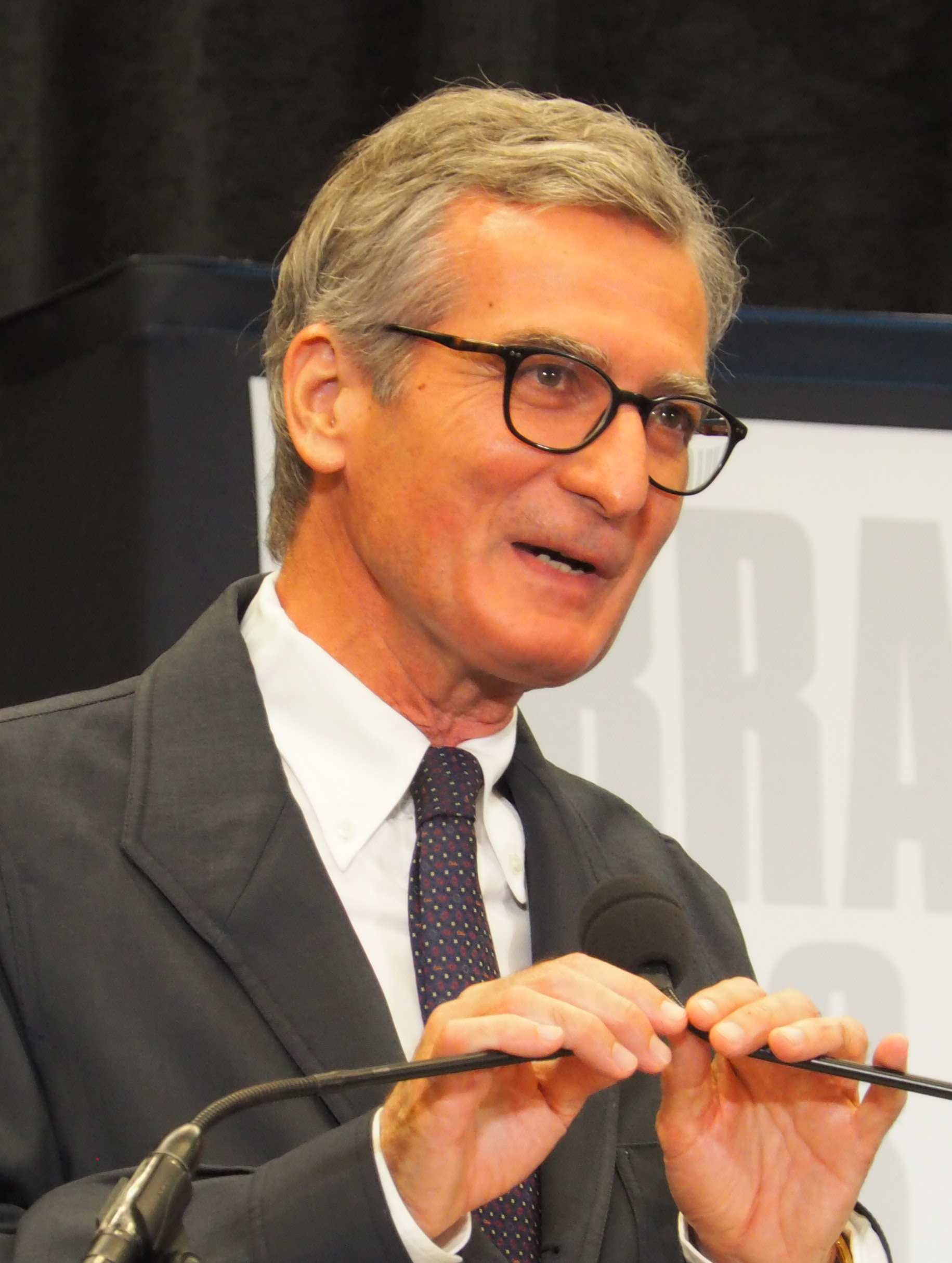
- Cabanas in 2019

Ambassador of Spain to the United States of America
- In office September 2018 – February 2024
- Preceded by: Pedro Morenés
- Succeeded by: Ángeles Moreno Bau

Ambassador of Spain to Algeria
- In office 2017–2018

Ambassador of Spain to Jordan
- In office 2013–2017

Ambassador of Spain to the Czech Republic
- In office 2000–2004

Personal details
- Born: 23 March 1954 (age 72) Madrid, Spain
- Education: Lic. Autonomous University of Madrid

Santiago Cabanas Ansorena (born 1954) is a Spanish retired diplomat.

== Biography ==
Born on 23 March 1954 in Madrid, Cabanas earned a licentiate degree in Law from the Autonomous University of Madrid (UAM). He joined the diplomatic career in 1981.

He has served in several senior posts at the Ministry of Foreign Affairs, including Director-General of Cultural and Scientific Relations (1996–1998), Director-General of Consular and Migratory Affairs (2010–2011), Director-General of Foreign Policy.

He was destined as Ambassador to the Czech Republic (2000–2004), Jordan (2013–2017) and Algeria (2017–2018). He was also designated as Consul in Miami (2005–2010).

Appointed as Ambassador to the United States in September 2018 in replacement of Pedro Morenés, Cabanas presented his diplomatic credentials to US President Donald Trump on 17 September 2018.

At the age of 70 and, after 43 years of service, Cabanas retired. He was replaced by Ángeles Moreno Bau in February 2024.
