= Interministerial Committees =

The Interministerial Committees, in Spain, are a collective work body and sometimes decision-making-body consisting of senior officials of the State Administration belonging to different departments. To be considered an interministerial committee it is needed to be composed by at least three members and be able to make decisions, make proposals, advise or control a specific matter.

Unlike the Government Delegated Committees, to this committees may attend officials from other administrations or representatives of social interest organizations.

== Common notes ==
=== Powers ===
The powers of the interministerial committees vary among themselves since their specific functions are established in their constitutive instrument. However, they need to have one of this competences:

- Decision-making powers.
- The power for proposing or issuance of compulsory reports that should serve as a basis for decisions of other administrative bodies.
- Powers to monitor or control the actions of other bodies of the General State Administration.

=== Requirements ===
The constitutive instrument of this committees is not always the same:

- If the chair of the committee has the rank of director-general or more, a royal decree it is needed.
- If the chair of the committee has a lower rank of that of director-general, a joint ministerial order it is needed (this means, an order issued by the ministers of the departments involved).

== Current committees ==
These are some of the committees that are currently active:

Name	Chair	Deputy Chair	Scope
Defence	The Secretary-General for Defence Policy	The Director-General for Defence Policy	To prepare the meetings of the National Defence Council and execute its decisions and to prepare the defence resources in case of crisis.
European Union Affairs	The Secretary of State for the European Union	The Secretary of State for Economy and Business	To coordinate the Administration action in the EU and to resolve inter-ministerial issues, mainly of economic nature.
Immigration Affairs	The Secretary of State for Migration		To consider issues relating on immigration and the right of asylum and to make studies and reports about the European and national migration policy and its consequences.
Tourism	The Minister of Industry, Trade and Tourism	The Secretary of State for Tourism	To consider issues relating on tourism.
Statistics	The President of the National Statistics Institute		To consider issues relating statistics and support the Superior Council of Statistics.
Medicine Prices	The Secretary-General for Health and Consumer Affairs	The Director-General for the Basic Portfolio of Services of the NHS and Pharmacy	To establish the maximum prize of medicines offered by the National Health System and to consider matters about state-finance medicines.
Equality between Women and Men	The Minister of the Presidency, Relations with the Cortes and Equality	The Secretary of State for Equality	To oversee the integration of the principle of Equal Treatment within the Administration as well as coordinating the different department policies on equality and eradication of violence against women.
Monitoring the Measures Adopted by the Congress' Defense Committee	The Minister of Defence	The Under Secretary of Defence	To consider matter relating the measures adopted by the Defence Committee of the Congress of Deputies as wells as improving the exchange of information between departments.
Implementation of BIM	The Under Secretary of Development	The Director-General for State Heritage	To coordinate the implementation of the Building Information Modelling' methodology.
Climate Change and Energy Transition	The Minister for the Ecological Transition	The Secretary of State for Economy and Business	To coordinate the actions on the National Plan for Energy and Climate, on decarbonization, on just transition and on the elaboration of the Climate Change and Energy Transition Draft Bill.
Ecological Criteria in Public Hiring	The Under Secretary for the Ecological Transition	The Director-General for State Heritage	To coordinate the State Administration bodies and agencies in order to integrate an ecological criteria in public hiring.
Social Criteria in Public Hiring	The Secretary of State for Social Services	The Director-General for State Heritage	To coordinate the State Administration bodies and agencies in order to integrate a social criteria in public hiring.
Marine Strategies	The Secretary of State for Environment	The Director-General for Sustainability of the Coast and the Sea	To share and analyze common information about marine environment and to control and propose the marine strategies.
Coordination of the State Peripheral Administration	The Minister of Territorial Policy and Civil Service	The Secretary of State for Territorial Policy	To coordinate the Peripheral Administration and to facilitate the exchange of information.
Evaluation and Accreditation of Professional Competences Acquired by Work Experience	Director-General of the Public State Employment Service/Director General for Vocational Training	Director-General of the Public State Employment Service/Director General for Vocational Training	To evaluate and boost the requirements applied by the Administrations to recognize the experience acquired by work and not just by study.
National Action Plan for Social Inclusion	The Minister of Labour	The Secretary of State for Social Services	To consider European or national matters relating social inclusion and social protection.
Treaties and Other International Agreements			To coordinate the State, the regions and the autonomous cities of Ceuta and Melilla in the compliance with international treaties.
International Cooperation	The Secretary of State for International Cooperation	The Director-General for Sustainable Development Policies	To coordinate the international cooperation policies of the different administrations and elaborate the Master Plan and the Annual Plan about this matters.
International Aerospace Policy	The Secretary of State for Foreign Affairs	Under Secretary of Development	To advise the Government on international aviation and space policy.
International Maritime Policy	The Secretary of State for Foreign Affairs	Under Secretary of Development	To advise the Government on maritime issues relevant to Spain.
Weapons and Explosives	The Technical Secretary-General of the Ministry of the Interior	The Deputy Technical Secretary-General of the Ministry of the Interior	To consider issues relating the weapons and explosives regulation.
National Plan for Preventive Actions against the Effects of Excess Temperatures on Health	The Director-General for Public Health, Quality and Innovation		To consider preventive actions and strategies to ensure a proper application of the National Plan for Preventive Actions against the Effects of Excess Temperatures on Health.
Coordination of Cultural 1%	The Minister of Culture and Sport		To establish the conservation plans financed by the 1% legal tax on every public work destined to the conservation of the Spanish historical heritage.
Rural Environment	The Minister for the Ecological Transition		To consider issues relating rural development.
Coordination of the Defence and Development Ministries	The Chief of the Operations Division of the Air Force Staff	The Technical Secretary-General of the Ministry of the Development	To consider all aire-related matters involving both ministries.
Steel Structures	The Technical Secretary-General of the Ministry of the Development		To consider matters relating to the use of steel on Infrastructures.
Concrete	The Technical Secretary-General of the Ministry of the Development		To consider matters relating to Concrete or prefabricated related materials.
Coordination of the Transport of Perishable Goods	The Under Secretary of Development		To consider issues relating the transportation of perishable goods and to serve as a connection port between the international organizations and the national administrations.
National Climate Council	The Minister for the Ecological Transition	The Secretary of State for Climate Change	To make recommendations about the government policy on climate change.
Follow-up of the UK withdrawal from the EU	The Deputy Prime Minister		Created in 2016 to follow up all the matters relating the UK withdrawal from the EU.
Food Management	The President of the AESAN		Created in 2021 to coordinate and harmonize the regulatory provisions relating to the food sector.
