= Juan Pablo García-Berdoy =

Spanish diplomat

Juan Pablo García-Berdoy OIC OMFRG
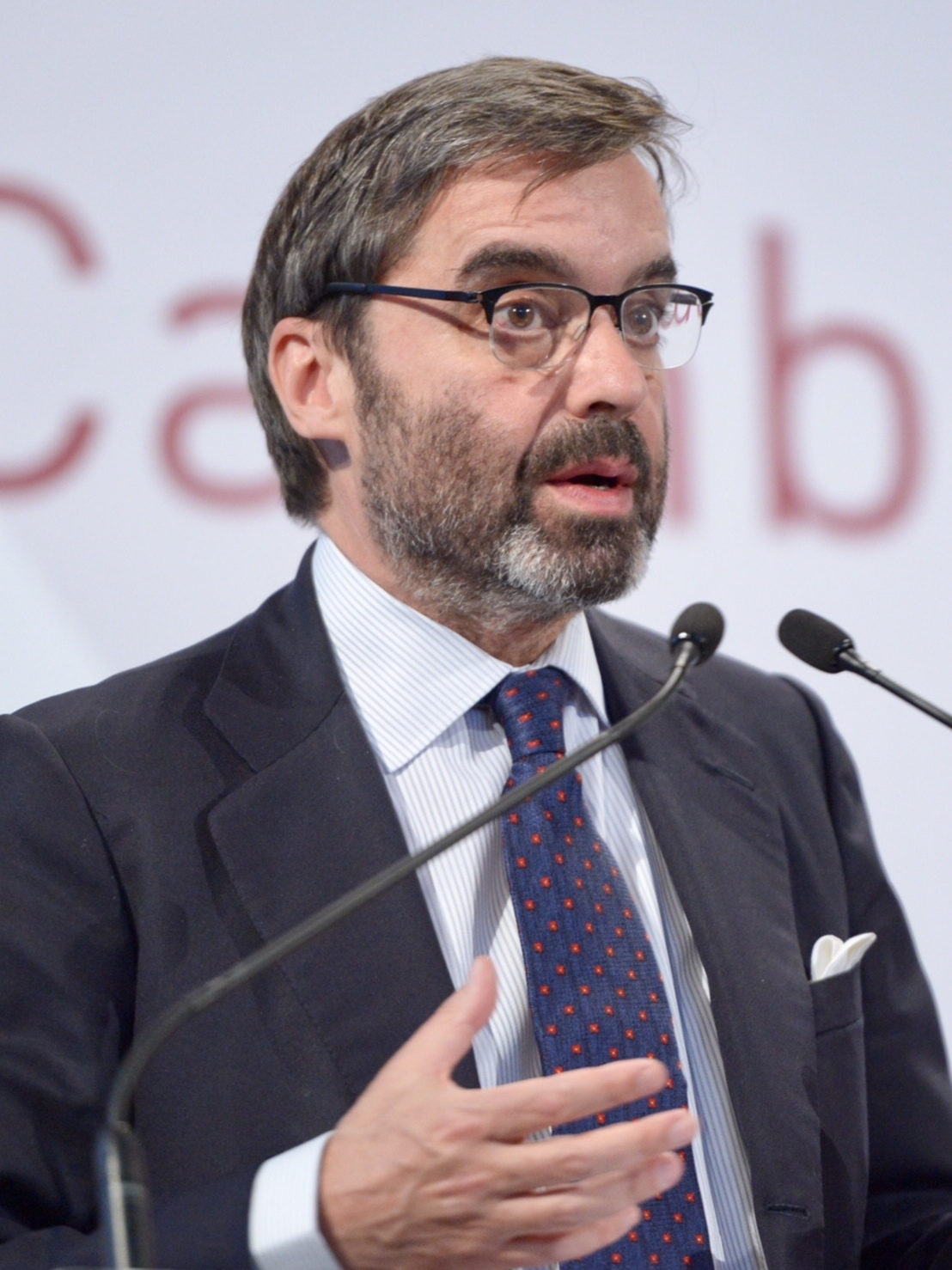

Ambassador Permanent Representative of Spain to the European Union
- In office 3 December 2016 – 21 July 2021
- Prime Minister: Mariano Rajoy; Pedro Sánchez
- Preceded by: Alfonso Dastis
- Succeeded by: Marcos Alonso Alonso

Ambassador of Spain to Germany
- In office 10 March 2012 – 3 December 2016
- Preceded by: Rafael Dezcallar
- Succeeded by: María Victoria Morera
Diplomatic offices
Ambassador of Spain to Romania
In office 15 January 2005 – 4 March 2009
Preceded by	Jesús Atienza Serna
Succeeded by	Estanislao de Grandes
Ambassador of Spain to Moldova
In office 26 June 2005 – 4 March 2009
Preceded by	Jesús Atienza Serna
Succeeded by	Estanislao de Grandes
Political offices
Director-General for Foreign Policy (Europe)
In office 21 December 2002 – 8 May 2004
Preceded by	Ricardo Díez-Hochleitner Rodríguez
Succeeded by	Josep Maria Pons Irazazábal

Personal details
- Born: Juan Pablo García-Berdoy y Cerezo; 9 March 1961 (age 65) Madrid, Spain

Juan Pablo García-Berdoy Cerezo (born 9 March 1961) is a Spanish diplomat and lawyer who served as the Ambassador Permanent Representative of Spain to the European Union from 2016 to 2021. Previously, he has served as ambassador of Spain to Romania, Moldova and Germany, as well as director-general in the Ministry of Foreign Affairs.

== Biography ==
García Berdoy was born in the City of Madrid in 1961. He has a degree in law and speaks five languages: Spanish, English, French, German and Romanian. He is married and he has two children.

He started his diplomatic career in May 1987 when he was appointed Technical Advisor to the Cabinet of the Minister of Foreign Affairs, Francisco Fernández Ordóñez. In 1988 he was appointed Consul of Spain to Manila, being appointed Technical Advisor again in 1990. A few months later, he was appointed Technical Advisor for the Relations of Spain with the Central and Eastern European countries.

From December 1991 to January 1996, García-Berdoy was Advisor to the Ambassador of Spain to Germany being in charge of european affairs. During this period, he was also a relevant member of the Directorate for European Affairs of the German Foreign Ministry and member of the Presidency of the Reflection Group for the reform of the Maastricht Treaty. In 1996, he was appointed Chief of Staff to the Secretary of State for the European Union and in 2000 he was appointed Chief of Staff to the President of the Congress of Deputies. Between 2002 and 2004, he served as Director-General for Foreign Policy (Europe) in the Foreign Ministry.

He assumed the office of ambassador for the first time in January 2005 when he was appointed Ambassador of Spain to Romania and in June he was appointed also Ambassador of Spain to Moldova. He left this positions in 2009 to found the Aspen Institute Spain.

In March 2012, prime minister Mariano Rajoy appointed him Ambassador of Spain to Germany and in December 2016 he was appointed Permanent Representative of Spain to the European Union when Alfonso Dastis was appointed foreign minister. In July 2021, Marcos Alonso Alonso was appointed as his replacement. In 2024 he was working for LLYC as a public affairs representative for Europe.
