= List of ambassadors of Spain to the Council of Europe =

Ambassador Permanent Representative of Spain to the Council of Europe
- Coat of arms of Spain
- Incumbent; Rosa Velázquez Álvarez since 27 August 2025
- Ministry of Foreign Affairs; Secretariat of State for the European Union
- Style: The Most Excellent
- Member of: Permanent Mission of Spain to the Council of Europe
- Residence: Strasbourg, France
- Nominator: The Foreign Minister
- Appointer: The Monarch
- Inaugural holder: José Luis Messía
- Formation: December 17, 1977; 48 years ago
- Website: Mission of Spain to the Council of Europe

The ambassador permanent representative of Spain to the Council of Europe is the official representative of the Kingdom of Spain to the Council of Europe, the main international organization about human rights, democracy and the rule of law in the European continent.

== Permanent representation ==
The office was established in December 1977, after Spain's accession to the Council of Europe.

As of 2025, it is a small representation, composed of a Permanent Representative and a Deputy Permanent Representative, both with the rank of ambassador, a Counsellor, with the rank of Embassy Counsellor, a Chancellery and auxiliary staff.

== List of ambassadors ==
Ambassador		Term	Nominated by	Appointed by
1	José Luis Messía; Marquess of Busianos	17 December 1977 – 9 April 1983 (5 years, 113 days)	The Marquess of Oreja	Juan Carlos I
2	Fernando Baeza Martos	9 April 1983 – 3 August 1987 (4 years, 116 days)	Fernando Morán	Juan Carlos I
3	José Manuel Lacleta Muñoz	3 August 1987 – 16 December 1991 (4 years, 135 days)	Francisco Fernández Ordóñez	Juan Carlos I
4	Emilio Artacho Castellano	16 December 1991 – 1 June 1996 (4 years, 168 days)	Francisco Fernández Ordóñez	Juan Carlos I
5	Guillermo Kirkpatrick Mendaro	1 June 1996 – 19 October 2002 (6 years, 140 days)	Abel Matutes	Juan Carlos I
6	Estanislao de Grandes	19 October 2002 – 31 July 2006 (5 years, 113 days)	Ana Palacio	Juan Carlos I
7	Fernando Mansito Caballero	31 July 2006 – 24 November 2007 (1 year, 116 days)	Miguel Ángel Moratinos	Juan Carlos I
8	Marta Vilardell Coma	24 November 2007 – 5 March 2011 (3 years, 101 days)	Miguel Ángel Moratinos	Juan Carlos I
9	Fernando Alvargonzález	5 March 2011 – 22 March 2014 (3 years, 17 days)	Trinidad Jiménez	Juan Carlos I
10	Luis Javier Gil Catalina	22 March 2014 – 28 July 2018 (4 years, 128 days)	José Manuel García-Margallo	Juan Carlos I
11	Manuel Montobbio de Balanzó	28 July 2018 – 25 January 2023 (4 years, 181 days)	Josep Borrell	Felipe VI
12	Juan Ignacio Morro	25 January 2023 – 27 August 2025 (2 years, 214 days)	José Manuel Albares	Felipe VI
13	Rosa Velázquez Álvarez	27 August 2025 – Present (1 year, 11 days)	José Manuel Albares	Felipe VI
