= List of ambassadors of Spain to the Czech Republic =

Ambassador of Spain to Czech Republic
- Coat of arms of Spain
- Incumbent; María Pérez Sánchez-Laulhé since 1 May 2024
- Ministry of Foreign Affairs; Secretariat of State for the European Union
- Style: The Most Excellent
- Residence: Prague
- Nominator: The Foreign Minister
- Appointer: The Monarch
- Term length: At the government's pleasure
- Inaugural holder: Gonzalo Fernández de Córdova y Moreno
- Formation: 1977
- Website: Mission of Spain to Czechia

The ambassador of Spain to the Czech Republic is the official representative of the Kingdom of Spain to the Czech Republic.

Czechoslovakia and Spain established diplomatic relations on 19 June 1919. The Second World War interrupted these relations, but on 16 November 1970 both countries signed an agreement to establish bilateral consular and trade representations. Finally, diplomatic relations were re-established on 9 February 1977, with embassy status.

Following the dissolution of Czechoslovakia in 1992, Spain recognized the new states and maintained the diplomatic representation for both countries in Prague. In 1997, Spain transferred the diplomatic relations with Slovakia to an independent ambassador seated in Bratislava.

== List of ambassadors ==
This list was compiled using the work "History of the Spanish Diplomacy" by the Spanish historian and diplomat Miguel Ángel Ochoa Brun. The work covers up to the year 2000, so the rest is based on appointments published in the Boletín Oficial del Estado.

Name	Rank	Term
Francisco Serrat y Bonastre (Note: During this time, Francisco Serrat y Bonastre held the position (November 1919 – May 1920), however, he was serving in Tangier, so both Daniel Carballo and Manuel Walls were appointed on an interim basis. Francisco Serrat never assumed the office in Prague, as in 1920 he was confirmed as officeholder of the position in Tangier.)	Minister	1919–1920
Daniel Carballo y Prat; Count of Pradere	Minister a.i.	1919
Manuel Walls y Merino	Minister a.i.	1919–1920
Pedro Sebastián de Erice	Minister	1920–1925
Daniel Carballo y Prat; Count of Pradere	Minister	1925–1926
Santiago Méndez de Vigo y Méndez de Vigo	Minister	1926–1927
Joaquín de Ezpeleta y Montenegro	Minister	1927–1930
Buenaventura Caro y del Arroyo	Minister	1930–1932
Francisco Agramonte Cortijo	Minister	1932–1934
Luis García Guijarro	Minister	1935–1936
Emilio Sanz y Tovar (Note: Representing the Rebel Government during the Spanish Civil War.); Count of Lizárraga	Diplomatic agent	1936
Gaspar Sanz y Tovar	Diplomatic agent	1936
Luis Jiménez de Asúa (Note: Representing the Republican Government during the Spanish Civil War.)	Chargé d'affaires	1936–1937
Luis Jiménez de Asúa	Minister	1937–1939
Break in diplomatic relations
José María Trías de Bes y Borrás	Head of Mission-Consular and Trade Representative	1971–1973
Electo José García Tejedor	Head of Mission-Consular and Trade Representative	1973–1977
Gonzalo Fernández de Córdova y Moreno	Ambassador	1977–1981
Fernando Benito Mestre	Ambassador	1981–1983
Carlos de la Figuera y Jagou	Ambassador	1983–1988
José Luis Dicenta	Ambassador	1988–1991
Roberto Bermúdez Ruiz (Note: Accredited to Slovakia.)	Ambassador	1991–1996
Juan Manuel de Barandica y Luján	Ambassador	1996–2000
Santiago Cabanas	Ambassador	2000–2004
Antonio Pedauyé González	Ambassador	2004–2008
Arturo Laclaustra	Ambassador	2008–2011
Pascual Navarro Ríos	Ambassador	2011–2014
Pedro Calvo-Sotelo Ibáñez-Martín	Ambassador	2014–2018
Ángel Lossada Torres-Quevedo	Ambassador	2018–2022
Alberto Moreno Humet	Ambassador	2022–2024
María Pérez Sánchez-Laulhé	Ambassador	2024–pres.

== See also ==
- Czech Republic–Spain relations
