= Pascual Navarro Ríos =

Spanish diplomat

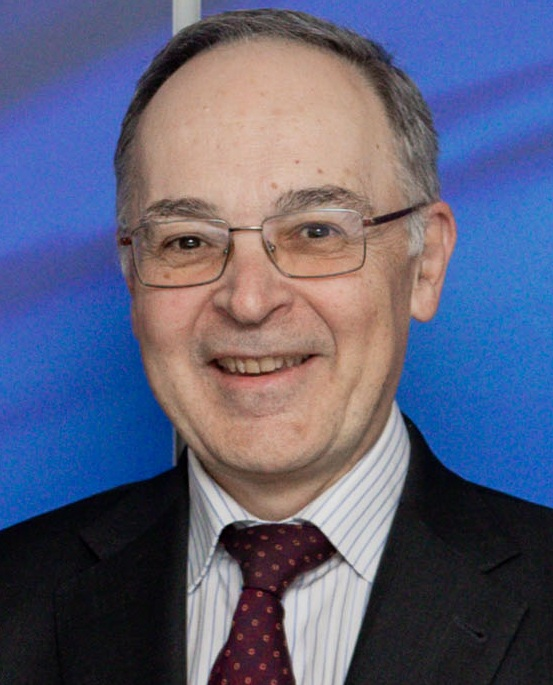

Ambassador of Spain to Germany
- Incumbent
- Assumed office 14 February 2024
- Preceded by: Ricardo Martínez Vázquez

Secretary of State for the European Union
- In office 22 December 2021 – 19 December 2023
- Preceded by: Juan González-Barba Pera
- Succeeded by: Fernando Sampedro

Secretary-General for the European Union
- In office 29 September 2021 – 22 December 2021
- Preceded by: Office re-established Previously: Miguel Ángel Navarro Portera
- Succeeded by: María Dolores Lledó Laredo
Other posts
Director-General for Coordination of the Internal Market and Other Community Policies
In office 29 July 2017 – 29 September 2021
Preceded by	Alejandro Abellán García de Diego
Succeeded by	María Dolores Lledó Laredo
Ambassador of Spain to the Czech Republic
In office 27 August 2011 – 29 November 2014
Preceded by	Arturo Laclaustra Beltrán
Succeeded by	Pedro Calvo-Sotelo Ibáñez-Martín

Personal details
- Born: Pascual Ignacio Navarro Ríos; 1 June 1960 (age 66) Cartagena, Spain
- Education: University of Murcia

Pascual Navarro Ríos (born 1 June 1960) is a Spanish diplomat who currently serves as Ambassador of Spain to Germany since 2024.

== Biography ==
Born in Cartagena (Murcia) in 1960, Navarro holds a degree in law from the University of Murcia, and diplomas in international public law by the Paris-Sorbonne University and in international relations by the London School of Economics. He joined the diplomatic corps in 1987 and his first job was as Director-Chief for Central America within the Directorate-General of Foreign Policy for Ibero-America.

Navarro has been deployed abroad in the Spanish diplomatic posts in Damascus—second chief of mission—, Copenhagen and Brasilia, and in August 2011 he obtained his first job as head of mission, when he was appointed Ambassador to the Czech Republic, working in Prague until November 2014.

He also has experience in the central services of the Ministry of Foreign Affairs. In this capacity, he served as Head of the Immigration, Refugees and Passports Area of the Directorate-General for Legal and Consular Affairs, as Deputy Director-General for Cooperation with Mexico, Central America and the Caribbean at the Spanish Agency for International Development Cooperation (2005–2008), as Deputy Director-General for International Terrorism Affairs at the Directorate-General for Security, Disarmament and Terrorism (2008) and as Chief of Staff to Secretary of State Diego López Garrido (2008–2011).

In July 2017, once again at the Secretariat of State for the European Union, he was appointed Director-General for Coordination of the Internal Market and Other Community Policies, serving until September 2021.

In September 2021, Minister Albares re-established the General Secretariat for the European Union to assist the Secretary of State in his duties, since it was foreseen that the 2023 Spanish Presidency of the Council of the European Union would entail an increased workload. Pascual Navarro was then appointed Secretary-General. His good work in the negotiations with the United Kingdom on the post-Brexit status of Gibraltar and his European experience led to his promotion in December 2021 to EU Secretary of State, being the person ultimately responsible for the organization and proper functioning of the Spanish presidency.

In February 2024, he was appointed Ambassador to Germany.
