= List of ambassadors of Spain to Romania =

Ambassador of Spain to Romania
- Coat of arms of Spain
- Incumbent; José Antonio Hernández Pérez-Solorzano since 7 September 2022
- Ministry of Foreign Affairs; Secretariat of State for the European Union
- Style: The Most Excellent
- Residence: Bucharest
- Nominator: The Foreign Minister
- Appointer: The Monarch
- Term length: At the government's pleasure
- Inaugural holder: José Carlos González-Campo Dal-Re
- Formation: 1977
- Website: Mission of Spain to Romania

The ambassador of Spain to Romania is the official representative of the Kingdom of Spain to the Republic of Romania. It is also accredited to the Republic of Moldova.

Spain recognized Romania's independence from the Ottoman Empire on 12 April 1880 and the following year both countries established diplomatic relations. Relations were interrupted in 1947, following the abdication of King Michael I, and re-established in 1977, with the status of embassy.

== Jurisdiction ==
- Romania: The Embassy of Spain in Bucharest is responsible for diplomatic relations with Romania and Moldova, and its Consular Section provides consular services to both nations. In addition, Spain has honorary consulates in Cluj-Napoca and Timișoara.

The ambassador is also accredited to:

- Moldova: Both countries established diplomatic relations on 31 January 1992. Initially, relations between Moldova and Spain were handled through the Embassy in Moscow, but since 1998 they have been the responsibility of Bucharest. Spain has a chargé d'affaires and an honorary consul in Chișinău.

== List of ambassadors ==
This list was compiled using the work "History of the Spanish Diplomacy" by the Spanish historian and diplomat Miguel Ángel Ochoa Brun. The work covers up to the year 2000, so the rest is based on appointments published in the Boletín Oficial del Estado.

Name	Rank	Term
Juan Pedro Aladro Kastriota	Chargé d'affaires	1881–1883
Miguel Bertodano y Pattison; Marquess of Moral	Minister	1884–1889
Adriano Rotondo Nicolau	Chargé d'affaires	1889–1900
Joaquín Carsi y Rivera	Chargé d'affaires	1901–1907
Rafael Casares y Gil	Chargé d'affaires	1907–1908
Romeo Jaime de Baguer y Corsi	Chargé d'affaires	1909–1910
Manuel Multedo y Cortina	Minister	1910–1918
Rafael Mitjana y Gordón	Minister	1918–1919
Silvio Fernández-Vallín y Alfonso	Minister	1919
Antonio de Zayas y Beaumont; Duke of Amalfi	Minister	1919–1924
Francisco Serrat y Bonastre	Minister	1924–1926
Fernando Gómez Contreras	Chargé d'affaires	1924–1926
Juan Francisco de Cárdenas	Minister	1926–1930
Pablo de Churruca y Dotres; Marquess of Aycinena	Minister	1930–1931
Miguel Ángel de Muguiro	Minister	1931–1932
Pedro Prat y Soutzo	Minister	1932–1940
Agustín de Foxá	Chargé d'affaires	1936–1937
Manuel López del Rey	Chargé d'affaires	1936–1939
Josep Carner (Note: Representing the Republican Government.)	Envoy	1937–1939
José Felipe de Alcover y Sureda (Note: Representing the Rebel Government.)	Envoy	1936–1939
Alfonso Merry del Val; Marquess of Merry del Val	Chargé d'affaires	1940
José Rojas Moreno; Marquess of Bosch de Arés	Minister	1940–1943
Manuel Gómez y García-Barzanallana	Minister	1943–1946
Ricardo Giménez-Arnau	Head of Mission-Consular and Trade Representative	1967–1970
Eduardo Casuso Gandarillas	Head of Mission-Consular and Trade Representative	1970–1973
Pío de los Casares y de Illana	Head of Mission-Consular and Trade Representative	1973–1974
José Carlos González-Campo Dal-Re	Head of Mission-Consular and Trade Representative	1975–1977
José Carlos González-Campo Dal-Re	Ambassador	1977–1981
José María Álvarez de Sotomayor y Castro	Ambassador	1981–1986
Nicolás Revenga Domínguez	Ambassador	1986–1988
Antonio Núñez García-Saúco	Ambassador	1988–1992
Antonio Ortiz García	Ambassador	1992–1996
Antonio Bellver Manrique (Note: Accredited to Moldova)	Ambassador	1996–2001
Jesús Atienza Serna	Ambassador	2001–2005
Juan Pablo García-Berdoy	Ambassador	2005–2009
Estanislao de Grandes	Ambassador	2009–2013
Ramiro Fernández Bachiller	Ambassador	2014–2018
Manuel Larrotcha Parada	Ambassador	2018–2022
José Antonio Hernández Pérez-Solorzano	Ambassador	2022–pres.

== See also ==
- Romania–Spain relations
- Moldova–Spain relations
