= List of ambassadors of Spain to Slovakia =

Ambassador of Spain to Slovakia
- Coat of arms of Spain
- Incumbent; Sofía Ruiz del Árbol since 18 June 2025
- Ministry of Foreign Affairs; Secretariat of State for the European Union
- Style: The Most Excellent
- Residence: Bratislava
- Nominator: The Foreign Minister
- Appointer: The Monarch
- Term length: At the government's pleasure
- Inaugural holder: Roberto Bermúdez Ruiz
- Formation: 1993
- Website: Mission of Spain to Slovakia

The ambassador of Spain to Slovakia is the official representative of the Kingdom of Spain to the Slovak Republic.

When the First Slovak Republic, a Nazi Germany client state was established in 1939, the first government of Francisco Franco recognized it and established diplomatic relations with it. Decades later, when the Czech and Slovak Federative Republic was dissolved in 1992, Spain recognized the new states and the ambassador in Prague assumed the diplomatic representation before both nations. In 1997, Spain established an independent Embassy in Bratislava.

== Lists of ambassadors ==
This list was compiled using the work "History of the Spanish Diplomacy" by the Spanish historian and diplomat Miguel Ángel Ochoa Brun. The work covers up to the year 2000, so the rest is based on appointments published in the Boletín Oficial del Estado.

=== List of ambassadors to the First Slovak Republic (1939–1945) ===
| Name | Rank | Term |
|---|---|---|
| Carlos Arco y Cuadra | Chargé d'affaires | 1939–1940 |
| Juan Manuel Caro y Trueba | Minister | 1940–1945 |

=== List of ambassadors to Slovakia (since 1993) ===
| Name | Rank | Term |
|---|---|---|
| The Ambassador to the Czech Republic | | 1993–1997 |
| Estanislao de Grandes | Ambassador | 1997–2002 |
| Alfonso Díez Torres | Ambassador | 2002–2005 |
| Miguel Aguirre de Cárcer y García del Arenal | Ambassador | 2005–2008 |
| José Ángel López Jorrin | Ambassador | 2008–2012 |
| Félix Valdés y Valentín-Gamazo | Ambassador | 2012–2017 |
| Luis Belzuz | Ambassador | 2017–2021 |
| Lorea Arribalzaga Ceballos | Ambassador | 2021–2025 |
| Sofía Ruiz del Árbol | Ambassador | 2025–pres. |

== See also ==
- Slovakia–Spain relations
