= List of ambassadors of Spain to Albania =

Ambassador of Spain to Albania
- Coat of arms of Spain
- Incumbent; Gabriel Cremades Ventura since 5 March 2025
- Ministry of Foreign Affairs; Secretariat of State for the European Union
- Style: The Most Excellent
- Residence: Tirana
- Nominator: The Foreign Minister
- Appointer: The Monarch
- Term length: At the government's pleasure
- Formation: 1986
- Website: Mission of Spain to Albania

The ambassador of Spain to Albania is the official representative of the Kingdom of Spain to the Republic of Albania.

Spain had a chargé d'affaires in the Kingdom of Albania from 1929 to 1939, and the ambassador to Italy assumed the representation during the Italian protectorate. After decades without relations, they were reestablished in 1986, with the category of ambassador; however, the ambassador was resident in Belgrade from 1986 to 1992 and in Rome from 1993 to 2006, when a resident embassy was established.

== List of envoys (1929–1939) ==
Name	Term	Rank	Nominated by	Appointed by
Enrique Carlos de la Casa y García-Calamarte	1929–1931	Chargé d'affaires / Consul	The Marquess of Estella	Alfonso XIII
Adolfo Pérez-Caballero y Moltó	1931–1936	Chargé d'affaires / Consul	Alejandro Lerroux	Niceto Alcalá-Zamora
Manuel Travesedo y Silvela	1937–1939	Minister / Consul General	Francisco Franco	

== List of ambassadors (since 1986) ==
Ambassador		Term	Nominated by	Appointed by	Accredited to
1	Luis Cuervo Fábrega (Note: Resident in Belgrade.)	2 December 1986 – 23 January 1991 (4 years, 52 days)	Francisco Fernández Ordóñez	Juan Carlos I	Ramiz Alia
2	José Manuel Allendesalazar Valdés	23 January 1991 – 26 September 1992 (1 year, 247 days)	Francisco Fernández Ordóñez	Juan Carlos I	Ramiz Alia
3	Emilio Menéndez (Note: Resident in Rome.)	4 January 1993 – 3 May 1994 (1 year, 119 days)	Javier Solana	Juan Carlos I	Sali Berisha
4	Mercedes Rico	10 December 1994 – 2 September 1996 (1 year, 267 days)	Javier Solana	Juan Carlos I	Sali Berisha
5	Juan Prat y Coll	8 February 1997 – 3 June 2000 (3 years, 116 days)	Abel Matutes	Juan Carlos I	Sali Berisha
6	José de Carvajal Salido	30 September 2000 – 24 December 2004 (4 years, 85 days)	Josep Piqué	Juan Carlos I	Rexhep Meidani
7	José Luis Dicenta	1 April 2005 – 10 June 2006 (1 year, 70 days)	Miguel Ángel Moratinos	Juan Carlos I	Alfred Moisiu
8	Manuel Montobbio de Balanzó	10 June 2006 – 16 November 2010 (4 years, 159 days)	Miguel Ángel Moratinos	Juan Carlos I	Alfred Moisiu
9	Rafael Tormo Pérez	16 November 2010 – 17 May 2014 (3 years, 182 days)	Trinidad Jiménez	Juan Carlos I	Bamir Topi
10	Silvia Josefina Cortés Martín	17 May 2014 – 23 May 2017 (3 years, 6 days)	José Manuel García-Margallo	Juan Carlos I	Bujar Nishani
11	Vicente Canelles Montero	23 May 2017 – 23 September 2020 (3 years, 123 days)	Alfonso Dastis	Felipe VI	Bujar Nishani
12	Marcos Alonso Alonso	23 September 2020 – 21 July 2021 (301 days)	Arancha González Laya	Felipe VI	Ilir Meta
13	Álvaro Renedo Zalba	17 November 2021 – 5 March 2025 (3 years, 108 days)	José Manuel Albares	Felipe VI	Ilir Meta
14	Gabriel Cremades Ventura	5 March 2025 – present (1 year, 186 days)	José Manuel Albares	Felipe VI	Bajram Begaj

== See also ==
- Spain–Albania relations
