= Teresa Agustin =

Spanish writer, poet

Teresa Agustín (Teruel, 1962) is a Spanish writer, poet, journalist, lecturer and philologist.

== Biography ==
She has a degree in Philosophy and Literature. Agustin is head of the press department of the Fundación Mujeres in Madrid and was responsible for communications at the Fundación Alternativas.

She has worked as an editor, journalist and communications director for various publications such as La república de las ideas, Turia, En pie de paz, Andalán, Le monde diplomatique, Human Rights and Público.

She is a translator of Marguerite Duras and several texts related to feminist theory. Her work has appeared in the anthologies Penúltimos poetas en Aragón (Penultimate Poets in Aragon, 1989), Ellas tienen la palabra (They Have the Word 1997), Mujeres de carne y verso (Women of Flesh and Verse) Antología poética femenina del siglo XX (2002), Yin. Poetas aragonesas 1960-2010 (2010).Antología poética aragonesa-húngara.

In 2016 she was honoured for her career at the tenth edition of the Marzo Poetic March, an event organised by the City Council of Fraga. She is considered one of the most representative figures of contemporary literature.

== Works ==
- Dhuoda (Poetry, 1986. Labati).
- Cartas para una mujer (Letters to a woman 1993. Prensas Universitarias de Zaragoza).
- La tela que tiembla (Poetry, 1998. Olifante).
- Hombre en un jardín con lirios, lilas y dos amapolas (Man in a garden with lilies, lilacs and two poppies, Poetry 2003. Prames). ISBN 9788495116529.
- Dos pasillos (Two corridors , 2008. Poetry Huerga & Fierro). ISBN 9788483747049..
- Lantanas. Los poemas azules (Poetry, 2015. Huerga & Fierro). ISBN 9788494403248..
- Caolín y rojo (Poetry, 2018. The Grotto of Words). ISBN 9788417358341..
- La belleza y la nube (Poetry, 2022. Huerga & Fierro). ISBN 9788412574548.
