= Marcos Alonso Alonso =

Spanish diplomat

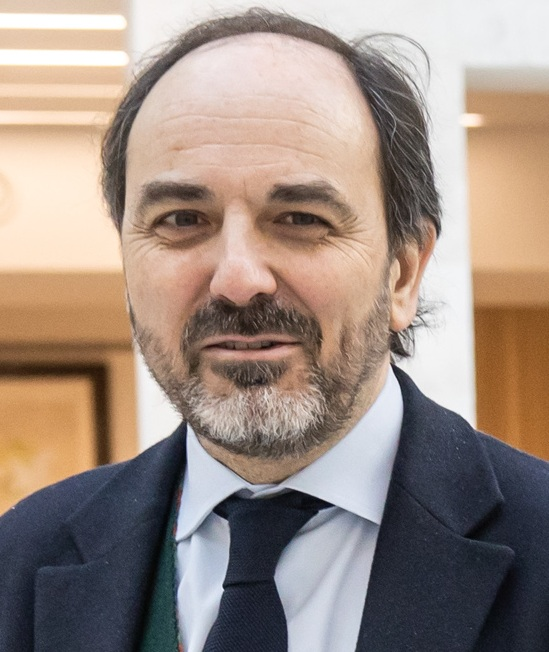

Ambassador Permanent Representative of Spain to the European Union
- Incumbent
- Assumed office July 21, 2021
- Preceded by: Juan Pablo García-Berdoy

Ambassador of Spain to Albania
- In office September 23, 2020 – July 21, 2021
- Preceded by: Vicente Canelles Montero
- Succeeded by: Álvaro Renedo Zalba

Director of the Department for European Affairs and G20
- In office June 23, 2018 – January 28, 2020
- Preceded by: Office established
- Succeeded by: María Aurora Mejía Errasquín

Personal details
- Born: 1970 (age 55–56) Gijón, Spain

Marcos Alonso Alonso (born in 1970) is a Spanish diplomat who currently serves as Ambassador Permanent Representative of Spain to the European Union since 2021.

== Career ==
Alonso was born in Gijón, Asturias, in 1970. He graduated in law by the University of Oviedo and in Politics by the University of Toulouse. He also completed a NATO Defense College course for generals, officers and ambassadors. He joined the diplomatic career in 1999, and his first assignment was the Technical Cabinet of the Under-Secretary of Foreign Affairs.

As a diplomat, Alonso has been posted in the Spanish missions to the European Union, NATO, Council of Europe and the United Nations. He has also served as consul in Havana and has been attached, as national expert, to the Secretariat of the European Parliament Committee on Foreign Affairs. At the central services of the Foreign Ministry, Alonso has served as Deputy Director-General for Foreign Relations and Trade Affairs of the European Union and as Assistant Deputy Director-General for Justice and Interior Affairs of the European Union.

In June 2018, prime minister Pedro Sánchez appointed him as advisor in his cabinet, responsible for the Department for European Affairs and G20. He served in that position until January 2020.

In September 2020, he was appointed as Ambassador of Spain to Albania and, in July 2021, he was assigned to the Spanish Representation to the European Union as Ambassador Permanent Representative (Head of Mission). During his term, he coordinated the works of the 2023 Spanish Presidency of the Council of the European Union.

In July 2025, he was made commander by number of the Order of Isabella the Catholic—with other Ministry's officials—in recognition of his efforts to reach an agreement on Gibraltar's future relationship with Spain and the European Union.
