= Fernando Sampedro =

Spanish politician (born 1979)

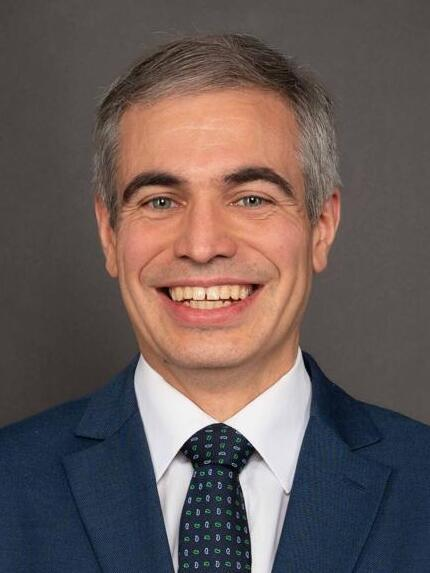
- Sampedro in 2026

Secretary of State for the European Union
- Incumbent
- Assumed office 19 December 2023
- Preceded by: Pascual Navarro Ríos

Personal details
- Born: 1979 (age 46–47)

Fernando Mariano Sampedro Marcos (Palencia, 1979) has been Secretary of State for the European Union since his appointment by the Council of Ministers in December 2023, as well as a European civil servant.

== Biography ==
Born in Palencia, he comes from a family with roots in the Palencian towns of Antigüedad de Cerrato and Herrera de Pisuerga. In his youth, he carried out voluntary work and participated in student and social movements in Palencia, collaborating with youth organisations. He was also Secretary-General of the Socialist Youth of Palencia between 2004 and 2006.

Sampedro Marcos holds a degree in Market Research and Techniques and a diploma in Business Studies from the University of Valladolid, where he received the Final Degree Award and a runner-up prize in the Arquímedes National Research Award, one of the most prominent university research recognitions for young researchers in Spain. He completed a master's degree in International Management at the Centre for Economic and Commercial Studies (CECO). During his university years, he had a prominent institutional role: he was a member of the University Senate and the Governing Council of the University of Valladolid, as well as student representative of the Faculty of Economics and Business and the University School of Business Studies. He also won two awards in the National University Debate League.

He has also completed specialised courses at various institutions, including the European Commission (International Negotiations), the European External Action Service (European Diplomatic Programme), the Diplomatic School (Election Observation) and CECO (International Organisations), as well as training programmes abroad on Development (London School of Economics, United Kingdom), International Economics (University of Skövde, Sweden) and International Business (London Guildhall University, United Kingdom).

With more than twenty years of experience in European and international affairs, between 2003 and 2009 he worked at the Economic and Commercial Offices of the Embassies of Spain in Denmark and Chile. He also worked at the Territorial Directorates for Economy and Trade of La Rioja and Castile and León.

Between 2009 and 2013, he was an adviser on foreign affairs at the European Parliament, and in 2013 he joined the Secretariat-General of the European Commission as a career civil servant, within the Strategic Foreign Policy Unit, participating in the preparation of international summits such as the G7 and G20. In 2019, he became a member of the cabinet of the President of the European Commission, Ursula von der Leyen.

His appointment as Secretary of State for the European Union was formalised by Royal Decree 1145/2023, published in the Official State Gazette on 22 December 2023. Since then, he has held this position at the Ministry of Foreign Affairs, European Union and Cooperation.

== Decorations ==
In recognition of his participation in the negotiations for the Agreement between the European Union (EU) and the United Kingdom (UK) in respect of Gibraltar, Minister José Manuel Albares awarded him the Encomienda of the Order of Isabella the Catholic.
