= Democratic and Social Centre (Spain) =

Democratic and Social Centre Centro Democrático y Social
- Founder: Adolfo Suárez
- Founded: 29 July 1982
- Dissolved: c. 2012
- Split from: Union of the Democratic Centre
- Merged into: People's Party (majority)
- Headquarters: Madrid
- Youth wing: Democratic and Social Centre Youth.
- Ideology: Centrism; Liberalism; Christian democracy
- Political position: Centre
- European Parliament group: Liberal Democratic and Reformist (1987–1994)
- International affiliation: Liberal International
- Colours: Green, white

Democratic and Social Centre (Spanish: Centro Democrático y Social, CDS) was a liberal political party in Spain, founded in 1982 by former prime minister Adolfo Suárez. The party was a member of the Liberal Democratic and Reformist Group in the European Parliament and the Liberal International. In 2006, most of its remaining members merged into the People's Party, though a reduced faction continued the party, which won some seats in the 2007 local elections.

== History ==
CDS was founded on 29 July 1982 by Adolfo Suárez, who had been the principal architect of the transition to a democratic system after the death of Francisco Franco and served as Prime Minister of Spain from 1976 to 1981. The followers of CDS claimed that their party was the inheritor of the political legacy of the Union of the Democratic Centre (UCD).

After resigning both as Prime Minister and party president of the UCD in January 1981, Suarez continued to struggle for control of the party machine. When he failed in his bid to regain party leadership in July 1982, he abandoned the party he had created and formed the CDS. The new centrist party fared poorly in the October general elections, gaining only two parliamentary seats.

By 1986, the party's fortunes had improved dramatically under the leadership of the former Prime Minister. In the June elections, the CDS more than tripled its share of the vote, which was 9.2 percent in 1986, compared with 2.9 percent in 1982, indicating that many who had previously voted for the UCD had transferred their support to the CDS. In the electoral campaign, Suarez had focused on his own experience as head of the government; he had criticised the Spanish Socialist Workers' Party (PSOE) for not fulfilling its 1982 election promises, had advocated a more independent foreign policy, and had called for economic measures that would improve the lot of the poor. This strategy enabled him to draw some votes from those who had become disillusioned with the PSOE.

In the municipal and the regional elections held in June 1987, the largest gains were made by the CDS. A poll taken at the end of 1987 revealed even stronger support for the party, and it gave Suarez a popularity rating equal to that of Gonzalez. Suarez's call for less dependence on the United States appealed to the latent anti-Americanism in the populace, and his advocacy of a greater role for the state in providing social services and in ensuring a more equitable distribution of income struck a responsive chord among the workers, who were growing increasingly impatient with Gonzalez's economic policies, which some perceived as more conservative than expected.

Starting in 1988, the party was a member of the Liberal International (LI). Suarez was the LI's president from 1988 to 1991. On March 25, 1995, the Centrist Union (UC) was born as a federation consisting of the CDS and some liberal and green groups. Subsequently, from November 1995, the party was called UC-CDS. In October 2002, the party reverted to its original name, CDS. A party congress held in 2005 decided, under the presidency of Teresa Gómez-Limón, to merge with the conservative People's Party (PP). At that point, CDS had 54 municipal councillors and around 3,000 members. The merger of CDS with the PP took place on 18 February 2006.

=== Revived party ===
A minority faction refused to accept the merger with the PP. They were headed by the "suarista", Fabian Villalabeitia Copena and Carlos Fernandez García. They organised an extraordinary Congress, following all the steps that were needed in the Bylaws of the CDS, obtaining almost the ownership of the same ones and appearing in almost all the provinces of Spain. At that congress Villalabeitia was elected speaker with the purpose of presiding over a Congress to select a national president. Before they had met in Logroño, members of the executive committee and the Federal committee had disagreed over the merger with the PP. Initially this group called itself the Liberal Democratic Centre (Centro Democrático Liberal). However, in 2007, following a judicial review, they obtained the right to use the CDS name. In the 2007 local elections, the party received 14,000 votes and won 38 council seats. The continuing party has a youth wing, the Democratic and Social Center Youth. The principal objectives of the organisation are increasing youth participation in political, economic, and social life.

== Electoral performance ==
=== Cortes Generales ===
Cortes Generales
Election	Leading candidate	Congress			Senate			Gov.
Election	Leading candidate	Votes	%	Seats	Votes	%	Seats	Gov.
1982	Adolfo Suárez	604,309	2.9 (#6)	2 / 350	1,748,765	3.0 (#6)	0 / 208	No
1986	Adolfo Suárez	1,861,912	9.2 (#3)	19 / 350	4,537,464	8.2 (#3)	3 / 208	No
1989	Adolfo Suárez	1,617,716	7.9 (#4)	14 / 350	4,218,268	7.6 (#4)	1 / 208	No
1993	Rafael Calvo Ortega	414,740	1.8 (#5)	0 / 350	1,189,877	1.8 (#5)	0 / 208	—
1996	Fernando García Fructuoso	44,771	0.2 (#15)	0 / 350	129,432	0.2 (#14)	0 / 208	—
2000	Mario Conde	23,576	0.1 (#19)	0 / 350	65,024	0.1 (#20)	0 / 208	—
2004	Teresa Gómez-Limón	34,101	0.1 (#19)	0 / 350	92,564	0.1 (#16)	0 / 208	—
2008	Carlos Fernández García	1,362	0.0 (#60)	0 / 350	341	0.0 (#107)	0 / 208	—

=== European Parliament ===
European Parliament
Election	Leading candidate	Votes	%	Seats	EP Group
1987	Eduard Punset	1,976,093	10.3 (#3)	7 / 60	NI
1989	José Ramón Caso	1,133,429	7.1 (#3)	5 / 60	LDR
1994	Eduard Punset	183,418	1.0 (#7)	0 / 64	—
1999	José Manuel Novo	38,911	0.2 (#11)	0 / 64	—
2004	Teresa Gómez-Limón	11,820	0.1 (#11)	0 / 54	—
2009	Antonio Fidalgo	10,144	0.1 (#18)	0 / 54	—

=== Results timeline ===
Year	(Spain) ES	(European Union) EU	(Andalusia) AN	(Aragon) AR	(Asturias) AS	(Canary Islands) CN	(Cantabria) CB	(Castilla–La Mancha) CM	(Castile and León) CL	(Catalonia) CT	(Ceuta) CE	(Extremadura) EX	(Galicia (Spain)) GL	(Balearic Islands) IB	RI	(Community of Madrid) MD	(Melilla) ML	(Region of Murcia) MC	(Navarre) NC	(Basque Country (autonomous community)) PV	(Valencian Community) CV
1982	2.9	N/A	N/A	N/A	N/A	N/A	N/A	N/A	N/A	N/A	N/A	N/A	N/A	N/A	N/A	N/A	N/A	N/A	N/A	N/A	N/A
1983	2.9	N/A	N/A	3.3	3.5	7.2	2.6	3.0	6.0	N/A	N/A	0.8	N/A	2.1	2.4	3.1	N/A	1.1	N/A	N/A	1.9
1984	2.9	N/A	N/A	3.3	3.5	7.2	2.6	3.0	6.0	N/A	N/A	0.8	N/A	2.1	2.4	3.1	N/A	1.1	N/A	10.3	1.9
1985	2.9	N/A	N/A	3.3	3.5	7.2	2.6	3.0	6.0	N/A	N/A	0.8	3.3	2.1	2.4	3.1	N/A	1.1	N/A	10.3	1.9
1986	9.2	N/A	3.3	3.3	3.5	7.2	2.6	3.0	6.0	N/A	N/A	0.8	3.3	2.1	2.4	3.1	N/A	1.1	N/A	3.5	1.9
1987	9.2	10.3	3.3	10.2	18.5	19.5	6.6	10.5	19.4	N/A	N/A	12.3	3.3	10.2	10.8	16.6	N/A	11.9	7.4	3.5	11.2
1988	9.2	10.3	3.3	10.2	18.5		6.6	10.5	19.4	3.8	N/A	12.3	3.3	10.2	10.8	16.6	N/A	11.9	7.4	3.5	11.2
1989	7.9	7.1	3.3	10.2	18.5		6.6	10.5	19.4	3.8	N/A	12.3	2.9	10.2	10.8	16.6	N/A	11.9	7.4	3.5	11.2
1990	7.9	7.1	1.2	10.2	18.5			10.5	19.4	3.8	N/A	12.3	2.9	10.2	10.8	16.6	N/A	11.9	7.4	0.7	11.2
1991	7.9	7.1	1.2	3.1	6.7	14.4	2.7	3.5	8.1	3.8	N/A	5.7	2.9	2.9	4.4	3.3	N/A	5.0	2.1	0.7	3.8
1992	7.9	7.1	1.2	3.1	6.7	14.4	2.7	3.5	8.1	0.9	N/A	5.7	2.9	2.9	4.4	3.3	N/A	5.0	2.1	0.7	3.8
1993	1.8	7.1	1.2	3.1	6.7	14.4	2.7	3.5	8.1	0.9	N/A	5.7	N/A	2.9	4.4	3.3	N/A	5.0	2.1	0.7	3.8
1994	1.8	1.0	0.3	3.1	6.7	14.4	2.7	3.5	8.1	0.9	N/A	5.7	N/A	2.9	4.4	3.3	N/A	5.0	2.1	N/A	3.8
1995	1.8	1.0	0.3	N/A	1.8	0.7	0.4	0.4	N/A	N/A	N/A	N/A	N/A	N/A	N/A	N/A	N/A	0.7	N/A	N/A	0.2
1996	0.2	1.0	0.0	N/A	1.8	0.7	0.4	0.4	N/A	N/A	N/A	N/A	N/A	N/A	N/A	N/A	N/A	0.7	N/A	N/A	0.2
1997	0.2	1.0	0.0	N/A	1.8	0.7	0.4	0.4	N/A	N/A	N/A	N/A	N/A	N/A	N/A	N/A	N/A	0.7	N/A	N/A	0.2
1998	0.2	1.0	0.0	N/A	1.8	0.7	0.4	0.4	N/A	N/A	N/A	N/A	N/A	N/A	N/A	N/A	N/A	0.7	N/A	N/A	0.2
1999	0.2	0.2	0.0	N/A	0.1	0.5	0.5	0.3	0.7	0.0	N/A	N/A	N/A	N/A	N/A	0.3	N/A	0.3	N/A	N/A	0.1
2000	0.1	0.2	N/A	N/A	0.1	0.5	0.5	0.3	0.7	0.0	N/A	N/A	N/A	N/A	N/A	0.3	N/A	0.3	N/A	N/A	0.1
2001	0.1	0.2	N/A	N/A	0.1	0.5	0.5	0.3	0.7	0.0	N/A	N/A	N/A	N/A	N/A	0.3	N/A	0.3	N/A	N/A	0.1
2002	0.1	0.2	N/A	N/A	0.1	0.5	0.5	0.3	0.7	0.0	N/A	N/A	N/A	N/A	N/A	0.3	N/A	0.3	N/A	N/A	0.1
2003	0.1	0.2	N/A	N/A	0.1	0.0	0.2	N/A	0.2	0.0	N/A	N/A	N/A	N/A	N/A	0.2	N/A	0.0	N/A	N/A	0.1
2004	0.1	0.2	N/A	N/A	0.1	0.0	0.2	N/A	0.2	0.0	N/A	N/A	N/A	N/A	N/A	N/A	N/A	0.0	N/A	N/A	0.1
Year	(Spain) ES	(European Union) EU	(Andalusia) AN	(Aragon) AR	(Asturias) AS	(Canary Islands) CN	(Cantabria) CB	(Castilla–La Mancha) CM	(Castile and León) CL	(Catalonia) CT	(Ceuta) CE	(Extremadura) EX	(Galicia (Spain)) GL	(Balearic Islands) IB	RI	(Community of Madrid) MD	(Melilla) ML	(Region of Murcia) MC	(Navarre) NC	(Basque Country (autonomous community)) PV	(Valencian Community) CV
**Bold** indicates best result to date. To be decided Present in legislature (in opposition); Junior coalition partner Senior coalition partner

== See also ==
- Politics of Spain
- List of political parties in Spain
