= Carolina Punset =

Spanish politician

Carolina Punset MEP
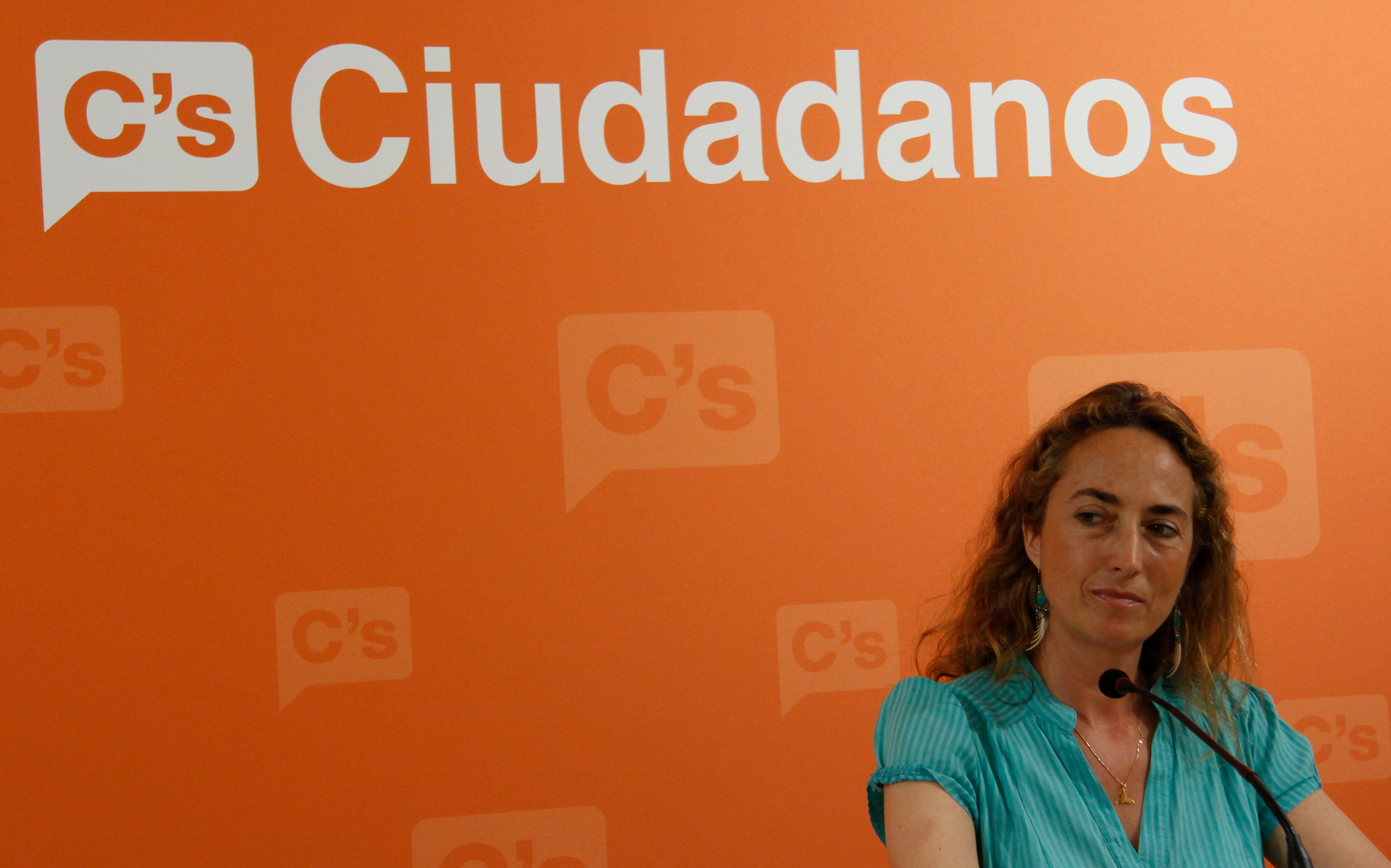

Member of the European Parliament
- In office 3 February 2016 – 2019
- Preceded by: Juan Carlos Girauta
- Constituency: Spain

Personal details
- Born: 5 January 1971 (age 55) Washington, D.C., United States
- Party: Citizens (2014-2018)
- Parent: Eduard Punset
- Occupation: Politician
- Website: www.carolinapunset.com

Carolina Punset Bannel (born 5 January 1971) is a Spanish politician, lawyer and forensic handwriting expert. She served as a Member of the European Parliament from 2016 until 2019. Punset has a post-graduate certificate in international development cooperation and non-governmental organizations.

Aside from her work as a lawyer and forensic handwriting expert, Punset has also developed her professional expertise in the field of non-governmental organizations such as ‘Proyecto Hombre’ (reintegration of drug addicts into society), Médecins sans Frontières/Doctors without Borders, the City of Joy Foundation in India, and others.

In 2007 she headed a local Green party in Altea, Alicante called 'Ciudadanos Independientes por Altea' [Independent Citizens for Altea] or CIPAL. She was Altea Town Councillor for urban planning, agriculture, health and public participation (Altea Town Council).

In September 2013 she joined the political association 'Movimiento Ciudadanos'. In the 2014 European elections, Carolina Punset won the primary elections and third place on the party lists. In February 2016 she succeeded Juan Carlos Girauta, who is now Ciudadanos' spokesperson in the lower house of the Spanish Parliament; as Member of the European Parliament (MEP).

Prior to that, Carolina Punset was a Member of the Valencian Regional Parliament and autonomous community spokesperson for 'Ciudadanos', a post she had held since the municipal and autonomous community elections in May 2015, having won the party's primary.

Punset was a member of the National Executive of 'Ciudadanos', responsible for the environmental agenda. In 2012, she stood as an independent Europe Écologie Les Verts candidate in the 5th constituency (French citizens resident in Spain, Portugal, Andorra and Monaco) in France's legislative elections.

On 20 October 2018 she announced she was leaving 'Ciudadanos', criticizing the leadership and citing a shift in the direction of the party.

== Other activities ==
Punset is the author of a book published in 2013: No importa de dónde vienes, sino adónde vas [Where you are going matters, not where you come from], in which she laid out her basic ideology as an ecologist.

== Recognition ==
- 2011 – Food and Agriculture Research and Technological Development Prize of the Valencian Regional Government for the ‘Residuo Cero’ [Zero Waste] project she undertook together with the Altea Farm Cooperative as Town Councillor for Agriculture
- Sustainable Municipality Prize of the Alicante Provincial Council for the Huertos Urbanos Ecológicos [Organic Urban Gardens] project she undertook as Town Councillor for Agriculture.
- 2009 – José Navarro Foundation Green Prizes as a person in a position of public responsibility for her contribution to ecology and smart food.
