= Emilio Menéndez =

Spanish politician

Emilio Menéndez del Valle (born 20 June 1945 in Madrid) is a Spanish politician and diplomat and Member of the European Parliament for the Spanish Socialist Workers' Party, part of the Party of European Socialists. He has served as Spanish ambassador to Jordan and to Italy (dually accredited to Albania).

Author of:

Angola. Imperialismo y Guerra Civil, Madrid, Akal Editor, 1976.
