= Santa Cruz Palace, Madrid =

Coordinates: 40.4146°N 3.7060°W

Santa Cruz Palace
- Palacio de Santa Cruz (Spanish)
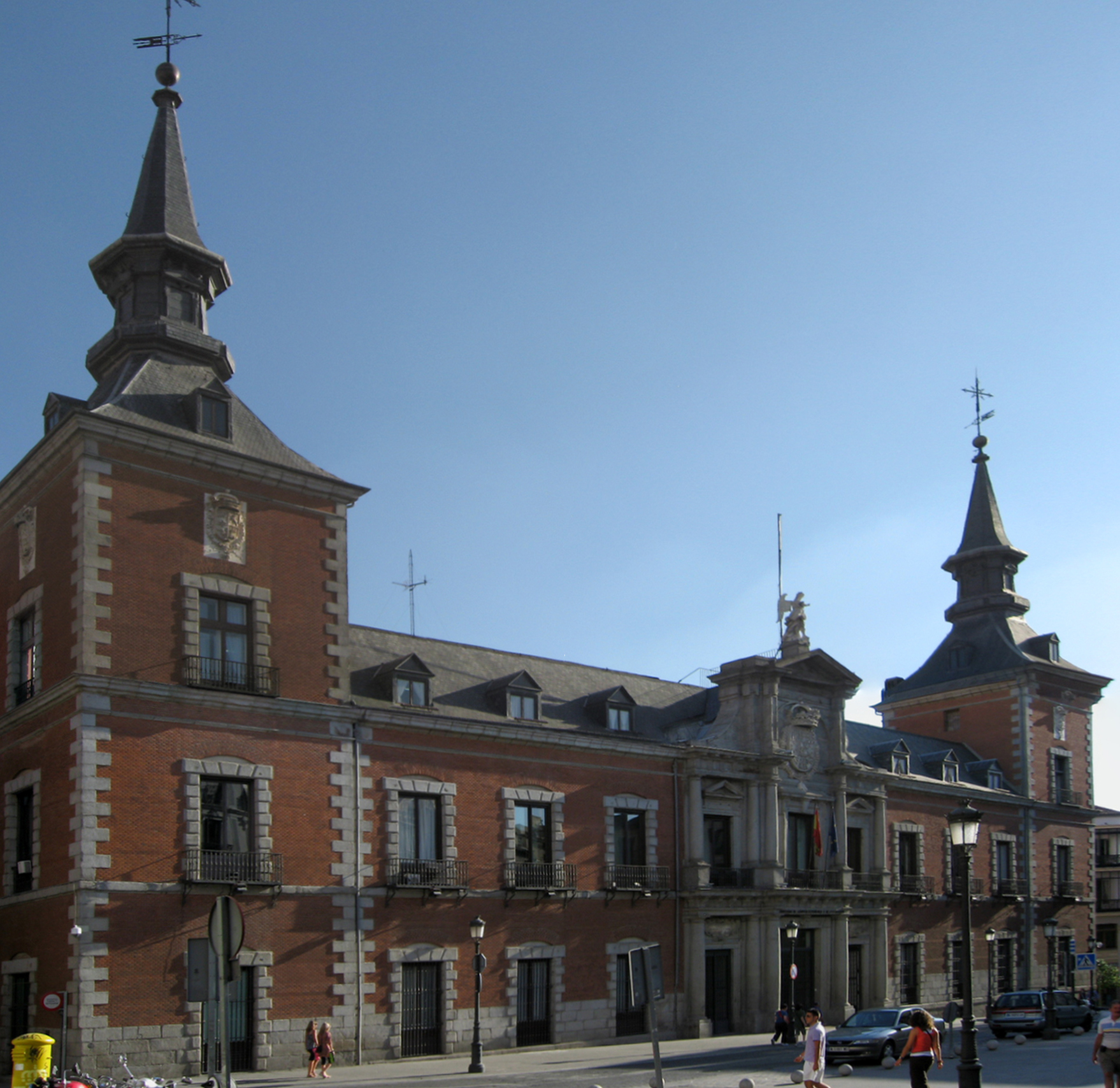

- Location within Spain
- Location: Madrid, Spain

Spanish Cultural Heritage
- Official name: Palacio de Santa Cruz
- Type: Non-movable
- Criteria: Monument
- Designated: 1996
- Reference no.: RI-51-0009563

The Palacio de Santa Cruz or Palace of the Holy Cross is a baroque building in central Madrid, Spain. It now houses the Spanish Foreign Ministry. It was used as a jail until the reign of Philip IV of Spain, when it was converted into a palace.

Construction was commissioned in 1629 by Philip IV to house both courts and jail facilities. The architect Juan Gómez de Mora worked on it from 1629 to 1636, and later other architects like José de Villareal, Bartolomé Hurtado García, and José del Olmo added elements.

In 1767 it changed from jail to the Palacio de Santa Cruz, due to its proximity to the church of Santa Cruz. A fire destroyed all but the facade in 1791.

== Sources ==
- History of the Palacio de Santa Cruz by Ministerio de Asuntos Exteriores
- Palacio de Santa Cruz. Entrada de Madrid Histórico
