= Eduard Punset =

Spanish politician, lawyer and economist

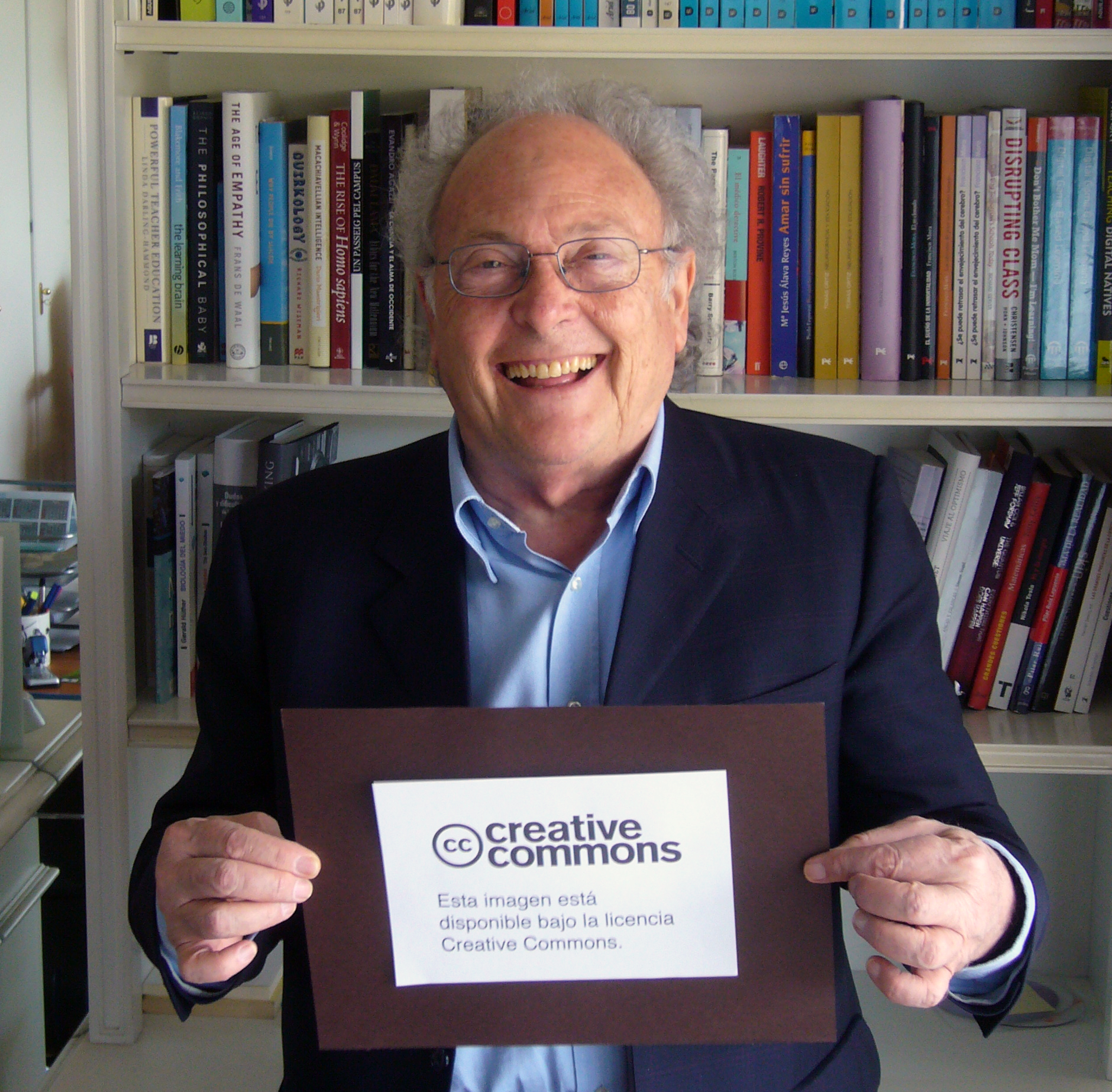

Minister for Relations with the European Communities
- In office 9 September 1980 – 27 February 1981
- Prime Minister: Adolfo Suárez
- Preceded by: Leopoldo Calvo-Sotelo
- Succeeded by: Office abolished

Catalan Minister of Economy and Finance
- In office 19 September 1978 – 8 May 1980
- President: Josep Tarradellas
- Preceded by: Joan Josep Folchi
- Succeeded by: Ramón Trías

Member of the European Parliament for Spain
- In office 6 July 1987 – 18 July 1994

Member of the Congress of Deputies for Barcelona
- In office 28 October 1982 – 5 December 1983

Personal details
- Born: 9 November 1936 Barcelona, Spain
- Died: 22 May 2019 (aged 82) Barcelona, Spain
- Party: PCE (1950s–1960s); UCD (1978–1981); CiU (1982–1983); CDS (1985–1991); Foro (1991–1995)
- Education: University of London; Complutense University of Madrid

Eduard Punset i Casals (Catalan: [əðuˈaɾt punˈsɛt]; 9 November 1936 – 22 May 2019) was a Spanish politician, lawyer, economist, and science popularizer.

== Education and career ==
He held a degree in Law from the Universidad Complutense de Madrid and a Master's in Economic Sciences from the University of London. He was an economic writer for the BBC, economics director of the Latin American edition of the newsweekly The Economist, and an economist for the International Monetary Fund in the United States and Haiti. As a specialist on the impact of emerging technologies, Punset was a consultant to COTEC, Advising Professor of International Marketing at ESADE, president of the Instituto Tecnológico Bull, Professor of Innovation and Technology at the IE Business School (formerly Instituto de Empresa) in Madrid, President of ENHER, Deputy General Director of Economic and Financial Studies at the Banco Hispanoamericano, and Coordinator of the Strategic Plan for the Information Society of the Government of Catalonia.

=== Political career ===
Punset started his political career in the Regional Government of Catalonia as Minister of Finance from 1978 to 1980, taking part in the implementation of the State of the Autonomies in Spain. He was a member of Adolfo Suárez's Union of the Democratic Centre, with which party he won a seat in the regional parliament in 1980 and in 1980-81 was appointed Minister for Relations with the European Communities in the Government of Spain from 1980 to 1981.

He was elected to the Spanish Congress in 1982 as an independent in the list of Convergence and Union (Catalan nationalist coalition) for Barcelona province, but he resigned the next year. When Spain joined the European Union, Punset was elected to the European Parliament as a member of Adolfo Suárez's Democratic and Social Centre (CDS) in 1987 and 1989. Punset quit CDS in 1991, following Suárez's resignment, but remained an EP member until 1994. As president of the European Parliament's delegation to Poland, he supervised part of the process of economic transformation undertaken in Eastern countries after the fall of the Berlin Wall.

=== Author and professor ===
Punset was author of several books on economic analysis and social thought. He was also Professor of Science, Technology, and Society at the Faculty of Economics of the Chemical Institute of Sarrià (Ramon Llull University). Since 1996, he directed and presented Redes [linked page in Spanish], a science programme based around interviews with leading scientists, aired on the TVE. He was also the president of the audiovisual production company smartplanet [linked page in Spanish] and board member of Sol Meliá Hotels & Resorts.

== Personal ==
Punset was diagnosed with lung cancer in November 2007, from which he recovered. Punset died on 22 May 2019 after succumbing to a lengthy illness aged 82. He was the father of politician Carolina Punset, writer and science popularizer Elsa Punset and Nadia.

== Awards ==
- "Honor Plaque" awarded by the Asociación Española de Científicos (Spanish Association of Scientists) (2001).
- Airtel Prize for Journalism awarded by the Fundación Vodafone (2002).
- "José Manuel Porquet" Prize for Digital Journalism (2006).
- "Galardón de la Psicología" awarded by the Colegio Oficial de Psicólogos de la Región de Murcia (Official College of Psychologists, Murcia) (2007).
- "Rei Jaume I" Prize for Journalism awarded by the Government of Valencia (2007).
- Science and Technology Prize awarded by AEEPP, Asociación Española de Editoriales de Publicaciones Periódicas (Spanish Association of Publishers of Periodicals) (2008).
- Manel Xifra i Boada Prize awarded by the Col·legi d'Enginyers Tècnics Industrials de Girona (Official College of Industrial Engineers, Girona) (2008).
- "Asociación Profesional Española de Informadores de prensa, radio y televisión: APEI-Catalunya" (Spanish Association of Press, Television and Radio Reporters, Catalonia) Prize (2008).
- "Hombre CQ del Año" Prize for the Best Writer (2008).
- "Mención de honor" (Honorary Mention) by the Sociedad Española de Neurología (Spanish Neurology Society) (2008).
- "Premios Zapping: Premio Humano" awarded by TVE (2009).
- "10 Most Influential Ibero American Intellectuals" of the year – Foreign Policy magazine (2012).

== Selected works ==
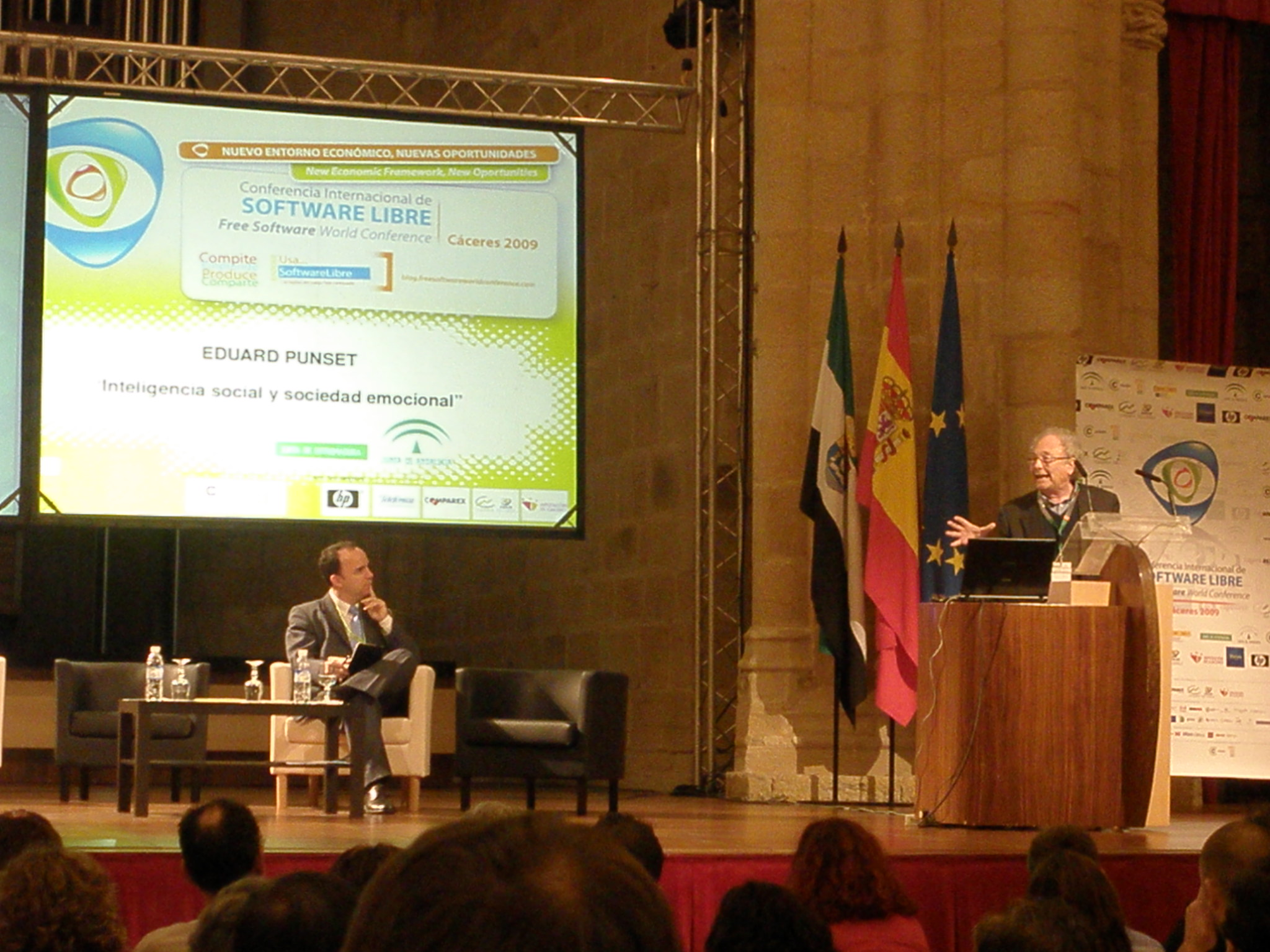
Punset conference

- El viaje a la felicidad: Las nuevas claves científicas (The Journey to Happiness: New Scientific Clues, 2005; English translation to be published in the United States in 2007 as The Happiness Trip: A Scientific Journey)
- Cara a cara con la vida, la mente y el universo (Face to Face with Life, Mind, and the Universe, 2004; English translation to be published in the United States in 2007 as Mind, Life and Universe: Conversations with Great Scientists of Our Time)
- Adaptarse a la marea. La selección natural en los negocios (Adapting to the Tide: Natural Selection in Business, 2004)
- Manual para sobrevivir en el siglo XXI (A 20th Century Survival Manual, 2000)
- Information Resources and Corporate Growth (coauthor, 1989)
- La España impertinente (Impertinent Spain, 1986)
- España: sociedad cerrada, sociedad abierta (Spain: Closed Society, Open Society, 1982)
- La salida de la crisis (The Way Out of the Crisis, 1980)
