= Estanislao de Grandes =

Spanish diplomat (1947–2022)

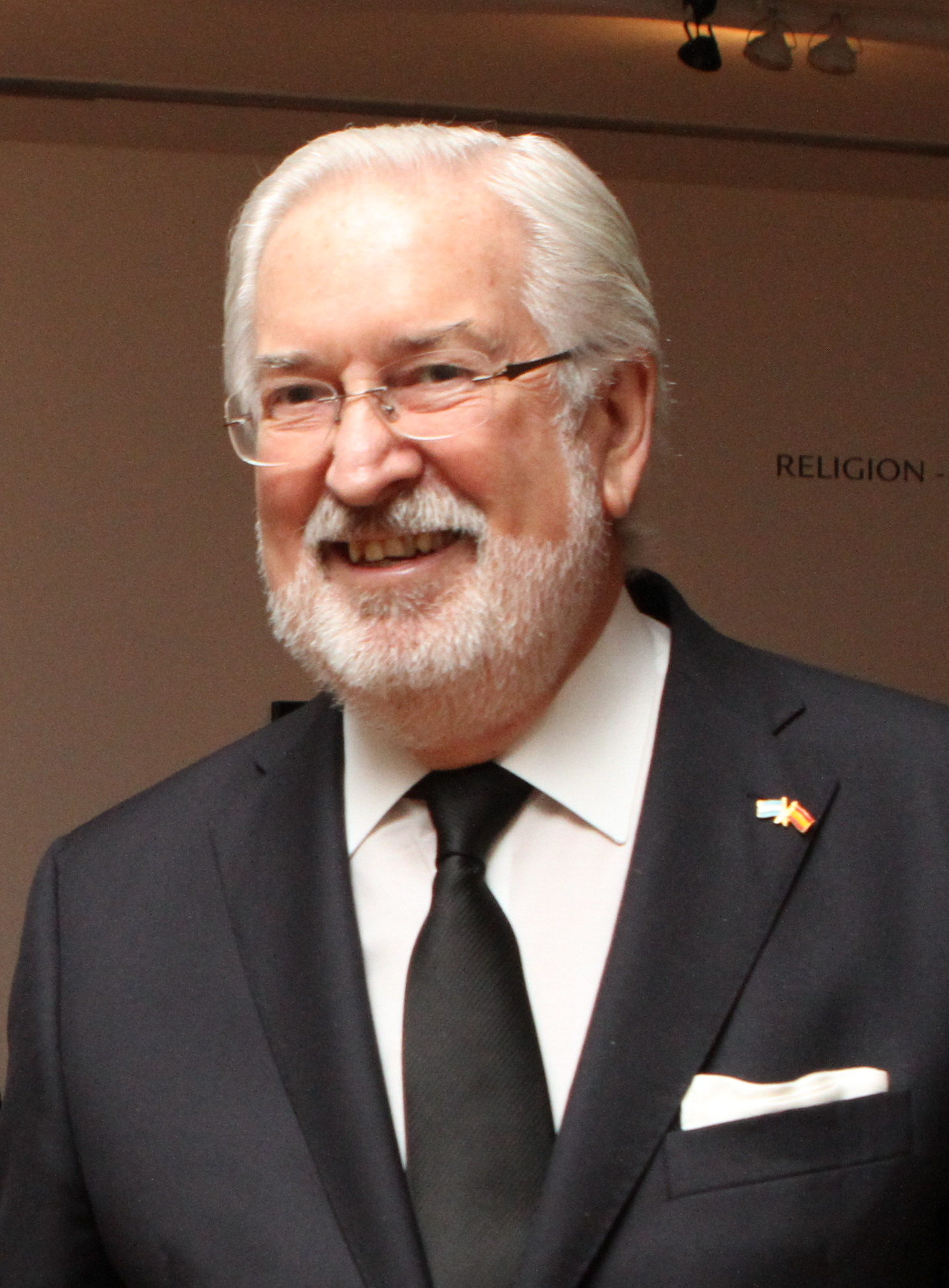
- Estanislao de Grandes in 2014
- Born: June 6, 1947; Guadalajara, Spain
- Died: February 25, 2022 (aged 74); Madrid, Spain
- Occupation: Diplomat
- Years active: 1997-2017
- Title: Ambassador of Spain to Slovakia (1997-2002) Permanent Representative of Spain to the Council of Europe (2002-2006); Ambassador of Spain to Romania (2009-2013); Ambassador of Spain to Moldova (2009-2013) Ambassador of Spain to Argentina (2013-2017)
- Awards: Grand Officer of the Order of the White Double Cross

Estanislao de Grandes Pascual (6 June 1947 – 25 February 2022) was a Spanish diplomat.

== Career ==
De Grandes was born in Guadalajara, Spain, on 6 June 1947 and joined the Diplomatic Corps in 1978.

In 1996, while in Chargé d'Affairs at the Spanish embassy in Peru, he was one of the 400 hostages during the Japanese embassy hostage crisis, being released two days later. He was Ambassador of Spain to Slovakia between 1997 and 2002, to Romania and Moldova between 2009 and 2013, and Permanent Representative of Spain to the Council of Europe between 2002 and 2006. His last destiny was as ambassador to Argentina, an office he held between 2013 and 2017.

De Grandes died from COVID-19 in Madrid on 25 February 2022, at the age of 74.
