= Diego López Garrido =

Spanish politician (born 1947)

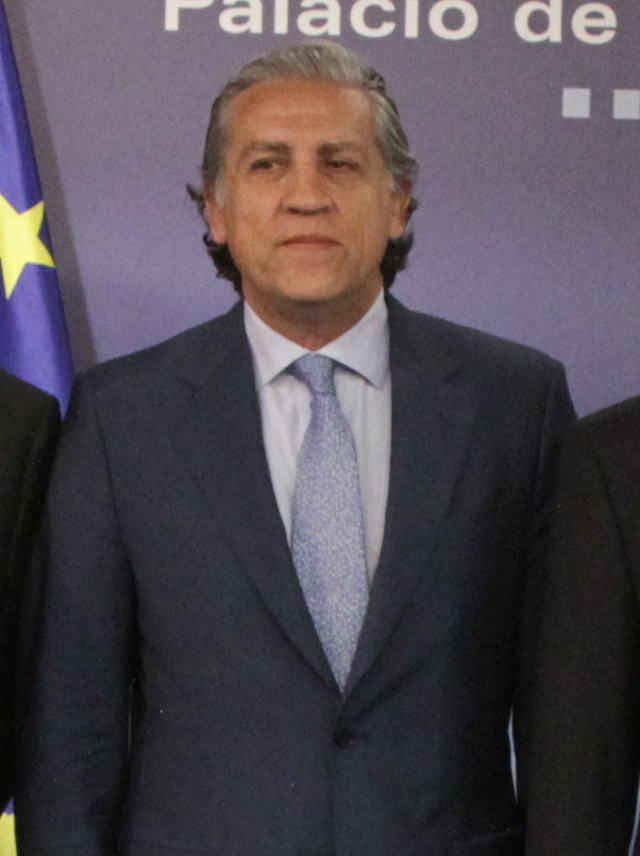
López Garrido in 2011

Diego López Garrido (born 8 September 1947) is a Spanish politician, university professor and Secretary of State for the European Union in the Spanish Ministry of Foreign Affairs and Cooperation, as well as a former minister of the Spanish government. He's currently Vice-president and Director at Fundación Alternativas.

== Biography ==
Born in Madrid (Spain), he comes from a big family of thirteen siblings, López Garrido attended the Colegio Santa María del Pilar, the Complutense University of Madrid and the Pontifical University of Comillas, where he graduated in Law and Economics. He later researched at the International Institute of Human Rights. In 1981 he obtained a Ph.D. in law from the Autonomous University of Madrid.

He was a lawyer of the Cortes Generales from 1975 to 1990, witnessing the coup of 23-F. In 1993 he was elected to the Congress of Deputies as a deputy for Madrid for the Spanish Socialist Workers' Party (PSOE). Diego López Garrido was spokesman for the PSOE group in the Parliament and held several positions within his party. He holds an academic position as a specialist in Constitutional and European Law.
