= Fundación Alternativas =

Spanish think tank

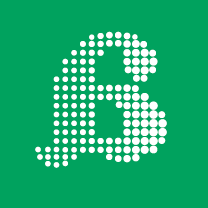
- Formation: 1999
- Type: Policy Think Tank
- Location: Madrid, Spain
- President: Manuel Gutiérrez Aragón
- Vice President: Diego López Garrido
- Website: www.fundacionalternativas.org

Fundación Alternativas (English: Alternatives Foundation) is a Spanish progressive think tank created in 1997 in Madrid which aims to discuss issues of interest to citizens and act as a channel of political, social, economic and cultural thought. Although many members of its trustees and members of the board belong to the social-democratic Spanish Socialist Workers' Party, the Foundation has no legal or organizational relationship with this party.

Management Team:

- President: Manuel Gutiérrez Aragón
- Vicepresident: Diego López Garrido
- Honorary President: Pere Portabella

Fundación Alternativas comprises four independently working study sections:

- Laboratorio de Políticas Públicas (Public Policies Laboratory), whose director is Jesús Ruiz-Huerta and its coordinator is Marcel Muñoz Rodríguez, is configured as a meeting place, discussion and collaboration between universities, researchers, public authorities and anyone else interested in improving collective life. Its primary goal is to bring public policy under permanent scrutiny, to assess its suitability for the construction of an advanced society in terms of individual and collective freedoms, justice and social equity and economic progress.
- Observatorio de Política Exterior española (OPEX) (Alternatives Foundation's Observatory of Spanish Foreign Policy) whose director is Vicente Palacio. OPEX was established in October 2004 to refresh and promote Spain's foreign policy on all fronts: politics, security, economics and culture. The Observatory seeks to act as a center of study, debate and dissemination of Spanish foreign policy issues from a progressive standpoint. Spanish foreign policy is analyzed from a critical point of view, open to innovative approaches in the different geographical and thematic, bilateral and multilateral areas within the framework of Spain's membership in the European Union and its inclusion in the globalization process.
- Estudios de Progreso (Studies on Progress), a program on progress and proposals for social change by young researchers.
- Observatorio de Cultura y Comunicación (OCC-FA) (Observatory for Culture and Communication), a center of study, debate and proposals on current transformations of culture and communication, and public policies that affect them. Its coordinator is Clara Román Jiménez.

From its foundation date, its president was Victoria Camps until 2001, when she was succeeded by Pere Portabella. Its board of trustees includes Felipe González, Gregorio Peces-Barba, Joaquín Almunia, José Luis Rodríguez Zapatero, among others.
