= Secretary of State for the European Union =

- Secretario de Estado para la Unión Europea
- Coat of Arms used by the Government

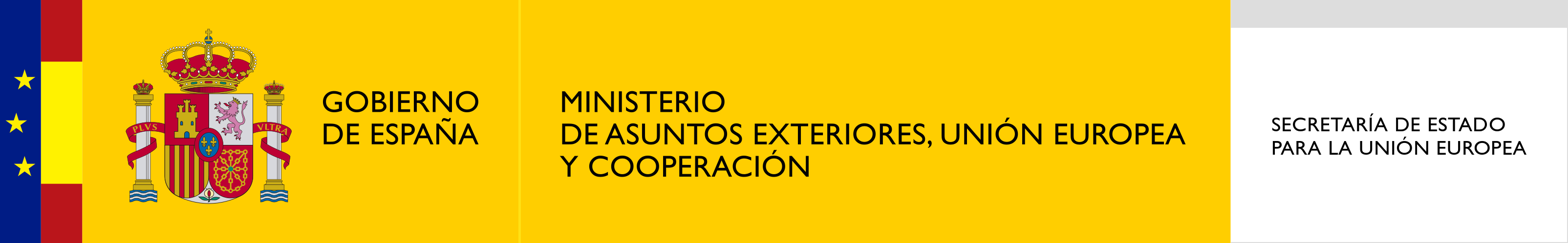

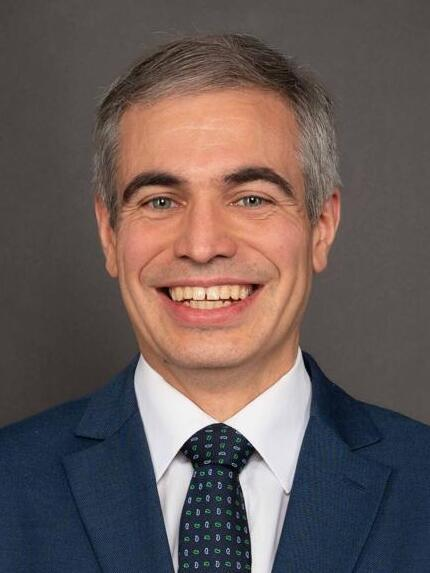
- Incumbent; Fernando Sampedro since 19 December 2023
- Ministry of Foreign Affairs, European Union and Cooperation; Secretariat of State for the European Union
- Style: The Most Excellent (formal); Mr. Secretary of State (informal)
- Abbreviation: SEUE
- Reports to: The Foreign Minister
- Nominator: The Foreign Minister
- Appointer: The Monarch
- Precursor: Minister for Relations with the European Communities
- Formation: February 27, 1981
- First holder: Raimundo Bassols
- Website: exteriores.gob.es

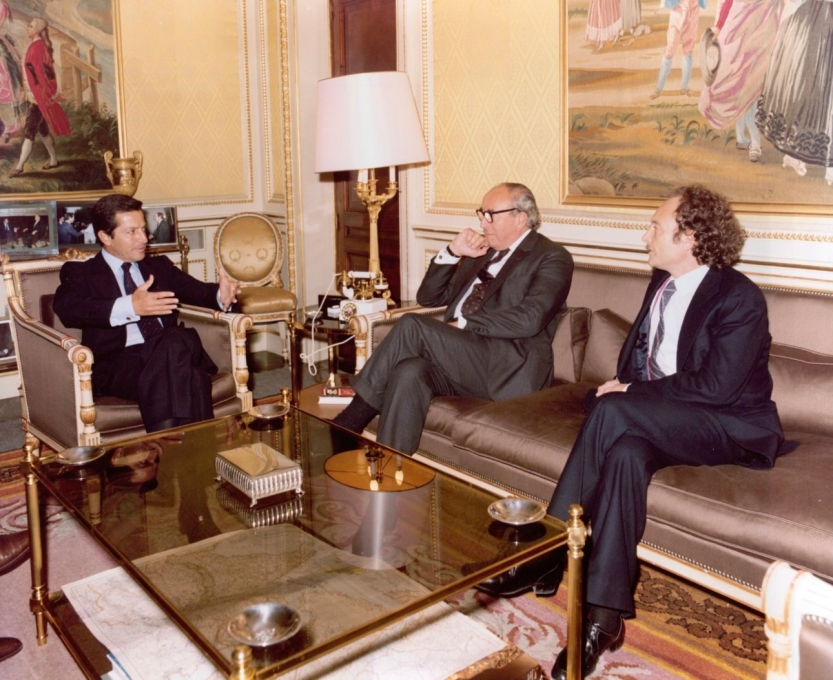
PM Adolfo Suárez with the EU Commission President, Roy Jenkins, and the Minister for Relations with the European Communities, Eduardo Punset.

The secretary of state for the European Union (SEUE) is a senior minister of the Spanish Ministry of Foreign Affairs, European Union and Cooperation. The SEUE is appointed by the Monarch on the advice of the Foreign Minister.

The secretary of state is responsible for designing and implementing the government's policy within the European Union. Likewise, he assists the foreign minister in the formulation and execution of Spain's foreign policy in the geographical area corresponding to the countries of the European Union, candidate countries, countries of the European Economic Area and other European countries —except Eastern Europe—. It also manages issues arising from Spain's membership in the Council of Europe.

As the highest official after the foreign minister in European Union affairs, the secretary of state is responsible for overseeing the actions of the different bodies of the different national administrations within the European Union as well as overseeing and giving orders to the Permanent Representative of Spain to the European Union.

== History ==
The origin of this secretariat of state dates back to July 26, 1977 when prime minister Adolfo Suárez officially applied for admission of Spain in the European Communities, three days after the Cortes Generales approved it.

To start the negotiations, the prime minister created in July 1978 a Ministry for the Relations with the European Communities and appointed Leopoldo Calvo-Sotelo as minister. The negotiations started on February 5, 1979. Eduard Punset succeeded Calvo-Sotelo in the Ministry in 1980 until 1981, when the Ministry was suppressed and was degraded to a secretariat of state within the Ministry of Foreign Affairs.

After this, the foreign minister Fernando Morán López assumed a main role in the negotiations being supported by the Secretary of State for Relations with the European Communities, culminating in the signing of the accession agreement in June 1985 and entry into force in January 1986. Before all of this process, in 1962, Spain already requested the accession but was rejected because the country was under a dictatorship.

With the entrance of Spain in the Union, the country quickly became one of the most important and influential countries of the EU by assuming important offices such as High Representative for the Common Foreign and Security Policy with Javier Solana and the Presidency of the European Parliament with Josep Borrell and Manuel Marín (being considered the father of the Erasmus Programme).

The first and second Secretaries of State had to work with a very small staff because this department originally was devised as an auxiliary body to the Minister in the accession negotiations but in 1985 an important reform was carried out in the Foreign Ministry. With the entry in the Union, the Secretariat of State was focused not in negotiations affairs but in coordination between the Spanish administrations and the European institutions.

With the change of government in 1996, the new prime minister elevated the category of the General Secretariat for Foreign Policy to Secretariat of State and merged it with the Secretariat of State for European Communities, being responsible not only for the relations with the European Union but the rest of the world.

In 2000, the secretariat of state split in two and this one was renamed «for European Affairs». In 2004 was adopted the current denomination «for the European Union», that was briefly changed between 2017 and 2018 «for European Affairs» but recovered by the Sánchez government.

=== Names ===
- Secretary of State for Relations with the European Communities (1981–1985)
- Secretary of State for the European Communities (1985–1995)
- Secretary of State for the European Union (1995–1996)
- Secretary of State for Foreign Policy and for the European Union (1996–2000)
- Secretary of State for European Affairs (2000–2004)
- Secretary of State for the European Union (2004–2017)
- Secretary of State for European Affairs (2017–2018)
- Secretary of State for the European Union (2018–present)

== Structure ==
The Secretariat of State is composed by the following bodies:

- The Secretary of State.
  - The General Secretariat for the European Union, which assist the secretary of state in European Union Affairs.
    - The Directorate-General for Integration and Coordination of General Affairs of the European Union.
      It's the department responsible for following the European Union policies and coordinate the national departments that collaborate in that policies; for establishing the Spanish position regarding these policies and the preparation of the meetings of the EU General Affairs Council. It is also responsible for overseeing the regional governments actions in the EU; to study the European Union reform proposals as wells as the possible enlargement or withrawal of member states and the promotion of the Spanish language and the presence of Spanish citizens in the European institutions.
    - The Directorate-General for the Coordination of the Internal Market and other Community Policies
      It's the department in charge of following the European Union policies and coordinate the national departments that collaborate in that policies along with the Directorate-General for Integration and Coordination of General Affairs of the European Union; the management before the EU institutions of public aids and the following of and the advisement about the European Union law and the actings before the CJEU in coordination with the Office of the Solicitor General. It also prepares the meetings of the EU Competitiveness Council and the EU Internal Market Consultative Committee.
  - The Directorate-General for Western, Central and Southeast Europe
  It's the department responsible for the proposal and execution of the Spanish foreign policy over this geographical area and the momentum of bilateral relations with these countries. It's responsible also for the proposal and following of the position of Spain over the Gibraltar dispute in coordination with other departments of the Administration.

The secretary of state has a Cabinet for political and parliamentary assistance.

From the Secretariat of State also depends organically the Solicitor's Office before the Court of Justice of the European Union although functionally depends from the Office of the Solicitor General and the Ministry of Justice.

== List of SEUE ==
No.	Image	Name	Term of office			Minister(s) serving under	Prime Minister
No.	Image	Name	Took office	Left office	Duration	Minister(s) serving under	Prime Minister
1.º		Raimundo Bassols	28 February 1981	8 December 1982	1 year, 283 days	José Pedro Pérez-Llorca	Leopoldo Calvo-Sotelo
2.º		Manuel Marín	8 December 1982	28 October 1985	2 years, 324 days	Fernando Morán López Francisco Fernández Ordóñez	Felipe González
3.º		Pedro Solbes	28 October 1985	16 March 1991	5 years, 139 days	Fernando Morán López	Felipe González
4.º		Carlos Westendorp	16 March 1991	23 December 1995	4 years, 282 days	Fernando Morán López Javier Solana	Felipe González
5.º		Emilio Fernández-Castaño	23 December 1995	14 May 1996	143 days	Carlos Westendorp	Felipe González
6.º		Ramón de Miguel y Egea	14 May 1996	20 April 2004	7 years, 342 days	Abel Matutes Josep Piqué Ana Palacio	José María Aznar
7.º		Alberto Navarro González	20 April 2004	15 April 2008	3 years, 361 days	Miguel Ángel Moratinos	José Luis Rodríguez Zapatero
8.º		Diego López Garrido	15 April 2008	24 December 2011	3 years, 253 days	Miguel Ángel Moratinos Trinidad Jiménez	José Luis Rodríguez Zapatero
9.º		Íñigo Méndez de Vigo; Baron of Claret	24 December 2011	27 June 2015	3 years, 185 days	José Manuel García-Margallo	Mariano Rajoy
10.º		Fernando Eguidazu Palacios	27 June 2015	3 December 2016	1 year, 159 days	José Manuel García-Margallo	Mariano Rajoy
11.º		Jorge Toledo Albiñana	3 December 2016	23 June 2018	1 year, 202 days	Alfonso Dastis	Mariano Rajoy
12.º		Marco Aguiriano	23 June 2018	5 February 2020	1 year, 227 days	Josep Borrell	Pedro Sánchez
13.º		Juan González-Barba Pera	5 February 2020	22 December 2021	1 year, 320 days	Arancha González Laya	Pedro Sánchez
14.º		Pascual Navarro Ríos	22 December 2021	19 December 2023	1 year, 362 days	José Manuel Albares	Pedro Sánchez
15.º		Fernando Sampedro	19 December 2023	Incumbent	2 years, 262 days	José Manuel Albares	Pedro Sánchez
