= Ministry of Foreign Affairs (Spain) =

Government ministry of Spain

Ministry of Foreign Affairs, European Union and Cooperation
- Ministerio de Asuntos Exteriores, Unión Europea y Cooperación (Spanish)

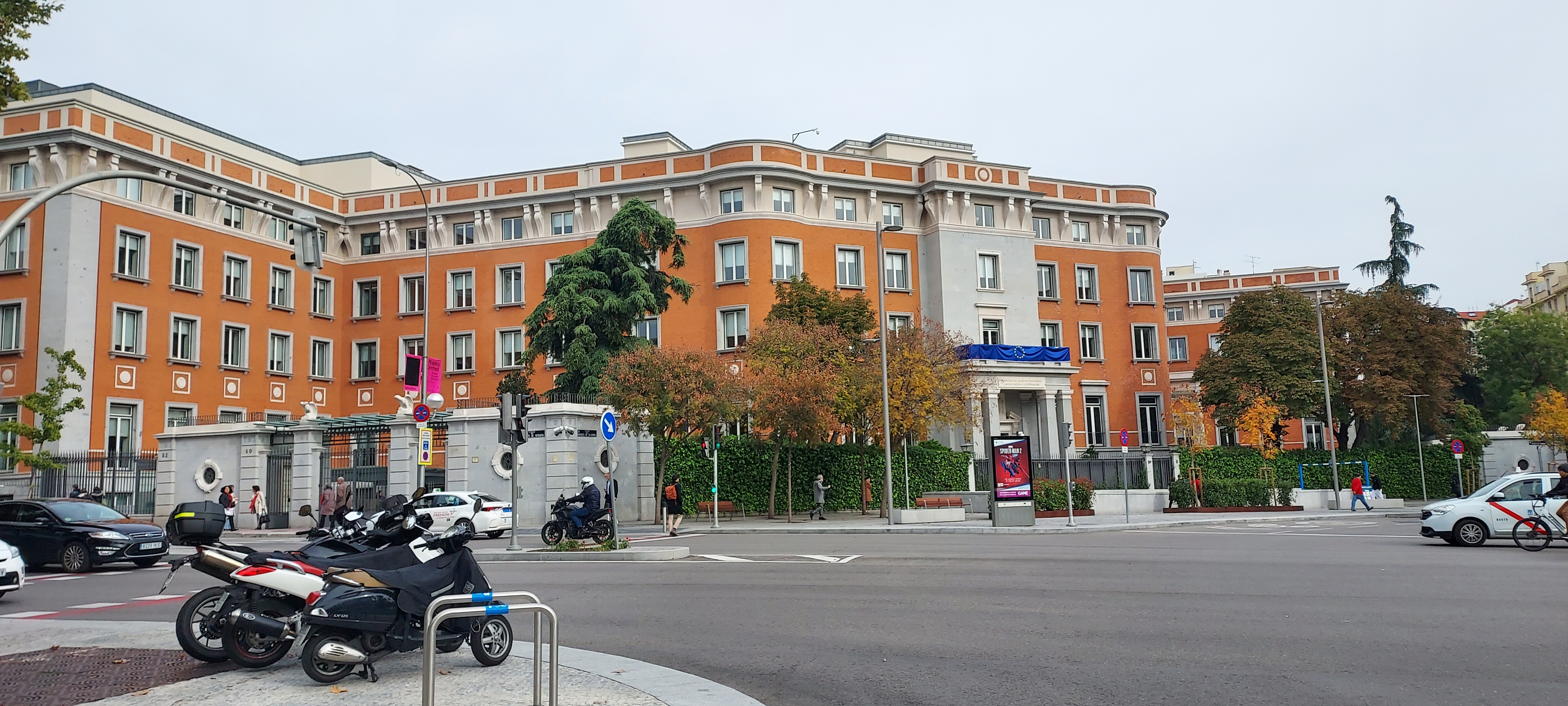
- Main headquarters in Madrid

Agency overview
- Formed: 30 November 1714; 311 years ago
- Type: Ministry
- Jurisdiction: Government of Spain
- Headquarters: Marquess of Salamanca Square, Salamanca district, Madrid
- Employees: Around 7,500 (2025–26)
- Annual budget: € 2.12 billion, 2026
- Minister responsible: José Manuel Albares, Minister
- Agency executives: Diego Martínez Belío, Secretary of State for Foreign Affairs; Fernando Sampedro, Secretary of State for the European Union; Susana Sumelzo, Secretary of State for Ibero-America; Eva Granados, Secretary of State for International Cooperation; Sergio Cuesta Francisco, Under-Secretary
- Child agencies: Diplomatic School; AECID; Cervantes Institute; Spanish Academy in Rome
- Website: exteriores.gob.es

The Ministry of Foreign Affairs, European Union and Cooperation (MAEUEC) is a department of the Government of Spain responsible for the country's foreign policy and relations, paying special attention to the ones in relation to the European Union and Ibero-America, as well as managing Spain's international cooperation for development policy. In these sense, it is responsible for promoting international economic, cultural and scientific relationships, taking part in the proposal and enforcement of the migration policy, promoting cross-border and interterritorial cooperation, protecting Spaniards abroad and preparing and negotiating the international treaties which Spain is part of.

The Foreign Ministry is the nationwide department that oversees the Foreign Action of the rest of government departments, the Spanish regions and other administrations, as well as overseeing the Foreign Action of the constitutional bodies. In this sense, from the Ministry depends the Spanish Foreign Service, the set of individuals, bodies and institutions with competence in foreign matters. As of 2026, the ministry maintains 218 diplomatic posts around the world, including 116 embassies and 91 consulates. This number does not includes the 73 cooperation units of the AECID (cooperation offices and cultural and training centers) and the 103 Instituto Cervantes centers around the world.

Established in 1714 with the creation of the first five specialized government departments —State, Justice and Ecclesiastical Affairs, War, Navy and the Indies, and Finance—, it is headed by the Foreign Minister, who is appointed by the Monarch on the advice of the Prime Minister. The minister of foreign affairs is one of the most important offices of the Council of Ministers, ranking only behind the royal family, the prime minister, and deputy prime ministers, if any, in protocol. The current foreign minister is José Manuel Albares, former ambassador to France, who was appointed on 12 July 2021.

== History ==
=== Early period ===
Diplomacy was born with the first Nation-States, being Spain one of the oldest Nation-States that continues to exist today. The first diplomatic relations of Spain as a unified entity began to be carried out with the Catholic Monarchs, who established permanent embassies to the Holy See, Venice, London, Holy Roman Empire or Paris, among others—, many of which are still in operational.

This meant that, by 1500, the Spanish Monarchy had a permanent foreign service distributed across the major European powers —the largest of its time— which would be strengthened during the reigns of Charles I and Philip II due to the need to protect the interests of the Empire. The creation of the Council of State will centralize diplomatic information through it, gaining prestige and giving rise to the figure of the Secretary of the Council of State or Secretary of State, a dignity that will later pass to the ministers during the time of the first Bourbons. In 1625, the position of conductor (Note: Conductor literally means "driver", but in this contexts means "the person who leads" the ambassadors before the court.), later known as introductor de embajadores (introducer of ambassadors) was created.

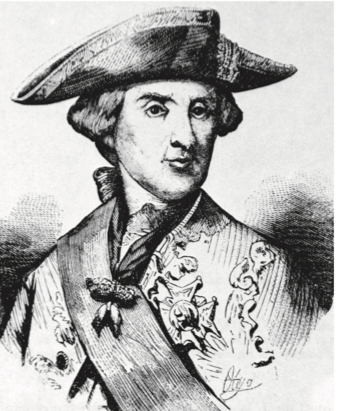
Portrait of José de Grimaldo, first person to hold the office between 1714 and 1724

The Peace of Westphalia of 1648, in addition to ending the Thirty Years' War and the Eighty Years' War, was the first modern diplomatic congress. This event is considered the birth of international relations as we know them today, establishing a new order in Europe based on the concept of national sovereignty. Ambassadors already existed and gradually strengthened their functions, becoming essential elements of foreign policy, a foreign policy closely controlled by the Crown.

During the reign of Philip V, in 1705, the Secretariat of the Universal Bureau was divided, giving rise to a Secretariat for matters of War and Finance and another "for everything else". This last Secretariat is considered by some authors as the beginning of what we know today as the Ministry of Foreign Affairs, (Note: In a ministerial order of 2 October 1951, the Spanish government itself established the date of foundation on 11 July 1705.) although the most widespread position is that its creation dates back to 30 November 1714, when the government was structured into four secretariats of state and a Veeduría General (Note: Accordign to the Royal Spanish Academy, a veedor is an "inspector, visitor or observer", so the Veeduría is the Office of the Inspector.) for the Royal Treasury.

These were the five original government departments:

- The First Secretariat of State, which handled matters "of State, including negotiations and correspondence with other Sovereigns, and with their Ministers and those of foreign countries, which must be conducted and dealt with by a single party".
- The Secretariat of State for "everything pertaining to the [Catholic] Church and Justice, and the jurisdiction of the Councils and Courts".
- The Secretariat of State for "war affairs".
- The Secretariat of State for "matters of the Indies and those pertaining to the Navy".
- The Veeduría General. Treasury affairs were entrusted to Jean Orry. Although the Veeduría was not described as a secretariat of state, it was de facto one, since, as the Royal Decree states, he participated in, advised, and reported to the Cabinet Council (a kind of council of ministers where the Secretaries of State met).

Following the creation of the Secretariat of State, which was entrusted to The Marquess of Grimaldo, former secretary of state for war and treasury, it assumed much of the powers that the Council of State had over foreign policy, leaving this Council as an advisory and debate body, since the powers over appointments and economic management of diplomacy as well as correspondence between chancelleries were assigned to the secretary of state. However, this Secretariat was not only responsible for foreign relations, but also assumed a large part of domestic policy; it governed the royal sites, supervised the postal service and it had a relevant role in the creation of Royal Academies and in the process of granting new aristocratic honours, and it assisted the monarch in issuing decrees and in the relations between the Crown and other institutions, making it the center of the government and, in practice, its officeholder was a prime minister, reason why he was known as "First Secretary of State". An example of this was that the new ministers of the royal cabinet were sworn in before this "prime minister". Despite the power and the similarities to this modern figure, the secretary of state was not a prime minister and, on many occasions, he was overshadowed and subordinated to the king's favourite, as happened with Giulio Alberoni (1715–1719), The Baron Ripperda (1725–1726) or The Prince of the Peace in the reign of Charles IV.

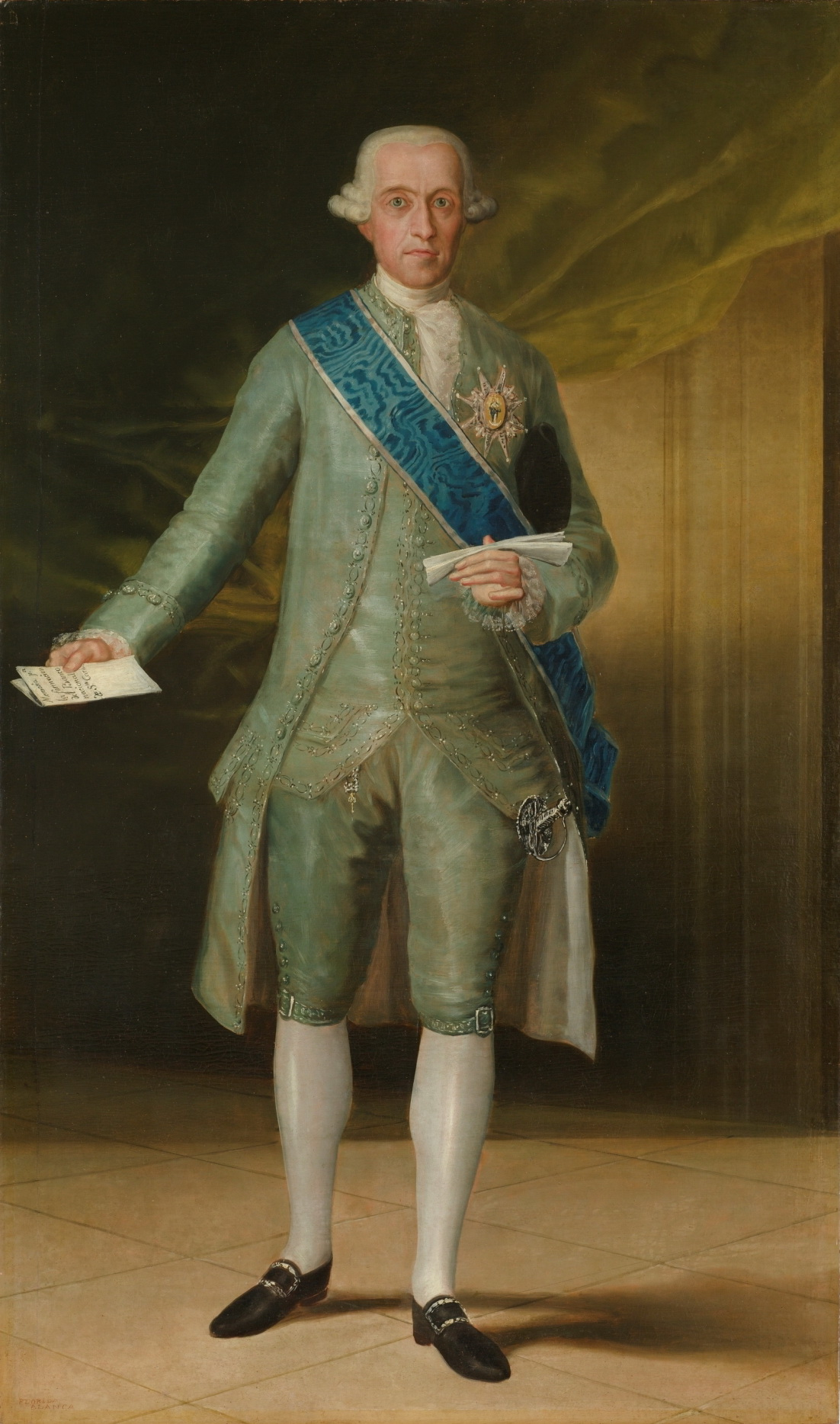
Floridablanca, painted by Goya (Prado Museum)

In later years, this body evolved similarly, as its new leaders, especially the Count of Floridablanca and The Prince of the Peace, continued the trend of monopolizing much of the political power, overshadowing their peers. Thus, their powers increased over the economic and governmental management of the Royal Sites, the management of a large part of the responsibilities of the Secretariat of the Indies, the General Superintendency of Granaries, local roads, the General Agency of Prayers to Rome, the Madrid police, charities, orphanages, printing, the press, schools, the orders of Charles III and Maria Luisa, the national archives, health, and industry, among many others.

All of the above must be understood without taking into account those matters in which the Secretary of State participated directly as a favorite of the king, without having the authority to do so, especially following the constitution of the Supreme Board of State in 1787, which, acting similarly to a Council of Ministers, assumed the weight of political decisions. With the fall of The Count of Floridablanca in 1792 and the coming to power of The Count of Aranda, he influenced King Charles IV to suppress this board and return to the previous system with the Council of State as the central organ of administration, although this did not reduce the dependence of the Secretariats of State from the First Secretariat of State.

=== Nineteenth century ===
In 1812, the Cortes of Cádiz approved the first Spanish constitution, which included up to seven Secretariats of State, the first of which was the First Secretariat of State. One of the new departments was the Secretariat of the Government of the Kingdom, which assumed vast responsibilities regarding the domestic government.

After the Napoleonic Wars, the international relations changed and do so the foreign relations of Spain. In 1833, the Secretariat was renamed as Ministry of State, with Francisco Cea Bermúdez as minister. With this change, Spain was brought into line with its European peers and, with the approval of the Royal Statute of 1834, the Minister of State ceased to act as a prime minister when the figure of the President of the Council of Ministers was constitutionally conceived, although in the following years it was common for the holder of the presidency to also assume the portfolio of State.

On 16 June 1834, the Undersecretariat of the Ministry was created and the heads of the departments were authorized by The Queen Regent to organize its own ministerial offices. The following year, The Count of Toreno, prime minister and minister of state, reorganized his department with two sections: two for politics (responsible for diplomatic and political correspondence with embassies and other foreign representations and that of diplomatic agents and consuls of the Crown abroad), one for Trade and Consulates (responsible for the diplomatic and political correspondence of the Crown's diplomatic agents and consuls abroad on matters of science, arts, industry, commerce, and navigation; commercial treaties, and claims and notes relating to commercial matters. He was also, apparently temporarily, assigned responsibility for any political negotiations that might be initiated with the new states of South America) and another for Accounting and Internal Affairs (responsible for economic and budget affairs; human and material resources; matters relating to the royal family, grandees and nobility; advisory councils; introducer of ambassadors, crosses and honours; police, passports, licences and legalisations; and ultimately, all those matters that do not fit into the other sections).

From 1854 to 1858, the State Department managed the overseas affairs. During the First Republic, some elements related to the monarchy were eliminated, such as the position of introducer of ambassadors, defined then as a "useless wheel" of the administration, "pure apparatus and of no use", and the main orders of the State: Charles III, Isabella the Catholic and Noble Ladies of Queen Maria Luisa.

Once the Monarchy was reestablished with Alfonso XII as king, the measures approved during the young republic were reversed and the department began to be organized through an Undersecretariat and the sections (also called directorates) of Political Affairs, Administration and Accounting, and Trade and Consulates, as well as smaller departments of Archives and Library and the Secretariat of Language Interpretation.

The second term of The Marquess of Vega de Armijo as minister of state was a revolution. In September 1888, the Marquess reorganized the Ministry, increasing it from four to eleven sections, namely: Chancellery; Orders; European Policy; American Policy; Asian, African, and Oceanic Policy; Court Affairs; Commerce; Consulates; Accounting; Pious Works; and Archives, Library, and Language Interpretation.

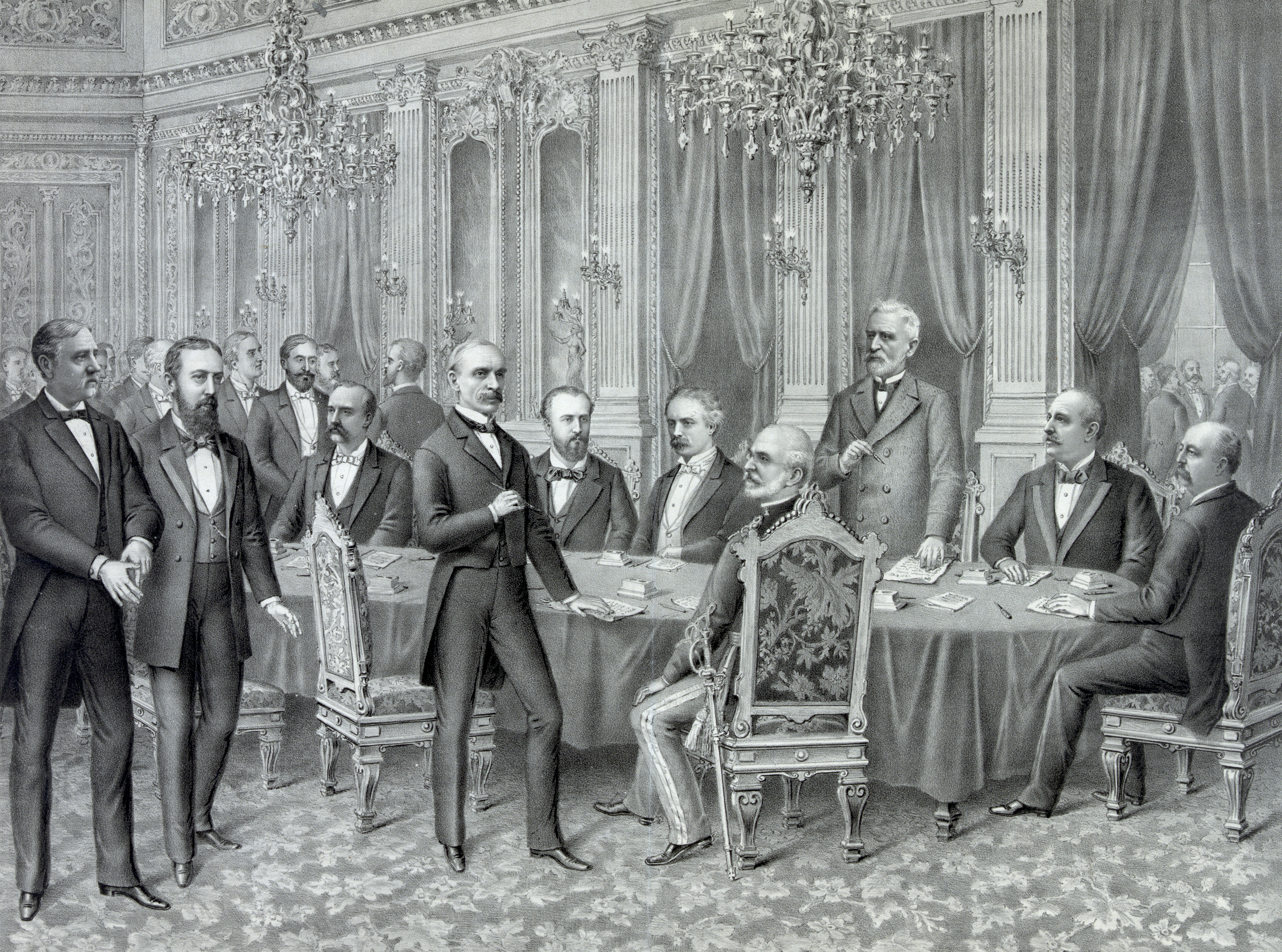
Drawing of the signing of the Treaty of Paris. The Spanish delegation was led by Eugenio Montero Ríos.

The 1890s, especially the late 1890s, were not a good time for Spain, a fact reflected in the Ministry. The budget cuts of 1893–94 and the Spanish–American War led to the suppression of many of the departments and positions created by the Marquess, dropping —excluding the Undersecretariat— from eleven sections in 1893 to four after the reform of mid-1899. This last reform structured the Department through the Undersecretariat —which brought together the sections of general affairs and personnel, registry, policy, and legal affairs— and four sections: Policy; Accounting and Pious Works; Commerce; and Protocol (or Chancellery). It also maintained independent units dedicated to language interpretation; archives and libraries; concierge and auxiliary staff. This structure would remain almost intact until the Second Republic.

=== Twentieth century ===
The new century began with the move of the ministerial headquarters in 1901 to the Santa Cruz Palace. Likewise, a Colonial Section was created that assumed part of the powers of the extinct Ministry of Overseas and, years later, in 1912, a specific Section was created for the Spanish protectorate in Morocco, which disappeared in 1924 when the Moroccan Office was created in the Office of the Prime Minister.

In 1928, the Ministry of State merged with the Office of the Prime Minister, returning to the times when the First Secretary of State was a kind-of a premier with foreign affairs responsibilities. This just lasted two years because, in 1930, The Count of Xauen split them again.

With the proclamation of the Second Republic, the ministry was organized in the following directorates: Protocol and Diplomatic Secretariat; General Affairs; Political Affairs; Commercial Affairs; and Court Affairs. This structure changed numerous times between 1933 and 1935. In May 1937, the Ministry of State assumed the services and powers of the Ministry of Propaganda, which was abolished, creating an Undersecretariat of Propaganda that existed until the end of the Civil War.

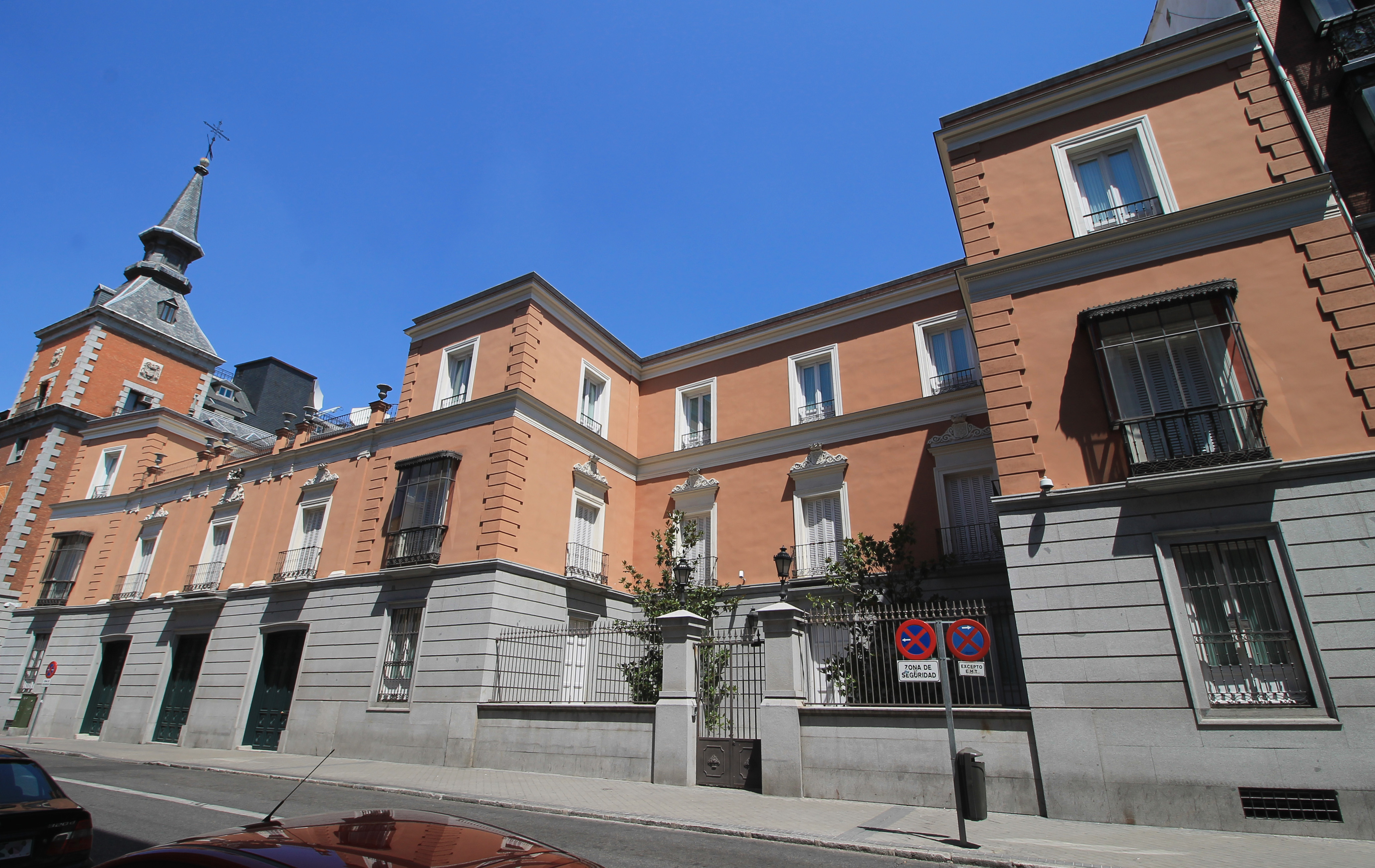
The Palace of Viana, official residence of the Foreign Minister since 1939.

During the aforementioned civil conflict, each side organized its own foreign relations services. In the case of the Republic, it had to do so practically from scratch, since, as historian Ángel Viñas wrote, "of the almost 390 diplomats before 18 July 1936, only 55 remained loyal to constitutional legality, not counting some who deserted after the first year [...]". In the case of the rebel side, a law was passed in January 1938 renaming the department as "Ministry of Foreign Affairs" and dividing it into sections: Foreign Policy, International Treaties; Relations with the Holy See; and Protocol. A year later, the Palace of Viana was chosen as the official residence of the Minister of Foreign Affairs and, in 1942, the Diplomatic School was created. In 1949, the Directorate-General for Consular Affairs was established. Between 1942 and 1946 a series of reforms were carried out that established the Directorate-General as basic unit of the Ministry. The last reform, in 1946, ratified the under-secretary as the principal assistant and four general directorates (Foreign Policy; Economic Policy; Cultural Relations; and Internal Regime), the Protocol and Orders Service, the Diplomatic Cabinet and the Diplomatic School. Likewise, other relevant attached departments are included, such as the Diplomatic Information Office (OID) or the International Legal Advice Office (AJI).

After twenty years without major changes, the ministry underwent a major overhaul in 1966. The Undersecretariat for Foreign Policy was created to replace the Directorate-General of the same name, and new directorates-general were created under its umbrella: European and Holy See Affairs; Ibero-American Affairs; and African and Arab World Affairs. The Directorate-General for North American, Middle Eastern, and Far Eastern Affairs was also attached to this undersecretariat. Furthermore, the Directorate-General for Internal Affairs took on its current name, "Directorate-General for the Foreign Service". A year later, in order to reduce government spending, some departments are abolished, but most of them were recovered in 1970. Precisely, in this last year the Technical General Secretariat is created.

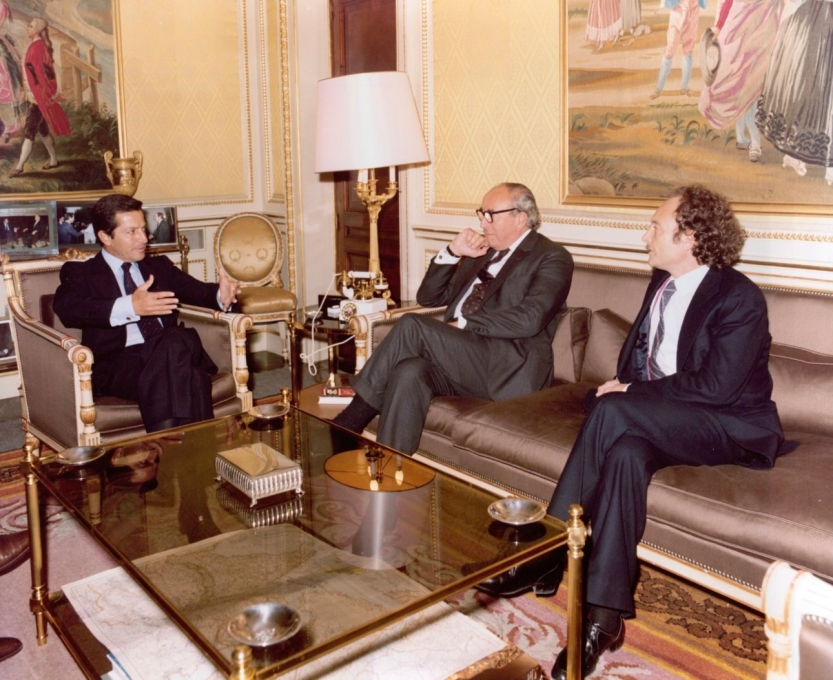
Prime Minister Adolfo Suárez (left) with the President of the Commission, Roy Jenkins (center), and the Minister of Relations with the European Communities, Eduardo Punset (right)

During the Spanish transition to democracy, the Foreign Ministry was a fundamental institution, since it was in charge of transmitting to the world the political change that Spanish society was living and promoting relations with Ibero-America and other priority regions for Spanish foreign policy. Of all of them, the Department's approach to the European Communities stands out. From 1979 to 1981, the responsibilities for foreign affairs were shared between the foreign minister and the minister for Relations with the European Communities (the latter primarily focused on accession negotiations). After 1981, the two positions were merged, and the Secretariat of State for Relations with the European Communities (since 1995, Secretariat of State for the European Union, SEUE) was created within the Ministry.

Indeed, during this period the figure of the modern Secretary of State became widespread, as a junior minister in charge of an area of government or simply as the right-hand of the minister. In the case of foreign affairs, in 1979 the Secretary of State for Foreign Affairs (SEAEX) was created as a body of "general competence, especially dedicated to collaborating with the minister in the performance of his high duties" and, a few years later, the Secretary of State for International Cooperation and Ibero-America (SECIPI) would be created. These, together with the SEUE, have been the three (or four when international cooperation and Ibero-America have been separated) pillars on which the minister has relied in the exercise of his powers.

In 1988 the Spanish Agency for International Cooperation was created as a result of the merger of the Ibero-American Cooperation Institute (1945–1988) and the Hispano-Arab Institute of Culture (1954–1988). Its headquarters were established in the former palace that housed the Ibero-American Cooperation Institute.

=== Present ===
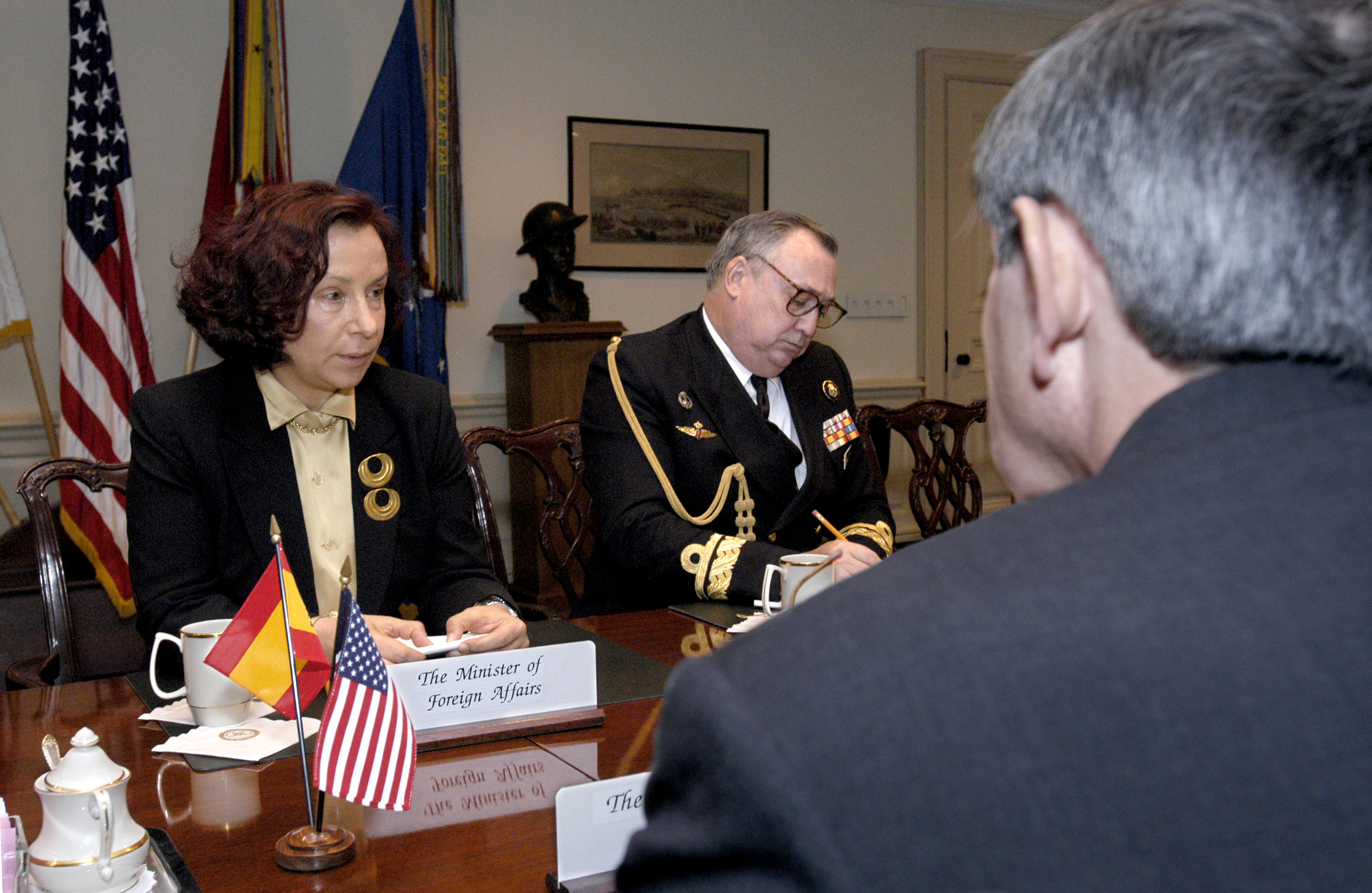
Minister Ana Palacio in a meeting with secretary Paul Wolfowitz in 2003

More recently, in 2000, the Ministry moved its headquarters to the palace located in the Marquess of Salamanca Square, a 50,455-square-meter complex that had to be abandoned in 2004–5 after environmental problems were detected that made its occupancy impossible. The minister's office and other central services returned to the Santa Cruz Palace, but given the impossibility of housing all the services, these were distributed among different locations, some of them rented, such as the Ágora Towers in Madrid. In 2016, the government approved the renovation of the former ministerial headquarters, planning to return to it in 2020. The move finally took place at the end of 2021, and it was inaugurated by King Felipe VI in January 2022.

In 2004 the Ministry was renamed «Ministry of Foreign Affairs and Cooperation» with the aim of highlighting the role of Spain as a country committed to supporting the most disadvantaged peoples through cooperation for development. The change was not merely nominal, as the Department went from having a budget of about 1.4 billion in 2004 to more than 3.5 billion in 2010, thanks to the increase in the allocation for cooperation. Since 2010, and during the 2008–2014 Spanish financial crisis, the trend was downward. Once the economic situation improved, these items began to recover.

In 2006, SECIPI split into two, creating a Secretariat of State for Ibero-America. It existed until 2010 and again since 2021.

In 2007, the AECI was restructured and renamed as Spanish Agency for International Development Cooperation (AECID). It assumed a large part of the cooperation responsibilities of several Ministry's bodies, particularly those of the historic Directorate-General for Cultural and Scientific Relations, which was abolished.

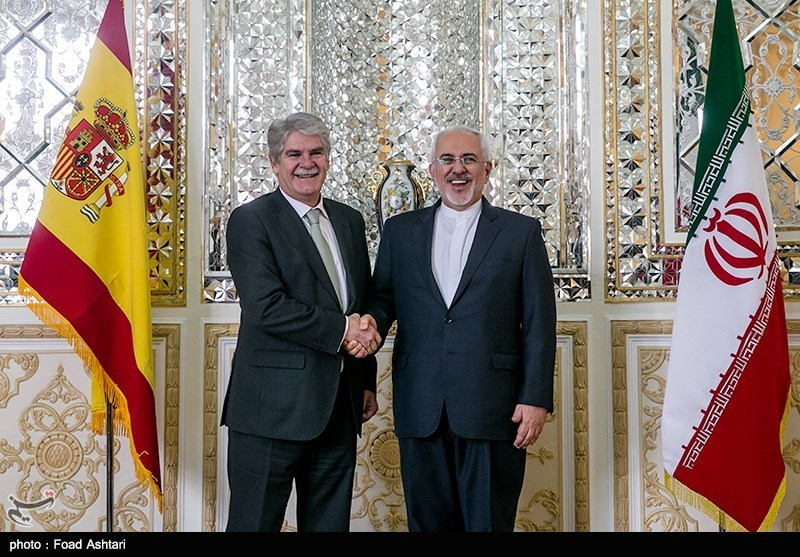
Minister Alfonso Dastis with his Iranian counterpart Mohammad Javad Zarif in a visit to Tehran in 2018

In 2018, with a similar objective to the previous occasion, the department was renamed "Ministry of Foreign Affairs, European Union and Cooperation", to emphasize Spain's pro-European vocation and the primary importance that Spanish foreign policy grants, through this Ministry, to the European Union. At the same time, the Secretariat of State for Global Spain was created; initially, its sole responsibility was to improve and promote Spain's image, but in 2020, its responsibilities were expanded to include other areas such as economic diplomacy, management of the Department's communications, and long-term studies on foreign policy. It was abolished in 2021, with the minister assuming its functions.

== Organization ==
Organizational chart Spanish Ministry of Foreign Affairs, November 2024

The Minister of Foreign Affairs, European Union and Cooperation is the most senior official in the Department. He or she is a member of the Council of Ministers and is appointed by the Monarch, on the advice of the Prime Minister.

According to the Law 40/2015, of October 1st, on the Legal Regime of the Public Sector, Section 61, the minister directs the department's policy and assumes responsibility for it. He or she also establishes the internal organization, appoints senior officials, and approves expenses. Immediately subordinate to the minister are the secretaries of state, who assist the minister in the design and implementation of policies, and the under-secretary, who assists the minister in the day-to-day running of the department. At the same time, numerous directors-general, deputy directors-general and autonomous agencies report to them.

As of 2026, this is the organization of the Ministry:

Ministry Organization (2026)
Minister	Cabinet
Minister	Directorate-General for Economic Diplomacy
Minister	Diplomatic Information Office
Minister	Migration Affairs Office
Secretary of State for Foreign Affairs	Directorate-General for Foreign Policy and Security
Secretary of State for Foreign Affairs	Directorate-General for the United Nations, International Organizations and Human Rights
Secretary of State for Foreign Affairs	Directorate-General for the Maghreb, the Mediterranean and the Middle East
Secretary of State for Foreign Affairs	Directorate-General for Africa
Secretary of State for Foreign Affairs	Directorate-General for North America, Eastern Europe, Asia and Pacific
Secretary of State for the European Union	General Secretariat for the European Union
Secretary of State for the European Union	Directorate-General for Integration and Coordination of General Affairs of the European Union
Secretary of State for the European Union	Directorate-General for the Coordination of the Internal Market and other European Policies
Secretary of State for the European Union	Directorate-General for Western, Central and Southeast Europe
Secretary of State for Ibero-America and the Caribbean and Spanish in the World	Directorate-General for Ibero-America and the Caribbean
Secretary of State for Ibero-America and the Caribbean and Spanish in the World	Directorate-General for Spanish in the World
Secretary of State for Ibero-America and the Caribbean and Spanish in the World	Instituto Cervantes
Secretary of State for International Cooperation	Directorate-General for Sustainable Development Policies
Secretary of State for International Cooperation	Spanish Agency for International Development Cooperation
Secretary of State for International Cooperation	Spanish Academy in Rome
Under-Secretary	Technical General Secretariat
Under-Secretary	Directorate-General for the Foreign Service
Under-Secretary	Directorate-General for Spaniards Abroad and Consular Affairs
Under-Secretary	Introducer of Ambassadors
Under-Secretary	Inspectorate-General of Services
Under-Secretary	Budget Office
Under-Secretary	International Legal Advice Office
Under-Secretary	Diplomatic School
Under-Secretary	Pious Work of the Holy Places

=== Houses Network ===
With the aim of strengthening cooperation between Spain and the different societies and cultures around the world, the General State Administration has a set of public consortiums, called Casas (lit. 'houses'), that channel this objective. Since 2015, these consortiums have been coordinated through the Red de Casas (Network of Houses).

As of 2026, there are six consortiums:

- Casa América. Founded in 1992, it is the oldest of all and aims to strengthen ties between Spain and the Americas, especially Latin America. It is located in the city of Madrid.
- Casa Asia. Based in Barcelona and founded in 2001, it focuses on Asia-Pacific societies.
- Casa África. Founded in 2006, it is based in Las Palmas and seeks to strengthen Spanish-African relations.
- Casa Árabe. Active since 2006, its mission is to improve understanding with the Arab and Islamic world. It has offices in Madrid and Córdoba.
- Centro Sefarad-Israel (lit. 'Sepharad-Israel Centre'). It is the only one not to be called Casa, although it is part of the Network. Like the previous two, it was established in 2006 with the aim of focusing on relations with the Jewish community and Israel. Its headquarters are in Madrid.
- Casa Mediterráneo. Located in Alicante and founded in 2009, it is focused on relations with the countries of the Mediterranean basin.

== Headquarters ==
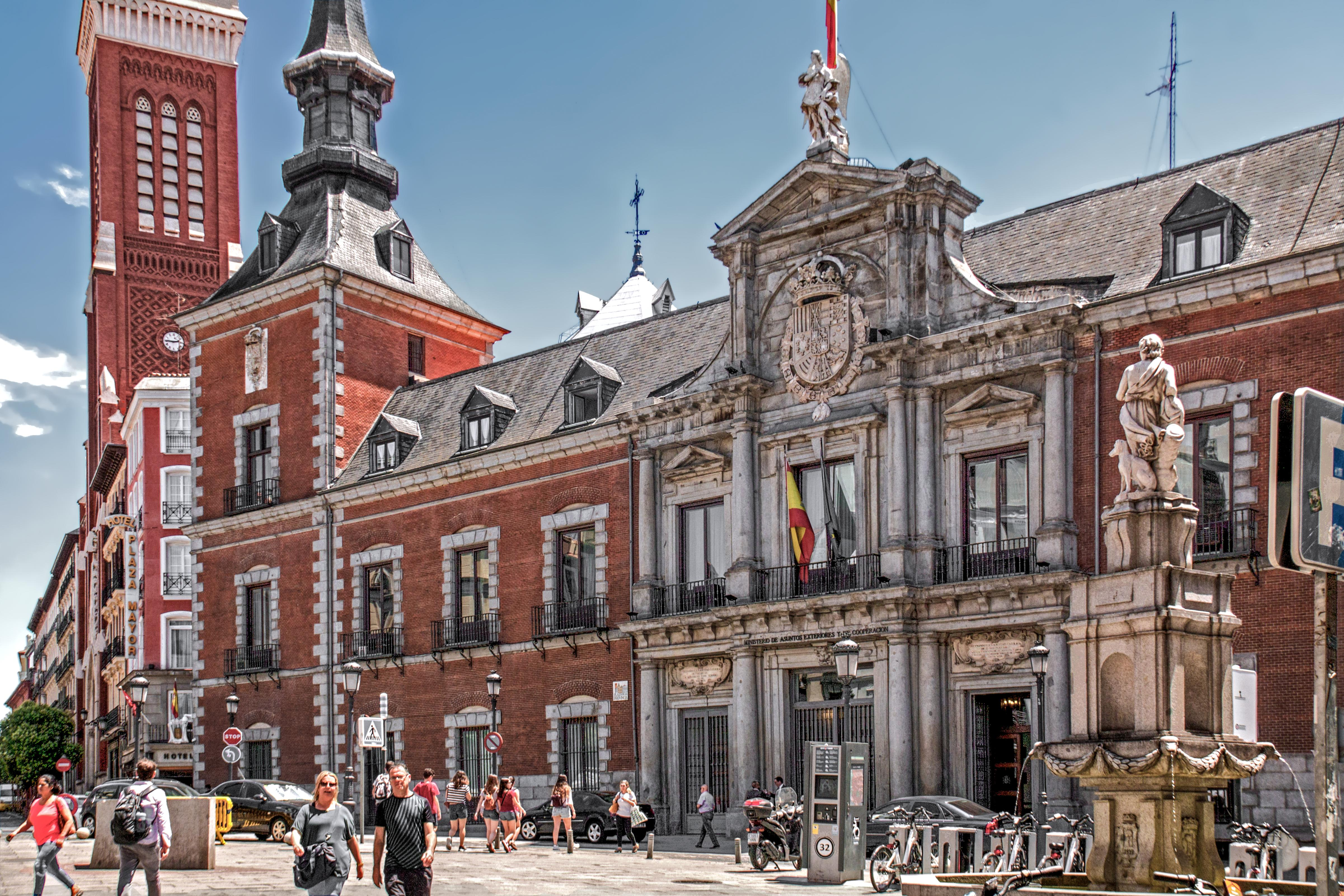
Santa Cruz Palace, headquarters of the Ministry between 1901 and 2000, and from 2004 to 2021. Currently, although not the main building, it remains one of the Department's headquarters.

Until 1734, the first offices of the First Secretariat of State, popularly and contemptuously called "covachuelas", (Note: Covachuela is the diminutive of cueva (cave), but said in a derogatory way.) were located in the basement of the Royal Alcázar until a fire destroyed it. Louis de Rouvroy, duc de Saint-Simon, French ambassador to Spain, described this offices: "from the courtyard of the palace, you can see some doors at street level. You go down several steps and you reach spacious, low, vaulted rooms, most of which are windowless. These places are full of large and small tables, at which a large number of employees write and work without saying a word. The small tables are for the principal officials, who work alone at one table". After the fire of 1734, the Secretariat's services were moved to the now-defunct Buen Retiro Palace, and once the current Royal Palace was finished during the reign of Charles III, they were moved to this building.

In 1901, at the proposal of The Marquess of Aguilar de Campoo, the Council of Ministers moved the headquarters of the Ministry of State to the Palace of Santa Cruz, where it remained until 2000. This palace had previously housed other government offices, including a prison and the Ministry of Overseas.

In 2000, the department's services were moved to the palace located at the number 8 of the Marquess of Salamanca Square, a building that had previously housed the Instituto Nacional de Industria (INI) and the Sociedad Estatal de Participaciones Industriales (SEPI). However, four years later it was ordered to abandon it after becoming uninhabitable, returning to Santa Cruz, although due to the size of the department's services, the vast majority had to be temporarily relocated to the Ágora Towers, in Madrid.

After several delays, in 2016 the Ministry of Finance authorized 69 million euros for a complete renovation of the building, which finally cost 84 million. The move, which among other things consisted of the transfer of more than 1,300 people, took place between October and November 2021.

=== Other places ===
In addition to the main headquarters, the Department of Foreign Affairs has four other headquarters:

- The Palace of Santa Cruz. Although it is no longer the main headquarters, it is still in use.
- Palace of Viana. Official residence of the foreign minister.
- AECID Headquarters. The Spanish Agency for International Development Cooperation has its own headquarters, a building that previously housed the Institute of Hispanic Culture and the Institute of Ibero-American Cooperation. Since the early 2020s, it has also accommodate the Secretariat of State for International Cooperation.
- Headquarters of the Diplomatic School.

== Budget ==
In millions of euros (€)
1. Development cooperation 998 (47.0%)
2. State Foreign Action 855.76 (40.3%)
3. Cultural cooperation 148.4 (6.99%)
4. Administration and general services 97.64 (4.60%)
5. European Union diplomacy 24.4 (1.15%)

For fiscal year 2023, extended to 2026, the Ministry of Foreign Affairs, European Union and Cooperation has a consolidated budget of €2,124 million. Of this amount, 1,277 million are directly managed by the ministry's central services while 847 million are managed by its agencies.

The budget can be divided into five main areas:

1. Development cooperation (Programme 143A), which finances the government development aid programmes.
2. State Foreign Action (142A), which funds the Spanish foreign policy.
3. Cultural cooperation (144A), which comprises all actions related to cultural cooperation, promotion and outreach.
4. Administration and general services (141M & 467G), covering the Ministry's central services and administrative structure.
5. European Union diplomacy (142B), which funds the diplomatic activities within the European Union.

In addition, Programme 000X (“Internal Transfers and Disbursements”) is excluded from the analysis, as it consists of transfers between public sector entities and would otherwise lead to double counting and distort the overall budget.

=== Audit ===
The Ministry's accounts, as well as those of its agencies, are internally audited by the Office of the Comptroller General of the State (IGAE), through a Delegated Comptroller's Office within the Department itself. Externally, the Court of Auditors is responsible for auditing expenditures. Likewise, the Congress of Deputies and Senate Foreign Affairs Committees exercise political control over the accounts.

The Ministry's accounts are also subject to scrutiny by the relevant committees of the Congress of Deputies and the Senate.

== See also ==
- Order of Isabella the Catholic
- Order of Civil Merit
- Ambassadors of Spain
- Foreign relations of Spain
- List of diplomatic missions of Spain
- List of diplomatic missions in Spain

== Bibliography ==
- Fernández Espeso, Carlos; Martínez Cardós, José (1972). Primera Secretaría de Estado. Ministerio de Estado. Disposiciones Orgánicas (1705-1936) [First Secretariat of State. Ministry of State. Organic Rules (1705-1936)] (in Spanish). Vol. 1. Madrid: Technical General Secretariat. pp. X–XXV.
- Badorrey Martín, Beatriz (1999). Los orígenes del Ministerio de Asuntos Exteriores, 1714-1808 [The Origins of the Ministry of Foreign Affairs, 1714–1808] (in Spanish). Madrid: Ministerio de Asuntos Exteriores. pp. 321–329. ISBN 978-84-95265-01-2.
