= Introducer of Ambassadors =

Senior diplomat of Spain

- Introductor de Embajadores
- Coat of arms of Spain

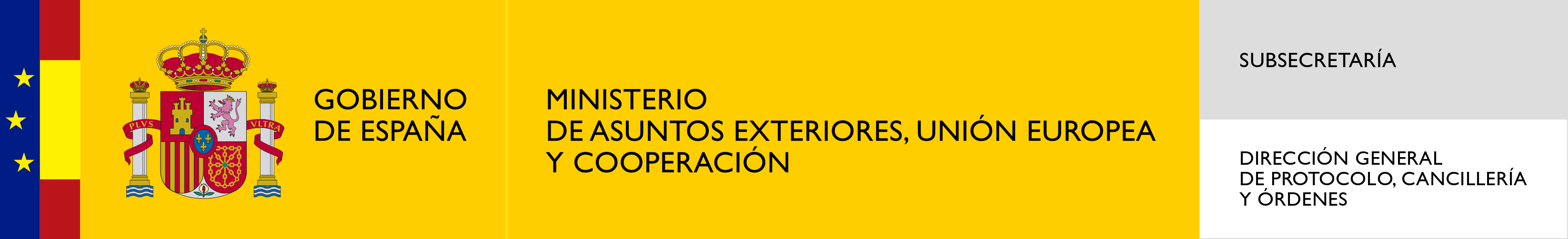

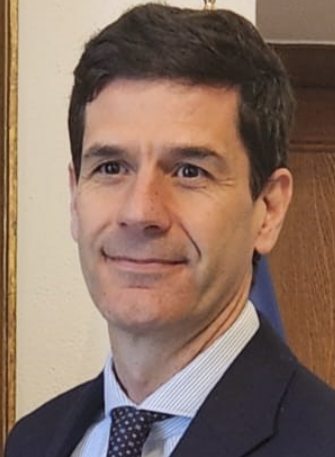
- Incumbent; Adrián Martín Couce since 30 July 2024
- Ministry of Foreign Affairs; Undersecretariat of Foreign Affairs
- Style: The Most Excellent
- Reports to: Under-Secretary of Foreign Affairs
- Nominator: Minister of Foreign Affairs, European Union and Cooperation
- Appointer: The Monarch
- Formation: 1 April 1626; 400 years ago
- Website: exteriores.gob.es

The introducer of ambassadors is a senior diplomat of the Spanish Ministry of Foreign Affairs responsible for introducing new ambassadors to the Monarch. In this sense, the introducer advises the ambassadors and instructs them in the strict protocol of the Spanish court before delivering the diplomatic credentials to the Sovereign. Also, the introducer is the chief of protocol of the Ministry of Foreign Affairs.

It is one of the oldest positions in the Spanish administration, existing since the reign of Philip IV. The introducer holds the category and honors of ambassador and the administrative rank of director-general. The position is currently held by Adrián Martín Couce since 30 July 2024.

== Organization ==
As chief of protocol, the introducer of ambassadors heads the Directorate-General for Protocol, Chancellery and Orders. This directorate-general is structured through two main departments:

- The Deputy Directorate-General for Trips, Official Visits, Ceremonial and Orders, whose chief is the second (or deputy) introducer of ambassadors. It assists the introducer in all matters regarding the preparation of official diplomatic events, both inside and outside Spain, and specifically, on official trips undertaken by the King and Queen of Spain or visits to Spain by foreign heads of state. It is also responsible for the administrative management of the Order of Isabella the Catholic and the Order of Civil Merit.
- The Deputy Directorate-General for Chancellery, which manages everything related with the diplomatic missions accredited in Spain, their consular offices, and international organizations with headquarters or offices in Spain, in compliance with the Vienna Convention on Consular Relations.

To assist the introducer of ambassadors in the performance of its duties, the introducer also has a Support Unit. In total, the Directorate-General for Protocol, Chancellery and Orders has a staff of approximately 40 people.

== History and ceremonial ==
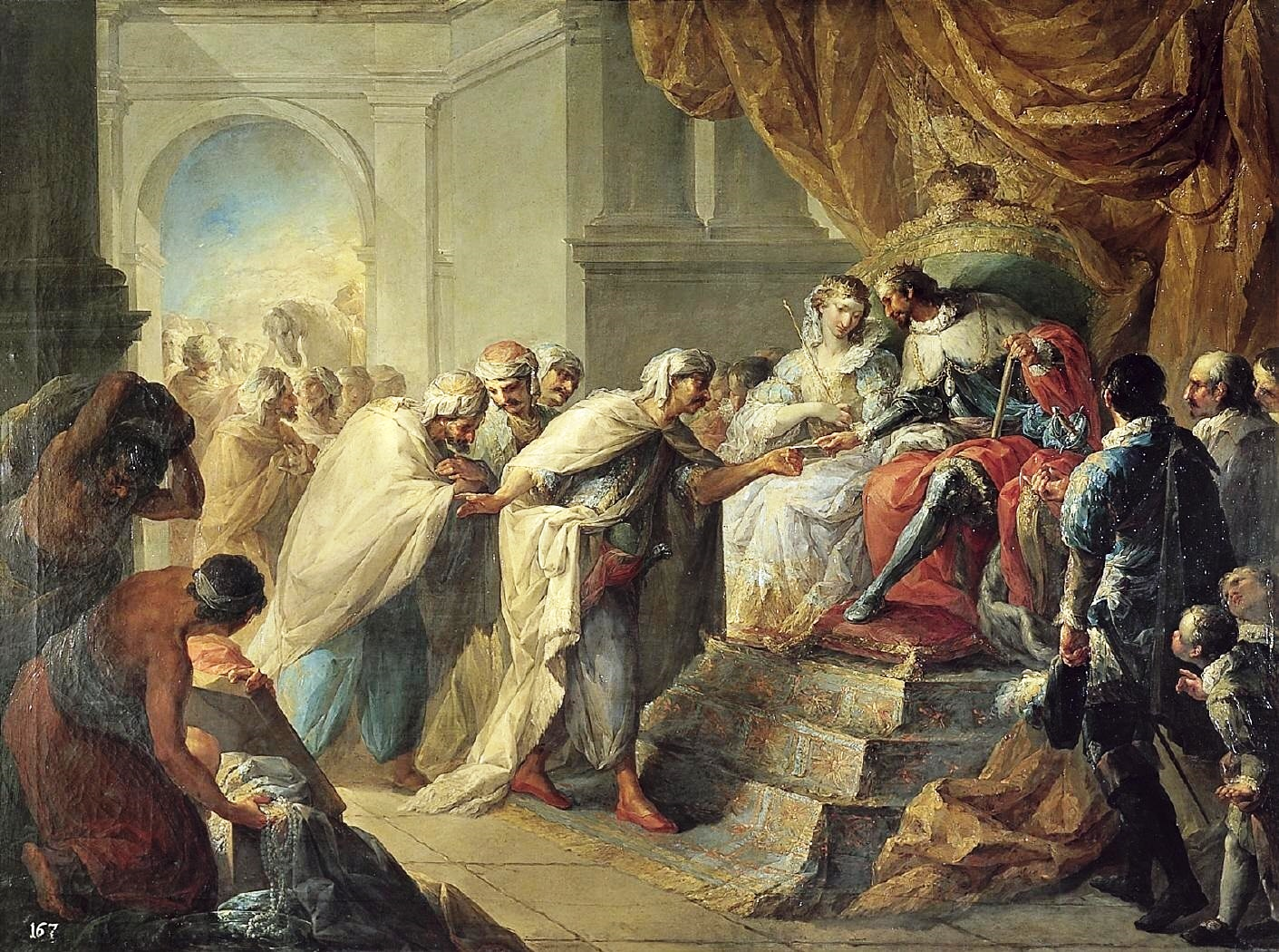
The Catholic Monarchs receiving the ambassador of the King of Fez, by Vicente López Portaña, 1790

In the Kingdom of Castile, the reception of ambassadors sent by other crowns was more relaxed and usually involved the holding of various festive events —jousting, horse races, Juego de cañas, hunting and banquets— which could last for days.

Under Charles I, the etiquette and ceremonial of the Duchy of Burgundy were introduced, with a stricter, more ostentatious, and regal protocol, strengthening the functions of the chief steward, to whom up to eight lesser stewards could report, in addition to numerous other new or redefined positions, such as the chief waiter, who from then on was called the Sumiller de Corps. Likewise, the custom of the monarch eating in public was instituted.

=== The conductor de embajadores and the Habsbourg ceremonial ===
These changes at the royal court also affected diplomatic ceremonies, whose personnel became more specialized. It was during the reign of Philip IV that the position of introducer of ambassadors was established. For this position, "prudent people with experience in business matters and fluent in foreign languages" were sought. Their function was to "guide ambassadors to court, receive them, organize their audiences and provide everything necessary for their care".

During the reign of Philip V, the diplomatic ceremony that had been in use since the previous dynasty was described. It began with the conductor de embajadores (Note: Conductor literally means "driver", but in this contexts means "the person who leads" the ambassadors before the court.), who started the ceremony by receiving the ambassador in a horse-drawn carriage two leagues (about 10 kilometers) from the court, from where he drove him to his lodgings. Once in his chambers, his arrival was communicated to the monarch and the minister of state. The ambassador then handed the minister of state a copy of his letters of credence and explained the purpose of his visit, before setting up the first royal audience. In the case of ambassadors from the Holy Roman Empire first, and those from the Kingdom of France later, the reception by the monarch took place on the day of their arrival, as they received preferential treatment as "domestic ambassadors", that is, representatives of the family.

Once the date was set, the chief steward would inform the conductor so he could make the necessary preparations. On the day, the chief steward (today known as the Head of the King's Household) and the most senior gentleman of the House, representing the Royal Household, would fetch the ambassador from his residence, and from there, the procession would head to the Royal Palace. According to protocol, the order of the procession was as follows: 1. Ambassador's carriage, accompanied by the conductor de embajadores; 2. Carriage of the representatives of the King's Household; 3. Carriage of the ambassador's companions, all flanked by halberdiers. Once inside the palace, two bows were made: one upon entering the hall and another close to the king, at which point the ambassador could approach and present his credentials. After the meeting, he had to leave the hall without turning his back on the sovereign.

The ambassador then met the Queen and her staff and the rest of the royal family. After these, he returned to his residence following the same protocol as when he arrived. Finally, in the afternoon, he met with the minister of state. At all times, the ambassador was accompanied and guided by the conductor de embajadores.

This figure has remained unchanged over the last four centuries, with two exceptions. The first was its name change, since, from the reign of Charles III onwards, it was called introductor de embajadores (lit. 'introducer of ambassadors'), as he not only guided them through the process, but also introduced or present them to the monarch. The second, because it was briefly suppressed between March 1873 and September 1874, during the First Spanish Republic, defined at the time as a "useless wheel" of administration, "purely apparatus and of no use".

=== The ceremony during the Restoration ===
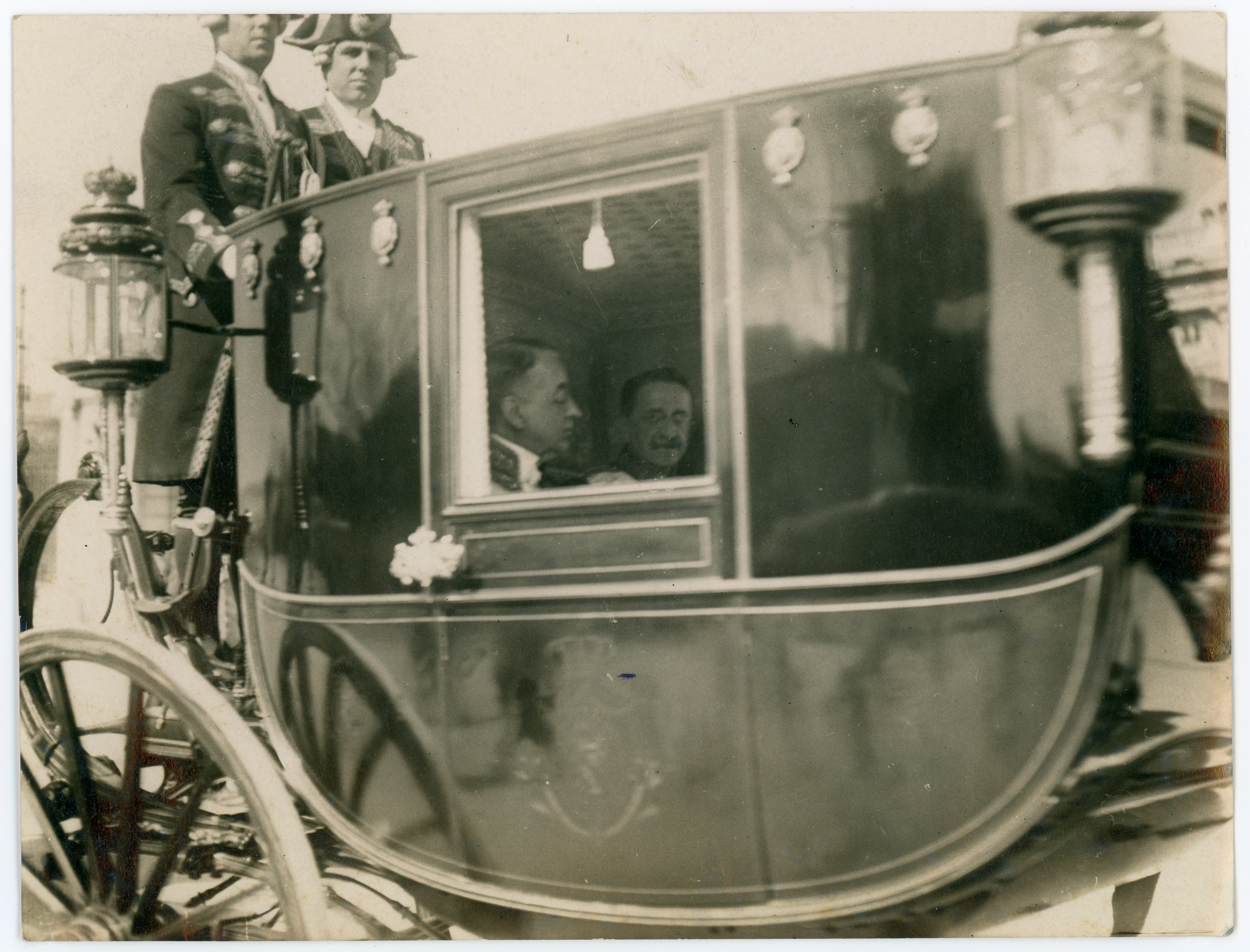
Romania's new plenipotentiary minister to Spain, Victor Antonescu, heads to the palace, accompanied by Count of Velle, the introducer of ambassadors, to present his credentials to King Alfonso XIII. 1925

In February 1875, King Alfonso XII reformed the ceremony. First, in accordance with the provisions of the Congress of Vienna of 1815, different ceremonies were established for each type of ambassador. Ambassadors, legates, nuncios, and envoys were welcomed by the sovereign, while chargé d'affaires were accredited by the minister of state. The king received the former in the Throne Room, while the latter in the antechamber, where the presentation of credentials and the audience also took place.

The ambassador was no longer received two leagues away by the introducer of ambassadors, but instead arrived at his residence by his own means and notified the minister of state of his arrival, also sending him a copy of his credentials. At that point, the minister informed the palace steward and the introducer, who then arranged the event.

Thus, on the day of the royal audience, the introducer would go to fetch the ambassador at his residence, with a similar order of procession. Once in the Plaza de la Armería, the ambassador was received with full honors and, before entering the royal chamber, he was announced by the introducer of ambassadors. At this time, three bows were made: upon entering, in the middle of the hall, and in front of the throne. After the speeches by the ambassador and the king, the ambassador presented the letters of credence, which the king then gave to the minister of state, and the ambassador was invited and accompanied by the monarch to visit the queen. After the audiences, the ambassador returned to its embassy in the same manner as he came.

=== The ceremony today ===
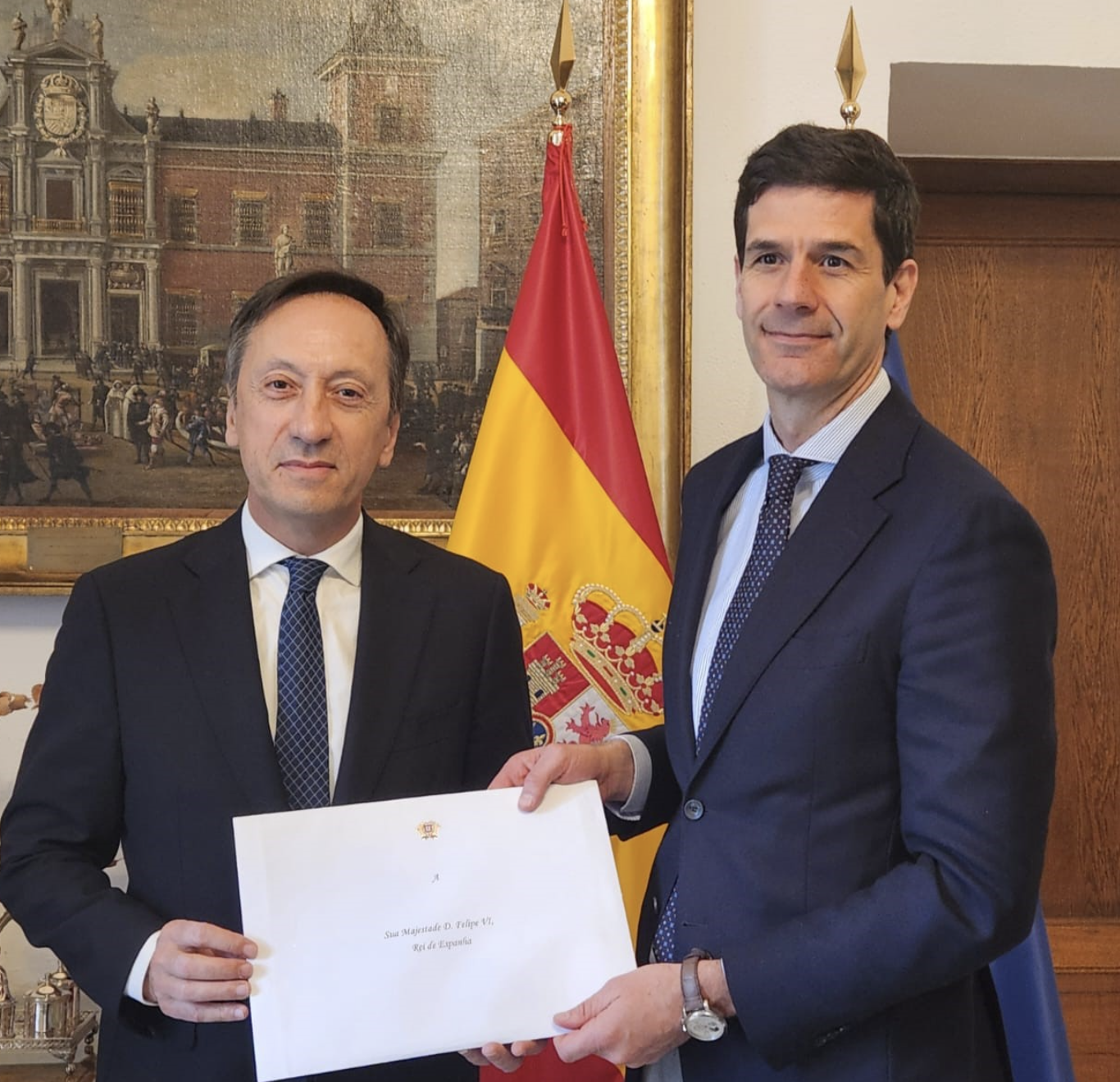
The Portuguese ambassador, José Augusto Duarte, presents the copies of the credentials to the introducer of ambassadors. 2025

The 1875 rules continues to be the basis for presenting credentials, although with some differences; since between four and six ambassadors can present their credentials in one day, the introducer no longer accompanies them individually throughout the act, but rather this is done by lower-ranking diplomats and the introducer only initially explains the act to them and, on the agreed day, introduces them to Their Majesties.

Thus, after being picked up by an official from the Ministry of Foreign Affairs at the residence or embassy, he is taken to the office of the introducer of ambassadors in the Santa Cruz Palace. During the meeting, the ambassador delivers the appropriate copy of the credentials and the letter of recall of the previous ambassador, while the introducer explains the ceremony observed in Spain for presenting the credentials to the sovereign. After formally requesting a date for the public audience to present the credentials, the ambassador returns to the embassy.

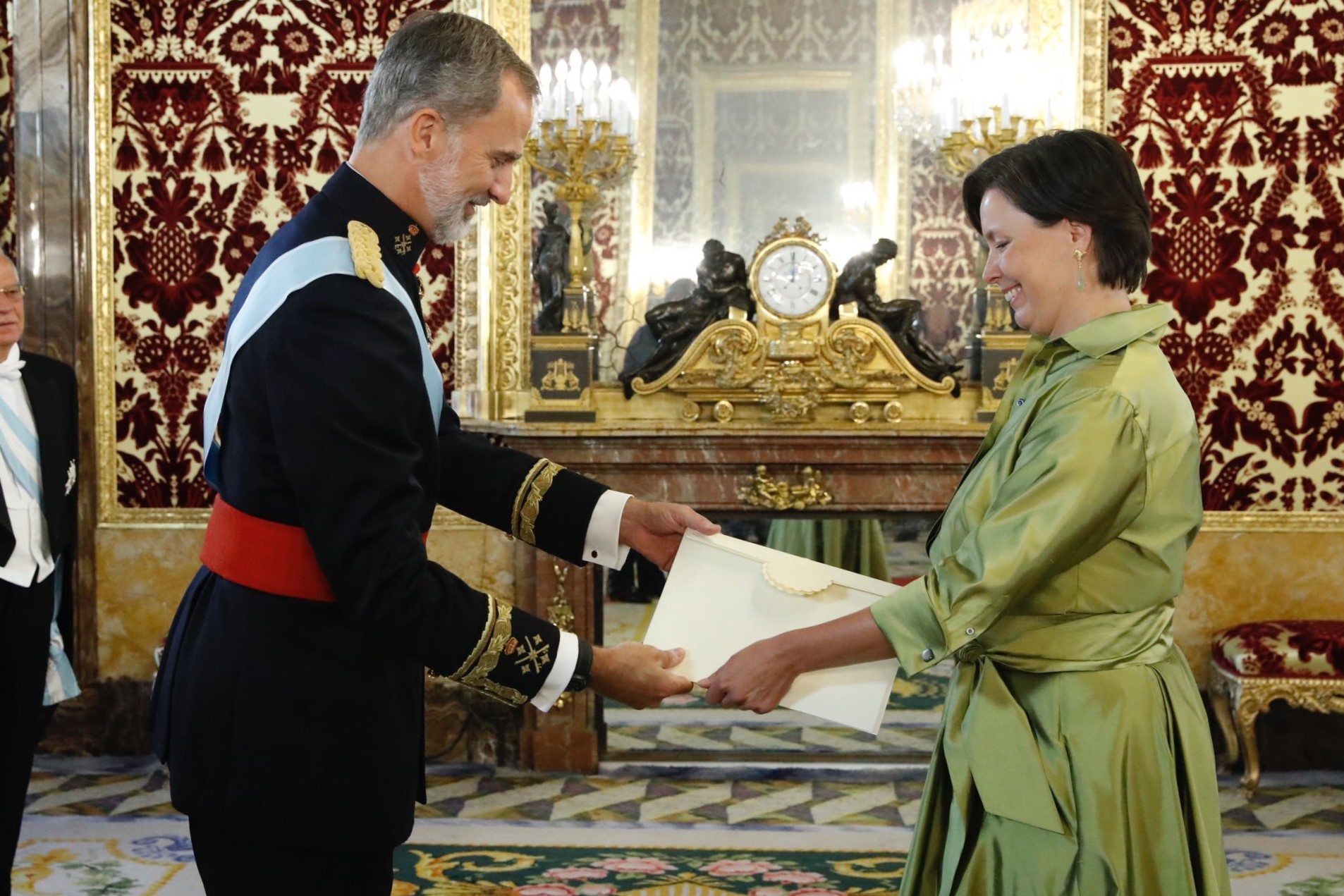
Estonian ambassador Mariin Ratnik presents her credentials to King Felipe VI. 2019

On the day agreed upon for the delivery of the letters, a ministry official again picks up the ambassador and accompanies them to the Santa Cruz Palace, where they are received at the Ambassadors' Hall by senior diplomatic officials. After a meeting with high-ranking officials from the ministry, the carriages and honor guard, led by the Royal Guard, await them upon their departure, escorting them to the palace. All personnel wear uniforms from the reign of Charles III. He is received with honors and the playing of his national anthem in the Plaza de la Armería.

At the entrance to the palace, he is greeted by the introducer of ambassadors, who guides him to the Official Chamber of the Royal Palace and announces him before the Sovereign. The ambassador then bows first at the entrance and again in front of the monarch. Without a speech (although a brief self-introduction may be made), the diplomat hands over the credentials, which the king in turn gives to the foreign minister. After introducing the rest of the delegation accompanying the ambassador to the monarch, the ambassador is invited to a private audience in the Nuncio's Room, accompanied by the foreign minister. Finally, the ambassador is honorably dismissed from the palace, returning to the embassy using their own means.

== List of introducers ==
To compile this list, Appendix 1 of the work "History of the Spanish Diplomacy" by diplomat and historian Miguel Ángel Ochoa Brun is used (until 2000). Since then, official appointments published in the Official State Gazette have been used.

Name	Term	Name	Term
Andrés Velázquez de Velasco	c. 1620	Ramón María Bazo y Cottela	1861–1866
Francisco Zapata	c. 1626	The Marquess of Selva Alegre	1866–1868
Cristóbal de Gabiria Zubizarreta		The Viscount consort of Cerro de las Palmas	1868–1873
Diego de Saavedra Fajardo	c. 1648	The Marquess of Selva Alegre	1874–1879
Pedro Roco de Villagutiérrez	c. 1663	The Marquess of Zarco	1879–1904
Alonso Antonio de Paz y Guzmán	c. 1667	The Count of Pie de Concha	1904–1914
Francisco de Lira y Castillo	1667–1668	José Quiñones de León	1914
Manuel de Lira y Castillo	1668–1671	Emilio Heredia y Livermore	1914–1915
The Marquess of Villasierra	1671–1674	Alejandro Padilla y Bell	1915
Pedro de Ribera	1674–1677	Emilio Heredia y Livermore	1915–1917
Juan de Isasi Idiáquez	1677–1686	The Count of Velle	1917–1927
Francisco de Oliveras y Murillo	1686	The Duke of Vistahermosa	1927–1931
Carlos Francisco del Castillo	1686–1708	Rafael López-Lago y Estolt	1931–1937
José de Sobremonte y Carnero; Count of Villafranca del Gaytán	1708–1729	Amós Salvador Carreras	1937–1938
Joaquín de Sobremonte; Count of Villafranca del Gaytán	1730–1756	Cipriano Rivas Cherif	1938–1939
The Marquess of Ovieco	1756–1789	The Marquess of Desio	1938
Estanislao de Velasco y Coello	1789–1795	The Baron of Torres	1938–1964
José Chacón	1795–1806	The Count of Villacieros	1964–1970
Antonio de Castilla y Casasús	1806–1808	The Duke consort of Amalfi	1970–1971
Ventura Ortiz de Guinea, a.i.	1808	Santiago Tabanera Ruiz	1971–1972
José Martínez de Hervás	1808–1809	Emilio Pan de Soraluce y Olmos	1972–1976
Carlos Sebastián Ferrero Fieschi y de Rohan	1809	Manuel Alabart Miranda	1976–1982
The Count of Canillas	1810–1812	José Antonio de Urbina y de la Quintana	1982–1990
Diego de la Cuadra y López de la Huerta, a.i.	1812	María Cristina Barrios Almazor	1990–1998
The Count of Canillas	1812–1831	José Luis de la Peña Vela	1998–2000
Andrés Villalba	1831–1834	Juan Manuel de Barandica y Luxán	2000–2004
The Count of Sevilla la Nueva	1834–1836	Raimundo Pérez-Hernández y Torra	2004–2008
The Count of Canillas	1836–1838	Francisco Javier Vallaure de Acha	2008–2011
The Count of Sevilla la Nueva	1838–1840	José María Rodríguez Coso	2011–2014
The Count of Canillas	1840–1843	Juan Sunyé Mendía	2014–2017
Antonio María Pinel Ceballos	1843–1845	María Sáenz de Heredia y Alonso	2017–2018
The Count of Sevilla la Nueva	1843–1845	Caridad Batalla Junco	2018–2021
The Count of Sevilla la Nueva	1845–1852	María Sebastián de Erice	2021–2024
Diego de Biedma y Fonseca	1852–1861	Adrián Martín Couce	2024–pres.
Ramón María Bazo y Cottela	1861–1866		

== Bibliography ==
- Lobeto Álvarez, Ana María (2022). "La ceremonia de entrega de cartas credenciales en España y otros ejemplos en algunos países del espacio panibérico" [The credential presentation ceremony in Spain and other examples in some countries of the Pan-Iberian region]. Revista de Estudios institucionales (in Spanish). 9 (17): 25–59. doi:10.5944/eeii.vol.9.n.17.2022.36141. ISSN 2386-8694 – via UNED.
- Rabasco Ferreira, Rafael (2017). "Protocolo y ceremonial en la presentación de cartas credenciales, en el ámbito de las relaciones diplomáticas" [Protocol and ceremony in the presentation of credentials, in the field of diplomatic relations]. Revista Estudios Institucionales (in Spanish). 4 (6): 29–48 – via UNED.
