= Under-Secretary of Foreign Affairs =

Senior civil servant who runs the Spanish Foreign Ministry on a day-to-day basis

- Subsecretario de Asuntos Exteriores
- Coat of arms of Spain

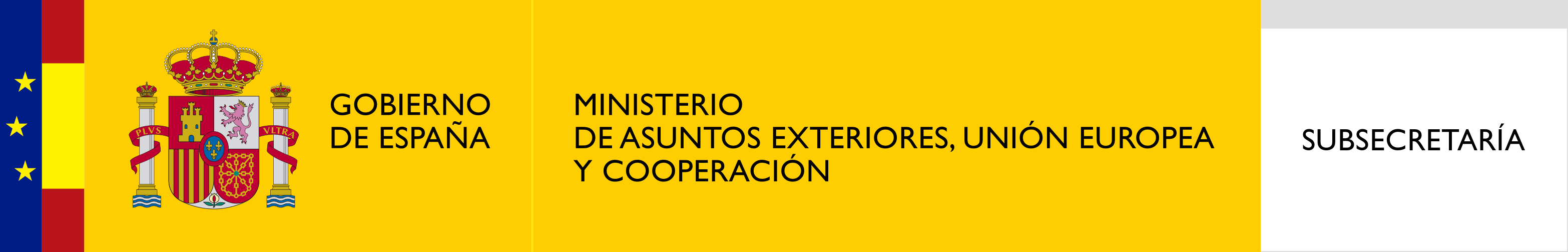

- Incumbent; Sergio Cuesta Francisco since 30 September 2026
- Ministry of Foreign Affairs; Undersecretariat of Foreign Affairs
- Style: The Most Excellent (formal); Mr. Under-Secretary (informal)
- Nominator: The Foreign Minister
- Appointer: The Monarch
- Formation: 16 June 1834; 192 years ago
- First holder: Andrés Villalba
- Website: exteriores.gob.es

The under-secretary of foreign affairs, called in the past under-secretary of state, is a government official within the Spanish Ministry of Foreign Affairs responsible for assisting the minister in the daily management of the department. In this regard, the under-secretary supervises the department's policies concerning legal and consular assistance, human resources, protocol, budget and training of new diplomats. As responsible for human resources, the under-secretary is the head of the Diplomatic Service and has the rank and honors of ambassador. It is appointed by the Monarch on the advice of the foreign minister.

Until the establishment of the position of secretary of state for foreign affairs in 1979, the under-secretary was second-in-command to the minister, having political responsibilities. Nowadays, it is a technical position, held by a diplomat or a senior civil servant. This position is comparable to the permanent secretary in some countries or the Under Secretary of State for Management in the United States.

The under-secretary is the chancellor of the Ministry's orders: the Order of Isabella the Catholic and the Order of Civil Merit.

== History ==
The office of under-secretary was established by Royal Decree of Maria Christina of Bourbon-Two Sicilies, The Queen Regent, of 16 June 1834. This norm created the position for all government departments in order to assist and lighten the minister's workload. On June 26, Andrés Villalba, introducer of ambassadors, was appointed the first under-secretary of the Ministry of State.

For much of its history, the Undersecretariat has been structured around two sections: one for Policy and another for Trade and Consulates. Over time, these two sections were divided and specialized by subject. By the end of the 19th century, we can find up to eleven different sections, some dedicated to foreign policy (Europe; the Americas; Asia, Africa and Oceania; Trade; and Pious Work) and others to technical and administrative matters (Accounting, Chancellery, Consulates, Archives, etc.).

In the 1930s the sections were renamed as directorates-general and the political ones were directly attached to the minister, although, as the second highest ranking official, the under-secretary continued to act as coordinator of the rest of the department's senior officials. The creation of the secretariats of state —foreign affaris, European Union and international cooperation— between the 1970s and the 1980s relegated this officer to a mere internal affairs manager.

== Organization ==
The Undersecretariat is organized as follows:

Undersecretariat Organization (2026)
Under-Secretary	Technical Cabinet
Under-Secretary	Inspectorate-General of Services
Under-Secretary	Budget Office
Under-Secretary	International Legal Advice Office
Under-Secretary	Diplomatic School
Under-Secretary	Pious Work of the Holy Places
Under-Secretary	Office for the Protection of Classified Information
Introducer of Ambassadors	Deputy Directorate-General for Trips, Official Visits, Ceremonial and Orders
Introducer of Ambassadors	Deputy Directorate-General for Chancellery
Technical Secretary-General	Deputy Technical Secretary-General
Technical Secretary-General	Deputy Directorate-General for Institutional Relations and Regional Collaboration
Technical Secretary-General	Deputy Directorate-General for Treaties and Other International Agreements
Technical Secretary-General	Division for Appeals and Relations with the Courts
Technical Secretary-General	Language Interpretation Office
Directorate-General for the Foreign Service	Administrative Office
Directorate-General for the Foreign Service	Deputy Directorate-General for Personnel
Directorate-General for the Foreign Service	Deputy Directorate-General for Financial Administration
Directorate-General for the Foreign Service	Deputy Directorate-General for Properties
Directorate-General for the Foreign Service	Deputy Directorate-General for IT, Communications and Networks
Directorate-General for the Foreign Service	Division for Control and Management Improvement
Directorate-General for Spaniards Abroad and Consular Affairs	Deputy Directorate-General for Consular Protection and Assistance
Directorate-General for Spaniards Abroad and Consular Affairs	Deputy Directorate-General for Consular Legal Affairs
Directorate-General for Spaniards Abroad and Consular Affairs	Deputy Directorate-General for Visas and Travel Documents
Directorate-General for Spaniards Abroad and Consular Affairs	Division for Consular Emergencies

== List of under-secretaries ==
Since 1834, these has been the people who served as under-secretaries:

Under-Secretary		Term	Under-Secretary		Term
1	Andrés Villalba	1834 – 1835	53	Eugenio Ferraz y Alcalá Galiano	1913 – 1918
2	Julián Villalba	1835 – 1836	-	Juan Pérez-Caballero y Ferrer	1918 – 1919
-	Gabriel José García, a.i.	1836 – 1838	54	Emilio de Palacios y Fau	1919 – 1923
-	Julián Villalba, a.i.	1838 – 1839	55	Fernando Espinosa de los Monteros	1923 – 1927
-	José García Pérez de Castro, a.i.	1839 – 1840	56	Bernardo Almeida y Herreros	1927 – 1929
3	Hipólito de los Hoyos	1840 – 1843	57	Emilio de Palacios y Fau	1929 – 1930
4	Francisco María Martín	1843 – 1846	58	Domingo de las Bárcenas	1930 – 1931
5	The Count of San Luis	1846	59	Francisco Agramonte Cortijo	1931 – 1932
6	Antonio Caballero	1846 – 1851	60	Justo Gómez Ocerín	1932 – 1933
7	Luis López de la Torre Ayllón y Kirsmacker	1851	61	Antonio de la Cruz Marín	1933
8	Antonio Riquelme	1851 – 1853	62	Manuel Aguirre de Cárcer	1933
9	Antonio Caballero	1853 – 1854	63	José María Doussinague	1933 – 1934
10	Juan Antoine y Zayas	1854 – 1855	64	José María Aguinaga y Barona	1934 – 1936
-	Jacinto Albístur, a.i.	1855	65	Rafael de Ureña y Sanz	1936
-	Miguel de los Santos Álvarez, a.i.	1855 – 1856	-	Valeriano Casanueva Picazo (Note: Under-Secretary of the Republican Ministry of State)	1936 – 1937
11	Augusto Ulloa y Castañón	1856	-	Alfredo Nistal Martínez	1937
-	Tomás Ligués, a.i.	1856	-	Carlos Esplá	1937 – 1938
12	The Marquess of Valmar	1856 – 1857	-	José Quero Morales	1938
13	Juan Tomás Comyn	1857 – 1862	-	Pablo de Tremoya y Alzaga	1938
14	Tomás Ligués	1863 – 1864	-	Eugenio Espinosa de los Monteros (Note: Under-Secretary of the Rebel Ministry of State.)	1938 – 1939
15	Miguel de los Santos Bañuelos	1864 – 1865	-	José Quero Morales	1938 – 1939
16	The Count of Casa Valencia	1865 – 1866	-	Domingo de las Bárcenas	1939
17	Facundo Goñi	1866 – 1867	66	Juan Peche y Cabeza de Vaca	1939 – 1941
18	Rafael Jabat Hernández de Alba	1867 – 1868	67	José Pan de Soraluce y Español	1941 – 1944
19	The Count of Xiquena	1868	68	Cristóbal del Castillo y Campos	1944 – 1945
20	Juan Valera y Alcalá-Galiano	1868 – 1869	69	Tomás Suñer Ferrer	1945 – 1947
21	Eduardo Gasset y Artime	1869 – 1870	70	The Count of Casa Miranda	1947 – 1951
22	Bonifacio de Blas y Muñoz	1870 – 1871	71	The Count of Navasqüés	1951 – 1955
23	Pío Gullón	1871 – 1872	72	The Marquess consort of Santa Cruz	1955 –1958
24	Manuel Merelo y Calvo	1872 – 1873	73	Pedro Cortina Mauri	1958 – 1966
25	Miguel Morayta y Sagrario	1873	74	Germán Burriel Rodríguez	1966 – 1968
26	Tomás Rodríguez Pinilla	1873	75	Gonzalo Fernández de la Mora	1970
27	Melchor Almagro Díaz	1873 – 1874	76	Gabriel Fernández Valderrama	1970 – 1974
28	Pío Gullón	1874 – 1875	77	Juan José Rovira	1974 – 1975
29	Cayo Quiñones de León	1875	78	The Marquess of Oreja	1975 – 1976
30	Rafael Ferraz	1875 – 1881	79	Miguel Solano Aza	1976 – 1978
-	Jacobo Prendergast y Gorgón, a.i.	1881	80	José Joaquín Puig de la Bellacasa	1978 – 1980
31	Felipe Méndez de Vigo	1881 – 1883	81	Joaquín Ortega Salinas	1980 – 1982
32	José Gutiérrez de Agüera	1883 – 1884	82	Leoncio Gonzalo Puente Ojea	1982 – 1985
33	Rafael Ferraz	1884 – 1885	83	Fernando Perpiñá-Robert Peyra	1985 – 1988
34	José Gutiérrez de Agüera	1885 – 1888	84	Inocencio Arias	1988 – 1991
35	Francisco Rafael Figuera	1888 – 1889	85	Máximo Cajal López	1991 – 1994
36	José Fernández Jiménez	1889 – 1890	86	Jesús Ezquerra Calvo	1994 – 1996
37	Rafael Ferraz	1890 – 1892	87	José de Carvajal Salido	1996 – 2000
38	José Fernández Jiménez	1892 – 1893	88	Carlos Carderera Soler	2000 – 2002
-	José Gutiérrez de Agüera, a.i.	1893	89	José Pedro Sebastián de Erice	2002 – 2003
39	Joaquín Valera y Aceituno	1893 – 1894	90	María Victoria Morera	2003 – 2004
40	The Marquess of Villa-Urrutia	1894 – 1895	91	Luis Calvo Merino	2004 – 2007
41	Rafael Ferraz	1895 – 1897	92	María Jesús Figa	2007 – 2010
42	José Gutiérrez de Agüera	1897 – 1898	93	Antonio López Martínez	2010 – 2012
43	Luis Polo de Bernabé	1898 – 1899	94	Rafael Mendívil Peydro	2012 – 2014
44	The Duke of Arcos	1899	95	Cristóbal González-Aller Jurado	2014 – 2017
45	Enrique Dupuy de Lóme y Paulín	1899 – 1900	96	Beatriz Larrotcha Palma	2017 – 2018
46	Juan Pérez-Caballero y Ferrer	1900 – 1903	97	Ángeles Moreno Bau	2018 – 2020
47	Antonio de Castro y Casaléiz	1903 – 1905	98	María Celsa Nuño García	2020 – 2021
48	Emilio de Ojeda y Perpiñán	1905 – 1906	99	Luis Manuel Cuesta Civís	2021 – 2024
49	Julio de Arellano y Arróspide	1906 – 1907	100	Xavier Martí Martí	2024– 2026
50	The Marquess of Herrera	1907 – 1909	101	Sergio Cuesta Francisco	Since 2026
51	Ramón Piña y Millet	1909 – 1911			
52	Manuel González-Hontoria	1911 – 1913			

== See also ==
- Ambassadors of Spain
- List of diplomatic missions of Spain
- List of diplomatic missions in Spain
