= Antonio Ponz =

Spanish painter (1725–1792)

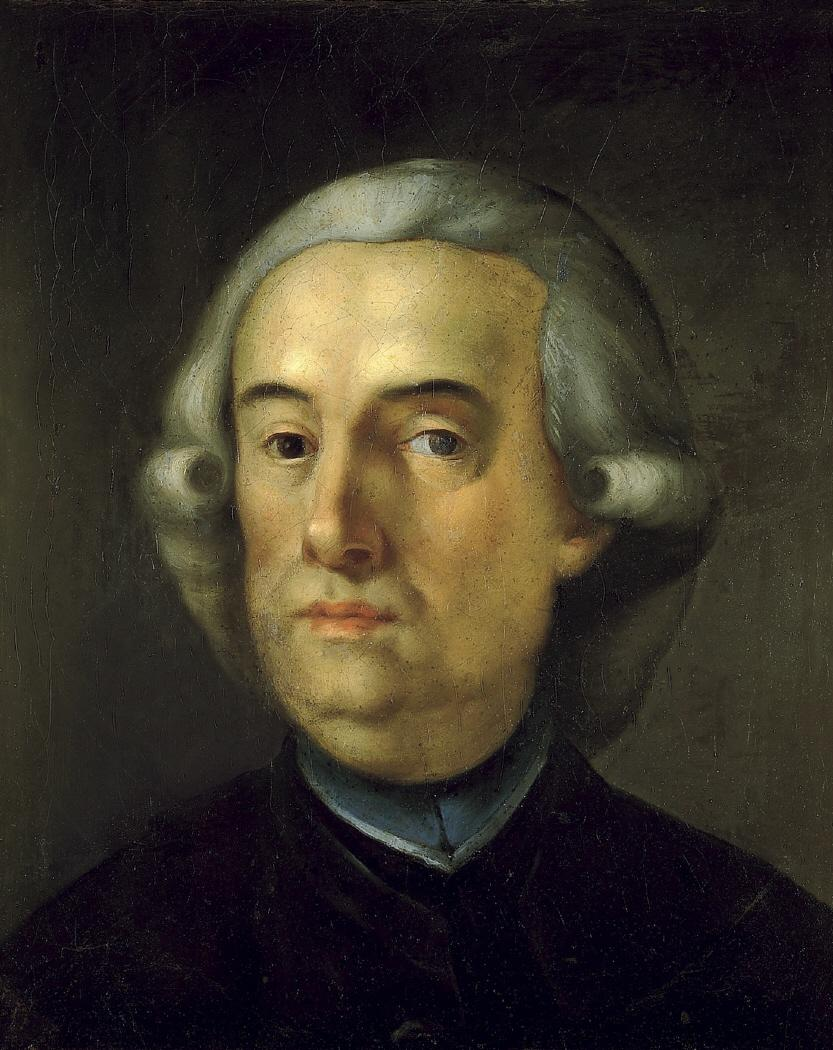
"Self Portrait", c. 1774, oil on canvas, Madrid, Real Academia de Bellas Artes de San Fernando.

Antonio Ponz Piquer (1725 – 4 December 1792) was a Spanish painter.

He was born at Bejís in the province of Castellón. He was a pupil of Antonio Richarte at Valencia, then in 1746 moved to Madrid, where he studied for five years. He then went to Rome, but soon returned to help in repainting and compilation of the artworks at El Escorial. In 1771 he made a journey through Spain. In 1776 he was appointed secretary of the Royal Academy of San Fernando. He was a member of many of the art academies in the Peninsula. He wrote Comentarios de la Pintura and several other works.

== Biography ==
Ponz received a comprehensive education in the humanities, arts and theology at Segorbe, University of Valencia, Gandia and the School of the Three Arts in Madrid. He lived in Italy between 1751 and 1760, where he expanded his knowledge of art. There he met Pedro Francisco Jiménez de Góngora y Luján, Duke of Almodovar, who would become Director of the Spanish Royal Academy of History (1792–1794) and formed a friendship with Anton Raphael Mengs. He studied classical art under Johann Joachim Winckelmann and history with Francisco Pérez Bayer. He settled in Rome and visited Naples in 1759 to view the newly discovered ruins of Pompeii and Herculaneum.

In 1773 he was elected scholar of history and in 1776 Secretary of the Real Academia de Bellas Artes de San Fernando was also a fellow of the Royal Basque Economic Society and the Economic society of Madrid, among other distinctions.

Antonio Ponz was a key figure in Bourbon cultural policy and worked on the collection of works and relics of the Library of El Escorial, and was curator of the portrait gallery for which he made copies of some works by Italian masters.

== Viaje de Espana (Journey around Spain) ==
Commissioned by Pedro Rodríguez, Conde de Campomanes Ponz made a famous trip around Spain to inspect the artistic treasures of Andalucia that had belonged to the Jesuits, recently expelled from Spain by Carlos III (1767).

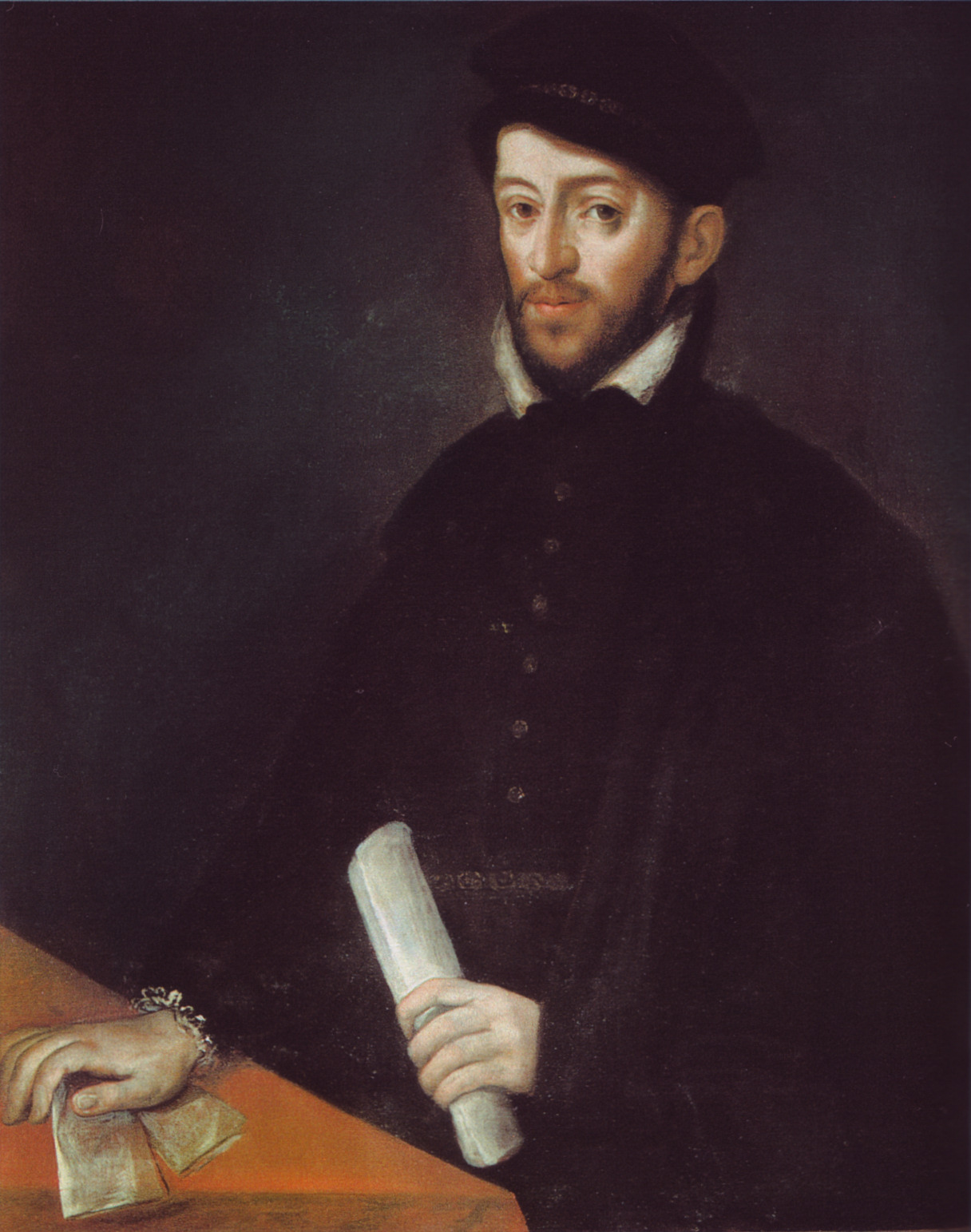
Portrait of Antonio Pérez, secretary of King Philip II by Antonio Ponz, Monastery of San Lorenzo de El Escorial

Subsequently, Ponz published his famous Voyage around Spain (Viage de España), a collection of letters in which there is news of the most significant events worthy of knowing. The work began in 1772 and was printed in the workshop of Joaquín Ibarra, although as a precaution, the author published the first two under an assumed name. According to his nephew Joseph Ponz this was, at the request of the Eugenio de Llaguno Duke of Almodóvar and Francisco Pérez Bayer among others. An eighteenth volume was printed posthumously in 1794 which referred to Cádiz, Málaga and other towns in Andalucia.

This work was not just an inventory of monuments and a documentary report on the conservation of artistic, epigraphic, and pictorial heritage, but also covered sculpture and architecture and other fixed works of significance that he saw in the course of his voyage. His description of them is strongly influenced by the Renaissance and Neoclassical movements and offer a much broader vision than other writers on many aspects of social reality in the country at the time, albeit with less detail than Eugenio Larruga.

From some of the early volumes published it is easy to see he did not like the situation in the country, because it was thinly inhabited and little or poorly exploited. He noted that domestic markets were poorly served and sensed a certain crisis in artistic creation in relation to other, more enlightened times. This was during the second half of the sixteenth century and the first half of the seventeenth century, and Ponz deplored the excesses of the Baroque style. In recognition of his work King Carlos III granted him the ecclesiastical revenues of the Stipend of Cuervo from the Archbishop of Toledo, and used his influence to have him appointed as the Secretary of the Academy of San Fernando (1776).

In 1785 Ponz published Voyage beyond Spain (Viaje fuera de España) which documented the tour he took around Europe in 1783 with the dual purpose of defending Spain from adverse travel reviews and contributing external philosophical ideas to the economic, social and artistic evolution within Spain. It is a journey representing the aspirations and tensions of enlightened reformers. Under the critical spotlight he was to flourish in the light and shadow of the French Revolution. He also sampled the economic and social dynamism and political freedom of Britain, the intellectual and religious tolerance in the United Provinces and the bitter memories of the Spanish occupation of The Netherlands. Although his work is concerned primarily with artistic description, it also includes reflections on the economy, as well as the social and religious life abroad, and, more darkly, the foreign policies in the territories visited.

Assigned to moderate reformism and no supporter of breaks, Antonia Ponz advocated for economic development and patronage, in the progress of the country, while avoiding reference to sociability and everyday life.

== Works ==
- Voyage around Spain, or letters in which there is news of the most significant and worthy of knowing Published by Ibarra, Madrid, 1772–1794, in 18 volumes "Octavo" format (About 107x157mm):
  - Volume I: Madrid, Toledo, Aranjuez, Alcalá de Henares, Guadalajara, Huete.
  - Volume II: Madrid, Escorial, Guisando.
  - Volume III: Cuenca, Madrid, Arganda, Ucles, Huete, Requena, Valencia, Chelva.
  - Volume IV: Valencia, Segorbe, Murviedro, Xativa, Almansa.
  - Volume V: Madrid.
  - Volume VI: Real Madrid and sites immediately.
  - Volume VII: Madrid, Talavera de la Reina, Guadalupe, Talavera la Vieja, Plasencia Yuste, Trujillo, Medellín, Las Batuecas Hurdes, Plasencia.
  - Volume VIII: Plasencia, Bejar, Coria, Oliva, Alcántara, Cáceres, Mérida, Montijo, Badajoz, Jerez de los Caballeros, Fregenal, Zafra, Cantillana, Santiponce, Triana.
  - Volume IX: Sevilla.
  - Volume X: Alcobendas, Torrelaguna, Buitrago, San Ildefonso, Segovia.
  - Volume XI: Cuellar, Montemayor, Tudela, Valladolid, Palencia, Carrion de los Condes, Sahagún, León, Monsoon, Aguilar de Campo, Torquemada.
  - Volume XII: Burgos, Lerma, Aranda de Duero, Ampudia, Medina de Rioseco, Tordesillas, Medina del Campo, Salamanca, Alba de Tormes, Avila, Ciudad Rodrigo.
  - Volume XIII: Hita, Sigüenza, Medinaceli, Calatayud, Molina de Aragón, Teruel, Caudiel, Villareal, Castellón de la Plana, Torreblanca, Alcalá de Chisvert, Benicarló, Peñíscola, Ulldecona, Tortosa, Tarragona.
  - Volume XIV: Barcelona, Mataro, Girona, Montserrat, Martorell, pregnant, Igualada, Solsona, Cervera, Lleida.
  - Volume XV: Zaragoza, Daroca.
  - Volume XVI: Aranjuez, Ocaña, Valdepeñas, Consuegra, Ciudad Real, Almagro, Linares Baeza, Ubeda, Jaén, Arjona, Bailen, Córdoba.
  - Volume XVII: Córdoba, Ecija, Lucena, Carmona, Seville, Utrera, Jerez de la Frontera, Cádiz.
  - Volume XVIII: Cádiz, Chiclana, Puerto de Santa Maria, Medina Sidonia, Tarifa, Gibraltar, Ronda, Sanlucar de Barrameda, Lebrija, Osuna, Antequera, Malaga, Alhama.
- Travel outside of Spain,1785, 2 vols. (For the Netherlands, England, Holland, Belgium and France)

The two works have been reissued together in the twentieth century in two editions of the 20 volumes: the first in "Ponz, Antonio:Tour of Spain, followed by two volumes of traveling outside of Spain. Preparation, introduction and additional indices by Casto Maria del Rivero, Madrid, Editorial Aguilar, 1947 reprinted in 1988 and the second, a facsimile edition of 20 volumes published in Madrid by the publisher Atlas, in 1973, which reproduces the latest edition of the eighteenth century edition without comment or annotation.
