= Julián Villalba =

Spanish politician and civil servant

The Most Excellent Juan Villalba
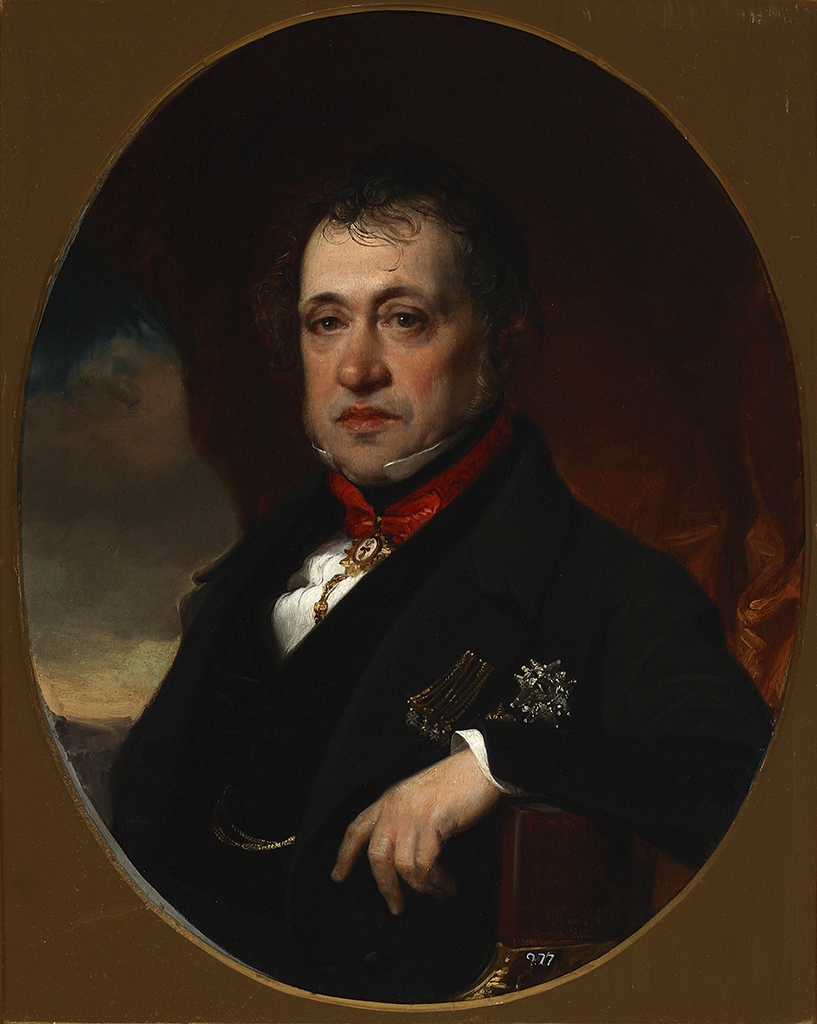
- Portrait of Julian Villalba, by Federico de Madrazo y Kuntz. 1842

Acting Prime Minister of Spain
- In office 14 September 1835 – 17 September 1835
- Monarch: Isabella II
- Preceded by: The Count of Toreno
- Succeeded by: Juan Álvarez Mendizábal

Acting Minister of State
- In office 14 September 1835 – 17 September 1835
- Monarch: Isabella II
- Preceded by: The Count of Toreno
- Succeeded by: Juan Álvarez Mendizábal

Under-Secretary of State
- In office 19 January 1838 – 19 February 1839
- Monarch: Isabella II
- Preceded by: Gabriel José García
- Succeeded by: José García Pérez de Castro
- In office 21 June 1835 – 10 August 1836
- Preceded by: Andrés Villalba
- Succeeded by: Gabriel José García

Member of the Congress of Deputies for Cádiz
- In office 13 February 1838 – 1 June 1839

Personal details
- Born: 28 January 1785 Zaragoza, Spain
- Died: 23 November 1843 (aged 58) Rome, Papal States
- Resting place: Santa Maria in Monserrato degli Spagnoli
- Party: Progressive Party

Julián Villalba García (28 January 1785 – 23 November 1843) was a Spanish politician and civil servant. Born into a noble family and with a liberal ideology, Villalba held important positions during the periods of enforcement of the Constitution of Cádiz, as well as during the regency of Maria Christina of the Two Sicilies, when he served as prime minister and minister of state, both positions on an interim basis.

== Early years and education ==
Born in Zaragoza on 28 January 1785, he was the third of the six children of physician and historian Joaquín de Villalba (1752–1807) and his wife, María Simona García y Huguet (1756–1806), both of noble lineage.

At a young age he moved to the capital, where he attended the Royal Academy of Fine Arts of San Fernando. His humanistic education allowed him to work as a translator in the Royal Revenue Court in Cádiz, as he spoke English, French, Italian, Latin and Greek.

== Career ==
Thanks to his liberal ideas, he began to hold important public offices during the Peninsular War, as in June 1813 the Regency appointed him secretary of the Provincial Government of Segovia, although he was only there for a few months, since he was dismissed after the return of Ferdinand VII to Spain the following year. At the same time that this was happening, Villalba participated in the liberal press, being a correspondent for the newspaper Redactor General; for this reason, he was investigated after the return to absolutism, although it did not go any further.

After the war, he moved to England where he remained until 1820 Riego's revolt. During the Liberal Triennium, he returned to government positions, serving from 1820 as secretary of the Provincial Government of Valencia and, later, as an auxiliary officer in the Ministry of the Interior.

While authors differ regarding Villalba's whereabouts between 1823 and 1833—some say he went to France, others that he remained serving in the aforementioned Ministry—what is certain is that he did not return to the political forefront until the king's death. In September 1834, while serving as secretary of the Royal Council, he was assigned to the Directorate-General for Studies, where he became director of the Public Instruction Section and secretary to the Queen, with the power to issue decrees. Later, he was entrusted, along with other liberals, with the task of drafting the law on freedom of the press and, in June 1835, he was summoned to the Ministry of State as under-secretary.

As under-secretary of state, on 14 September 1835 he was appointed president of the Council of Ministers (prime minister) and minister of state on an interim basis until the arrival to the country of the holder, Miguel Ricardo de Álava, then ambassador of Spain to the Court of St James's; however, on the 17th he was replaced in those positions by Juan Álvarez Mendizábal. He served as under-secretary until August 1836 and, for a second time, between January 1838 and February 1839. He was also admitted into the Order of Charles III, being awarded a pensioned cross. Also, as second-highest official of the Secretariat of State, he was grefier and king of arms of the Order of the Golden Fleece.

Following this, and while continuing his work in the Ministry of State, he ran in the 1837 general election, for the Cádiz district, being elected as substitute deputy and obtaining the seat thanks to Ramón María Narváez not accepting his (Narváez preferred the seat in Seville, to which he was also elected); he served as such between February 1838 and June 1839. In that election, Villalba obtained 1673 votes compared to Narváez's 1894.

In his last years, he served as chargé d'affaires to the Holy See between 1840 and 1843, where he had to manage the difficult relations between the Holy See and the regency of Espartero. Furthermore, from this privileged position, he acted as a patron and protector of several Spanish artists in Rome, such us José and Federico de Madrazo, José Alcaide or Ponciano Ponzano, among others. Specifically, the latter was responsible for Villalba's funerary monument in the church of Santa Maria in Monserrato degli Spagnoli.

He died in Rome on 23 November 1843, at the age of 58.

== Bibliography ==
- Sampedro Escolar, José Luis (2021). "Un retrato inédito de Julián de Villalba García" [An unpublished portrait of Julián de Villalba García] (PDF). Royal Academy of Heraldry and Genealogy of Madrid (in Spanish) (24): 245–270.
