= Juan Manuel Sánchez, Duke of Almodóvar del Río =

Spanish noble and politician

The Duke of Almodóvar del Río

Don Juan Manuel Sánchez y Gutiérrez de Castro, jure uxoris Duke of Almodóvar del Río, Grandee of Spain (15 December 1850 in Jerez de la Frontera, Spain – 23 June 1906 in Madrid, Spain) was a Spanish noble and politician who served three times as Minister of State.

Almodovar was the head of a mission from Spain attending the 25th jubilee of Pope Leo XIII in February 1903. Along with Juan Pérez-Caballero y Ferrer, he was the representative of Spain in the Algeciras Conference of 1906.

In Córdoba, the 10 February 1872, he married Genoveva de Hoces, 8th Duchess of Almodóvar del Río, thus becoming a Grandee of Spain and Duke of Almodovar.

Political offices
Preceded by José Gutiérrez de Agüera; Acting	Minister of State; 24 May 1898 – 4 March 1899	Succeeded by Francisco Silvela
Preceded by The Marquis of Aguilar de Campoo	Minister of State; 6 March 1901 – 6 December 1902	Succeeded by Buenaventura de Abarzuza
Preceded by Pío Gullón	Minister of State; 1 December 1905 – 23 June 1906	Succeeded by Emilio de Ojeda; Acting
