= Pedro Francisco de Luján y Góngora, 1st Duke of Almodóvar del Río =

Spanish nobleman, ambassador and writer

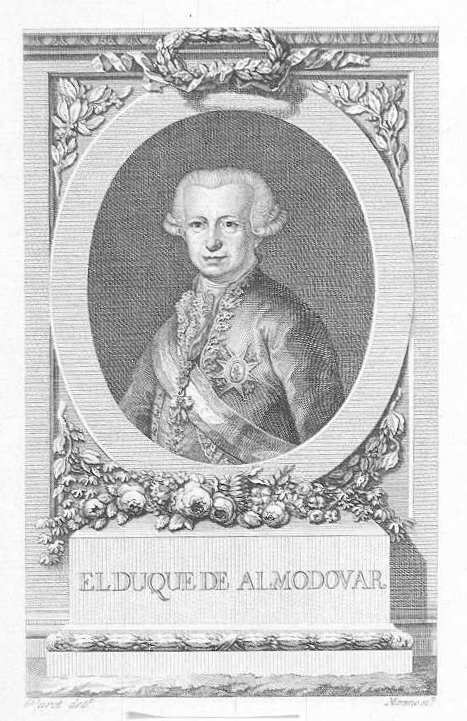
Drawing of the 1st Duke of Almodóvar del Río

Pedro Francisco Jiménez de Góngora y Luján, 1st Duke of Almodóvar del Río (1727–1794) was a Spanish nobleman, ambassador and writer.

== Career ==
Jiménez de Góngora was born to a noble family from Córdoba, Spain, and became the 7th Marqués de Almodóvar del Río. He was made a Grandee of Spain in 1779 and was named 1st Duke of Almodóvar del Río on July 11, 1780 by King Charles III of Spain. He was the fourth director of the Real Academia de la Historia from January 6, 1792 to May 14, 1794 when he died, although his death has also been quoted as 1796.

He was an Embassy Officer and Ambassador to Russia from 1759 to 1763, Ambassador to Portugal from around 1765 to 1778 and Ambassador to London in 1778. The following year he was forced to leave the position because of disputes with the British over issues concerning the American War of Independence. He was elected a Foreign Honorary Member of the American Academy of Arts and Sciences in 1789.

He had been living in the Kingdom of Naples, under King Charles VII of Naples (later also king of Spain), when he was met by the Spanish traveler and intellectual Antonio Ponz around 1751.

== Writings ==
Under the pseudonym Francisco María de Silva, Jiménez de Góngora published in 1781 ten letters on the "State of contemporary literature in France" (Década Epistolar sobre el Estado de las letras de Francia) which included some comments on the works of François Marie Arouet Voltaire. This work helped to spread the ideas of Encyclopedism in Spain.

Abbé Guillaume Thomas François Raynal published four volumes entitled Histoire philosophique et politique des établissements et du commerce des Européens dans les deux Indes in Amsterdam in 1770 about the negative influence of Spanish civilization on the colonization of foreign lands. Under the name Eduardo Malo de Luque, Jiménez de Góngora undertook the Spanish version of this work, Historia política de los establecimientos ultramarinos de las naciones europeas, "with the Comments of a Catholic Spaniard." Between 1984/1790, he completed only five of the twelve volumes, because the Count of Floridablanca forbade further publication.

The first two volumes mirror Raynal's design but he added a voluminous appendix entitled The English Constitution and the Affairs of the English East India Company, a feature not found in Raynal's original work. In Ximénez de Góngora, the third volume, he appended a 68-page essay entitled The Political and Economic State of France.

Moreover, although the Duke's fourth and Raynal's third volumes examine Scandinavian, Prussian, and Russian colonial ventures the Spaniard thought fit to add a supplement named Analytical Memoirs Relative to the History and Present State of Russia, drawn primarily from materials and recollections of his diplomatic service in St. Petersburg.
