= Count of Villacieros =

Countship of Villacieros
- Creation date: 9 February 1980
- Created by: Juan Carlos I
- Peerage: Peerage of Spain
- First holder: Antonio Villacieros y Benito, 1st Count of Villacieros
- Present holder: Álvaro Villacieros y Zunzunegui, 3rd Count of Villacieros

Count of Villacieros (Spanish: Conde de Villacieros) is a hereditary title in the Peerage of Spain, granted in 1980 by Juan Carlos I to Antonio Villacieros, Spanish ambassador, introducer of ambassadors and chief of protocol of the Royal Household of Spain.

== Counts of Villacieros (1980) ==
- Antonio Villacieros y Benito, 1st Count of Villacieros (1900-1983)
- Francisco Javier Villacieros y Machimbarrena, 2nd Count of Villacieros (1928-2016), eldest son of the 1st Count
- Álvaro Villacieros y Zunzunegui, 3rd Count of Villacieros (b. 1955), only son of the 2nd Count

== See also ==
- Spanish transition to democracy
- Spanish nobility

== Bibliography ==
- Hidalgos de España, Real Asociación de (2018). Elenco de Grandezas y Títulos Nobiliarios Españoles. Ediciones Hidalguía. ISBN 978-84-94841-02-6.
