= José Gutiérrez de Agüera =

Spanish politician

José Gutiérrez de Agüera was a Spanish politician who acted as Minister of State in 1898, in a government headed by Práxedes Mateo Sagasta. He was born in Sanlúcar de Barrameda, and was elected deputy for the province of Cádiz in the elections of 1879 and 1881 as a member of the Conservative Party.

Political offices
Preceded by Pío Gullón	Minister of State; Acting; 18 May 1898 – 24 May 1898	Succeeded by The Duke of Almodóvar del Río
