= José Ruiz de Arana y Saavedra, Duke of Baena =

Spanish aristocrat and politician

José Ruiz de Arana y Saavedra
- Born: 28 August 1826; Madrid
- Died: 23 June 1891 (aged 64); Sevilla la Nueva
- Position held: Senator of the Kingdom (1881–1891), Member of the Congress of Deputies (1864–1865)

José Ruiz de Arana y Saavedra (1826 – 1891), often referred to as the Duke of Baena after his marriage to María Rosalía Luisa Osorio de Moscoso y Carvajal, Duchess of Baena, was a Spanish aristocrat, military officer and politician. He held the noble title of "Count of Sevilla la Nueva".

== Biography ==
Born in Madrid on 28 August 1826. One of the many lovers of Queen Isabella II from 1850 to 1856, he is the presumed biological father of Infanta Isabella (born 1851), known as La Chata – a reference to her snub or "button" nose. He married María Rosalía Luisa Osorio de Moscoso y Carvajal, Duchess of Baena and daughter of Vicente Osorio de Moscoso, 13th Count of Altamira, on 26 February 1859.

During the reign of Isabella II, he served as Senator for life as well as deputy. He has been widely assumed to be the queen's lover aside from being her acknowledged favorite.

He returned to the Senate as senator for life after the Bourbon Restoration, as part of the dynastic Liberal Party. He also was Gentilhombre de cámara, and served as Ambassador before the Holy See during a Sagasta government.

He reached the military rank of Colonel.

He died at his property in Sevilla la Nueva on 23 June 1891.
