= Order of Isabella the Catholic =

Spanish civil order

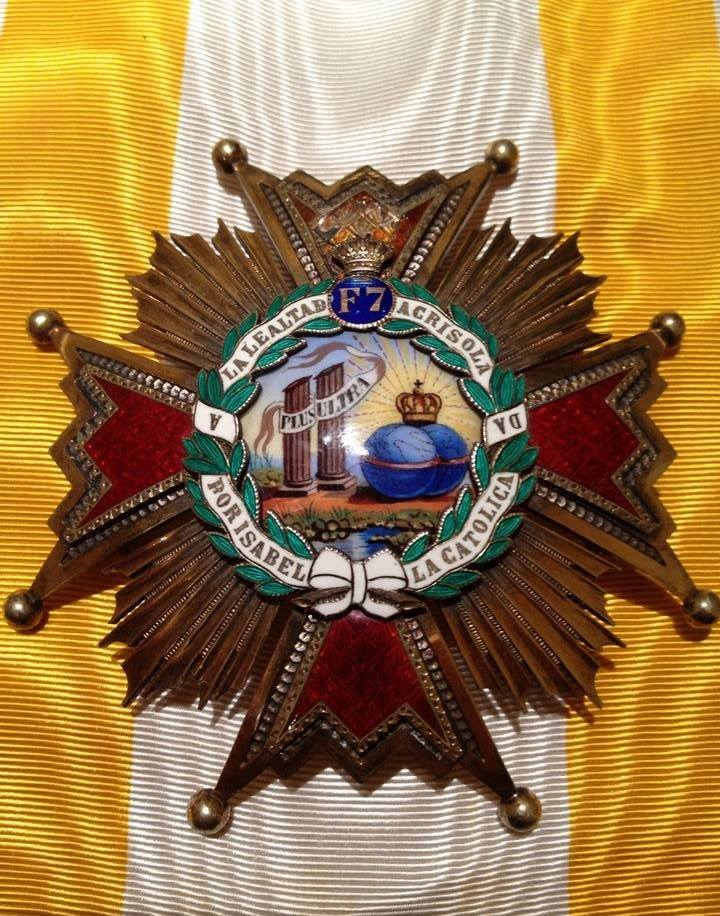
- Breast star of the Order

Awarded by the Monarch
- Type: Order of merit, Knighthood
- Established: 1815; 211 years ago
- Motto: A LA LEALTAD ACRISOLADA (To Proven Loyalty) and POR ISABEL LA CATÓLICA (For Isabella the Catholic)
- Awarded for: Actions in benefit to Spain and the Crown
- Status: Currently constituted
- Grand Master: King Felipe VI
- Grand Chancellor: José Manuel Albares, Minister of Foreign Affairs
- Chancellor: Under-Secretary of Foreign Affairs
- Grades: Knight/Dame of the Collar (CoYC); Knight/Dame Grand Cross (GYC); Commander by Number (CnYC); Commander (CYC); Officer (OYC); Knight/Dame (+YC); Silver Cross; Silver Medal; Bronze Medal

Precedence
- Next (higher): De facto, there is no higher civil order. De jure, the Order of Charles III is the higher civil honour; however, it is almost exclusively granted to government ministers.
- Next (lower): Civil Order of Alfonso X, the Wise
- Equivalent: Order of Civil Merit (for civic virtues)
- The Ribbons of the Order

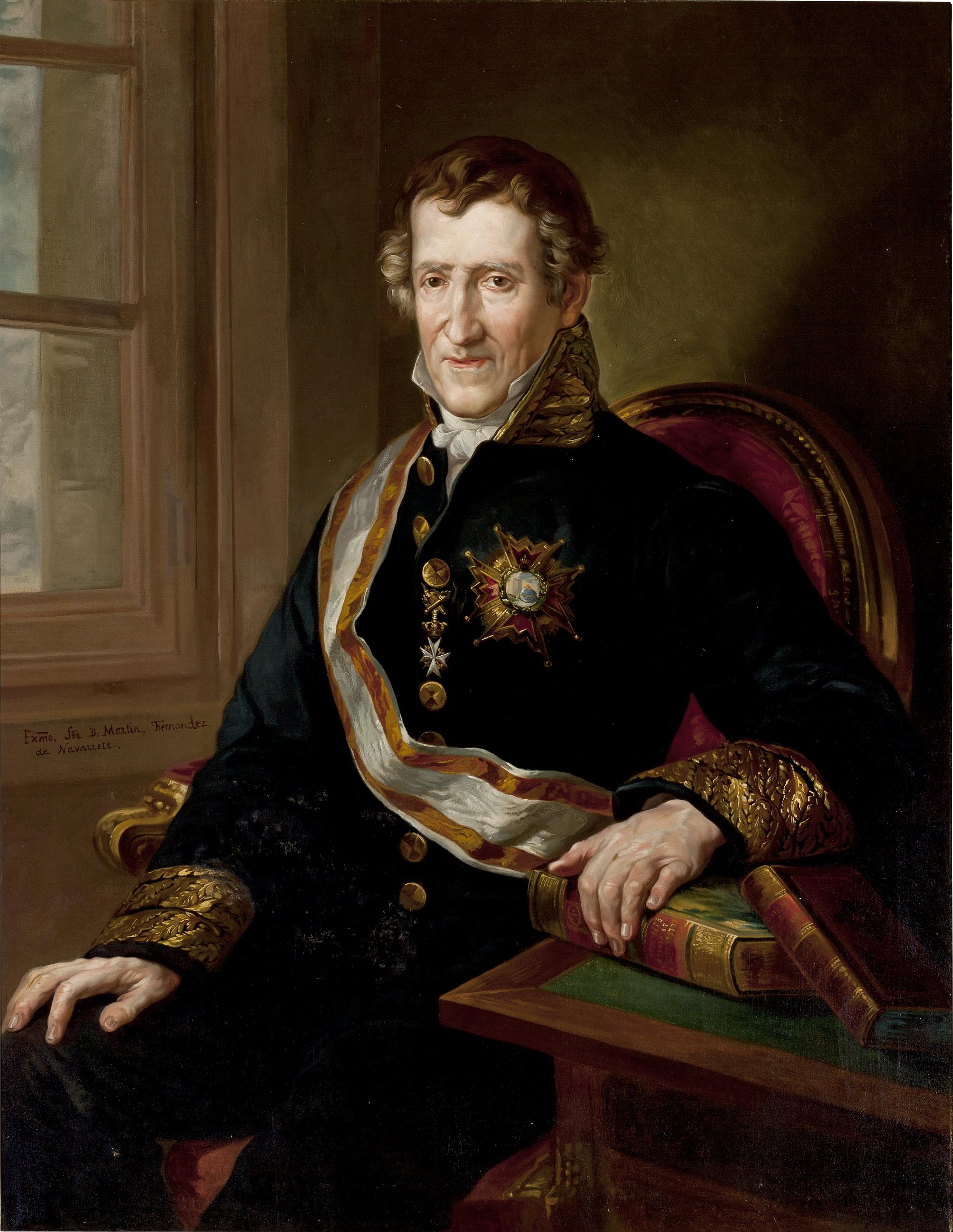
Martín Fernández de Navarrete, librarian of the Royal Spanish Academy, wearing the sash and grand cross of the order.

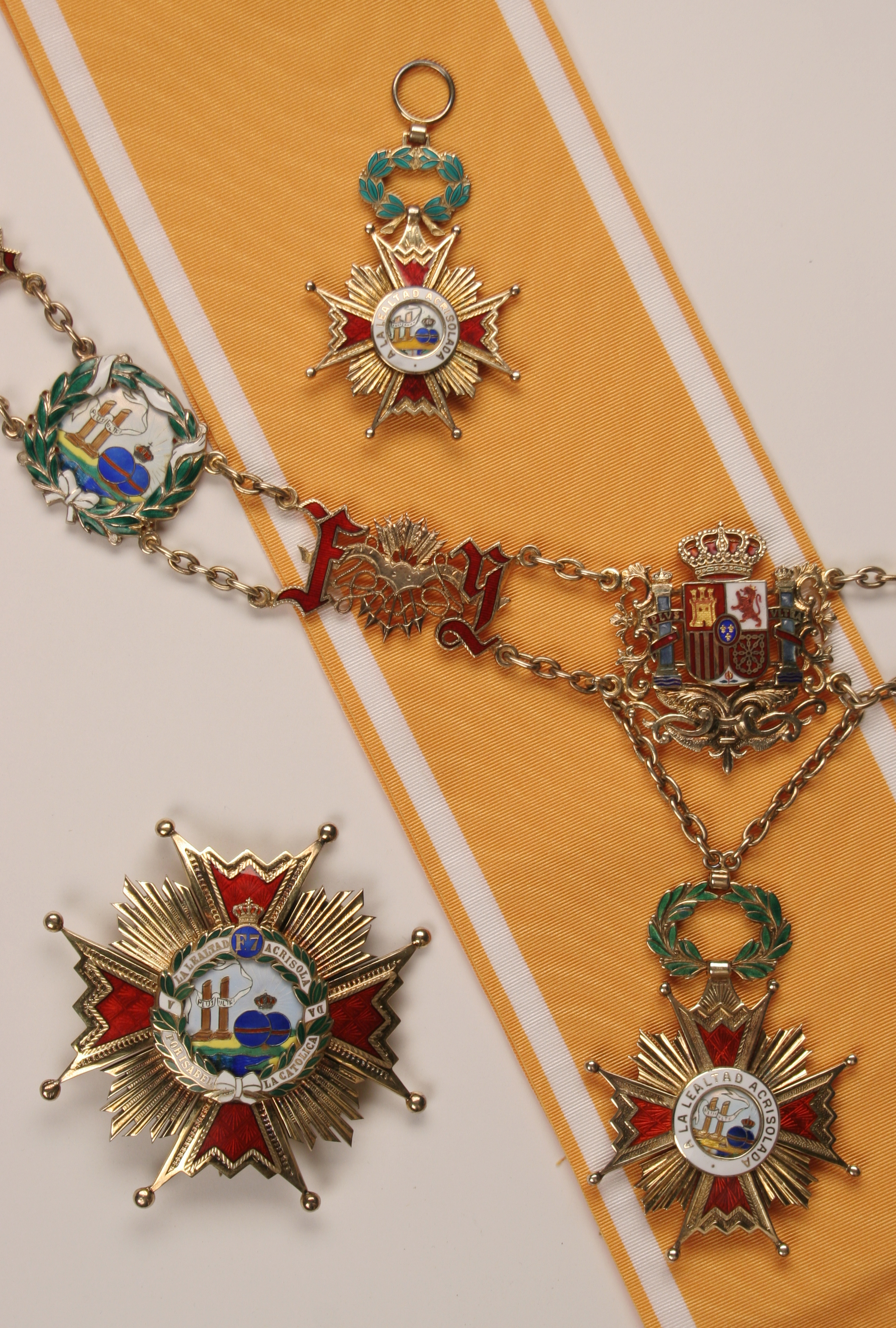
Collar granted to Czech President Václav Havel.

The Royal Order of Isabella the Catholic (Spanish: Real Orden de Isabel la Católica; Abbr.: OYC) is a knighthood and one of the three preeminent orders of merit bestowed by the Kingdom of Spain, alongside the Order of Charles III (established in 1771) and the Order of Civil Merit (established in 1926). It recognizes extraordinary services to the homeland or the promotion of international relations and cooperation with other nations, with a particular focus on the territories of the former Spanish Empire. By law, its Grand Master is the King of Spain, and its Grand Chancellor is the Minister of Foreign Affairs. The Order is open to both Spaniards and foreigners, particularly from the Spanish-speaking world.

The Order was created in 1815 by King Ferdinand VII in honor of Queen Isabella I as the Real y Americana Orden de Isabel la Católica ("Royal and American Order of Isabella the Catholic") with the intent of "rewarding the firm allegiance to Spain and the merits of Spanish citizens and foreigners in good standing with the Nation and especially in those exceptional services provided in pursuit of territories in America and overseas." The Order was reorganized by royal decree on 26 July 1847, with the name "Royal Order of Isabella the Catholic", reflecting the secession of the mainland possessions in the Americas after the Spanish American wars of independence.

The prestige that the Order of Isabella the Catholic has in Spain and abroad is due to several reasons. First, it has become a powerful instrument of international relations, with awardees inducted from all over the world. Second, it is a highly selective honour – since its creation in 1815, only 72,398 people have received the Order of Isabella the Catholic (in comparison, the also prestigious French Legion of Honour has been awarded to over 1,000,000 people over the same period of time, and the Order of the British Empire has over 100,000 living members). Third, it is the only Spanish civil honour that confers personal nobility, with the right to an individual coat of arms (with heraldic mantle and pavilion), an official style of address (The Most Illustrious Sir / Ilustrísimo Señor), and full membership in nobiliary corporations (e.g., the Real Asociación de Hidalgos).

== History ==
The Order of Isabel the Catholic was instituted by King Ferdinand VII on 14 March 1815. The original statutes of the Order were approved by Royal Decree of 24 March, with membership made in three classes: Grand Cross, and Knights of First and Second Class. Ferdinand VII was declared the Order's Founder, Head, and Sovereign. On 7 October 1816, at the suggestion of the Chapter of the Order, the Knights of the first class were renamed Commanders and the second class were renamed Knights.

By royal decree of 26 July 1847, Isabella II reorganised the four royal orders in Spain: the Order of the Golden Fleece, the Langues of Aragon and Castile of the Order of Saint John of Jerusalem, the Order of Charles III, and the Order of Isabella the Catholic. The latter was reserved to reward exclusively the services rendered in the Overseas territories. The classes of the order became Knight, Commander, Commander by Number, and Grand Cross. The concession and tests of nobility was suppressed in all the Royal Orders. By royal decree of 28 October 1851, no concessions of Grand Cross of any orders were to be made without the proposal of the Council of Ministers and concessions for the lower classes with the proposal of the Secretary of State.

After the establishment of the First Republic, the Order was declared to be extinguished by Decree of 29 March 1873 as deemed to be incompatible with the republican government. Use of the various insignias was allowed to those who possessed them. When King Alfonso XII ascended to the throne, the Order was reestablished by Decree of 7 January 1875.

Coat of arms of Alfonso XIII, with collar and heraldic mantle of the Order.

During the minority of Alfonso XIII, his mother and Regent, Maria Cristina, signed the royal decrees of 15 April 1889 and 25 October 1900. Among other things, they sought to impose entry into the Order by the category of Knight, to prohibit the use of decorations until the corresponding title was obtained, and to ratify the obligation that the Grand Cross be awarded with the agreement of the Council of Ministers and for conferees to be published in the Official Gazette. By Royal Decree of 14 March 1903, the Silver Cross of the Order was created, and by Royal Decree of 15 April 1907, the Silver and Bronze Medals.

In Royal Decree 1118, of 22 June 1927, the superior grade of Knights of the Collar was created, to be awarded to prominent personalities of extraordinary merit. It also provides that women can also be decorated with either the lazo or banda.

The Provisional Government of the Republic, by decree of 24 July 1931, abolished all orders under the Ministry of State, except for the Order of Isabella the Catholic. The regulations approved by decree of 10 October 1931 introduced a new degree: Officer (Oficial). By decree of 8 August 1935, it was established that the first degree in the Order of Isabella the Catholic was that of the Grand Cross, the Collar being reserved exclusively for very exceptional cases.

In 1938, Franco, by decree of 15 June, restored the Order in its traditional meaning: to reward meritorious services rendered to the country by nationals and foreigners. The order's regulations were approved by Decree of 29 September 1938. According to the 1938 regulations, the order consisted of the following grades: Knight of the Collar, Knight Grand Cross, Commander by Number, Commander, Knight, and Silver Cross. Decree 1353/1971, of 5 June, re-incorporated the rank of Officer, placing it between the grades of Knight and Commander. Thus, the Order consisted of the following grades: Knight of the Collar, Knight of the Grand Cross, Banda de Dama (denomination of the Grand Cross when granted to ladies), Commander by Number, Commander, Officer, Knight, Lazo de Dama (the degree of Knight when it is granted to ladies), and Cruz de Plata.

The order's current regulations date from 1998 as approved by Royal Decree 2395/1998, of 6 November. Among its provisions, the categories of Banda de Dama, Cruz de Caballero and Lazo de Dama were repealed to avoid possible interpretations of there being gender discrimination. Notwithstanding this, for aesthetic and functional reasons, the ladies who are decorated use reduced versions of the insignia of each degree of the Order.

== Officials and grades ==
The King of Spain (currently Felipe VI) is grand master. The grand chancellor is the minister of foreign affairs. All deeds granting decorations of the Order must bear the signatures of both. Members of the order at the rank of Cross and above enjoy personal nobility and have the privilege of adding a golden heraldic mantle to their coat of arms. Knights at the rank of Collar and Grand Cross receive the official style of "His or Her most Excellent Lord". Knights at the rank of Commander by Number receive the style of "His or Her Most Illustrious Lord". Knights at the rank of Commander and below receive the style of "Lord". There are currently the following grades:

- First Class

- Collar (CoYC) (Collar)
- Knight Grand Cross (GYC) (Caballeros Gran Cruz)

- Second Class

- Commander by Number (CnYC) (Encomienda de Número)
- Commander (CYC) (Encomienda)

- Third Class

- Officer's Cross (OYC) (Cruz de Oficial)

- Fourth Class

- Cross (+YC) (Cruz)

- Fifth Class

- Silver Cross (Cruz de Plata)

- Sixth Class

- Silver Medal (Medalla de Plata)
- Bronze Medal (Medalla de Bronce)

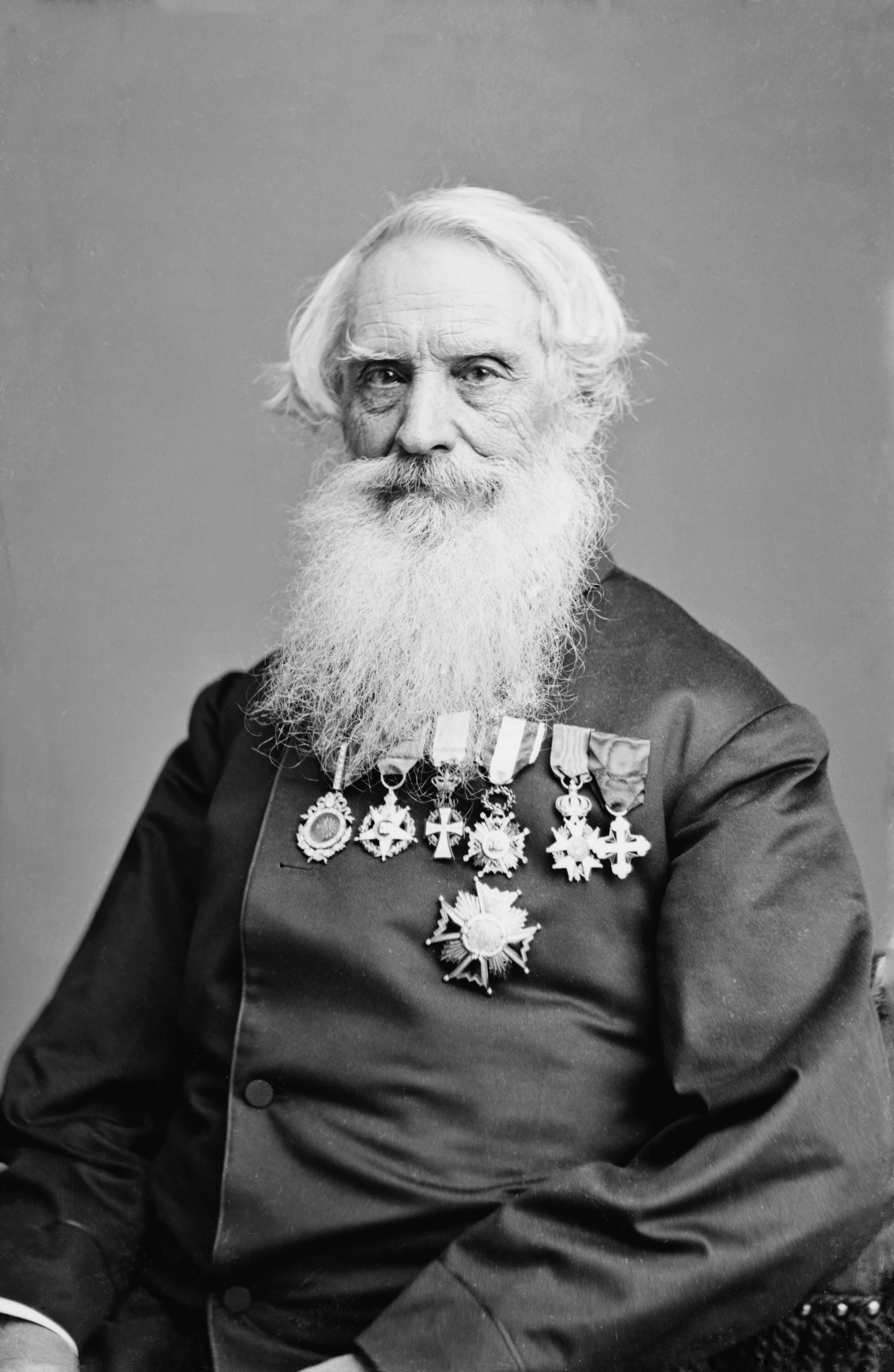
Samuel Morse wearing the knight's cross (fourth from left) and the commander cross of the order (bottom), 1866.

The original statutes of the order of 24 March 1815 established the order in three classes. The structure of the order has varied several times since then. The following is a summary of the history of the various grades and medals of the order:

- Collar (Collar) – Established 22 June 1927.
- Knights Grand Cross (Caballeros Gran Cruz) – Established 24 March 1815.
- Knights of First Class (Caballeros de Primera Clase) – Established 24 March 1815, retitled Commander (Comdador) on 24 July 1815.
- Officer (Oficial) – Established 10 October 1931, abolished 15 June 1938 and restored 5 June 1971.
- Knight of Second Class (Caballeros de Segunda Clase) – Established 24 March 1815, retitled Knight (Caballeros) on 24 July 1815.
- Silver Cross (Cruz de Plata) – Established 16 March 1903 to reward civil and palace officials.
- Gold Medal with Laureate (Medalla de Oro pero Laureada) – Established on 24 July 1815 for award to European sergeants and enlisted men. Subsequently abolished.
- Gold Medal (Medalla de Oro) – Established on 24 July 1815 for award to non-European 'natives'. Subsequently abolished.
- Silver Medal (Medalla de Plata) – Established 15 April 1907 to reward non-commissioned officers and junior civil officials.
- Bronze Medal (Medalla de Bronce) – Established 15 April 1907 to reward non-commissioned officers and junior civil officials.

Women appointed to an applicable grade are not called Knights (Caballeros). Women are instead appointed as Dames Grand Cross (Damas Gran Cruz) or Dame's Cross (Cruz de Damas).

== Order decoration ==
The decoration is a red-enameled cross, with a golden frame. The outer peaks are fitted with small gold balls. The center of the medallion contains the inscription "A La Lealtad Acrisolada" (To Proven Loyalty) and "Por Isabel la Católica" (By Isabella the Catholic) on white enamel. Above the cross is a green enameled laurel wreath with the band ring.

The ribbon is yellow with a white central stripe, except the "Collar", the wearing of which can be replaced by a gold-yellow sash with white stripes on the edges.

Insignia
Collar	Collar Grade Star	Grand Cross	Grand Cross Star	Commander by Number
Commander	Dame-Commander Bow (Optional)	Officer's Cross	Dame-Officer's Bow (Optional)	Knight's Cross
Dame Bow (Optional)	Silver Cross	Dame's Silver Cross Bow (Optional)	Silver Medal	Dame's Silver Medal Bow (Optional)
Bronze Medal	Dame's Bronze Medal Bow (Optional)			

== Recipients ==
Dedicated article: Members of the Order of Isabella the Catholic (es)
