= Inocencio Arias =

Spanish diplomat

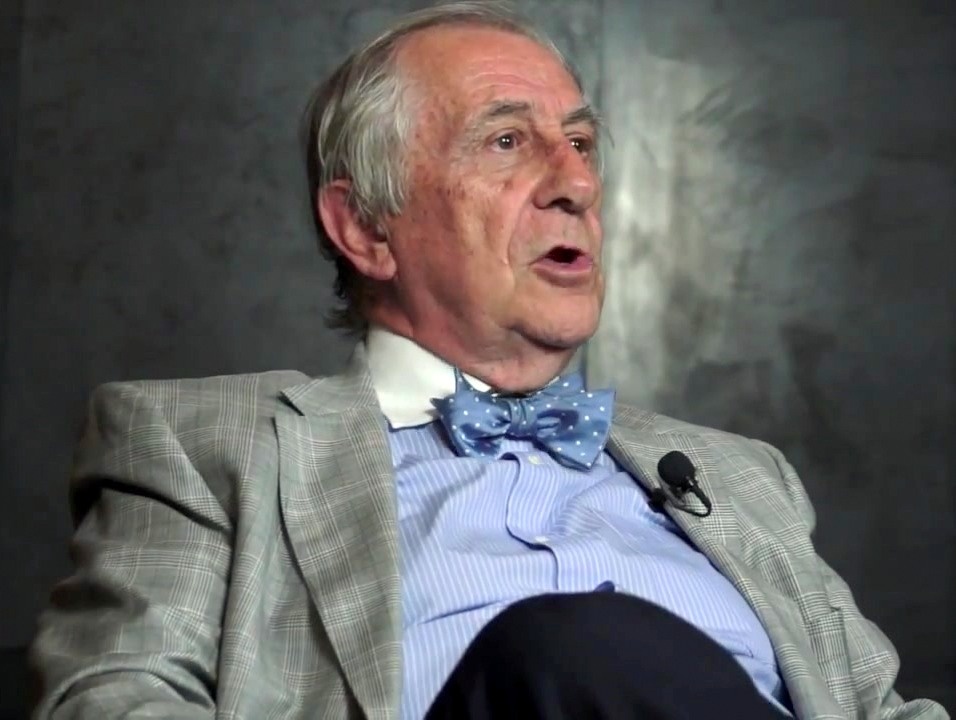
Inocencio Arias in 2014.

Inocencio F. Arias, also known as Chencho (born April 20, 1940 in Albox, Almería province), is a multifarious Spanish diplomat, who served as consul general in Los Angeles, California, United States. He retired in 2010.

== Career ==
His previous assignment was as Permanent Representative of Spain to the United Nations in New York City. In the Security Council he presided the Antiterrorism Committee of the United Nations. Previously, he served as State Secretary for International cooperation and for Ibero-American Affairs (1991–93) and as Under-Secretary of Foreign Affairs (1988–91).

In the Ministry of Foreign Affairs, Arias was Director of the Diplomatic Information Office and spokesman of the Department with quite different democratic administrations: center, 1980–82; socialist, 1985–88; and center-right, 1996-97. During his diplomatic career, he served in Bolivia, Algeria and Portugal.

He participated in several international conferences: the Earth Summit (Rio de Janeiro 1992); European Councils (1986, 87, 88, 96); NATO summit (Madrid, 1997); Middle East Summit (Madrid 1991) and Non-Aligned Movement Summit (Jakarta 1992); Iberoamerican Summits (Mexico City 1991, Madrid 1992, Bahia 1993, Santiago, Chile 1996).

He has been a member of the Spanish Delegation to the 36th, 37th, 40th-43rd, and 51st-57th sessions of the United Nations General Assembly.

== Non-diplomatic experience ==
Arias, who holds a degree in Law and joined the diplomatic service in 1967, also has a considerable experience outside the diplomatic world. He was General Director of the football Club Real Madrid (1993–95). He also has experienced the academic field, having been professor of International Relations at the Complutense University and at the University Carlos III, both in Madrid. Mr. Arias is the author of several books, papers and contributions, among others, on political issues and international relations. His latest title, "Confesiones de un diplomatico" (Publisher: Planeta), is about the events leading up to the Iraq invasion inside the U.N. Security Council, interspersed with U.S. famous historic events as well as the entertainment industry and U.S. pastimes viewed from a Spanish/European perspective. Martin Prieto in "El Mundo" writes that Arias, after examining the origins and development of the Iraq war, states that without the terrorist attack of March 2003 in Madrid the center-right Popular Party would have won the elections of that year and examines the European antiamericanism plus the American ignorance of Europe. M. Prieto concludes that the book is balanced and informative and with a lot of the sense of humour that Mr. Arias distills. Perez Maura in "ABC" said that Arias "has written an enjoyable and illuminating book with some truly hilarious pages". In addition, Mr. Arias authored a book about three famous football stars ("Los Tres Mitos del Real Madrid"): Di Stéfano, Butragueño and Raúl; and edited a multilingual international soccer dictionary during the Football World Cup hosted by Spain in 1982. In February 2010 Arias published "La Trastienda de la Diplomacia" (Ed. Plaza Janés)(The backroom of diplomacy) that describes with humor and insight some 25 international encounters. The book had a fast second printing because the first one was sold out in three weeks.

== Controversy about the Invasion of Iraq in 2003 ==
Arias made the headlines in August 2003, when he was recalled from New York with immediate effect, despite the fact that he was officially on holiday. The mainstream media seemed to agree stating "it's no secret that the Spanish government is unhappy with comments made by Arias" who said that "if weapons of mass destruction were not found in Iraq, the justification of the decision to go to war would be undermined". The government said, however, that the ambassador returned for 'professional reasons'.
