= Antonio Richarte =

Spanish painter

Antonio Richarte (1690–1764) was a Spanish painter.

He was born at Yecla. He was educated for a learned profession, but he preferred painting, which he studied under Senén Vila at Murcia, and afterwards at Madrid with Miguel Jacinto Meléndez. He was very popular at Valencia, where he was much employed in painting processional banners for the guilds of that city.
