= Juan Pérez-Caballero y Ferrer =

Spanish politician and diplomat

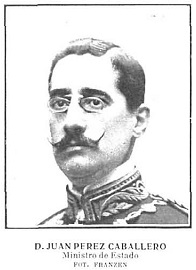
Juan Pérez-Caballero

Juan Pérez-Caballero y Ferrer (8 November 1861, in Madrid – 10 December 1951 in San Sebastián) was a Spanish politician and diplomat who served three times as Minister of State during the reign of Alfonso XIII.

Political offices
Preceded by Emilio de Ojeda; Acting	Minister of State; 1 July 1906 – 6 July 1906	Succeeded by Pío Gullón
Preceded by Pío Gullón	Minister of State; 30 November 1906 – 25 January 1907	Succeeded by Manuel Allendesalazar
Preceded by Manuel Allendesalazar	Minister of State; 21 October 1909 – 9 February 1910	Succeeded by The Marquis of Alhucemas
