= Pío Gullón =

Spanish lawyer, journalist and politician

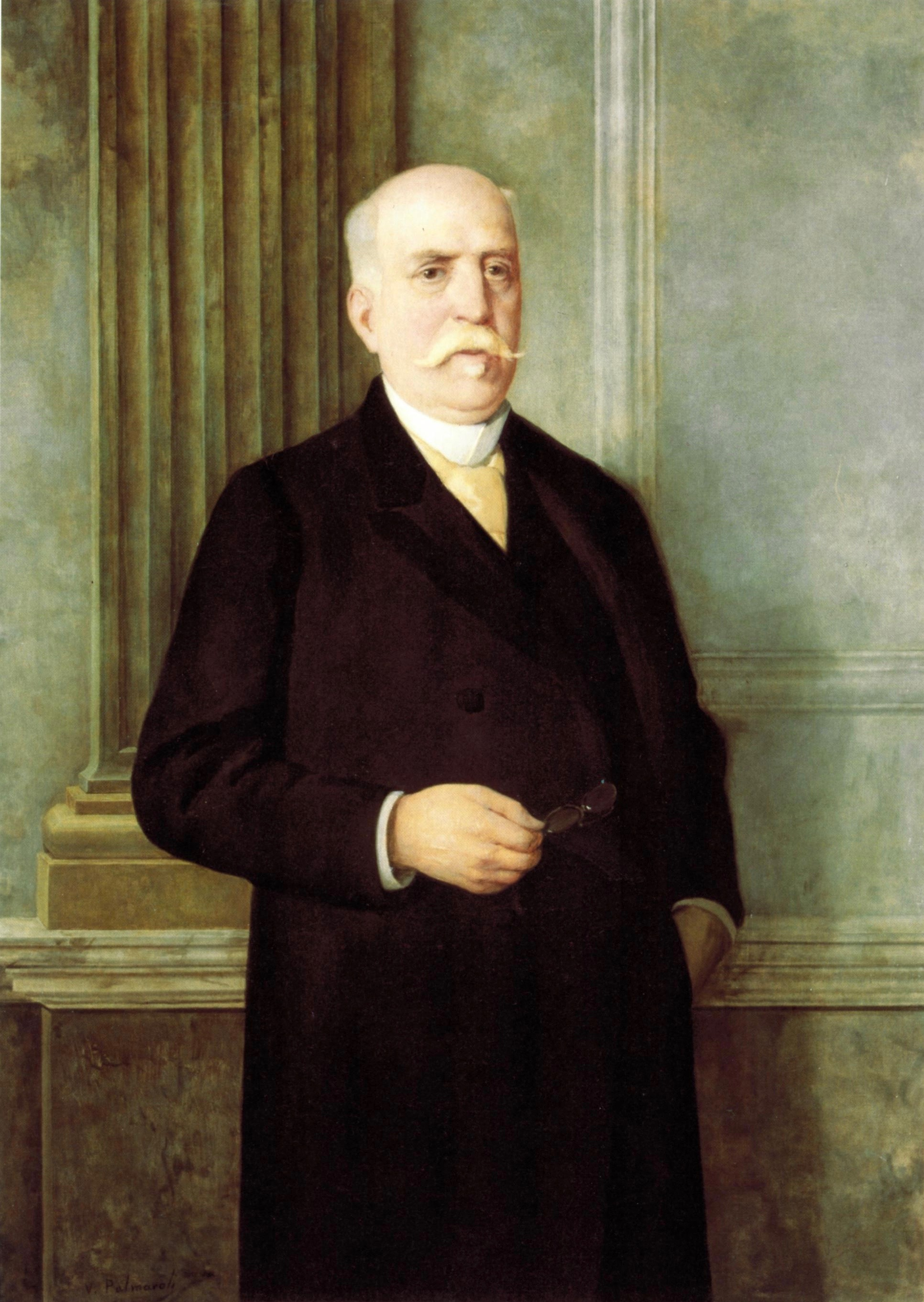
Pío Gullón e Iglesias

Pío Gullón e Iglesias (1835 in Astorga, Spain – 22 November 1917, in Madrid, Spain) was a Spanish lawyer, journalist and politician who served three times as Minister of State.

He was a member of the Congress of Deputies, representing as deputy Toledo, in 1871-72, 1881, 1884, and 1886. He also became a senator for life immediately after being a deputy from 1887 to 1916, although for four of these years he did not take a seat.

Political offices
Preceded by The Duke of Tetuan	Minister of State; 4 October 1897 – 18 May 1898	Succeeded by José Gutiérrez de Agüera; Acting
Preceded by Felipe Sánchez Román	Minister of State; 31 October 1905 – 1 December 1905	Succeeded by The Duke of Almodóvar del Río
Preceded by Juan Pérez-Caballero	Minister of State; 6 July 1906 – 30 November 1906	Succeeded by Juan Pérez-Caballero
