= Duke of Almodóvar del Río =

Dukedom of Spain

Dukedom of Almodóvar del Río
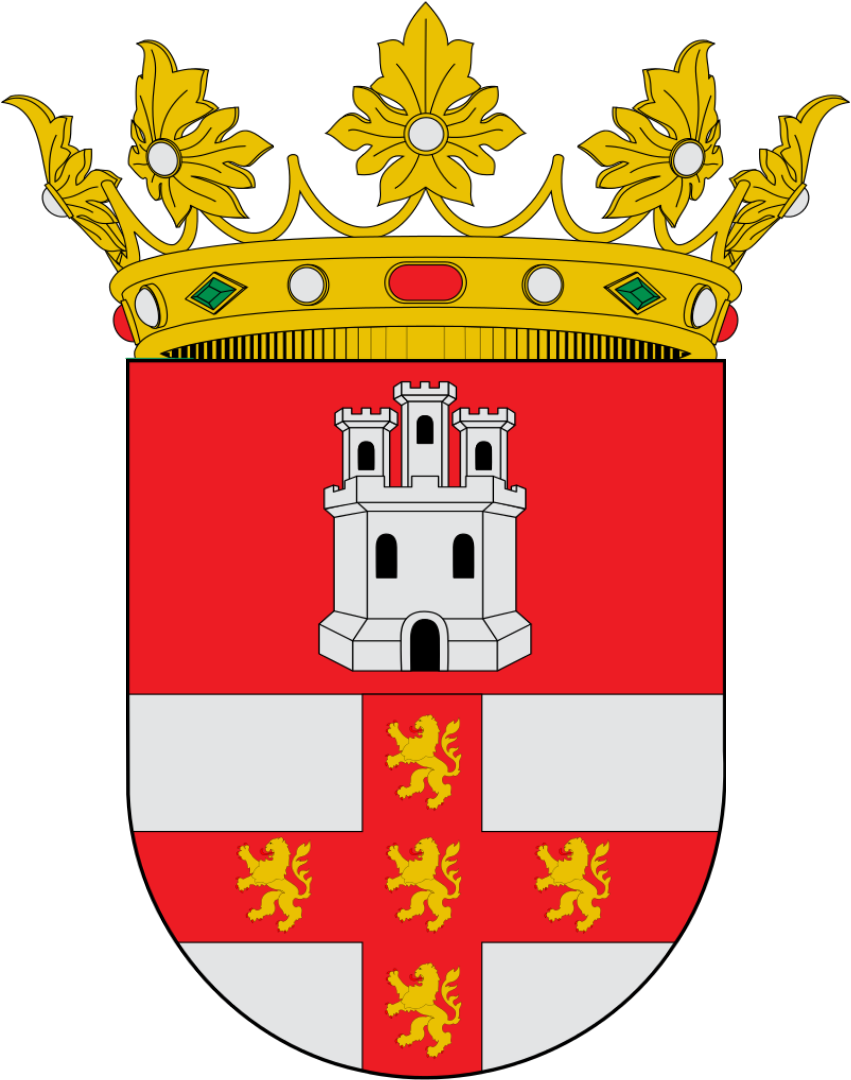
- Creation date: 11 July 1780
- Created by: Charles III
- Peerage: Peerage of Spain
- First holder: Pedro Francisco de Luján y Góngora, 1st Duke of Almodóvar del Río
- Present holder: Alfonso de Hoyos y Fernández de Córdoba

Duke of Almódovar del Río (Ducado de Almodóvar del Río) is a hereditary ducal title in the Spanish nobility which holds a Grandeeship of Spain. It was conferred on 11 July 1780 on Pedro Jiménez de Góngora, 6th Marquess of Almodóvar del Río, by King Charles III of Spain, thus raising to a dukedom the Marquessate of Almodóvar del Río. This title had been granted to Francisco Jiménez de Góngora y Castillejo by King Charles II of Spain, on 13 May 1667. Historically, the title corresponds to dominion over the area around Almodóvar del Río.

== Marquesses of Almodóvar del Río (1667-1780) ==
- Francisco Jiménez de Góngora, 1st Marquess of Almodóvar del Río
- Luis José Jiménez de Góngora, 2nd Marquess of Almodóvar del Río, only son of the 1st Marques
- Antonio Suárez de Góngora, 3rd Marquess of Almodóvar del Río, distant cousin of the 2nd Marquess. Head of the House of Góngora
- Pedro Suárez de Góngora, 4th Marquess of Almodóvar del Río, elder son of the 3rd Marquess
- Ana Suárez de Góngora, 5th Marchioness of Almodóvar del Río, eldest daughter of the 4th Marquess
- Pedro Suárez de Góngora, 6th Marquess of Almodóvar del Río, eldest son of the 3rd Marquess. Became Duke

== Dukes of Almodóvar del Río (1780) ==
- Pedro Suárez de Góngora, 1st Duke of Almodóvar del Río
- María Rafaela Suárez de Góngora, 2nd Duchess of Almodóvar del Río, elder sister of the 1st Duke
- Josefa de Carroz, 3rd Duchess of Almodóvar del Río, only daughter of the 2nd Duchess
- Francisco de Paula Fernández de Córdoba, 4th Duke of Almodóvar del Río, descendant of the 1st Marquess' only sister
- Joaquín Fernández de Córdoba, 5th Duke of Almodóvar del Río, eldest brother of the 4th Duke
- Joaquín Fernández de Córdoba, 6th Duke of Almodóvar del Río, eldest son of the 5th Duke
- Isabel Fernández de Córdoba, 7th Duchess of Almodóvar del Río, elder surviving daughter of the 6th Duke
- Genoveva de Hoces, 8th Duchess of Almodóvar del Río, only daughter of the 6th Duke's only sister. Married to Juan Manuel Sánchez y Gutiérrez de Castro
- José Ramón Sánchez, 9th Duke of Almodóvar del Río, eldest son of the 8th Duchess
- José Manuel Sánchez, 10th Duke of Almodóvar del Río, only son of the 9th Duke
- Alfonso de Hoyos, 11th Duke of Almodóvar del Río, elder son of the 8th Duke's only sister
- Isidoro de Hoyos, 12th Duke of Almodóvar del Río, elder son of the 11th Duke
- Alfonso de Hoyos y Fernández de Córdoba, 13th Duke of Almodóvar del Río, elder son of the 12th Duke

== See also ==
- List of dukes in the peerage of Spain
- List of current grandees of Spain
