= Sevilla la Nueva =

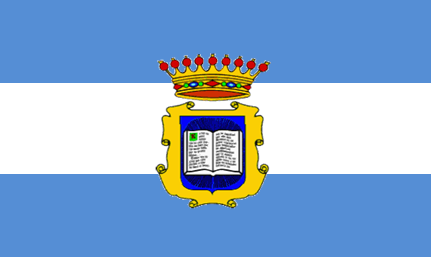
- Flag
- Interactive map of Sevilla la Nueva
- Location in Spain.
- Coordinates: 40°20′51″N 4°01′43″W
- Country: Spain
- Autonomous community: Madrid

Area
  - Total: 25.1 km^{2} (9.7 sq mi)
- Elevation: 676 m (2,218 ft)

Population (2025-01-01)
  - Total: 9,802
  - Density: 391/km^{2} (1,010/sq mi)
- Time zone: UTC+1 (CET)
  - Summer (DST): UTC+2 (CEST)
- Website: www.sevillalanueva.es

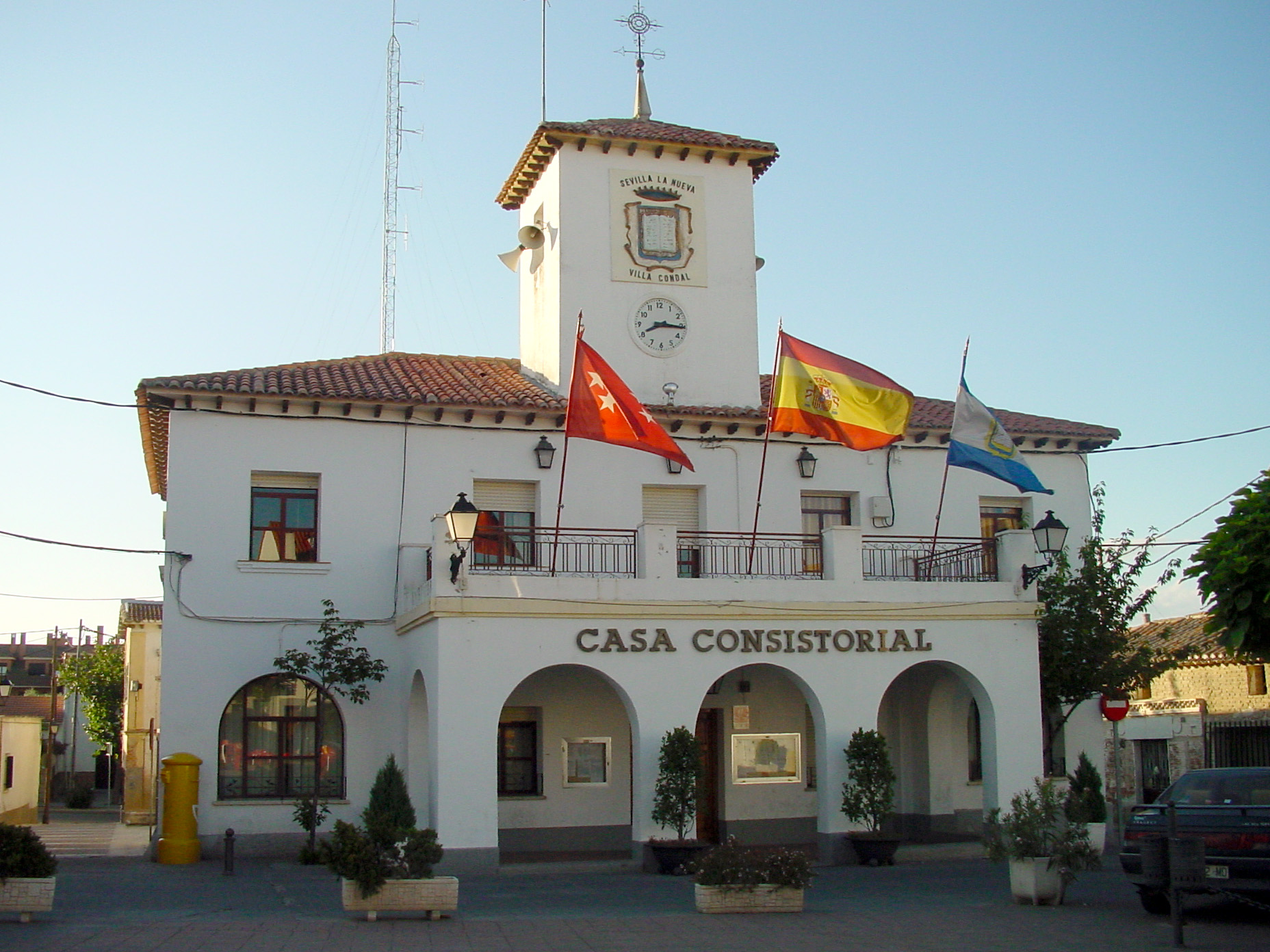
Town Hall of Sevilla la Nueva

Sevilla la Nueva is a town located in the south west of the Community of Madrid, Spain. It had a population of 9,361 in 2022.
