= Minister of Foreign Affairs (Spain) =

Head of the Spanish Ministry of Foreign Affairs

- Coat of arms of Spain

- Standard used by government officials

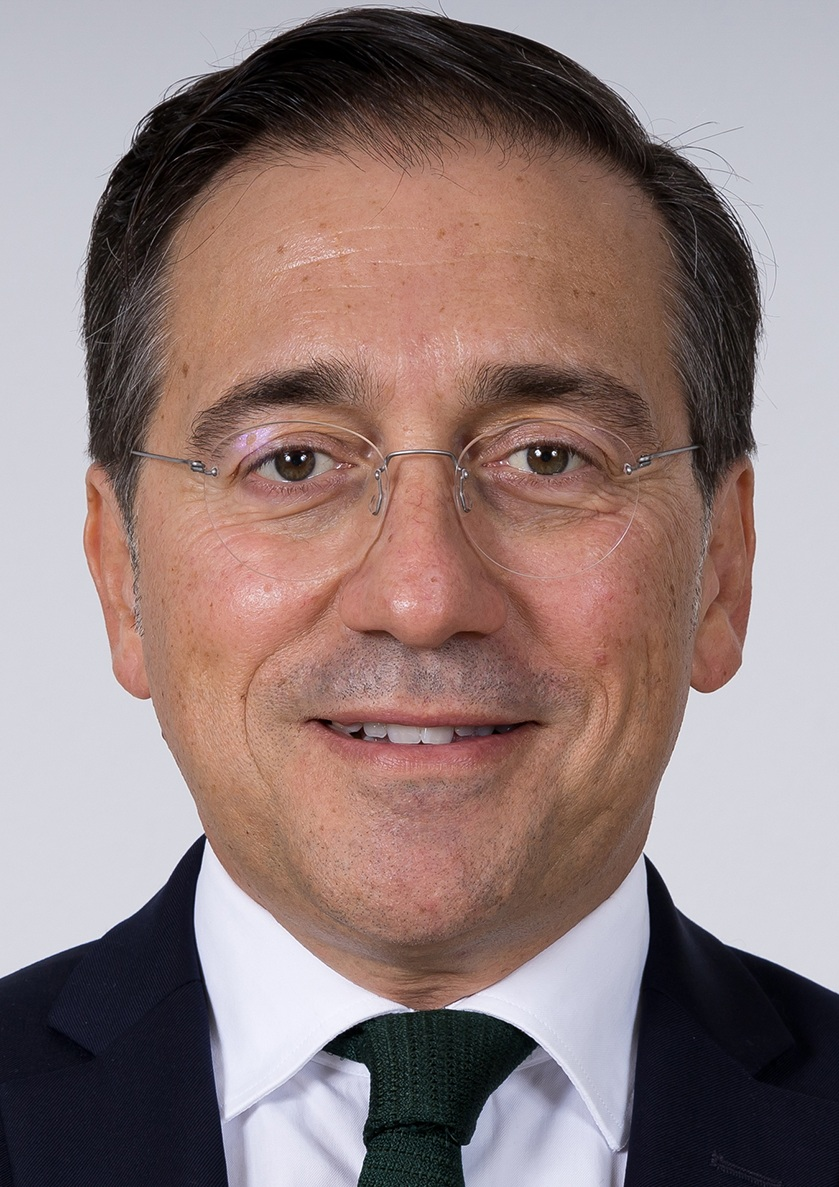
- Incumbent; José Manuel Albares since 12 July 2021
- Ministry of Foreign Affairs
- Style: The Most Excellent (formal); Mr. Minister (informal)
- Member of: Council of Ministers; National Security Council; Foreign Policy Council
- Residence: Palace of Viana
- Nominator: The Prime Minister
- Appointer: The Monarch countersigned by the prime minister
- Term length: No fixed term
- Precursor: Secretary of the Universal Office
- Formation: July 11, 1705; 321 years ago
- First holder: Pedro Fernández del Campo, Marquess of Mejorada del Campo
- Website: exteriores.gob.es/ministro

The minister of foreign affairs, called in the past secretary or minister of state, is a member of the Council of Ministers and the head of the Ministry of Foreign Affairs, European Union and Cooperation. The foreign minister is responsible for designing and implementing Spain's foreign and development cooperation policies, as well as coordinating the country's foreign action and service.

The minister is, after the Monarch and the Prime Minister, Spain's highest international representative, possessing full powers to represent the country, negotiate, adopt, and authenticate treaties, as well as to express Spain's consent to be bound by them. In this regard, he is responsible for appointing Spain's representatives for the execution of any international act relating to an international treaty.

The minister of foreign affairs is appointed by the monarch, on the advice of the prime minister, and is one of the most relevant ministerial offices of Spain, ranking in protocol ahead of the other ministers and just behind the prime minister (or the deputy prime ministers if there were any).

== History ==
The position was established in 1705, when the office of Secretary of the Universal Dispatch was divided in two: one for War and Finance and other for everything else, known as Secretary of State (focused on foreign affairs and internal government). Later, in 1714, it was again divided to established an independent department for justice and religious affairs.

In practice, this official acted as a prime minister and was therefore also known as the "First Secretary of State". As an example, new Crown ministers were sworn in before this minister.

This position was appointed at the king's discretion, and such was its influence over the monarch and the administration that, by the beginning of the 19th century, its department not only covered international relations, but also all kinds of internal government matters, both related to the royal family and to the post office, roads and trails, charity, health care, education, arts and sciences, among others.

At the beginning of the 19th century, it gradually lost responsibilities to other ministerial portfolios, such as the Ministry of the Interior, although it retained its prominence during the first half of that period thanks to the fact that the Presidency of the Council of Ministers was linked to the Ministry of State.

=== Relation with the prime minister ===
All foreign ministers from 1705 to 1836 led the Spanish government. The Count of Almodóvar, minister of state from April to May 1836, was the first person to serve as such without being the head of government, under Juan Álvarez Mendizábal.

Although in later years we can still find ministers of state who, at the same time, were prime ministers, this practice was abandoned starting in the second half of the 19th century. As an example of the exceptionality that this currently represents, the last four prime ministers who were secretaries of state were: The Count of Romanones (December 1918-April 1919), The Marquess of Estella (February 1927-January 1930), The Count of Xauen (January–February 1930) and Augusto Barcia Trelles (for three days in 1936). The last person to be prime minister after serving as minister of foreign affairs was Alejandro Lerroux, who served as minister of state from April to December 1931 and was appointed prime minister in September 1933.

== Residence ==
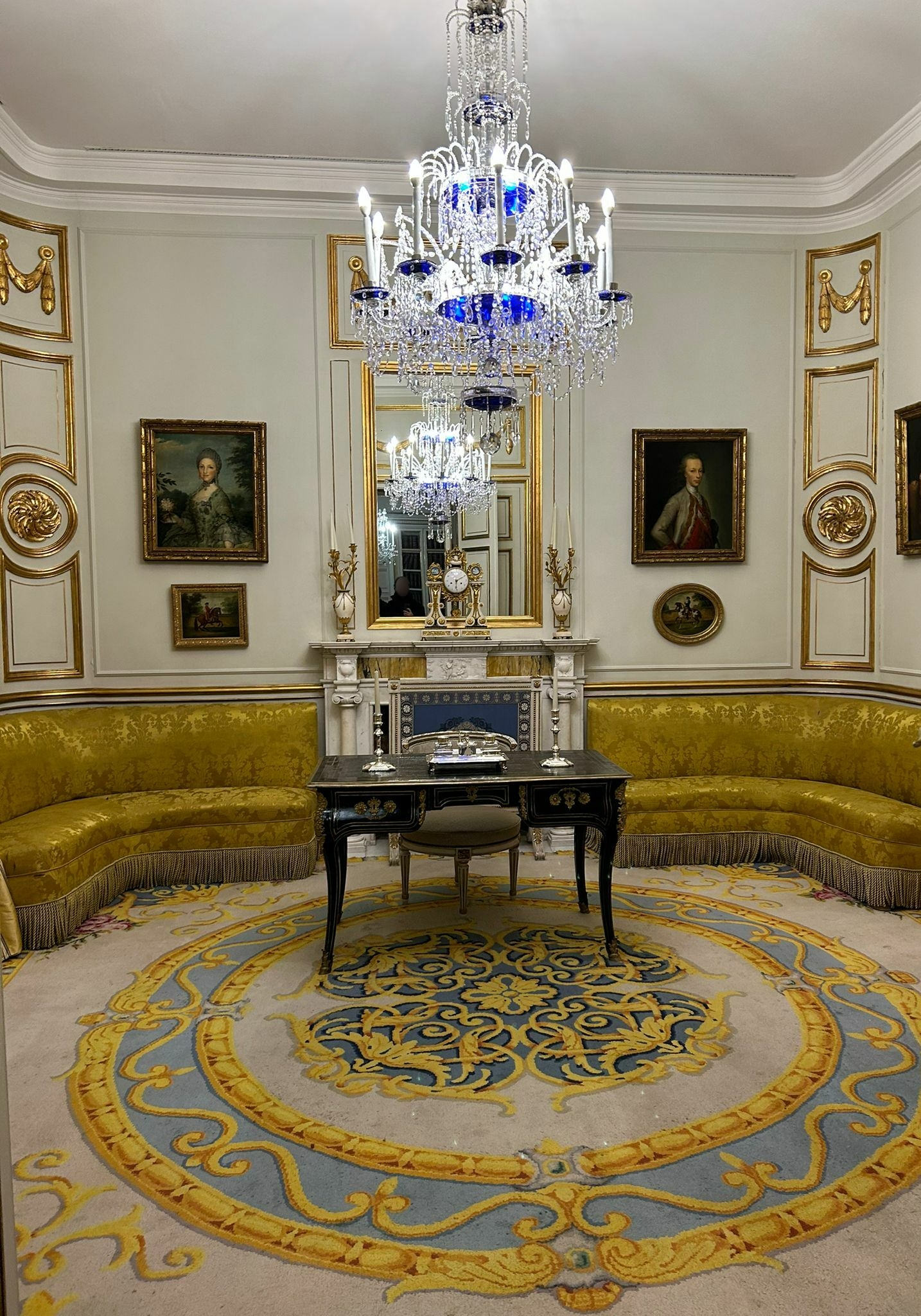
One of the rooms of the palace

The official residence of the foreign minister is the Palace of Viana, located at the no. 1 Duke of Rivas street, in Madrid. The palace was commissioned by Beatriz Galindo, lady-in-waiting to Queen Isabella the Catholic. After passing through several owners over the following centuries, it eventually came into the possession of Ángel de Saavedra, 3rd Duke of Rivas, who significantly renovated it in the 1840s. It underwent further renovations in 1920 and, in 1939, the Spanish government leased the palace to Fausto de Saavedra y Collado, 3rd Marquess of Viana, to use it as the residence of the Minister of Foreign Affairs. Finally, in 1955 the palace was acquired by the government.

== Foreign Policy Council ==
The Foreign Policy Council (Spanish: Consejo de Política Exterior, CPE) is an advisory body of the Spanish government created by José María Aznar in 2000 to support the prime minister in making foreign policy decisions. This body consolidates the primacy of the prime minister over the foreign minister in foreign policy issues, a situation that began during the premiership of Leopoldo Calvo-Sotelo, who personally oversaw Spain's entry into NATO, and which intensified under Felipe González, who created an International Department within the Prime Minister's Office that still exists today.

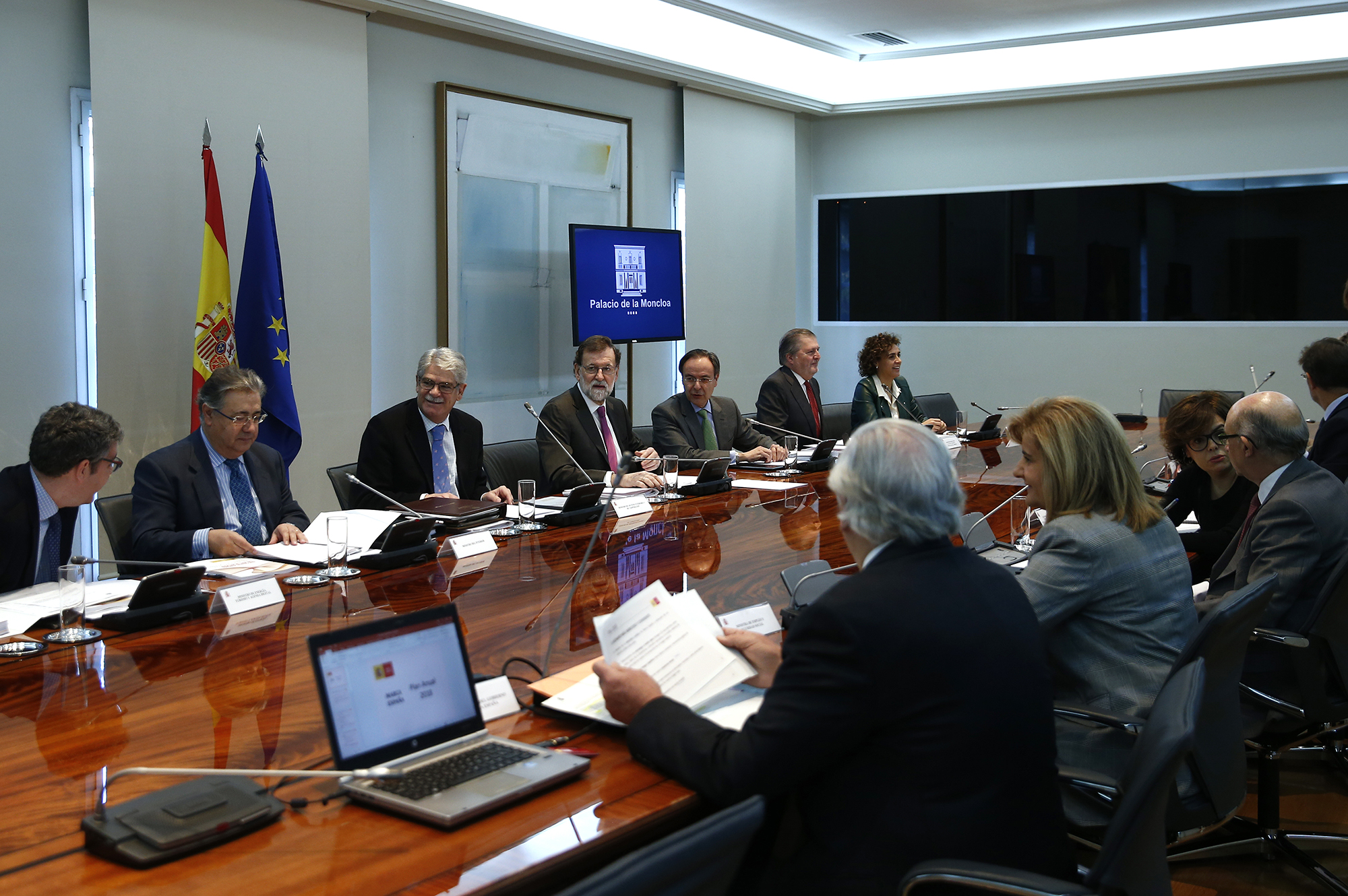
Prime minister Mariano Rajoy chairing a CPE meeting in 2018

The CPE is integrated by the prime minister, who chairs it, the deputy prime ministers (if any) and the Government ministers, as well as the Moncloa Chief of Staff. The secretary of the CPE is the Director of the Foreign Affairs Department of the Office of the Prime Minister.

Within the CPE, there is the Foreign Policy Executive Council, chaired by the minister of foreign affairs. This Executive Council is responsible for implementing the foreign policy guidelines established by the CPE and it includes representatives from the aforementioned departments, with a minimum rank of under-secretary. The Secretary of State for Budget and Expenditure, the Secretary of State for Territorial Policy, the Secretary of State for Press, and the Secretary of State for Foreign Affairs are also ex officio members of it.

== Orders ==
The Ministry of Foreign Affairs oversees two of Spain's main civil orders: the Order of Isabella the Catholic and the Order of Civil Merit. The minister, as head of the department, is the Grand Chancellor of both decorations, while the under-secretary is the Chancellor.

=== Order of Isabella the Catholic ===
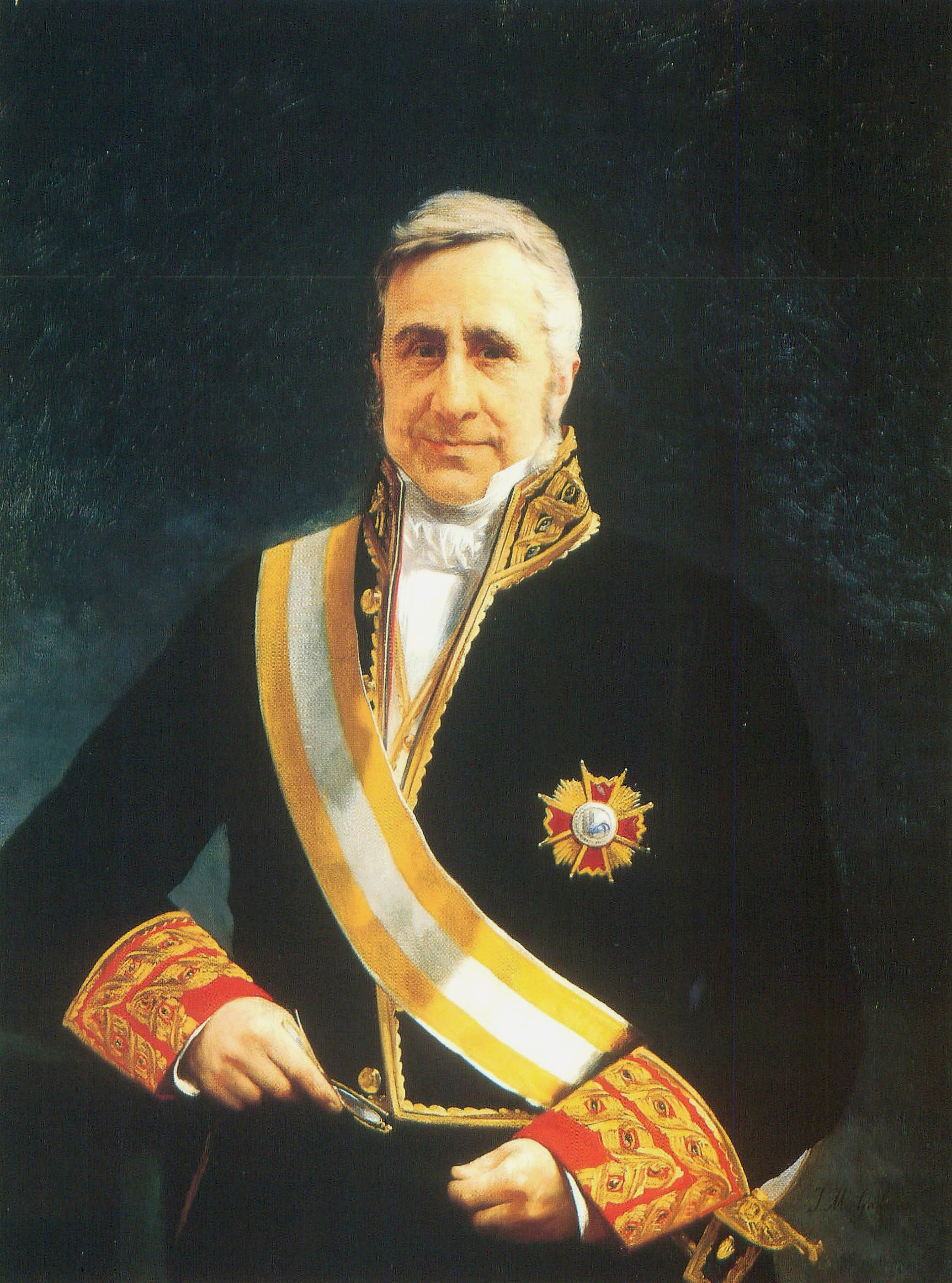
Mauricio Carlos de Onís y Mercklein, minister of state in 1840, wearing the sash and the grand cross of the Order of Isabella the Catholic

The Order of Isabella the Catholic, established in 1815 by King Ferdinand VII, it is, after the Order of Charles III, the most prestigious civil order of Spain. It is focused on "rewarding extraordinary acts of a civil nature, carried out by Spanish and foreign persons, that benefit the Nation or that contribute significantly to fostering friendly relations and cooperation between the Spanish Nation and the rest of the international community". Therefore, it is the main order dedicated to diplomacy, with the main beneficiaries being members of the diplomatic service and foreign leaders.

Exceptionally, the Collar of the Order it is the distinction that prime ministers receive after leaving office, since they cannot receive the Order of Charles III, of which they are a part from the moment they assume office.

=== Order of Civil Merit ===
Created in 1926 by King Alfonso XIII, the Order of Civil Merit is focused on rewarding "the civil merits acquired by personnel employed by any of the public administrations, or by individuals outside the administration, who provide or have provided relevant services to the State, through extraordinary work, beneficial initiatives, or exemplary constancy in the fulfillment of their duties". It may also be awarded "to persons of foreign nationality, provided they have rendered distinguished services to Spain or notable collaboration in all matters that benefit the Nation".

== Parliamentary control ==
According to the Constitution, the Minister of Foreign Affairs, as a member of the Government, is subject to parliamentary oversight and must attend parliamentary questioning sessions and committees where their presence is required. Furthermore, in accordance with Article 35(5) of Law 2/2014, of March 25, on the State's Foreign Action and Service (LASEE), the minister is required to appear annually before the Cortes Generales to assess the implementation of the Foreign Action Strategy. Likewise, Article 44(4) of said law obliges the minister to notify the Congress of Deputies Foreign Affairs Committee of any ambassadorial appointment.

== Timeline since 1975 ==
The following timeline depicts the progression of foreign ministers and their political affiliation at the time of assuming office since the reign of Juan Carlos I.

== Bibliography ==
- Badorrey Martín, Beatriz (1999). Los orígenes del Ministerio de Asuntos Exteriores, 1714-1808 [The origins of the Ministry of Foreign Affairs, 1714–1808] (in Spanish). Madrid: Technical General Secretariat of the Ministry of Foreign Affairs. ISBN 978-84-95265-01-2.
