= Bangladesh–Spain relations =

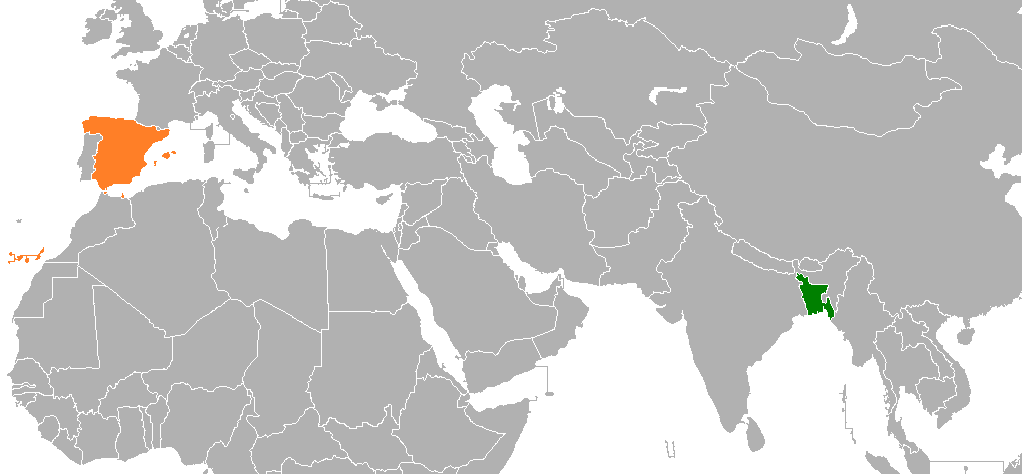

- Bangladesh: Spain

Bangladesh and Spain maintain diplomatic relations: Bangladesh has an embassy in Madrid and Spain has one in Dhaka.

== Economic relations ==
Both countries enjoy warm diplomatic relations. Spain planned an event in 2014 to promote investment in Bangladesh.

== Resident diplomatic missions ==
- Bangladesh has an embassy in Madrid.
- Spain has an embassy in Dhaka.
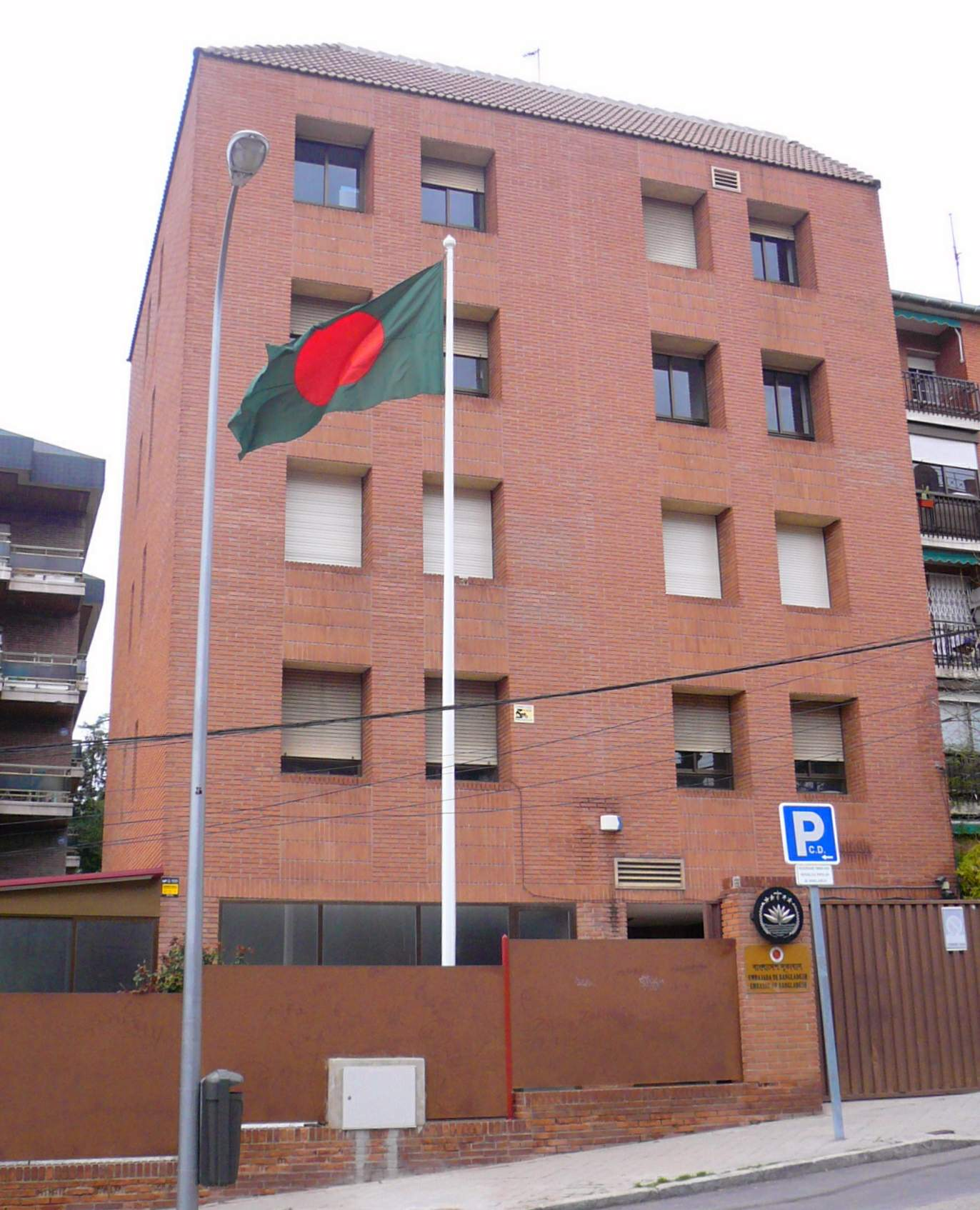
Embassy of Bangladesh in Madrid

== See also ==
- Foreign relations of Bangladesh
- Foreign relations of Spain
