= The Bahamas–Spain relations =

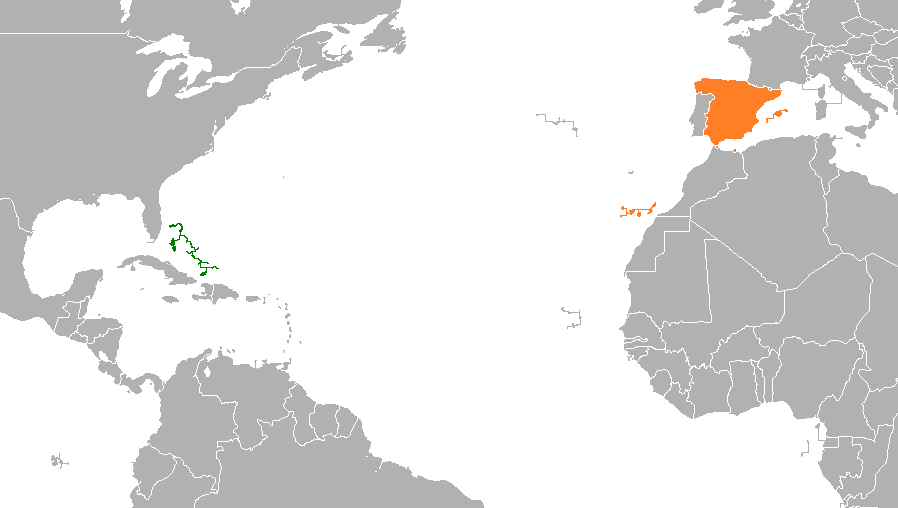

- Bahamas: Spain

Bilateral and diplomatic relations exist between The Bahamas and Spain. The Spanish embassy in Kingston, Jamaica, is accredited for The Bahamas.

== Historical relations ==
In 1492, Christopher Columbus landed on the shore of a small island, called Guanahani by the natives. Columbus named it San Salvador and claimed the island for Spain. There, Columbus subjected the Lucayans to the work of the search for gold. It is estimated that 40,000 arahuacos lost their lives by refusing to work in that company. The subsequent disappearance of the arahuacos, in just twenty-five years, and other peoples, was largely due to this and subsequent European expeditions to the region.

From the end of 15th century until the end of 18th century, the Bahamas were under Spanish sovereignty, although the islands, due to their strategic location on the "route of the Galleon", and for forming the An authentic island labyrinth archipelago, gradually they were transformed into hiding places and nests of pirates, buccaneers and filibusters, especially English. Thus in the 18th century, the loyalists who had left New England, because of the anti-British sentiments in that colony, were They moved to the islands. Due to the large number of British settlers on the islands, the sovereignty of the archipelago was transferred from Spain to United Kingdom, and the Bahamas were declared a British colony in 1784.

=== Toponymy ===
Initially the archipelago received from the Spanish the name of the eponymous population of the Lucayos, thus being called Lucayas Islands. The first inhabitants of the Lucayas Islands are also known as the Arawak Indians, who are believed to be the first settlers of the island. It is considered that the name "Bahamas" comes from a deformation of the words of Andalusian Spanish bajamar (low sea), since most of the islets of this archipelago are only sighted during the tide low or low tide.

== Diplomatic relations ==
Spain and The Bahamas established diplomatic relations on 1 December 1976.

The Embassy of Spain in Jamaica is accredited before the Government of The Bahamas. Ambassador Aníbal Jiménez Abascal presented credentials to the GG of The Bahamas on 17 April 2015. There is no resident Bahamian Embassy in Spain.

In March 2010, Spain and The Bahamas signed an Agreement on Exchange of Information on Tax Matters.

== Economic relations ==
Economic and commercial relations between Spain and The Bahamas are limited.

Main products exported from Spain to The Bahamas: mineral fuels; sea or river navigation; unspecified goods; machinery; ceramic products; optical instruments and apparatus, photography; footwear; alcoholic drinks; textile items.

Main products imported into The Bahamas from Spain: mineral fuels; alcoholic drinks; products of animal origin; sea or river navigation; machinery.

== Cooperation ==
Cooperation is channeled through the Spain Fund – Caribbean Community (CARICOM) of the Spanish Agency for International Development Cooperation (AECID). The interlocutor of the Spanish Cooperation is the CARICOM Secretariat, whose headquarters are in Georgetown (Guyana), and all the actions are included within the Regional Cooperation Program with CARICOM. This cooperation program is mainly aimed at supporting regional integration and institutional strengthening of the Caribbean Community.

At the end of 2005 AECID provided emergency assistance (personal hygiene kits, food, clothing and water) worth 50,000 euros to mitigate the effects of the Hurricane Wilma. The objective is that The Bahamas, like the other members of CARICOM, benefit from regional projects, such as the Regional Center for Advanced Technologies for High-Performance Crops (CEATA) for training in new agricultural technologies, in Jamaica, which includes Training seminars open to nationals of all CARICOM member countries.

In health, preferential attention has been given to noncommunicable diseases. The Project for the Prevention and Control of Cervical Cancer stands out due to its cross-sectional gender component.

Between 2007 and 2012 AECID funded the presence of a Spanish reader at the College of The Bahamas. Bahamian students can access the MAEC-AECID scholarships annually for the improvement of the Spanish language or for postgraduate studies in Spain. The Spanish Embassy in Kingston maintains open channels of collaboration with the College of The Bahamas in the field of support for learning Spanish.

A diplomatic officer of The Bahamas MAE has obtained a scholarship funded by the Santander Bank for the International Relations Master of the Diplomatic School, 2014/15 academic year. The Permanent Secretary of the Ministry of Tourism, Harrison Thompson, participated in the High Level Seminar on Innovative Practices in Tourism for the Caribbean held in Madrid from 9 to 14 June 2014. The Seminar was jointly organized by the Secretary of State for International Cooperation and for Latin America and the Secretary of State for Tourism, with the collaboration of Turespaña, SEGITTUR and the School of Industrial Organization.

== See also ==
- Foreign relations of The Bahamas
- Foreign relations of Spain
