= Jamaica–Spain relations =

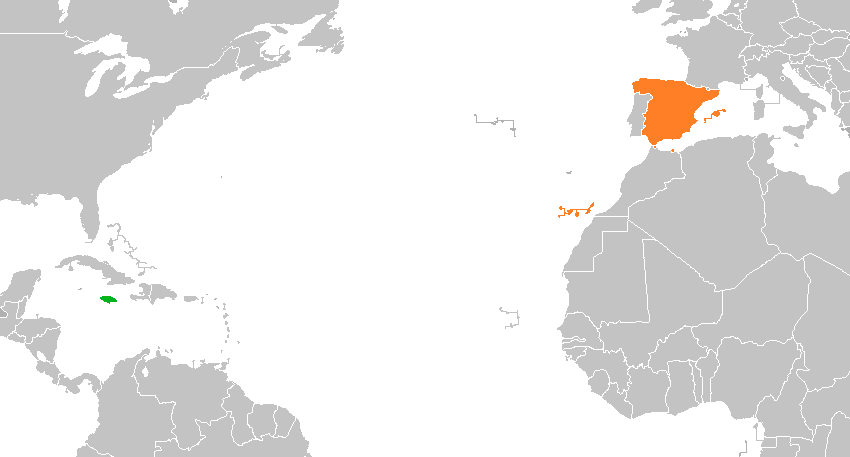

- Jamaica: Spain

Jamaica–Spain relations are the current and historical relationship between Jamaica and Spain.

Both countries highlight a degree of cooperation and friendship in cultural and commercial relations, expressing their commitment to favor the strengthening of ties between the Caribbean Community (CARICOM) and the Ibero-American General Secretariat (SEGIB).

== Resident diplomatic missions ==
- Jamaica is accredited to Spain from its embassy in Brussels, Belgium.
- Spain has an embassy in Kingston.

== See also ==
- Foreign relations of Jamaica
- Foreign relations of Spain
