= Guinea–Spain relations =

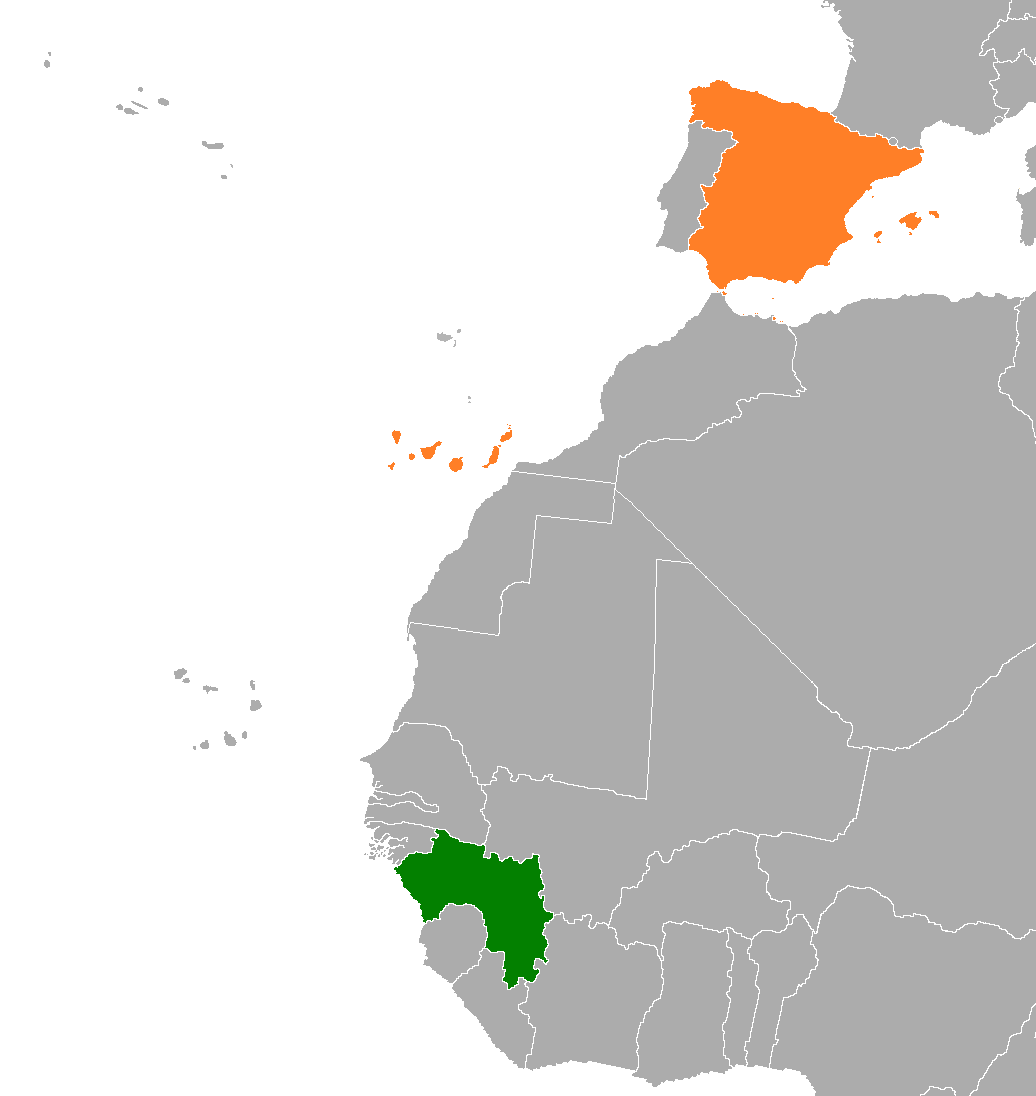
- Guinea: Spain

Guinea–Spain relations are the bilateral and diplomatic relations between these two countries. Guinea has an embassy in Madrid and honorary consulate in Barcelona, Las Palmas de Gran Canaria and Valencia. Spain has an embassy in Conakry.

== Diplomatic relations ==
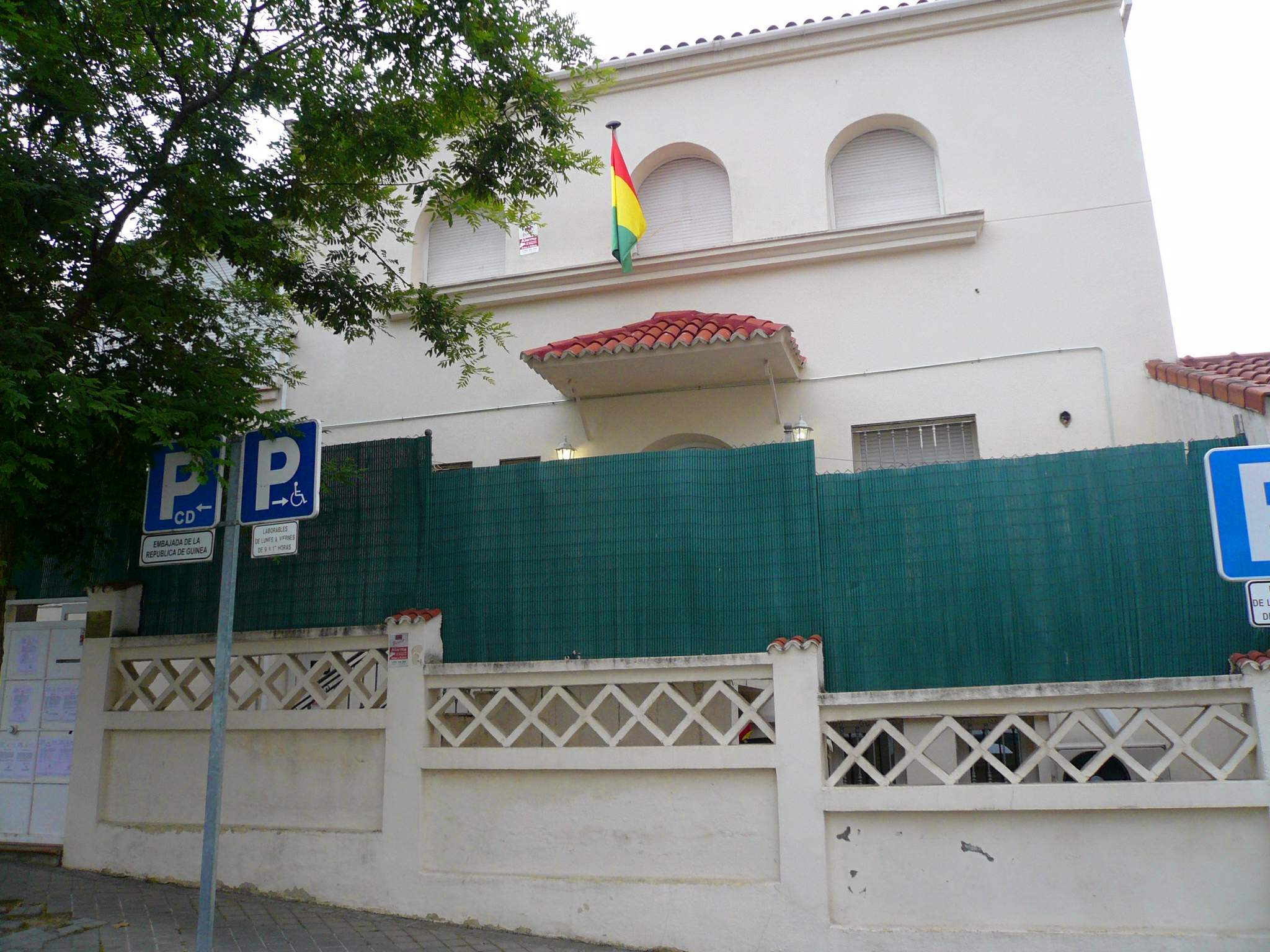
Embassy of Guinea in Madrid

Spain established diplomatic relations with the Republic of Guinea on February 10 of 1965.

In May 1979, Juan Carlos I and Queen Sofía of Spain traveled to Guinea and met with Guinean President Ahmed Sékou Touré in Conakry, where they attended the commemorations of the Guinean revolution as guests of honor. Touré credited Juan Carlos as the architect of the "nascent Spanish democracy", and expressed his desire to achieve a fishing agreement with Spain. Reporters mentioned the potential for more direct economic ties between the two countries.

In May 1982, Touré made an official visit to Spain, meeting with the Spanish royals. Juan Carlos reaffirmed liberty, equality and independence as basic principles of international relations, and called for further consolidation of the Organisation of African Unity, of which Guinea was a founding member. In parallel, a Guinean delegation led by Abdoulaye Touré met with the Spanish Minister of Foreign Affairs to discuss potential cooperation in the sectors of hydroelectric energy, agriculture, fisheries, and industry.

Following the death of Touré and the 1984 Guinean coup d'état, the junta of Lansana Conté assumed control of the country. Coronel Diarra Traoré, in his quality of Prime Minister, made a visit to Madrid in September 1984 to meet with the Spanish Minister of Foreign Affairs.

The opening of the Spanish Embassy in Conakry was an important milestone in relations between the two countries. The first resident Ambassador presented Credentials on December 14, 2007, and proceeded to the opening of the Foreign Ministry on February 15, 2008. The opening of the Embassy of Guinea in Madrid in 2009 was a reinforcement of bilateral relations. In 2013, Guinea appointed its first Ambassador to Spain.

In 2021, the Spanish Secretary of State for Foreign Affairs was received by Guinean president Alpha Condé to discuss the deepening of political, commercial and industrial ties between the two countries. In the wake of the exchange, the Spanish Agency for International Development Cooperation pledged financial aid to the IFRC to aid in the fight against the Ebola and COVID-19 epidemics in Guinea.

2021 Guinean coup

In the wake of the 2021 Guinean coup d'état, the Spanish government condemned the violence sparked by it, and called for the "immediate re-establishment of the constitutional order and of the democratic institutions of the Republic of Guinea." The government further associated itself with ECOWAS in calling for the return of Guinean soldiers to their barracks, and recommended not to travel to the country and to shelter in place until new order.

== Cooperation ==
=== Development aid ===
Spanish cooperation began in the country as a result of the implementation of the Action Plan of the Euro-African Conference on Migration of Rabat. After the visit of the Minister of Foreign Affairs in October 2006, Spain began to carry out a cooperation program with the country for a total of 5 million euros. This commitment was the starting point for Spanish Cooperation in the country, being reaffirmed by the incorporation of Guinea into the 2009-2012 Master Plan as a group B country (focused association). The aid pledged by Spain in Guinea between 2008 and 2013 exceeded €27 million. Some multilateral projects channeled through the World Bank and ECOWAS.

=== Immigration ===
Immigration is an important theme in Guinea-Spain relations. In 2018, according to the United Nations High Commissioner for Refugees, 1 in 4 migrants to Spain transited from Guinea, and 1 in 10 migrants to Europe transited from Guinea.

Following consultations between the Spanish Minister of Foreign Affairs and his Guinean counterpart, Spain and Guinea signed a cooperation agreement on migration in 2006. As part of the agreement, Guinean authorities committed to immediately sending a team to accelerate the repatriation of 156 Guineans from the Canary Islands, and Spain pledged 5 million euros to Guinea, with 20 more for the development of the zone.

=== Security cooperation ===
In 2019, the Minister of the Interior of Spain, Fernando Grande-Marlaska, met with Guinean president Alpha Condé to reinforce bilateral cooperation in the fight against terrorism, organized crime, the management of migration flows and the fight against the trafficking of illegal migrants. The result of this visit was a bilateral cooperation agreement on security and the fight against crime, and the establishment of a mixed, technical commission of Spanish and Guinese officials to identify areas of further cooperation on security issues. In 2020, Spain tripled its funds to African countries to contain irregular migration; due to Guinea being one of the largest countries of provenience of migrants to Spain, the Ministry of Interior of Spain increased funding for the National Police Academy of Guinea.

== Trade ==
All imports from Guinea to Spain are duty-free and quota-free, with the exception of armaments, as part of the Everything but Arms initiative of the European Union.

== High-level visits ==
Presidential and Prime Ministerial visits from Guinea to Spain

- President Ahmed Sékou Touré (1982)
- Prime Minister Diarra Traoré (1984)

Royal visits from Spain to Guinea

- King Juan Carlos I (1979)

== Agreements ==
Over the years, Guinea and Spain have signed several bilateral agreements: a Framework agreement on justice cooperation and extradition (1995), a Cooperation agreement on immigration (2006), a Bilateral debt reduction agreement (2018), and an Agreement on tackling security cooperation and combating organized crime (2019).

== See also ==
- Foreign relations of Guinea
- Foreign relations of Spain
