= Mauritania–Spain relations =

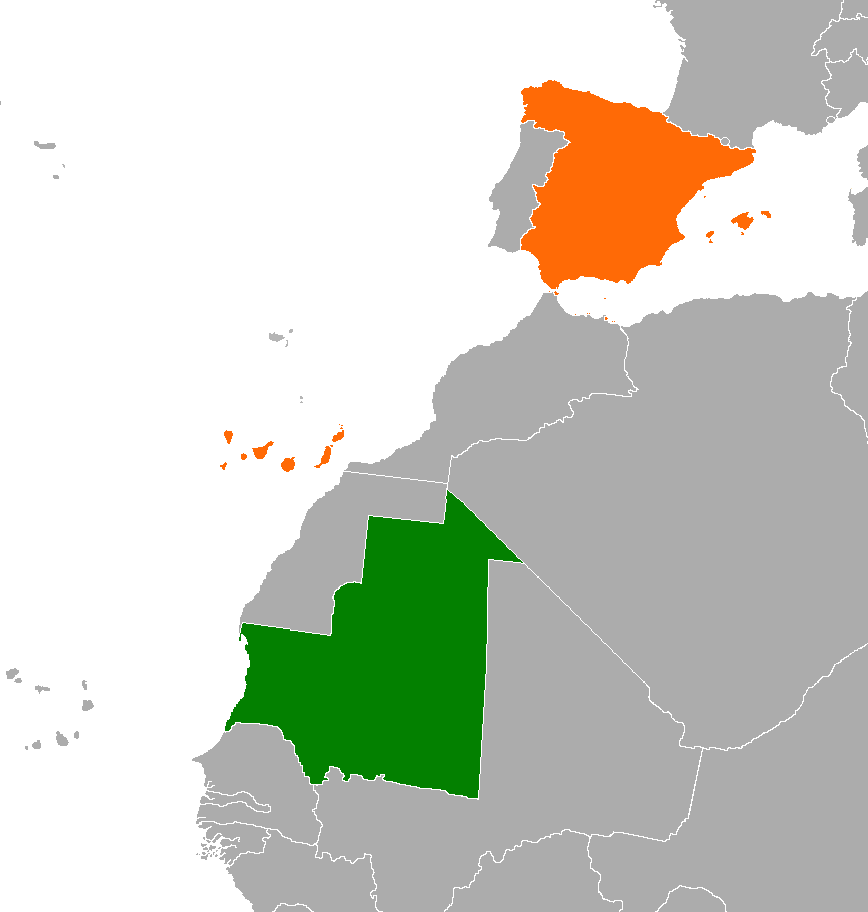
- Mauritania: Spain

Mauritania–Spain relations are the foreign relations between Mauritania and Spain. The two nations have had official diplomatic relations since the 1960s. Spain has an embassy in Nouakchott and a consulate-general in Nouadhibou. Mauritania has an embassy in Madrid and a consulate-general in Las Palmas.

== History ==
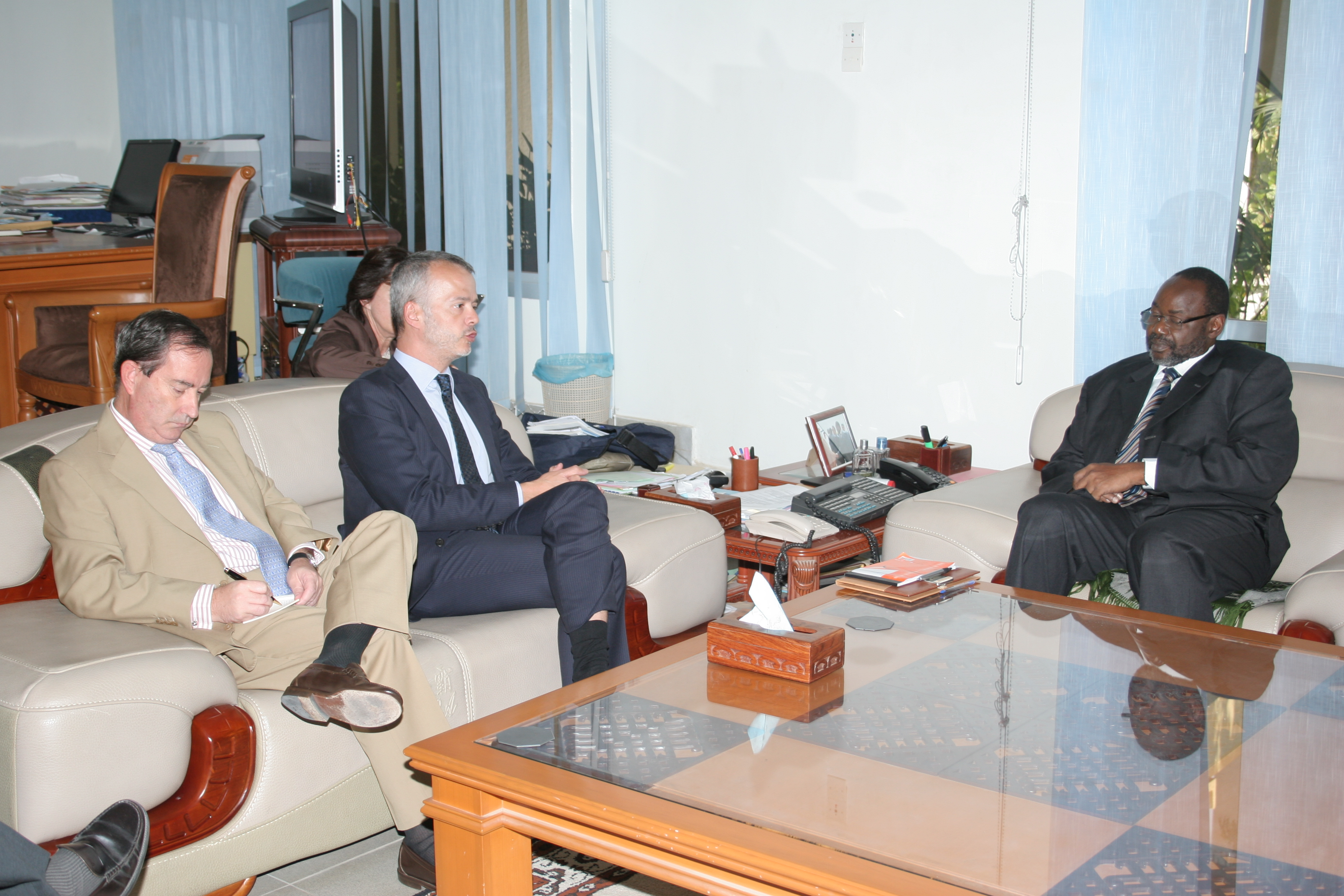
Spanish envoys meeting with the minister of the Interior of Mauritania Ould Beilil in 2011

Spain officially recognised Mauritanian independence in November 1960, and the first Spanish ambassador presented his credential letter in 1961. The Mauritanian claim over the Western Sahara territory formulated at the United Nations in 1963 mainly obeyed to the logic of blocking Morocco's own claim over the territory, that, if successful, may also propel the Moroccan irredentist claim over Mauritania itself, with the Mauritanian diplomacy fearing over the possibility of a Spanish-Moroccan understanding. The position of Mauritania in regards of the Sahara hardened in the 1970s, demanding a referendum of self-determination and, by 1972, the country had already reconciled with Morocco. In the 1975 Madrid Accords, Spain ceded the administration over the territory to Morocco and Mauritania.

During the 1978 OAU summit, Mauritania denied the labeling of the Canary Islands as a territory to be decolonised as well as it denied the recognition of the MPAIAC as a "movement of national liberation".

More recently, Spain has privileged the strengthening of bilateral relations on the basis of the importance of the African country, that features a sea border with the Canary Islands, in regards of the managing of irregular immigration.

In March 2022, Mauritanian president Mohamed Ould Ghazouani visited Spain—the first visit by a Mauritanian head of State since 2008—meeting with king Felipe VI and prime minister Pedro Sánchez. Both countries signed a memorandum of understanding aiming to boost cultural cooperation. Following the 2022 visit, the Spanish Council of Ministers submitted the text of a Treaty of Friendship, Good Neighborliness and Cooperation with Mauritania to the Cortes Generales for parliamentary ratification. It was an update of an unratified 2008 treaty put on hold because of the 2008 Mauritanian coup d'état.

On 16 July 2025, members of both countries' governments held their first high-level meeting in Nouakchott.

== Economic relations ==
Spain is a major trading partner, taking up 4.1% of Mauritanian exports, and providing about 5.1% of imports. All imports from Mauritania to Spain are duty-free and quota-free, with the exception of armaments, as part of the Everything but Arms initiative of the European Union.

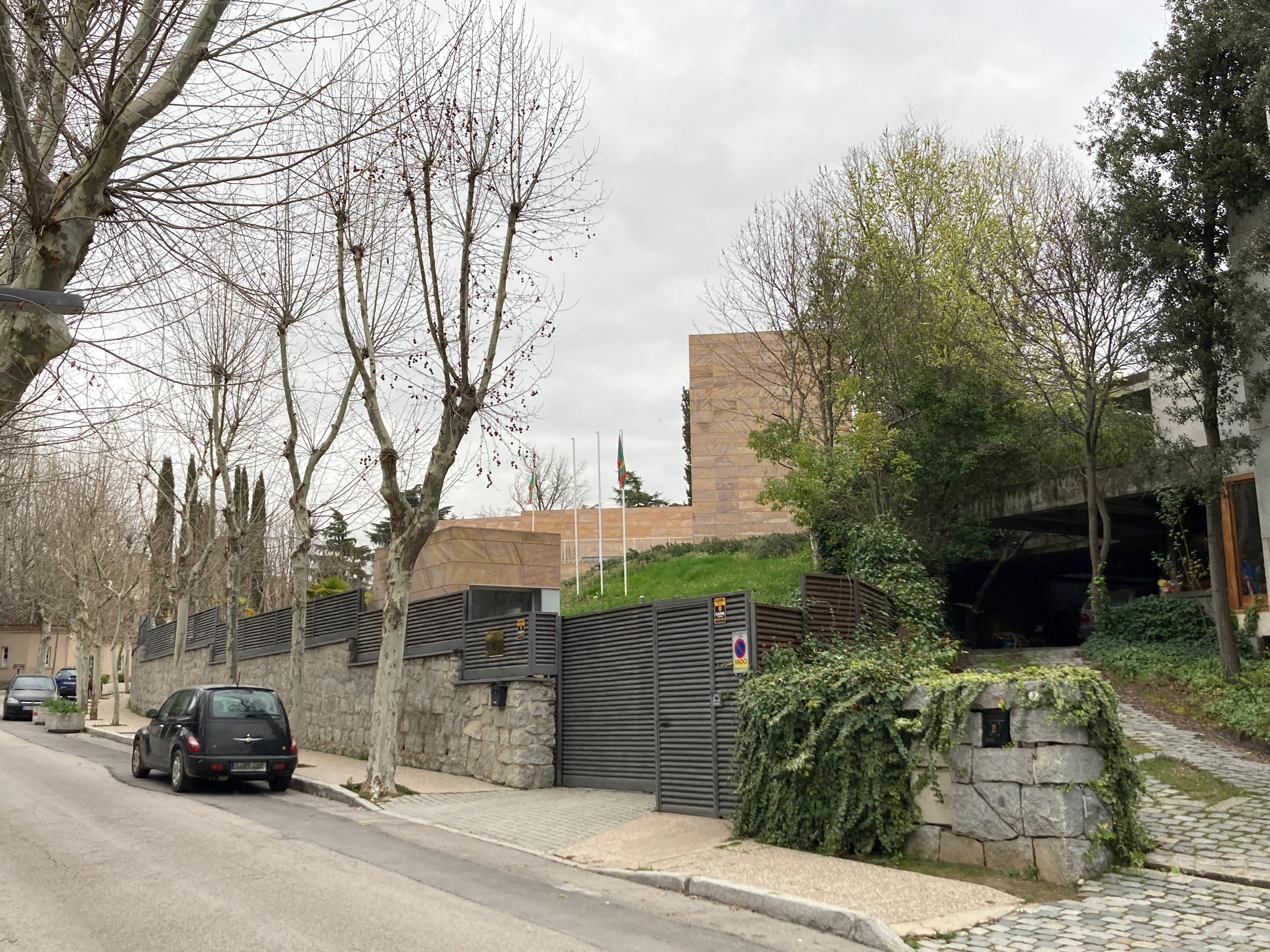
Embassy of Mauritania in Madrid

== See also ==
- Foreign relations of Mauritania
- Foreign relations of Spain

== Bibliography ==
- Hernando de Larramendi, Miguel; Planet, Ana I. (2007). "Las relaciones hispano-mauritanas (1960-2006)". Anales de Historia Contemporánea. 23. Murcia: Universidad de Murcia. ISSN 0212-6559.
- Hernando de Larramendi, Miguel; Planet, Ana I. (2009). "España y Mauritania. Sáhara, pesca, inmigración y desarrollo en el centro de la agenda bilateral" (PDF). Documentos CIDOB. CIDOB. ISSN 1696-9979.
