= Foreign relations of Spain =

The foreign relations of Spain could be constructed upon the foreign relations of the Hispanic Crown. The personal union of Castile and Aragon that ensued with the joint rule of the Catholic Monarchs was followed by the annexation of the Kingdom of Granada and the Kingdom of Navarre. The crown also built a large colonial empire in the Americas after the arrival of Columbus to the New World in 1492.

The Spanish Habsburg monarchs had large holdings across the European continent stemming from the inherited dominions of the Habsburg monarchy and from the Aragonese holdings in the Italian Peninsula. The Habsburg dynasty fought against the Protestant Reformation in the continent and achieved a dynastic unification of the realms of the Iberian Peninsula with their enthronement as Portuguese monarchs after 1580. The American colonies shipped bullion, but resources were spent in wars waged against France in Italy and elsewhere as well as in conflicts against the Ottoman Empire, England or revolts in the Spanish Netherlands, Portugal (lost after 1640) and Catalonia (lost in 1640 and recovered after 1652). Mainland Spain was the main theatre of the War of Spanish Succession (1701–1714), after which the Bourbon dynasty consolidated rule, while handing in holdings in Italy and the Netherlands. The successive Bourbon Family Compacts underpinned a close alignment with the Kingdom of France throughout the 18th century. During the Napoleonic Wars, Mainland Spain was occupied by the French Empire (which installed a puppet ruler), and became after an 1808 uprising the main theatre of the Peninsular War. Nearly all its colonies fought for and won independence in the early 19th century. From then on it kept Cuba, Puerto Rico and the Philippines, otherwise lost in 1898 after the Spanish–American War, and, in line with far-reaching efforts by other European powers, Spain began to sustain a colonial presence in the African continent, most notably in Western Sahara and Equatorial Guinea. It also intervened in Nguyễn Vietnam alongside France and involved in the affairs of former colony Santo Domingo, which briefly returned to Spanish control from 1861 to 1865. In the wake of the creation of a Spanish protectorate in Northern Morocco, the early 20th century saw a draining conflict against Riffian anti-colonial resistance. Spain stuck to a status of neutrality during World War I.

The Spanish Civil War of 1936–1939 became a proxy war between the axis powers Germany and Italy and the Soviet Union (which lost). The war ensued with the installment of a dictatorship under Francisco Franco lasting until 1975. In the aftermath of World War 2, the series of multilateral agreements and institutions configuring what it is known today as Western Europe were made apart from Francoist Spain. The 1953 military agreements with the United States entailed the acceptance of unprecedented conditions vis-à-vis the (peacetime) military installment of a foreign power on Spanish soil. Spain joined the UN in 1955 and the IMF in 1958. In the last rales of the dictator, the mismanaged decolonisation of Spanish Sahara ensued with the Moroccan invasion of the territory in 1975 and the purported partition of it between Morocco and Mauritania, spawning a protracted conflict pitting the Sahrawi national liberation Polisario Front against Morocco and (briefly) Mauritania lasting to this day. Spain joined NATO (1982) and entered the European Communities (1986).

On a wide range of issues, Spain often prefers to coordinate its efforts with its EU partners through the European political cooperation mechanisms. In addition to being represented via EU membership, Spain is a permanently invited guest to all G20 summits.

== History ==
In 218 BC the Romans invaded the Iberian Peninsula, which later became the Roman province of Hispania. The Romans introduced the Latin language, the ancestor of both modern-day Spanish and Italian. The Iberian peninsula remained under Roman rule for over 600 years, until the collapse of the Western Roman Empire.

In the Early modern period, until the 18th century, southern and insular Italy came under Spanish control, having been previously a domain of the Crown of Aragon.

=== Habsburg Spain ===
In contrast with the purely Mediterranean focused foreign policy of the Catholic kings, during Habsburg Spain era, the foreign policy of the Spanish Empire turned more continental and was defined by the support to the Habsburg monarchy in its patrimonial conflicts and participation in the Religious wars in Europe, specially the Holy Roman Empire's struggles against the Ottomans, the German Protestants and the French–Austrian rivalry. During the Spanish Golden Age, the main objectives of its foreign policy were:

Geopolitic map of the Spanish Empire at its Siglo de oro.

- The consolidation of Spanish/Iberian influence in the Mediterranean (Italian Peninsula and Maghreb) and Western-Central Europe (Netherlands-Burgundy and Habsburg Austria) against the Franco-Ottoman alliance, and in Oversea (Americas and Philippines) against English, Dutch and Portuguese colonialists.
- The expelling of the Ottomans from the Balkans with the help of Safavid Iran, Poland-Lithuania and Eastern Catholic dissidency (being considered the conquests of former Aragonese territories and the Holy Land), liberating the Patriarch of Constantinople from the Sultan and supporting the reunification between Catholic and Orthodox Churches.
- Support the Council of Trent dispositions and goals about the Re-Catholicisation of the States of the Holy Roman Empire, England and Scandinavia to restore the unity among the Res publica Christiana in Western civilisation according to Counter-Reformation. Also oppose to French Gallicanism and Raison d'Stat, in favour of Ultramontan and Universitas christiana's views to lead the Christendom .
- Evangelisate the New World, East Asia and Africa into Catholicism, with the special help of the Franciscans and Jesuits (which had a lot of pro-Spanish influence through the House of Loyola). Secure the Tordesillas' Iberian monopoly and rights against hostile European or Local Great Powers (which included to support Portugal against Muslims or Pagans). Being considered possible conquests in Ming China, Moluccas, Sulawesi, Cambodia, Borneo, Siam, Japan, Oceanian realm, Kongo, Ethiopia, Safavid Iran, North America, among others (or at least to turn them into allies and develop trade routes).
- The restoration of the Roman Empire through supporting the consolidation of the HRE as an Unified and Universal monarchy under Spanish patronage or leadership (only with Charles V), with possible pretensions of World domination through an association with the Iberian Union oversea empire.

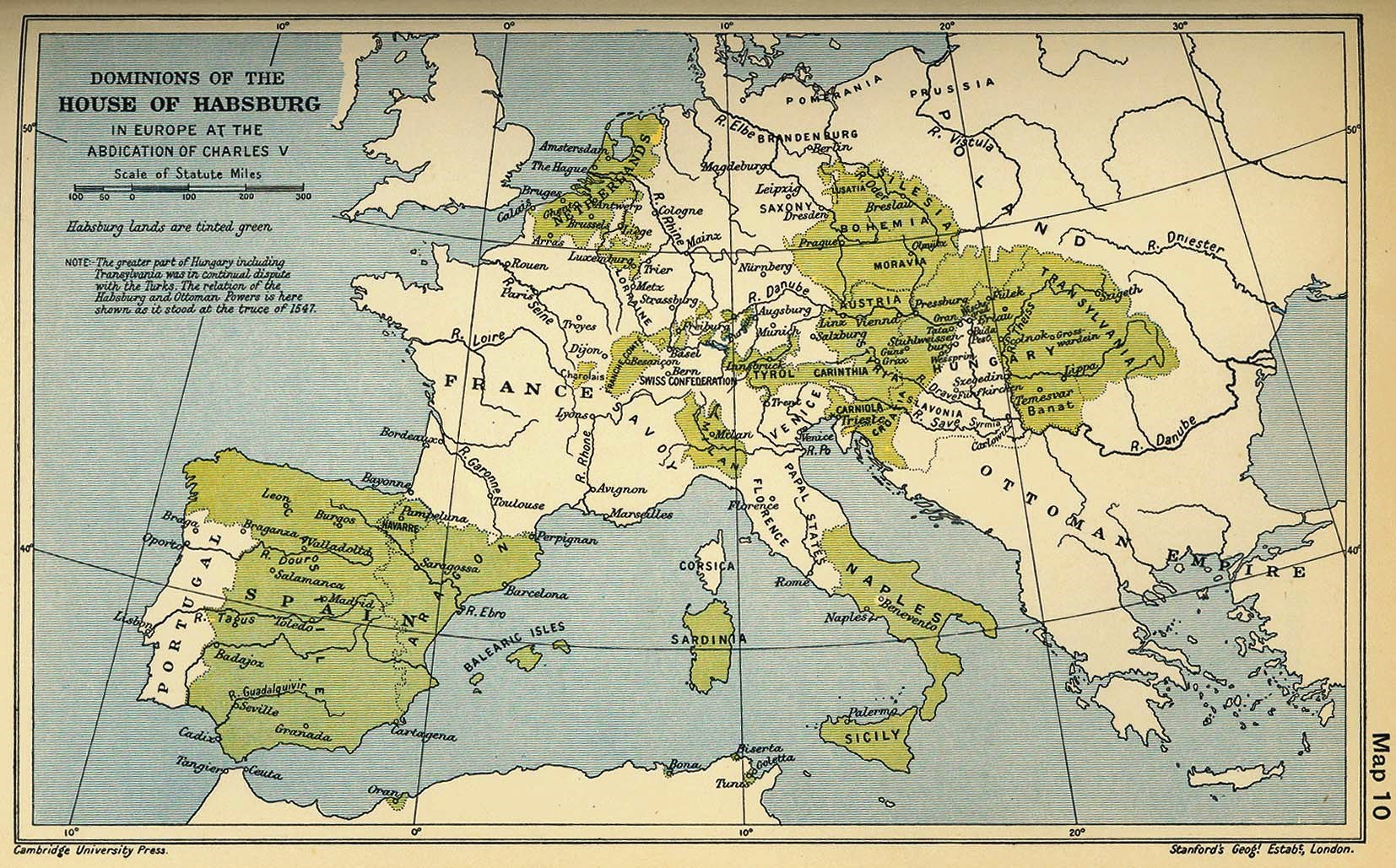
Dominions of the Habsburgs in 1556

==== Charles V ====
Charles V (1500–1558) inherited vast lands across Western Europe and the Americas, and expanded them by frequent wars. Among other domains he was King of Spain from 1516, and Holy Roman Emperor and Archduke of Austria from 1519. As head of the rising House of Habsburg during the first half of the 16th century, his dominions in Europe extending from Germany to northern Italy with direct rule over the Austrian hereditary lands and the Burgundian Low Countries, and a unified Spain with its southern Italian kingdoms of Naples, Sicily, and Sardinia.

Charles V imperial ideology was based in the Universal monarchy, with influences from Dante Alighieri and Erasmus' Christian humanism, which supported Ghibelline Political theory that given the Universal power firstly to the Monarch and then to the Pope. This provoked an initial conflict between the HRE and the Papal States, as a continuation of the medieval dispute over Dominium mundi in which Spain took the side of the Empire over the Church (opposing to the Political theology of the Doctrine of Two Swords). This initial bad reputation of regalist and cripto-heretic, added to his foreign origins, provocated the initial resistance of Spaniards to join to the Charles V Empire. After the reconciliation of the HRE and Spain with the Papacy, Spain take a relevant position as the dominant power of the imperial project, overcoming the Kingdom of Germany (divided by the Protestant Reform) in the protagonism of Charles V's foreign policy (but at the cost of the resignation of Mercurino di Gattinara, main ideologue, from the Spanish Cortes).

His great enemy on land was France, on the Mediterranean Sea it was the Ottoman Empire, which at times was allied with France. England and the Papacy were sometimes part of the coalition against him. Much of his attention focused on wars in Italy. At the Diet of Augsburg (1547) he secured recognition that the Netherlands belonged to the Hapsburg domain. However Charles was intensely Catholic and the northern Netherlands was Protestant. He and his Spanish heirs fought for a century against Dutch independence; despite the enormous cost they failed.

The Anti-Islamic foreign policy was perceived as a continuation of the Reconquista, in which the main objective of Spain was the continuation of such campaign until conquering the former Roman Tingitana (modern Morocco), which was politically linked to the former Roman Hispania. Another goal was reconquering all Early Muslim conquests for the Christendom (inspired in the Crusading movement) which would end in the deposition of the Ottoman Caliphate after a crossing of North Africa and the Balkans to the Holy Land by a Holy League of all Europe led by Spain and a Habsburg–Persian alliance in a total victory. However, due to the French–Habsburg rivalry across Europe making division and debiliting Habsburg Austria, such ambitious project of a great anti-Ottoman coalition never materialized. So, the Realpolitik turned into a Spanish–Ottoman struggle for the domination over the Mediterranean Sea, specially the attempts to conquer the Barbary states and the constant defense of the Italian states from Ottoman raids.

In Oversea, Charles foreign policy was determinated by the Carreira de Indias global rivalry with the Portuguese Empire (specially in the Indonesian Archipelago and in Colonial Brazil), having to renounce some expansionist projects (like the claims of Spain over the Spice islands after the Treaty of Zaragoza) for the sake of having good relations with the Kingdom of Portugal.

==== Philip II, 1556–1598 ====
During Philip II, Spain developed a big compromise as the main promotor of Catholic Counter-Reformation among Europe, defining an imperial ideology according to the teachings of the Council of Trent and Traditionalist Catholicism. Spanish foreign policy during the reign of Philip II was developed in two phases. In phase 1, between the 1560s and early 1570s, priority was given to the defense of the Mediterranean and the rivalry with the Ottoman Empire, which was resolved in favor of the Christian forces after the victory at Lepanto. In phase 2, between the late 1570s to 1590s, priority was given to consolidating Spanish control in the Atlantic and the expansion of Catholicism in the New World and the Indies (while also reacting against Protestant expansion in Western Europe).

The Anti-Islamic foreign policy of Philip II led to support a greater integration of the Italian states for the development of an Espionage system through the Spain–Turkey diplomatic envoys (being important the Ragusa Republic as an intermediary), wanting to instigate anti-Ottoman revolts in Albania or Greece and coup d'etats to the Sublime Porte, while reactivating the Habsburg–Persian alliance, to prepare the possible collapse of the Turks in the Ottoman–Venetian War (1570–1573). However the Venetian focus in its own interests in the Stato da Màr, instead of an Universitas Christianna perspective, disbanded the Holy League of 1571.

The Anti-Protestant foreign policy led to a clash with England (developing Philip II a personal enmity with Elizabeth I for betraying her Catholic sister and Philip's wife, Mary I of England) and with the Dutch, while also a Spanish intervention in the French Wars of Religion (siding with the Catholic League against Huguenots and Politiques) and other minor religious conflicts (like the Cologne War). Also it led to the biggest expansion of Spain's diplomatic area, developing alliances with pro-Habsburg Italian states and Catholic Swiss Cantons, while starting routine embassies to North Europe and East Europe for the first time (having interests in defending Holy See's interests in Denmark–Norway, Sweden and Poland-Lithuania).

Also, during this time the Polysynodial System was consolidated in the Hispanic Monarchy, largely due to the importance that acquired the foreign policy of the Spanish Empire across different Geopolitical units (and also the Foral nature of Spain as a Composite monarchy instead of a modern state, in which non-Castilian states had their own social sovereign, laws and politics). This led to the development of 13 different councils with responsibilities in the Netherlands, Italy, Portugal, America and Philippines, etc. The struggle for the control of Spanish foreign policy let to Internal conflicts in the Spanish nobility, as becoming Secretary of those Councils symbolised that their holders were very trusted by the King. Also the duty of those diplomats evolved into activities of Espionage and the development of communication networks to consolidate Spain's Sphere of influence across Europe and the World.

For 16th-century Europe, we cannot speak of states as we understand them today. In the domains of Philip II, as I have mentioned, power was structured in several councils; that is, it was organized according to a polysynodal system in which changes were even more pronounced. (...) Of all of them, the one of greatest interest in this work is the Council of State, which, among its many responsibilities, advised on relations with other princes or territories. (...) Based on these councils and the king's inner circle, the presence of the royal secretaries is noteworthy. These individuals became an institution in themselves and attained a power, in the monarch's shadow, that significantly surpassed that of some of the aforementioned councils. (...) From this centralized core emerged a second administration. This administration, following the dictates of high-ranking officials, maintained a physical presence in various foreign territories, staffed by ambassadors, secretaries, and a vast underground network of informants and spies. This is yet another example of how diplomacy during this period was a blend of foreign representation and espionage, quite unlike our understanding of it today (...) Ultimately, it was upon these two great foundations that the principal undertakings of the reign were carried out. These undertakings, by their very nature, encompassed everything from mere symbolic acts aimed at sealing marriage alliances to conspiratorial activities that sought the overthrow of sovereigns and the reinstatement of supporters aligned with Catholicism.

— Borja Oliván Aniés

On Oversea, Philip II did reforms about the Asiento de Negros in benefit of Portuguese Africans, made stronger regulations against the entrance of foreigners in the Spanish Empire (due to the Piracy at the Anglo-Spanish War) while also adopted Protectionist politics to limit the growing of Chinese economic power in the Philippines and then in Spanish America. Also was developed the Junta de Guerra de Indias to protect Spanish Empire from the Dutch empire raids and confront them around the World (turning Eighty Years' War into a global war). Another important matter was the tiny rivalry between Spain and the Portuguese Empire (and then between the Council of Castile and the Council of Portugal) about the Sphere of influence over Southeast Asia and South America, being developed inner conflicts due to the difficults to develop a common foreign policy there because differents conceptions of what was "local" policy and "global" one, becoming a struggle the assimilation of the Kingdom of Portugal in the Iberian Union due to the discussions to delimit the boundaries between inner and foreign policy there, without harming the Foral civil law.

==== Philip III, 1598–1621 ====
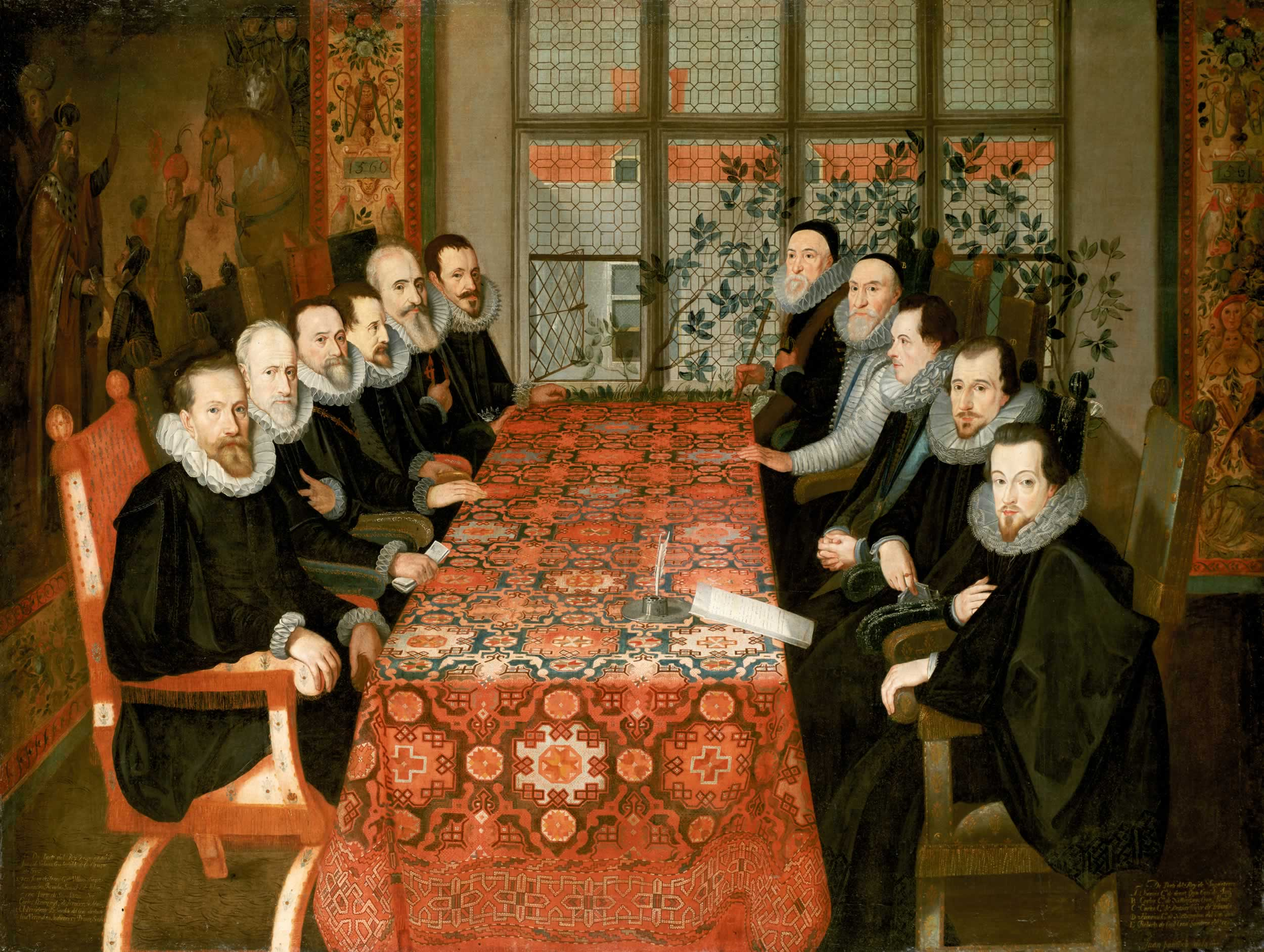
The Somerset House Conference between English and Spanish diplomats that brought an end to the Anglo–Spanish War (1585–1604).

Philip III has a poor reputation in terms of both domestic and foreign policy. He inherited two major conflicts from his father. The first of these, the long-running Dutch revolt, represented a serious challenge to Spanish power from the Protestant United Provinces in a crucial part of the Spanish Empire. The second, the Anglo–Spanish War was a newer, and less critical conflict with Protestant England, marked by a Spanish failure to successfully bring its huge military resources to bear on the smaller English military.

Philip's own foreign policy can be divided into three phases. For the first nine years of his reign, he pursued a highly aggressive set of policies, aiming to deliver a 'great victory'. His instructions to his most important advisor Duke Lerma to wage a war of "blood and iron" on his rebellious subjects in the Netherlands reflects this. After 1609, when it became evident that Spain was financially exhausted and Philip sought a truce with the Dutch, there followed a period of retrenchment; in the background, tensions continued to grow, however, and by 1618 the policies of Philip's 'proconsols' were increasingly at odds with de Lerma's policy from Madrid.

On oversea, the projects to consolidate trade routes in the Indo-Pacific became a priority over the traditional Spanish foreign policy of secure the Transatlantic crossing, becoming an urgent the defense of the Portuguese Empire (specially Portuguese Malacca and Hormuz) in the Iberian Union against the Dutch or English with their local allies, and a better integration of the Spanish Philippines with Peninsular Spain (without depending on New Spain through the Manila galleon, nor the Port of Callao in Peru, to have better benefits from the China–Spain relations) while developing a great armada to protect both Philippines and Portuguese India. Another foreign policy was to make stronger the Patronato real in the Colonial cabildos in perjudge of the Hierarchy of the Catholic Church (becoming more powerful the Spanish Crown over the Holy See in the religious policy). Also the foreign policy in the Mediterranean was deeply integrated in the main objectives of re-starting the Spanish–Ottoman wars (although in a lesser scale, focusing in the combat against Barbary corsairs and minor conquests in Algeria), the intervention in the affairs of Morocco (supporting sometimes the Republic of Salé) and the Italian states (supporting the interests of Genoa and Savoy against France, Venice and Switzerland) and attempts to consolidate Spanish Sicily-Naples Sphere of influence in the Adriatic Sea (developing a rivalry against the Venetians at the time of the 3rd Duke of Osuna's rule). Despite, also Philip III promoted the development of Flemish and German consulates in Seville, trying to integrate the Spanish economical circuits with the ones of the HRE on the eve of the Thirty Years' War.

=== Bourbon Spain ===
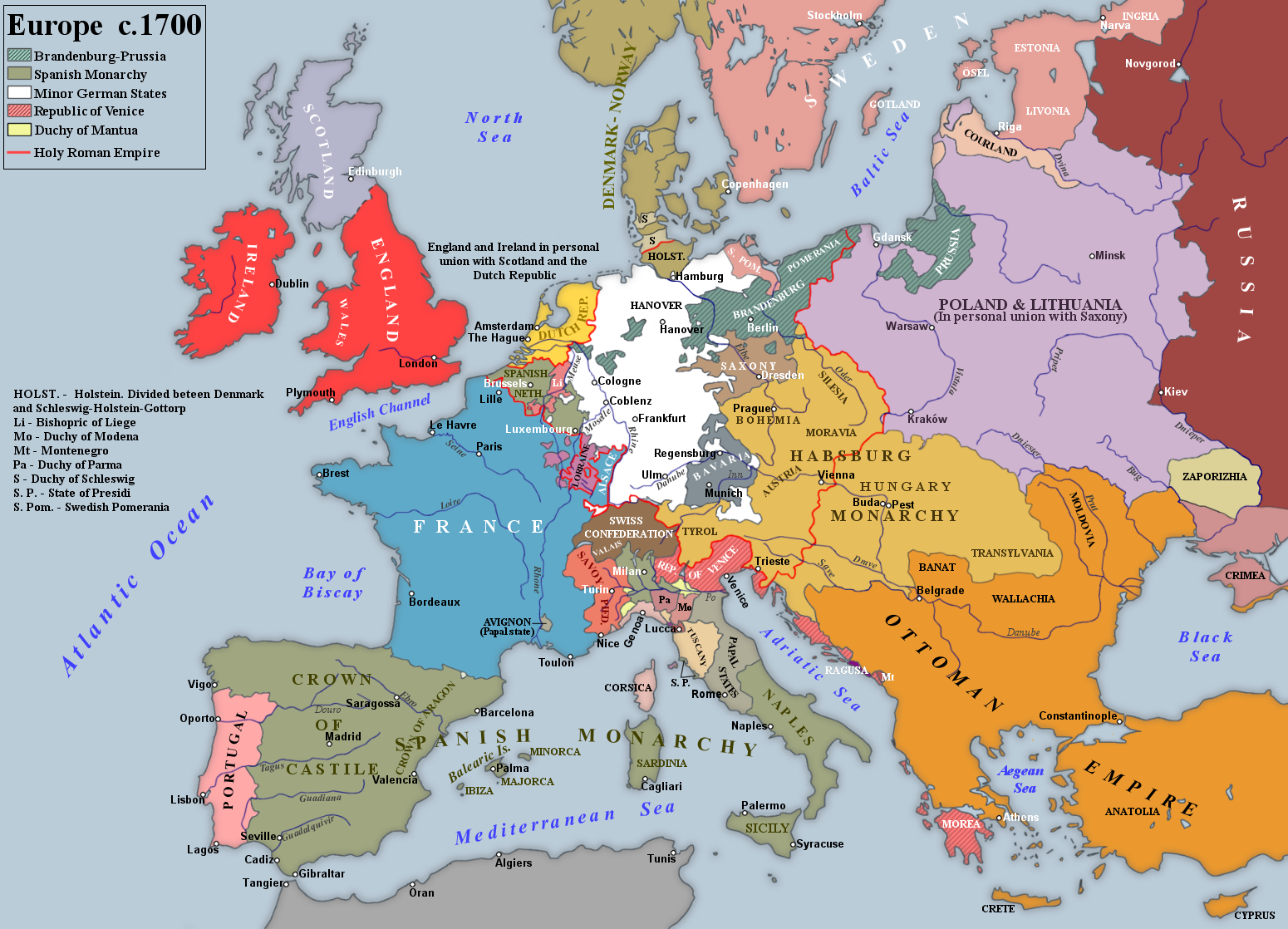
Europe in 1701 at the beginning of the War of the Spanish Succession

==== War of the Spanish Succession and after 1701–1759 ====
The War of the Spanish Succession (1701–1714) saw Spain in a nearly helpless position as multiple European powers battled for control over which of three rivals would be king. At first most of the warfare took place outside of Spain. However, in 1704 Spain was invaded by the Germans (officially by the Holy Roman Empire including Habsburg Austria and Prussia, as well as other minor German states), Great Britain, the Dutch Republic, the Duchy of Savoy and Portugal. The invaders wanted to make the Habsburg candidate king instead of the incumbent Philip V who the grandson of France's powerful king Louis XIV and candidate of the House of Bourbon. Spain had no real army, but it defense was a high priority for Louis XIV who sent in his French armies and after a devastating civil war eventually drove out the invaders from Spain.

After years of warfare and changing coalitions, the final result was that Philip V remained king. In practice his wife Elisabeth Farnese ruled Spain from 1714 until 1746, and was more interested in Italy than Spain. Spain was not even invited to the peace treaties (Peace of Utrecht); they forbade any future possibility of unifying the French and Spanish crowns. Britain was the main winner; it blocked France from becoming too powerful. Britain acquired Minorca and Gibraltar from Spain, as well as the right to sell slaves to Spanish colonies. Britain also gained Newfoundland and Nova Scotia from France. Spain kept its American colonies but lost its European holdings in Italy and the Spanish Netherlands (modern Belgium), mostly to Austria. Spain briefly regained some Italian holdings until the British sank its fleet in 1718. Elisabeth Farnese succeeded in recapturing Naples and Sicily. She put her son on the throne there. He abdicated in 1759 to return to Madrid as King Charles III of Spain.

==== American Revolutionary War: 1775–1783 ====
Eager to gain revenge on the British for its defeat during the Seven Years' War, France offered support to rebel American colonists seeking independence from Britain during the American War of Independence and in 1778 entered the war on their side. They then urged Spain to do the same, hoping the combined force would be strong enough to overcome the British Royal Navy and be able to invade England. In 1779 Spain joined the war, hoping to take advantage of a substantially weakened Britain. Distrustful of republics, Spain did not officially recognize the new United States of America.

A well-organised force under Bernardo de Galvez operating out of Spanish Louisiana launched repeated attacks on British colonies in the Caribbean and the Gulf of Mexico. They were easy winners against weak British garrisons, and were planning an expedition against Jamaica when peace was declared in 1783.

Spain's highest priority was to recapture Gibraltar from Britain using the Great Siege of Gibraltar. Despite a prolonged besiegement, the British garrison there was able to hold out until relieved and it remained in British hands following the Treaty of Paris. Unlike their French allies (for whom the war proved largely to be a disaster, financially and militarily) the Spanish made a number of territorial gains, recovering Florida and Menorca.

=== Modern Spain ===
==== 20th century ====
After the isolationist position taken by Spain in the 19th century, in 1898 (after the Spanish–American War) it was developed a more active foreign policy, focused in the consolidation of Spanish colonial interests in North Africa, trying to correct the errors of Antonio Cánovas del Castillo's foreign policy of the late 19th century (in which the Spanish colonies were consided as something related to the purely inner policy) and also changing the pro-Triple Alliance views of Alfonso XII to a pro-Entente views in the International relations of Europe. A neutral country during World War I, Spain was not invited to take part in the 1919 Paris Peace Conference, owing to the country's relative low profile in international affairs. It was however invited to join the League of Nations as a non-permanent member and it formally did so on 14 August 1919. During the so-called Wilsonian moment in international relations, forces adversarial to the Spanish State such as the Rifis vying for international recognition of their proto-republic and the Catalan separatist movement emboldened.

After Franco's death in 1975 and the integration of democracy, its foreign policy changed. The new government ended Spain's diplomatic isolation, strengthening its relations with western Europe, normalizing connections with neighboring countries, aiming to become a ember of the European and transatlantic institutions In 1982 Spain joined NATO and in 1986 it became a member of the European Communities. During the 1990s and 2000s Spain expanded its connections and influence in Latin America and the Middle East, also participating in NATO operations. Under the government led by Prime Minister José María Aznar, Spain participated in the 1999 Kosovo war, later backing the US invasion to Iraq in 2003.

Following the 2004 Madrid train bombings and the election of José Luis Rodríguez Zapatero, Spain withdrew its forces from Iraq. However it did participate in the war in Afghanistan and supporting NATO and the European Union.

== Regional relations ==
=== Latin America ===
==== The Ibero-American vision ====
Spain has maintained its special identification with its fellow Spanish-speaking countries. Its policy emphasizes the concept of an Ibero-American community, essentially the renewal of the historically liberal concept of "Hispano-Americanismo" (or Hispanic as it is often referred to in English), which has sought to link the Iberian peninsula to the Spanish-speaking countries in Central and South America through language, commerce, history and culture. Spain has been an effective example of transition from dictatorship to democracy, as shown in the many trips that Spain's King and prime ministers have made to the region.

==== Trends in diplomatic relations ====
Spain maintains economic and technical cooperation programs and cultural exchanges with Latin American countries, both bilaterally and within the EU. During José María Aznar's government, Spanish relations worsened with countries like Mexico, Venezuela and Cuba, but were exceptionally good with others, like Colombia, the Dominican Republic and several Central American republics. José Luis Rodríguez Zapatero's victory in the 2004 general elections changed this setting. Despite long-standing close linguistic, economic and cultural relations with most of Latin America, some aspects of Spanish foreign policy during this time, such as its support for the Iraq War, were not supported or widely favored.

=== Sub-Saharan Africa ===
Spain has gradually begun to broaden its contacts with Sub-Saharan Africa. It has a particular interest in its former colony of Equatorial Guinea, where it maintains a large aid program. More recently, it has sought closer relation with Senegal, Mauritania, Mali and others to find solutions for the issue of illegal immigration to the Canary Islands.

=== Middle East ===
In the Middle East, Spain is known as a broker between powers. In its relations with the Arab world, Spain frequently supports Arab positions on Middle East issues. The Arab countries are a priority interest for Spain because of oil and gas imports and because several Arab nations have substantial investments in Spain.

=== Europe ===
Spain has been successful in managing its relations with its three immediate European neighbours, France, Andorra, and Portugal. The accession of Spain and Portugal to the EU in 1986 has helped ease some of their periodic trade frictions by putting these into an EU context. Franco-Spanish bilateral cooperation has been enhanced by joint action against recurring violence by separatist Basque group ETA since the 1960s. Ties with the United Kingdom are generally good, although the question of Gibraltar remains a sensitive issue, especially since the UK vote on Brexit.

=== Asia ===
Today, Spain is trying to expand its still narrow relations with East Asian nations, with China, Japan and South Korea as its main points of interest in the region. Thailand and Indonesia are Spain's main allies in the ASEAN region, having a considerable number of agreements and a very good relationship. In the recent years Spain has also been boosting its contacts, relations and investment in other Asian countries, most notably Vietnam and Malaysia. Relations with the Philippines are, despite a very long colonial past, considerably weaker than the ones Spain has with other countries in the area, dealing mostly with cultural aspects and humanitarian assistance programs.

== Disputes ==
=== With Great Britain ===
Ever since it was captured in 1704 by Anglo-Dutch forces during the War of the Spanish Succession, Gibraltar has been the subject of a dispute between Britain and Spain. Situated at the southern tip of the Iberian peninsula, overseeing the Strait of Gibraltar which connects the Atlantic Ocean with the Mediterranean Sea, the territory has great strategic importance. Today, Gibraltar is a British Overseas Territory and houses an important base for the British Armed Forces. Then a Spanish town, it was conquered during the War of the Spanish Succession on behalf of Archduke Charles, pretender to the Spanish throne. The legal situation concerning Gibraltar was settled in 1713 by the Treaty of Utrecht, in which Spain ceded the territory in perpetuity to the British Crown stating that, should the British abandon this post, it would be offered to Spain first. Since the 1940s Spain has called for the return of Gibraltar. The overwhelming majority of Gibraltarians strongly oppose this, along with any proposal of shared sovereignty. UN resolutions call on the United Kingdom and Spain to reach an agreement over the status of Gibraltar.

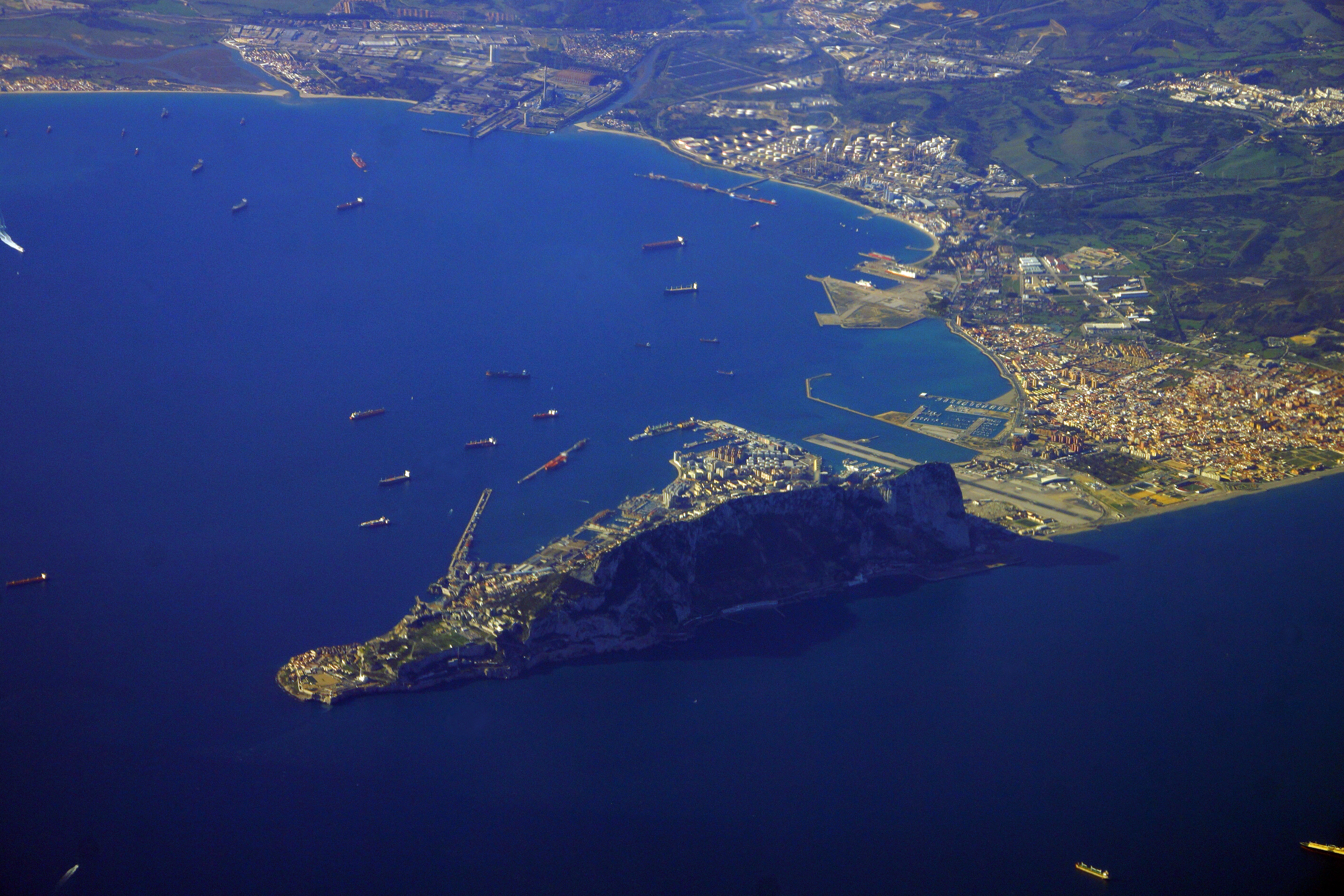
Aerial view showing the Rock of Gibraltar, the isthmus of Gibraltar and the Bay of Gibraltar

The Spanish claim makes a distinction between the isthmus that connects the Rock to the Spanish mainland on the one hand, and the Rock and city of Gibraltar on the other. While the Rock and city were ceded by the Treaty of Utrecht, Spain asserts that the "occupation of the isthmus is illegal and against the principles of International Law". The United Kingdom relies on de facto arguments of possession by prescription in relation to the isthmus, as there has been "continuous possession [of the isthmus] over a long period".

=== With Morocco ===
The strategic position of the Strait of Gibraltar has left a legacy of a number of sovereignty disputes. These include the "five places of sovereignty" (plazas de soberanía) on and off the coast of Morocco: the coastal enclaves of Ceuta and Melilla, which Morocco contests, as well as the islands of Peñon de Alhucemas, Peñon de Vélez de la Gomera, and Islas Chafarinas. Spain maintains sovereignty over Ceuta, Melilla, Peñon de Velez de la Gomera, Alhucemas and the Chafarinas Islands (captured following the Christian reconquest of Spain) based upon historical grounds, security reasons and on the basis of the UN principle of territorial integrity. Spain also maintains that the majority of residents are Spanish. Morocco claims these territories on the basis of the UN principles of decolonisation, territorial integrity and that Spanish arguments for the recovery of Gibraltar substantiate Morocco's claim. Spain claims sovereignty over the Perejil Island, a small, uninhabited rocky islet located in the South shore of the Strait of Gibraltar. The island lies 250 metres (820 ft) just off the coast of Morocco, 8 kilometres (5.0 mi) from Ceuta and 13.5 kilometres (8.4 mi) from mainland Spain. Its sovereignty is disputed between Spain and Morocco. It was the subject of an armed incident between the two countries in 2002. The incident ended when both countries agreed to return to the status quo ante which existed prior to the Moroccan occupation of the island. The islet is now deserted and without any sign of sovereignty.

=== With Portugal ===
Olivenza (Spanish) or Olivença (Portuguese) is a town and seat of a municipality, on a disputed section of the border between Portugal and Spain, which is claimed de jure by both countries and administered de facto as part of the Spanish autonomous community of Extremadura. The population is 80% ethnic Portuguese and 30% of Portuguese language. Olivenza/Olivença was under continuous Portuguese sovereignty since 1297 until it was occupied by the Spanish in 1801 and formally ceded by Portugal later that year by the Treaty of Badajoz. Spain claims the de jure (legal) sovereignty over Olivenza/Olivença on the grounds that the Treaty of Badajoz still stands and has never been revoked. Thus, the border between the two countries in the region of Olivenza/Olivença should be as demarcated by that treaty. Portugal claims the de jure sovereignty over Olivenza/Olivença on the grounds that the Treaty of Badajoz was revoked by its own terms (the breach of any of its articles would lead to its cancellation) when Spain invaded Portugal in the Peninsular War of 1807.

Portugal further bases its case on Article 105 of the Treaty of Vienna of 1815, which Spain signed in 1817, that states that the winning countries are to "endeavour with the mightiest conciliatory effort to return Olivenza/Olivença to Portuguese authority". Thus, the border between the two countries in the region of Olivenza/Olivença should be as demarcated by the Treaty of Alcanizes of 1297. Spain interprets Article 105 as not being mandatory on demanding Spain to return Olivenza/Olivença to Portugal, thus not revoking the Treaty of Badajoz. Portugal has never made a formal claim to the territory after the Treaty of Vienna, but has equally never directly acknowledged the Spanish sovereignty over Olivenza/Olivença. Portugal continues to claim Olivenza/Olivença, asserting that under the Vienna Treaty of 1815, Spain recognized the Portuguese claims as "legitimate".

Another dispute surrounds the Savage Islands, which Spain acknowledges to be part of Portugal. However, Spain claims that they are rocks rather than islands, and therefore Spain does not accept the Portuguese Exclusive Economic Zone (200 nautical miles) generated by the islands, while acknowledging the Selvagens as possessing territorial waters (12 nautical miles). On 5 July 2013, Spain sent a letter to the UN expressing these views.

== Diplomatic relations ==
List of countries which Spain maintains diplomatic relations with:

| # | Country | Date |
|---|---|---|
| 1 | Portugal | 5 October 1143 |
| 2 | France | 1486 |
| 3 | United Kingdom | April 1509 |
| 4 | Denmark | 1 April 1516 |
| — | Holy See | March 1559 |
| 5 | Sweden | 29 June 1578 |
| 6 | Netherlands | 29 June 1649 |
| 7 | United States | 20 February 1783 |
| 8 | Russia | 20 July 1812 |
| 9 | Brazil | 6 June 1834 |
| 10 | Belgium | November 1834 |
| 11 | Greece | 6 December 1835 |
| 12 | Mexico | 28 December 1836 |
| 13 | Ecuador | 16 February 1840 |
| 14 | Iran | 4 March 1842 |
| 15 | Chile | 25 April 1844 |
| 16 | Venezuela | 30 March 1845 |
| 17 | Bolivia | 21 July 1847 |
| 18 | Costa Rica | 10 May 1850 |
| 19 | Nicaragua | 21 March 1851 |
| 20 | Dominican Republic | 18 February 1855 |
| 21 | Italy | 5 May 1856 |
| 22 | Argentina | 9 July 1859 |
| 23 | Guatemala | 18 June 1864 |
| 24 | El Salvador | 24 June 1865 |
| 25 | Japan | 12 November 1868 |
| 26 | Thailand | 23 February 1870 |
| 27 | Uruguay | 19 July 1870 |
| 28 | Monaco | 2 June 1876 |
| 29 | Peru | 15 November 1879 |
| 30 | Paraguay | 10 September 1880 |
| 31 | Colombia | 30 January 1881 |
| 32 | Romania | 5 July 1881 |
| 33 | Luxembourg | 9 February 1891 |
| 34 | Honduras | 11 June 1896 |
| 35 | Cuba | 21 June 1902 |
| 36 | Panama | 10 May 1904 |
| 37 | Norway | 26 November 1905 |
| 38 | Bulgaria | 5 August 1910 |
| 39 | Serbia | 14 October 1916 |
| 40 | Finland | 16 August 1918 |
| 41 | Czech Republic | 19 June 1919 |
| 42 | Poland | 17 September 1919 |
| 43 | Egypt | 9 May 1922 |
| 44 | Hungary | 12 July 1924 |
| 45 | Turkey | 27 September 1924 |
| 46 | Austria | 14 June 1925 |
| 47 | Ireland | 23 June 1935 |
| — | Sovereign Military Order of Malta | 19 November 1938 |
| 48 | Switzerland | 14 February 1939 |
| 49 | Philippines | 27 September 1947 |
| 50 | Syria | 3 April 1948 |
| 51 | Lebanon | 15 April 1949 |
| 52 | Iceland | 20 September 1949 |
| 53 | Haiti | 6 November 1949 |
| 54 | South Korea | 24 March 1950 |
| 55 | Liberia | 5 May 1950 |
| 56 | Jordan | 6 July 1950 |
| 57 | Iraq | 5 August 1950 |
| 58 | Ethiopia | 27 April 1951 |
| 59 | South Africa | 18 May 1951 |
| 60 | Pakistan | 17 September 1951 |
| 61 | Saudi Arabia | 17 July 1952 |
| 62 | Germany | 6 November 1952 |
| 63 | Canada | 21 February 1953 |
| 64 | Sri Lanka | 10 July 1955 |
| 65 | Morocco | 26 June 1956 |
| 66 | India | 7 November 1956 |
| 67 | Tunisia | 8 July 1957 |
| 68 | Indonesia | 28 February 1958 |
| 69 | Afghanistan | 28 October 1958 |
| 70 | Libya | 14 January 1961 |
| 71 | Nigeria | 10 February 1961 |
| 72 | Mauritania | 15 April 1961 |
| 73 | Cameroon | 10 November 1961 |
| 74 | Algeria | 18 December 1962 |
| 75 | Sudan | 20 February 1964 |
| 76 | Gabon | 25 February 1964 |
| 77 | Sierra Leone | 6 March 1964 |
| 78 | Laos | 20 March 1964 |
| 79 | Kuwait | 17 April 1964 |
| 80 | Ivory Coast | 12 June 1964 |
| 81 | Mali | 20 August 1964 |
| 82 | Democratic Republic of the Congo | 3 November 1964 |
| 83 | Burkina Faso | 27 November 1964 |
| 84 | Central African Republic | 27 November 1964 |
| 85 | Guinea | 10 February 1965 |
| 86 | Senegal | 3 March 1965 |
| 87 | Niger | May 1965 |
| 88 | Gambia | 14 August 1965 |
| 89 | Togo | 22 October 1965 |
| 90 | Benin | 25 March 1966 |
| 91 | Madagascar | 25 March 1966 |
| 92 | Burundi | 27 September 1966 |
| 93 | Jamaica | 21 December 1966 |
| 94 | Tanzania | 23 February 1967 |
| 95 | Myanmar | 11 March 1967 |
| 96 | Kenya | 27 April 1967 |
| 97 | Malaysia | 12 May 1967 |
| 98 | Trinidad and Tobago | 15 June 1967 |
| 99 | Rwanda | 16 June 1967 |
| 100 | Australia | 26 October 1967 |
| 101 | Ghana | 10 November 1967 |
| 102 | Cyprus | 22 December 1967 |
| 103 | Singapore | 26 April 1968 |
| 104 | Nepal | 14 May 1968 |
| 105 | Somalia | 31 May 1968 |
| 106 | Malta | 7 June 1968 |
| 107 | Yemen | 24 September 1968 |
| 108 | Equatorial Guinea | 12 October 1968 |
| 109 | New Zealand | 28 March 1969 |
| 110 | Uganda | 13 September 1969 |
| 111 | Zambia | 26 September 1969 |
| 112 | Bahrain | 15 November 1971 |
| 113 | Bangladesh | 12 May 1972 |
| 114 | Malawi | 27 October 1972 |
| 115 | Oman | 10 November 1972 |
| 116 | United Arab Emirates | 10 November 1972 |
| 117 | Republic of the Congo | 7 December 1972 |
| 118 | Qatar | 22 December 1972 |
| 119 | China | 9 March 1973 |
| 120 | Chad | 7 February 1975 |
| 121 | Guinea Bissau | 3 March 1975 |
| 122 | Lesotho | 3 May 1976 |
| 123 | Suriname | 9 July 1976 |
| 124 | Grenada | 2 September 1976 |
| 125 | Bahamas | 1 December 1976 |
| 126 | Fiji | 10 December 1976 |
| 127 | Cambodia | 3 May 1977 |
| 128 | Vietnam | 23 May 1977 |
| 129 | Mozambique | 27 May 1977 |
| 130 | Mongolia | 4 July 1977 |
| 131 | Angola | 19 October 1977 |
| 132 | Cape Verde | 21 December 1977 |
| 133 | Papua New Guinea | 28 August 1978 |
| 134 | Seychelles | 3 November 1978 |
| 135 | Eswatini | 6 April 1979 |
| 136 | Mauritius | 30 May 1979 |
| 137 | Djibouti | 25 June 1979 |
| 138 | Maldives | 24 August 1979 |
| 139 | Guyana | 12 October 1979 |
| 140 | Tonga | 16 November 1979 |
| 141 | Zimbabwe | 21 April 1980 |
| 142 | Solomon Islands | 8 August 1980 |
| 143 | Barbados | 29 September 1980 |
| 144 | Dominica | 29 September 1980 |
| 145 | Samoa | 5 November 1980 |
| 146 | Botswana | 29 April 1981 |
| 147 | Vanuatu | 30 April 1981 |
| 148 | São Tomé and Príncipe | 26 February 1982 |
| 149 | Comoros | 1 March 1983 |
| 150 | Brunei | June 1984 |
| 151 | Israel | 17 January 1986 |
| 152 | Saint Lucia | 2 May 1986 |
| 153 | Saint Vincent and the Grenadines | 21 July 1986 |
| 154 | Albania | 12 September 1986 |
| 155 | Saint Kitts and Nevis | 19 March 1987 |
| 156 | Antigua and Barbuda | 27 June 1988 |
| 157 | Belize | 13 January 1989 |
| 158 | Namibia | 21 March 1990 |
| 159 | Estonia | 10 September 1991 |
| 160 | Lithuania | 7 October 1991 |
| 161 | Latvia | 9 October 1991 |
| 162 | Marshall Islands | 17 December 1991 |
| 163 | Liechtenstein | 9 January 1992 |
| 164 | Armenia | 27 January 1992 |
| 165 | Ukraine | 30 January 1992 |
| 166 | Moldova | 31 January 1992 |
| 167 | Azerbaijan | 11 February 1992 |
| 168 | Kazakhstan | 11 February 1992 |
| 169 | Belarus | 13 February 1992 |
| 170 | Croatia | 9 March 1992 |
| 171 | Uzbekistan | 18 March 1992 |
| 172 | Turkmenistan | 19 March 1992 |
| 173 | Slovenia | 25 March 1992 |
| 174 | Kyrgyzstan | 3 April 1992 |
| 175 | San Marino | 29 April 1992 |
| 176 | Federated States of Micronesia | 11 May 1992 |
| 177 | Georgia | 9 July 1992 |
| 178 | Tajikistan | 4 August 1992 |
| 179 | Bosnia and Herzegovina | 14 December 1992 |
| 180 | Slovakia | 1 January 1993 |
| 181 | Andorra | 3 June 1993 |
| 182 | Eritrea | 5 October 1993 |
| 183 | North Macedonia | 28 July 1994 |
| 184 | Tuvalu | 4 May 1995 |
| 185 | Palau | 3 August 1995 |
| 186 | Nauru | 27 September 1995 |
| — | Cook Islands | 29 January 1998 |
| 187 | North Korea | 7 February 2001 |
| 188 | Timor-Leste | 20 May 2002 |
| 189 | Montenegro | 11 December 2006 |
| 190 | Bhutan | 11 February 2011 |
| 191 | Kiribati | 24 September 2011 |
| 192 | South Sudan | 7 October 2011 |
| — | State of Palestine | 16 September 2024 |

== Bilateral relations ==
=== Africa ===
| Country | Date formal relations began | Notes |
|---|---|---|
| Algeria | 18 December 1962 | See Algeria–Spain relations: Algeria has an embassy in Madrid and consulates-general in Alicante and Barcelona.; Spain has an embassy in Algiers and a consulate-general in Oran. |
| Angola | 19 October 1977 | See Angola–Spain relations: Angola has an embassy in Madrid.; Spain has an embassy in Luanda. |
| Burkina Faso | 27 November 1964 | See Burkina Faso–Spain relations |
| Cameroon | 10 November 1961 | See Cameroon–Spain relations: Cameroon has an embassy in Madrid.; Spain has an embassy in Yaoundé. |
| Chad | 7 February 1975 | Chad is accredited to Spain from its embassy in Paris, France.; Spain is accredited to Chad from its embassy in Yaoundé, Cameroon. |
| Ivory Coast | 12 June 1964 | See Ivory Coast–Spain relations: Ivory Coast has an embassy in Madrid.; Spain has an embassy in Abidjan. |
| Democratic Republic of the Congo | 3 November 1964 | See Democratic Republic of the Congo–Spain relations: DR Congo has an embassy in Madrid.; Spain has an embassy in Kinshasa. |
| Egypt | 15 July 1950 | See Egypt–Spain relations: Egypt has an embassy in Madrid.; Spain has an embassy in Cairo. |
| Equatorial Guinea | 27 September 1968 | See Equatorial Guinea–Spain relations: Equatorial Guinea has an embassy in Madrid and a consulate in Las Palmas.; Spain has an embassy in Malabo and a consulate-general in Bata.; See also: Spanish Equatoguineans |
| Ethiopia | April 1951 | See Ethiopia–Spain relations: Ethiopia is accredited to Spain from its embassy in Paris, France.; Spain has an embassy in Addis Ababa. |
| Gambia | 14 August 1965 | Gambia has an embassy in Madrid.; Spain has an embassy office in Banjul. |
| Gabon | 25 February 1964 | See Gabon–Spain relations: Gabon has an embassy in Madrid.; Spain has an embassy in Libreville. |
| Ghana | 10 November 1967 | See Ghana–Spain relations: Ghana has an embassy in Madrid.; Spain has an embassy in Accra. |
| Guinea | 10 February 1965 | See Guinea–Spain relations: Guinea has an embassy in Madrid.; Spain has an embassy in Conakry. |
| Guinea-Bissau | 1974 | See Guinea-Bissau–Spain relations: Guinea-Bissau has an embassy in Madrid.; Spain has an embassy in Bissau. |
| Kenya | 27 April 1967 | See Kenya–Spain relations: Kenya has an embassy in Madrid.; Spain has an embassy in Nairobi. |
| Liberia | 5 May 1950 | See Liberia–Spain relations |
| Libya | 14 January 1961 | See Libya–Spain relations: Libya has an embassy in Madrid.; Spain has an embassy in Tripoli. |
| Madagascar | 25 March 1966 | Madagascar is accredited to Spain from its embassy in Paris, France.; Spain is accredited to Madagascar from its embassy in Pretoria, South Africa. |
| Mali | 20 August 1964 | See Mali–Spain relations: Mali has an embassy in Madrid.; Spain has an embassy in Bamako. |
| Mauritania | 15 April 1961 | See Mauritania–Spain relations: Mauritania has an embassy in Madrid and a consulate-general in Las Palmas.; Spain has an embassy in Nouakchott and a consulate-general in Nouadhibou. |
| Morocco | 26 June 1956 | See Morocco–Spain relations Spain has several interests in Morocco. This is dictated by geographic proximity and long historical contacts, as well as by the two Spanish enclave cities of Ceuta and Melilla on the northern coast of Africa. While Spain's departure from its former colony of Western Sahara ended direct Spanish participation in Morocco, it maintains an interest in the peaceful resolution of the conflict brought about there by decolonization. These issues were highlighted by a crisis in 2002, when Spanish forces evicted a small contingent of Moroccans from a tiny islet off Morocco's coast following that nation's attempt to assert sovereignty over the Spanish island.: Morocco has an embassy in Madrid and consulates-general in Algeciras, Almería, Barcelona, Bilbao, Las Palmas, Seville, Tarragona and Valencia.; Spain has an embassy in Rabat and consulates-general in Agadir, Casablanca, Nador, Tanger and Tetuan and a consulate in Larache.; See also: Moroccans in Spain |
| Mozambique | 27 May 1977 | See Mozambique–Spain relations: Mozambique has an embassy in Madrid.; Spain has an embassy in Maputo. |
| Namibia | 2 March 1990 | See Namibia–Spain relations: Namibia is accredited to Spain from its embassy in Paris, France.; Spain has an embassy in Windhoek. |
| Niger | May 1965 | See Niger–Spain relations: Niger is accredited to Spain from its embassy in Paris, France.; Spain has an embassy in Niamey. |
| Nigeria | 10 February 1961 | See Nigeria–Spain relations: Nigeria has an embassy in Madrid.; Spain has an embassy in Abuja and a consulate-general in Lagos. |
| Sahrawi Arab Democratic Republic | No diplomatic relations | See Sahrawi Arab Democratic Republic–Spain relations: Sahrawi Arab Democratic Republic has a delegation office in Madrid and a delegation office in Barcelona. |
| Senegal | 3 March 1965 | See Senegal–Spain relations: Senegal has an embassy in Madrid.; Spain has an embassy in Dakar. |
| South Africa | 18 May 1951 | See South Africa–Spain relations: South Africa has an embassy in Madrid.; Spain has an embassy in Pretoria and a consulate-general in Cape Town. |
| Sudan | 20 February 1964 | See Spain–Sudan relations: Spain has an embassy in Khartoum.; Sudan has an embassy in Madrid. |
| Tanzania | 23 February 1967 | Spain has an embassy in Dar es Salaam.; Tanzania is accredited to Spain from its embassy in Paris, France. |
| Tunisia | 8 July 1957 | See Spain–Tunisia relations: Spain has an embassy in Tunis.; Tunisia has an embassy in Madrid. |
| Zambia | 26 September 1969 | Spain has no embassy in Zambia, but has an honorary consulate in Lusaka, and is accredited to the country from its embassy in Paris, France.; Zambia is accredited to Spain from its embassy in Harare, Zimbabwe. |
| Zimbabwe | 21 April 1981 | Spain has an embassy in Harare.; Zimbabwe is accredited to Spain from its embassy in Paris, France. |

=== Americas ===
| Country | Date formal relations began | Notes |
|---|---|---|
| Antigua and Barbuda | 27 June 1988 | Antigua and Barbuda has an embassy in Madrid.; Spain is accredited to Antigua and Barbuda from its embassy in Kingston, Jamaica. |
| Argentina | 21 September 1863 | See Argentina–Spain relations: Argentina has an embassy in Madrid and consulates-general in Barcelona and Vigo and consulates in Cádiz, Palma de Mallorca and Santa Cruz de Tenerife.; Spain has an embassy in Buenos Aires and consulates-general in Bahía Blanca, Córdoba, Mendoza and in Rosario.; Spanish Ministry of Foreign Affairs on bilateral and trade relations between Spain and Argentina (in Spanish); See also: Spanish Argentine and Argentines in Spain. |
| Bahamas | 1 December 1976 | See Bahamas–Spain relations |
| Barbados | 29 September 1980 | Barbados is accredited to Spain from its embassy in Brussels, Belgium.; Spain is accredited to Barbados from its embassy in Port of Spain, Trinidad and Tobago. |
| Belize | 13 January 1989 | See Belize–Spain relations: Belize is accredited to Spain from its embassy in Brussels, Belgium.; Spain is accredited to Belize from its embassy in Guatemala City, Guatemala. |
| Bolivia | 21 July 1847 | See Bolivia–Spain relations A diplomatic crisis with Bolivia in 2005 due to a misunderstanding was quickly resolved by Zapatero and Spain became the first European country visited by Evo Morales on January 4, 2006. However, there remain problems surrounding the exploitation of oil and gas fields in the country by Spanish corporations like Repsol. Bolivian President Evo Morales met King Juan Carlos and held talks with Prime Minister Jose Luis Rodriguez Zapatero during a visit to Spain in September 2009 with the intention of resolving issues concerning the nationalisation of the Bolivian energy sector. The move has the potential to hurt some Spanish companies however relations were said to be "positive" between the Bolivian state and Spanish private sector energy companies. Evo Morales said that Bolivia is ready to accept outside investment in its energy and natural resource industries as long as foreign firms do not act as owners and that Bolivia is "looking for investment, be it from private or state sector. We want partners, not owners of our natural resources." It was suggested that Bolivia would also negotiate with Spanish companies to produce car parts and lithium batteries in the future.: Bolivia has an embassy in Madrid and a consulate-general in Barcelona and consulates in Bilbao, Murcia, Seville and Valencia and vice-consulates in Granada and Palma.; Spain has an embassy in La Paz and a consulate-general in Santa Cruz de la Sierra. |
| Brazil | | See Brazil–Spain relations: Brazil has an embassy in Madrid and a consulate-general in Barcelona.; Spain has an embassy in Brasília and consulates-general in Porto Alegre, Rio de Janeiro, Salvador and São Paulo.; See also: Brazilians of Spanish descent and Spanish immigration to Brazil. |
| Canada | 21 February 1953 | See Canada–Spain relations: Canada has an embassy in Madrid and consulates in Barcelona and Málaga.; Spain has an embassy in Ottawa and consulates-general in Montreal and Toronto.; See also: Spanish Canadian |
| Chile | 12 June 1883 | See Chile–Spain relations: Chile has an embassy in Madrid and a consulate-general in Barcelona.; Spain has an embassy in Santiago.; Both nations are members of the Organisation for Economic Co-operation and Development.: See also: Spanish Chilean |
| Colombia | 30 January 1881 | See Colombia–Spain relations: Colombia has an embassy in Madrid and consulates-general in Barcelona and Seville and consulates in Bilbao, Las Palmas de Gran Canaria, Palma de Mallorca and Valencia.; Spain has an embassy in Bogotá.; See also: Colombians in Spain and Spanish Colombian. |
| Costa Rica | 10 May 1850 | See Costa Rica–Spain relations: Costa Rica has an embassy in Madrid.; Spain has an embassy in San José.; See also: Spanish Costa Rican |
| Cuba | 1902 | See Cuba–Spain relations: Cuba has an embassy in Madrid and consulates-general in Barcelona, Las Palmas, Santiago de Compostela and Seville.; Spain has an embassy and consulate-general in Havana and a consulate-general in Camagüey.; See also: Spanish immigration to Cuba |
| Dominican Republic | 18 February 1855 | See Dominican Republic–Spain relations: Dominican Republic has an embassy in Madrid and consulates-general in Barcelona and Santa Cruz de Tenerife and consulates in Seville and Valencia.; Spain has an embassy in Santo Domingo. |
| Ecuador | 16 February 1840 | See Ecuador–Spain relations: Ecuador has an embassy in Madrid and consulates-general in Alicante, Barcelona, Málaga, Murcia, Palma de Mallorca and Valencia.; Spain has an embassy in Quito and a consulate-general in Guayaquil.; Both countries are members of the Organization of Ibero-American States.; See also: Ecuadorians in Spain |
| El Salvador | 24 June 1865 | See El Salvador–Spain relations: El Salvador has an embassy in Madrid and consulates-general in Barcelona and Seville.; Spain has an embassy in San Salvador. |
| Guatemala | 18 June 1864 | See Guatemala–Spain relations: Guatemala has an embassy in Madrid.; Spain has an embassy in Guatemala City.; See also: Spaniards in Guatemala |
| Haiti | 6 November 1949 | See Haiti–Spain relations: Haiti has an embassy in Madrid.; Spain has an embassy in Port-au-Prince. |
| Honduras | 11 June 1896 | See Honduras–Spain relations: Honduras has an embassy in Madrid and consulates-general in Barcelona, Bilbao and Valencia and a vice consulate in Girona.; Spain has an embassy in Tegucigalpa. |
| Jamaica | 21 December 1966 | See Jamaica–Spain relations: Jamaica is accredited to Spain from its embassy in Brussels, Belgium.; Spain has an embassy in Kingston. |
| Mexico | 28 December 1836 | See Mexico–Spain relations: Mexico has an embassy in Madrid and a consulate in Barcelona.; Spain has an embassy and a consulate-general in Mexico City and consulates-general in Guadalajara and in Monterrey.; Both countries are members of the Organization of Ibero-American States and the Organisation for Economic Co-operation and Development.; During the Spanish Civil War, Mexican volunteers joined the Republican side to fight Francisco Franco. Though the Republicans had lost the war, this helped improve the relationship between the two countries. Also, many Spanish immigrants immigrated to Mexico to escape the Spanish Civil War.; Mexican Ministry of Foreign Affairs on bilateral relations between Mexico and Spain (in Spanish); Spanish Ministry of Foreign Affairs on bilateral and trade relations between Spain and Mexico (in Spanish); See also: Spanish immigration to Mexico and Mexicans in Spain. |
| Nicaragua | 21 March 1851 | See Nicaragua–Spain relations: Nicaragua has an embassy in Madrid.; Spain has an embassy in Managua. |
| Panama | 10 May 1904 | See Panama–Spain relations: Panama has an embassy in Madrid and consulates-general in A Coruña, Barcelona, Las Palmas and Valencia.; Spain has an embassy in Panama City. |
| Paraguay | 10 September 1880 | See Paraguay–Spain relations: Paraguay has an embassy in Madrid and a consulate-general in Barcelona and a consulate in Málaga.; Spain has an embassy in Asunción.; Both countries are full members of the Latin Union, of the Association of Spanish Language Academies, and of the Organization of Ibero-American States.; Spanish Ministry of Foreign about the relation with Paraguay (in Spanish); See also: Paraguayans in Spain |
| Peru | 15 November 1879 | See Peru–Spain relations: Peru has an embassy in Madrid and consulates-general in Barcelona, Bilbao, Seville and Valencia.; Spain has an embassy in Lima.; Both countries are full members of the Association of Spanish Language Academies and the Organization of Ibero-American States; See also: Spanish Peruvian and Peruvians to Spain. |
| Trinidad and Tobago | 15 June 1967 | See Spain–Trinidad and Tobago relations: Spain has an embassy in Port of Spain.; Trinidad and Tobago is accredited to Spain from its embassy in Brussels, Belgium. |
| United States | 20 February 1783 | See Spain–United States relations Under the government of José María Aznar, Spain developed exceptionally good relations with the US, in great part due to the personal empathy between Aznar and George W. Bush. Following Zapatero's decision to withdraw Spanish troops from Iraq immediately after the 2004 general elections, relations predictably soured, although important commercial links remained intact. When elected, President Barack Obama expressed his wish to enhance cooperation between both countries, especially in policies like the Green Energy plan from Zapatero, introducing the AVE (the Spanish High Speed Train) in United States and aiding US by receiving in Spanish prisons Guantanamo Prison detainees: Spain has an embassy in Washington, D.C. and consulates-general in Boston, Chicago, Houston, Los Angeles, Miami, New York, San Francisco and in San Juan.; United States has an embassy in Madrid and a consulate-general in Barcelona and also mission in Las Palmas, Canary Islands.; See also: Spanish American |
| Uruguay | 9 October 1841 | See Spain–Uruguay relations: Uruguay has an embassy in Madrid and consulates-general in Barcelona, Las Palmas de Gran Canaria, Santiago de Compostela, and Valencia.; Spain has an embassy in Montevideo.; Both countries are full members of the Latin Union, of the Association of Spanish Language Academies, and of the Organization of Ibero-American States.; Spanish Ministry of Foreign on bilateral relations with Uruguay (in Spanish); See also: Spanish Uruguayan and Uruguayans in Spain. |
| Venezuela | 30 March 1845 | See Spain–Venezuela relations: Venezuela has an embassy in Madrid and consulates-general in Barcelona, Bilbao,Santa Cruz de Tenerife, and Vigo.; Spain has an embassy in Caracas.; See also: Spanish Venezuelan and Venezuelans in Spain. |

=== Asia ===
| Country | Date formal relations began | Notes |
|---|---|---|
| Afghanistan | 28 October 1958 | See Afghanistan–Spain relations: Afghanistan has an embassy in Madrid.; Spain closed its embassy in Kabul in August 2021. |
| Armenia | 27 January 1992 | See Armenia–Spain relations: Armenia has an embassy in Madrid.; Spain is accredited to Armenia from its embassy in Moscow, Russia and maintains an honorary consulate in Yerevan.; There are around 42,000 people of Armenian descent living in Spain, especially in Valencia and Barcelona.; See also: Armenians in Spain; Spanish Ministry of Foreign Affairs and Cooperations about the relation with Armenia (in Spanish only) |
| Azerbaijan | 11 February 1992 | See Azerbaijan–Spain relations: Azerbaijan has an embassy in Madrid.; Spain has an embassy office in Baku. |
| Bahrain | 15 November 1971 | |
| Bangladesh | 12 May 1972 | See Bangladesh–Spain relations: Bangladesh has an embassy in Madrid.; Spain has an embassy in Dhaka. |
| Bhutan | 11 February 2011 | See Bhutan–Spain relations |
| China | 9 March 1973 | See China–Spain relations: China has an embassy in Madrid, and a consulate-general in Barcelona.; Spain has an embassy in Beijing and consulates-general in Guangzhou, Hong Kong, and Shanghai. |
| Georgia | 9 July 1992 | See Georgia–Spain relations: Georgia has an embassy in Madrid.; Spain is accredited to Georgia from its embassy in Ankara, Turkey.; Both countries are full members of the Council of Europe.; Georgia is an EU candidate and Spain is an EU member. |
| India | 7 November 1956 | See India–Spain relations: India has an embassy in Madrid and two honorary consulate generals in Barcelona and Las Palmas.; Spain has an embassy in New Delhi and a consulate-general in Mumbai. |
| Indonesia | February 1958 | See Indonesia–Spain relations: Indonesia has an embassy in Madrid.; Spain has an embassy in Jakarta. |
| Iran | 4 March 1842 | See Iran–Spain relations: Iran has an embassy in Madrid.; Spain has an embassy in Tehran. |
| Iraq | 5 August 1950 | See Iraq–Spain relations: Iraq has an embassy in Madrid.; Spain has an embassy in Baghdad. |
| Israel | 17 January 1986 | See Israel–Spain relations: Israel has an embassy in Madrid.; Spain has an embassy in Tel Aviv and a consulate-general in Jerusalem.; Both countries are full members of the Union for the Mediterranean.; Spanish Ministry of Foreign Affairs about relations with Israel (in Spanish) |
| Japan | 12 November 1868 | See Japan–Spain relations: Japan has an embassy in Madrid, a consulate-general in Barcelona and a consulate in Las Palmas.; Spain has an embassy in Tokyo. |
| Jordan | 6 July 1950 | See Jordan–Spain relations: Jordan has an embassy in Madrid.; Spain has an embassy in Amman. |
| Kazakhstan | 11 February 1992 | See Kazakhstan–Spain relations: Kazakhstan has an embassy in Madrid.; Spain has an embassy in Astana. |
| Kuwait | 17 April 1964 | See Kuwait–Spain relations: Kuwait has an embassy in Madrid.; Spain has an embassy in Kuwait City. |
| Kyrgyzstan | 3 April 1992 | Spain is accredited to Kyrgyzstan from its embassy in Astana, Kazakhstan.; Kyrgyzstan does not have an accreditation to Spain. |
| Lebanon | 15 April 1949 | See Lebanon–Spain relations: Lebanon has an embassy in Madrid.; Spain has an embassy in Beirut. |
| Malaysia | 12 May 1967 | See Malaysia–Spain relations: Malaysia has an embassy in Madrid.; Spain has an embassy in Kuala Lumpur. |
| Mongolia | 4 July 1977 | Mongolia is accredited to Spain from its embassy in Paris, France.; Spain is accredited to Mongolia from its embassy in Beijing, China. |
| North Korea | 7 February 2001 | See North Korea–Spain relations: North Korea closed its embassy in Madrid in November 2023.; Spain is accredited to North Korea from its embassy in Beijing, China. |
| Pakistan | 17 September 1951 | See Pakistan–Spain relations Pakistan and Spain enjoy extremely cordial and friendly ties. Relations were established in the late 1950s. Pakistanis form the largest Asian immigrant community in Spain.: Pakistan has an embassy in Madrid and a consulate-general in Barcelona.; Spain has an embassy in Islamabad and honorary consulates in Karachi and Lahore. |
| Philippines | 27 September 1947 | See Philippines–Spain relations Philippine President Gloria Macapagal Arroyo concluded her second state visit in Spain in July 2006, bringing back millions of dollars of Spanish investments, particularly in Tourism and Information Technology. The Spanish king, Juan Carlos I, also reiterated in Mrs. Arroyo's visit, his support for her project in the Philippines to re-establish Spanish as an official language in the country. He and his wife, Queen Sofia attended the 1998 centennial celebrations in Manila, commemorating 100 years of independence from Spain. The mediation of King Juan Carlos I is said to have produced the pardon and liberation of two Filipina domestic workers sentenced to death in Kuwait and the UAE.: Philippines has an embassy in Madrid.; Spain has an embassy in Manila. |
| Qatar | 22 December 1972 | See Qatar–Spain relations: Qatar has an embassy in Madrid.; Spain has an embassy in Doha. |
| Saudi Arabia | 17 July 1952 | See Saudi Arabia–Spain relations: Saudi Arabia has an embassy in Madrid and a consulate-general in Málaga.; Spain has an embassy in Riyadh. |
| South Korea | 24 March 1950 | See South Korea–Spain relations The establishment of diplomatic relations between the Republic of Korea and the Kingdom of Spain began on 7 March 1950.: With the normalization of diplomatic relations with the Republic of South Korea on 7 March 1950 Spain completed the process of universalizing its diplomatic relations.; First Vice Minister of Foreign Affairs Cho Tae-yong met with his Spanish counterpart Secretary of State for Foreign Affairs Ignacio Ybáñez Rubio in Madrid on June 1 for the tenth Republic of Korea-Spain high-level policy consultation. In the meeting, the two sides discussed ways to step up bilateral cooperation.; Both countries signed a working holiday visa program agreement in 2017-12-18.; South Korea has an embassy in Madrid.; Spain has an embassy in Seoul.; Spanish Ministry of Foreign Affairs about relations with South Korea (in Spanish only); South Korean Ministry of Foreign Affairs and Trade about relations with Spain (in Korean only) |
| Taiwan | No diplomatic relations | See Spain–Taiwan relations: Spain has a Chamber of Commerce in Taipei.; Taiwan has a Taipei Economic and Cultural Office in Madrid. |
| Tajikistan | 4 August 1992 | Spain is accredited to Tajikistan from its embassy in Astana, Kazakhstan.; Tajikistan is accredited to Spain from its embassy in Geneva, Switzerland. |
| Thailand | 23 February 1870 | See Spain–Thailand relations: Spain has an embassy in Bangkok.; Thailand has an embassy in Madrid. |
| Timor-Leste | 20 May 2002 | Timor-Leste is accredited to Spain from its embassy in Lisbon, Portugal.; Spain is accredited to Timor-Leste from its embassy in Jakarta, Indonesia. |
| Turkey | 27 September 1924 | See Spain–Turkey relations: Spain has an embassy in Ankara and a consulate-general in Istanbul.; Turkey has an embassy in Madrid and a consulate-general in Barcelona.; Both countries are full members of the Council of Europe, of NATO and the Union for the Mediterranean.; Spain is an EU member and Turkey is an EU candidate. Spain supports Turkey's accession negotiations to the EU, although negotiations have now been suspended.; Turkish Ministry of Foreign Affairs about relations with Spain; See also: Turks in Spain |
| United Arab Emirates | 10 November 1972 | See Spain–United Arab Emirates relations: Spain has an embassy in Abu Dhabi.; United Arab Emirates has an embassy in Madrid. |
| Uzbekistan | 18 March 1992 | See Spain–Uzbekistan relations: Spain is accredited to Uzbekistan from its embassy in Moscow, Russia.; Uzbekistan has an embassy in Madrid. |
| Vietnam | 23 May 1977 | See Spain–Vietnam relations: Spain has an embassy in Hanoi.; Vietnam has an embassy in Madrid. |
| Yemen | 24 September 1968 | See Spain–Yemen relations |

=== Europe ===
| Country | Date formal relations began | Notes |
|---|---|---|
| Albania | 12 September 1986 | See Albania–Spain relations: Albania has an embassy in Madrid.; Spain has an embassy in Tirana.; Both countries are full members of the NATO.; Albania is an EU candidate and Spain is an EU member. |
| Andorra | 3 June 1993 | See Andorra–Spain relations: Andorra has an embassy in Madrid.; Spain has an embassy in Andorra la Vella |
| Austria | 28 March 1956 | See Austria–Spain relations: Austria has an embassy in Madrid.; Spain has an embassy in Vienna.; Both countries are full members of the European Union and of the Council of Europe. |
| Belarus | 13 February 1992 | See Belarus–Spain relations: Belarus has an embassy in Madrid.; Spain is accredited to Belarus from its embassy in Moscow, Russia.; Both countries are full members of the Organization for Security and Co-operation in Europe.; Spanish Ministry of Foreign Affairs and Cooperation about relations with Belarus (in Spanish only); Spanish Ministry of Foreign Affairs and Cooperation: Spanish representations in Belarus |
| Belgium | 21 January 1921 | See Belgium–Spain relations: Belgium has an embassy in Madrid.; Spain has an embassy in Brussels.; Both countries are full members of the European Union and of the NATO. |
| Bosnia and Herzegovina | 14 December 1992 | See Bosnia and Herzegovina–Spain relations: Bosnia and Herzegovina has an embassy in Madrid.; Spain has an embassy in Sarajevo.; Bosnia and Herzegovina is an EU candidate and Spain is an EU member. |
| Bulgaria | 5 August 1910 | See also Bulgaria–Spain relations: Relations were severed in 1946 and were restored in 1970 at the level of consular office and trade mission.; Since January 27, 1970, the diplomatic relations were elevated to embassy-level.; Bulgaria has an embassy in Madrid and an honorary consulate in Barcelona.; Spain has an embassy in Sofia.; Both countries are full members of the European Union and of the NATO.; Spanish Ministry of Foreign Affairs about relations with Bulgaria (in Spanish) |
| Croatia | 9 March 1992 | See Croatia–Spain relations: Croatia has an embassy in Madrid.; Spain has an embassy in Zagreb; Croatian Ministry of Foreign Affairs and European Integration: list of bilateral treaties with Spain; Spanish Ministry of Foreign Affairs about relations with Croatia (in Spanish only); Both countries are full members of the European Union and of the NATO. |
| Cyprus | 22 December 1967 | See Cyprus–Spain relations: Cyprus has an embassy in Madrid.; Spain has an embassy in Nicosia.; Both countries are full members of the European Union, the Council of Europe and of the Union for the Mediterranean. |
| Czech Republic | 19 June 1919 | See Czech Republic–Spain relations: Czech Republic has an embassy in Madrid.; Spain has an embassy in Prague.; Both countries are full members of the European Union and of the NATO. |
| Denmark | 1 April 1516 | See Denmark–Spain relations: Denmark has an embassy in Madrid.; Spain has an embassy in Copenhagen.; Both countries are full members of the European Union and of the NATO. |
| Estonia | 10 September 1991 | See Estonia–Spain relations: Estonia has an embassy in Madrid.; Spain has an embassy in Tallinn.; Both countries are full members of the European Union and of the NATO. |
| Finland | 16 August 1918 | See Finland–Spain relations: Finland has an embassy in Madrid.; Spain has an embassy in Helsinki.; Both countries are full members of the European Union and of the NATO.; Spain fully supported Finland's application to join NATO, which resulted in membership on 4 April 2023. |
| France | 1486 | See France–Spain relations: France has an embassy in Madrid and consulates-general in Barcelona, Bilbao and Seville.; Spain has an embassy in Paris and consulates-general in Bayonne, Bordeaux, Lyon, Montpellier, Marseille, Pau, Perpignan, Strasbourg and Toulouse.; See also: Spaniards in France; Both countries are full members of the European Union and of the NATO. |
| Germany | 6 November 1952 | See Germany–Spain relations: Germany has an embassy in Madrid and consulates-general in Barcelona and Seville.; Spain has an embassy in Berlin and consulates-general in Düsseldorf, Frankfurt, Hamburg, Hanover, Munich and Stuttgart.; See also: Spaniards in Germany; Both countries are full members of the European Union and of the NATO. |
| Greece | 6 December 1835 | See Greece–Spain relations Both countries maintain enhanced cooperation on the serious problem of illegal migration, which they have in common. The need for effective confrontation of the illegal migration pressures on both states in the Mediterranean basin have led to close cooperation both bilaterally and within the framework of the European Union.: Greece has an embassy in Madrid and 9 honorary consulates in Barcelona, Bilbao, Huelva, La Coruña, Las Palmas de Gran Canaria, Málaga, Palma de Mallorca, Seville and Valencia.; Spain has an embassy in Athens and an honorary consulate in Thessaloniki.; Both countries are full members of the European Union, NATO and of the Union for the Mediterranean. |
| Holy See | 1400s | See Holy See–Spain relations: The Holy See has a nunciature in Madrid.; Spain has an embassy to the Holy See based in Rome. |
| Hungary | December 1944 | See Hungary–Spain relations: Hungary has an embassy in Madrid and a consulate-general in Barcelona.; Spain has an embassy in Budapest.; Both countries are full members of the European Union and of the NATO. |
| Iceland | 20 September 1949 | See Iceland–Spain relations: Iceland has an embassy in Madrid.; Spain is accredited to Iceland from its embassy in Oslo, Norway and maintains an honorary consulate in Reykjavík.; Both countries are full members of the NATO. |
| Ireland | September 1935 | See Ireland–Spain relations: Ireland has an embassy in Madrid.; Spain has an embassy in Dublin.; Both countries are full members of the European Union and of the Council of Europe. |
| Italy | | See Italy–Spain relations Both countries established diplomatic relations after the unification of Italy. Relations between Italy and Spain have remained strong and affable for centuries owing to various political, cultural, and historical connections between the two nations. In the Early modern period, southern and insular Italy came under Spanish control, having been previously a domain of the Crown of Aragon. This extended period of foreign domination left marked influences in the modern southern Italian dialects. During the Spanish Civil War, the Corps of Volunteer Troops, a fascist expeditionary force from Italy, supported the Nationalist forces led by Francisco Franco. It's estimated that around 75,000 Italians fought in the war.: Italy has an embassy in Madrid and a consulate-general in Barcelona.; Spain has an embassy in Rome and consulates-general in Genoa, Milan and Naples.; Both countries are full members of the European Union, NATO and of the Union for the Mediterranean. |
| Latvia | 9 October 1991 | See Latvia–Spain relations: Latvia has an embassy in Madrid.; Spain has an embassy in Riga.; Both countries are full members of the European Union and of the NATO. |
| Lithuania | 7 October 1991 | See Lithuania–Spain relations: Lithuania has an embassy in Madrid.; Spain has an embassy in Vilnius.; Both countries are full members of the European Union and of the NATO. |
| Luxembourg | 9 February 1891 | See Luxembourg–Spain relations: Luxembourg has an embassy in Madrid.; Spain has an embassy in Luxembourg City.; Both countries are full members of the European Union and of the NATO. |
| Malta | 7 June 1968 | See Malta–Spain relations: Malta has an embassy in Madrid.; Spain has an embassy in Valletta.; Both countries are full members of the European Union, the Council of Europe and of the Union for the Mediterranean. |
| Moldova | 31 January 1992 | See Moldova–Spain relations: Moldova has an embassy in Madrid.; Spain is accredited to Moldova from its embassy in Bucharest, Romania.; Both countries are full members of the Council of Europe.; Moldova is an EU candidate and Spain is an EU member.; In 2008, the Spanish government indicated that 12,582 Moldovan citizens were legally working there. Spain is a significant investor in Moldova through Unión Fenosa which owns three of Moldova's five energy distribution companies. |
| Monaco | 2 June 1876 | See Monaco–Spain relations: Monaco has an embassy in Madrid.; Spain is accredited to Monaco from its embassy in Paris, France. |
| Montenegro | 11 December 2006 | See Montenegro–Spain relations: Montenegro has an embassy in Madrid.; Spain is accredited to Montenegro from its embassy in Belgrade, Serbia.; Both countries are full members of the NATO.; Spain supports Montenegro's EU membership. |
| Netherlands | | See Netherlands–Spain relations: Netherlands has an embassy in Madrid.; Spain has an embassy in The Hague.; Both countries are full members of the European Union and of the NATO. |
| North Macedonia | 28 July 1994 | See North Macedonia–Spain relations: North Macedonia has an embassy in Madrid.; Spain has an embassy in Skopje.; Both countries are full members of the NATO.; North Macedonia is an EU candidate and Spain is an EU member. |
| Norway | 26 November 1905 | See Norway–Spain relations: Norway has an embassy in Madrid.; Spain has an embassy in Oslo.; Both countries are full members of the NATO. |
| Poland | 17 September 1919 | See Poland–Spain relations: Poland has an embassy in Madrid and a consulate-general in Barcelona.; Spain has an embassy in Warsaw.; Both countries are full members of the European Union and of the NATO. |
| Portugal | 5 October 1143 | See Portugal–Spain relations Portugal's copy of the Treaty of Tordesillas (1494) divided the New World between Portugal and Castile. During the 15th century, Portugal built increasingly large fleets of ships and began to explore the world beyond Europe, sending explorers to Africa and Asia. Castile followed suit decades later. Following the first Spanish voyage of Christopher Columbus to the Caribbean in 1492, both states began acquiring territory in the New World. As a result of the 1494 Treaty of Tordesillas, Portugal acquired its most potentially important colony, Brazil (much of the South American continent), as well as a number of possessions in Africa and Asia, while Castile took the rest of South America and much of the North American continent as well as a number of possessions in Africa, Oceanía and Asia as the important colony of the Philippines. This line of demarcation was about halfway between the Cape Verde Islands (already Portuguese) and the islands claimed for Castile by Columbus on his first voyage. Although the Treaty of Tordesillas attempted to clarify their empires, many subsequent treaties were needed to establish the modern boundaries of Brazil and the 1529 Treaty of Zaragoza was needed to demarcate their Asian possessions. Henry of Portugal, reigned until his death (31 January 1580). He lacked heirs and his death triggered a succession crisis, where the main claimants to the throne were Philip II of Spain and Anthony, Prior of Crato. After the Spanish victory in the War of Portuguese Succession Philip of Spain was crowned king of Portugal in 1581, beginning a personal union between the two nations known as the Iberian Union generating a decline of the Portuguese Empire during the period of Union. The Iberian Union lasted for almost sixty years until 1640, when the Portuguese Restoration War was initiated against Spain and Portugal reestablished the Portuguese dynasty under the Bragança. Relations between Portugal and Spain are also good. They cooperate in the fight against drug trafficking and tackling forest fires (common in the Iberian Peninsula in summers), for example. These close relations are facilitated by similar governments: the government of conservative Spanish PM José María Aznar coincided with the government of also conservative José Manuel Durão Barroso in Portugal; today, both José Luis Rodríguez Zapatero of Spain and José Sócrates of Portugal are socialists. Portugal also holds claim to the disputed territory of Olivença in the Portuguese-Spanish border.: Portugal has an embassy in Madrid, consulates-general in Barcelona and Seville, and a vice-consulate in Vigo.; Spain has an embassy in Lisbon and a consulate-general in Porto.; Both countries are full members of the European Union, NATO and of the Union for the Mediterranean. |
| Romania | 5 July 1881 | See Romania–Spain relations: Romania has an embassy in Madrid and consulates-general in Barcelona, Bilbao and Seville.; Spain has an embassy in Bucharest.; Both countries are full members of the European Union, of the NATO and of the Latin Union.; There are around 730,000 people of Romanian descent living in Spain. |
| Russia | 20 July 1812 | See Russia–Spain relations Spain and the Grand Duchy of Moscow first exchanged envoys in the 1520s; regular embassies were established in 1722. Soviet-Spanish relations, once terminated after the Spanish Civil War, were gradually reestablished since 1963 and fully established in 1977. Trade between two countries amounts to two billion Euros (2008); in March 2009 two countries signed an energy agreement providing national energy companies access to other party's domestic markets.: Russia has an embassy in Madrid and a consulate-general in Barcelona.; Spain has an embassy in Moscow and a consulate-general in Saint Petersburg.; See also: Russians in Spain |
| Serbia | 14 October 1916 | See Serbia–Spain relations: In light of the February 2008 unilateral declaration of independence by the Kosovo authorities, Spain has become a staunch supporter of Serbia's sovereignty and territorial integrity, and relations have thrived in recent years as a result.; Serbia has an embassy in Madrid.; Spain has an embassy in Belgrade.; Serbia is an EU candidate and Spain is an EU member.; Serbian Ministry of Foreign Affairs about relations with Spain; Spanish Ministry of Foreign Relations about relations with Serbia (in Spanish only) |
| Slovakia | 1 January 1993 | See Slovakia–Spain relations: Slovakia has an embassy in Madrid.; Spain has an embassy in Bratislava.; Both countries are full members of the European Union and of the NATO. |
| Slovenia | 25 March 1992 | See Slovenia–Spain relations: Slovenia has an embassy in Madrid.; Spain has an embassy in Ljubljana.; Both countries are full members of the European Union and of the NATO. |
| Sweden | 1651 | See Spain–Sweden relations: Spain has an embassy in Stockholm.; Sweden has an embassy in Madrid.; Both countries are full members of the European Union, the NATO and of the Council of Europe.; Spain fully supported Sweden's application to join NATO, which resulted in membership on 7 March 2024. |
| Switzerland | 14 February 1939 | See Spain–Switzerland relations: Spain has an embassy in Bern.; Switzerland has an embassy in Madrid and a consulate-general in Barcelona. |
| Ukraine | 30 January 1992 | See Spain–Ukraine relations: Spain recognized Ukraine's independence in 1991.; Spain has an embassy in Kyiv.; Ukraine has an embassy in Madrid and a consulate-general in Barcelona and a consulate in Málaga.; Both countries are full members of the Council of Europe. Since 1991, many Ukrainians have emigrated to Spain to work.; Spain is an EU member and Ukraine is an EU candidate.; Spanish Ministry of Foreign Affairs about relations with Ukraine (in Spanish only) |
| United Kingdom | April 1509 | See Spain–United Kingdom relations Spanish Prime Minister Pedro Sánchez with British Prime Minister Keir Starmer in 10 Downing Street, September 2025. Spain established diplomatic relations with the United Kingdom in April 1509.: Spain maintains an embassy in London.; The United Kingdom is accredited to Spain through its embassy in Madrid, a consulate general Barcelona, and consulates in Alicante, Ibiza, Las Palmas, Malaga, Palma de Mallorca, and Santa Cruz de Tenerife.; Both countries share common membership of the Council of Europe, the European Court of Human Rights, the International Criminal Court, NATO, the OECD, the OSCE, and the World Trade Organization. Bilaterally the two countries have a Double Taxation Convention. |

=== Oceania ===
| Country | Date formal relations began | Notes |
|---|---|---|
| Australia | 26 October 1967 | See Australia–Spain relations: Australia has an embassy in Madrid.; Spain has an embassy in Canberra and consulates-general in Melbourne and Sydney. |
| Federated States of Micronesia | 11 May 1992 | The FS of Micronesia were once part of the Spanish East Indies.: The FS of Micronesia do not have an accreditation to Spain.; Spain is accredited to the FS of Micronesia from its embassy in Manila, Philippines. |
| Fiji | 10 December 1976 | Fiji is accredited to Spain from its embassy in Brussels, Belgium.; Spain is accredited to Fiji from its embassy in Wellington, New Zealand. |
| Kiribati | 24 September 2011 | |
| Marshall Islands | 17 December 1991 | See Marshall Islands–Spain relations The Marshall Islands were once part of the Spanish East Indies.: Marshall Islands do not have an accreditation to Spain.; Spain is accredited to the Marshall Islands from its embassy in Manila, Philippines. |
| New Zealand | 28 March 1969 | See New Zealand–Spain relations: New Zealand has an embassy in Madrid.; Spain has an embassy in Wellington. |
| Palau | 3 August 1995 | See Palau–Spain relations Palau was once part of the Spanish East Indies.: Palau does not have an accreditation to Spain.; Spain is accredited to Palau from its embassy in Manila, Philippines. |
| Papua New Guinea | 28 August 1978 | Papua New Guinea is accredited to Spain from its embassy in Brussels, Belgium.; Spain is accredited to Papua New Guinea from its embassy in Canberra, Australia. |
| Samoa | 5 November 1980 | Samoa is accredited to Spain from its embassy in Brussels, Belgium.; Spain is accredited to Samoa from its embassy in Wellington, New Zealand. |
| Solomon Islands | 8 August 1980 | See Solomon Islands–Spain relations |
| Tonga | 16 November 1979 | Spain is accredited to Tonga from its embassy in Wellington, New Zealand.; Tonga does not have an accreditation to Spain. |

== See also ==
- History of Spain
  - Peninsular War (1807–1814), Napoleon versus Great Britain
  - Spanish American wars of independence
  - History of Spain (1808–1874)
  - Spain during World War I
  - Accession Treaty of Spain to the European Economic Community
- France–Spain relations
  - History of French foreign relations
  - History of the foreign relations of the United Kingdom
- Spain–United States relations
- List of diplomatic missions in Spain
  - List of diplomatic missions in Madrid
- List of diplomatic missions of Spain
- Spanish Institute for Foreign Trade
