= Bhutan–Spain relations =

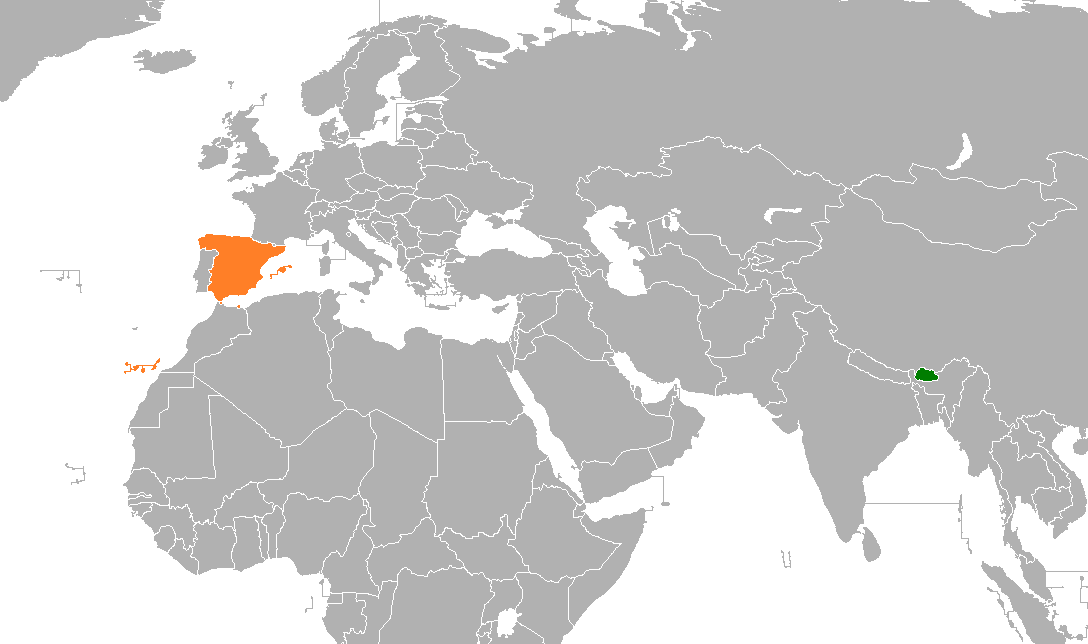
- Bhutan: Spain

Bhutan–Spain relations are the bilateral relations between Bhutan and Spain.

== History ==
Under a treaty signed between Bhutan and India on 8 August 1949, Bhutan's foreign policy was guided by India until the treaty was superseded in 2007. Bhutan joined the United Nations in 1971. Until October 2010, the Kingdom of Spain and the Kingdom of Bhutan had not established diplomatic relations, although they had maintained informal contacts. This was generally done through the Spanish diplomatic mission in New Delhi, within the United Nations, or within the framework of the European Union.

The relations between the two countries were first formalized on 19 October 2010, during a four-day diplomatic visit to Spain by the Bhutanese Prime Minister, Jigme Yoser Thinley, who was given an audience by King Juan Carlos I and held a meeting with the then Minister of Foreign Affairs, Miguel Ángel Moratinos.

At the meeting, both parties agreed to begin the process of establishing diplomatic relations between the two kingdoms. Before 19 October 2010, Bhutan was one of just two countries in the world, along with Kiribati, that did not have diplomatic relations with Spain.

After four months, on 11 February 2011, the Permanent Representative Ambassador of Spain to the United Nations in New York City proceeded to exchange verbal notes with the Bhutanese Ambassador, officially establishing diplomatic relations between the two countries. Both heads of mission sent a joint letter to the Secretary-General of the United Nations announcing the establishment of diplomatic relations between the Kingdom of Spain and the Kingdom of Bhutan and requesting a copy of the letter to be circulated among all UN member states.

The permanent missions of both countries issued a joint communiqué stating that Spain and Bhutan had decided to establish diplomatic and consular relations, applying the Vienna Convention on Diplomatic Relations of 24 April 1961 and the Vienna Convention on Consular Relations of 24 April 1963, as well as exchanging diplomatic representatives at ambassadorial level.

== Diplomatic missions ==
The Spanish Embassy in New Delhi and the Bhutanese Embassy in Brussels – under a multiple accreditation regime – are responsible for carrying out diplomatic and consular relations between the two countries. The establishment of diplomatic relations with Bhutan responds to the principle of universality that governs Spanish foreign policy.

== Economic relations ==
Commerce Bhutan – Spain (million euros)
Balance of trade	2004	2005	2006	2007
Imports	0,01	0,00	0,00	0,00
Exports	0,03	0,00	0,00	0,01
Balance	0,02	0,00	0,00	0,01
Coverage rate	300,00	N.S.	N.S.	N.S.
% Import variation	N.S.	–100,00	N.S.	N.S.
% Export Variation	200,00	–100,00	N.S.	N.S.
January June. Variation rate over previous year.
Source: D.G. Customs

== See also ==
- Foreign relations of Bhutan
- Foreign relations of Spain
