= Spain–Yemen relations =

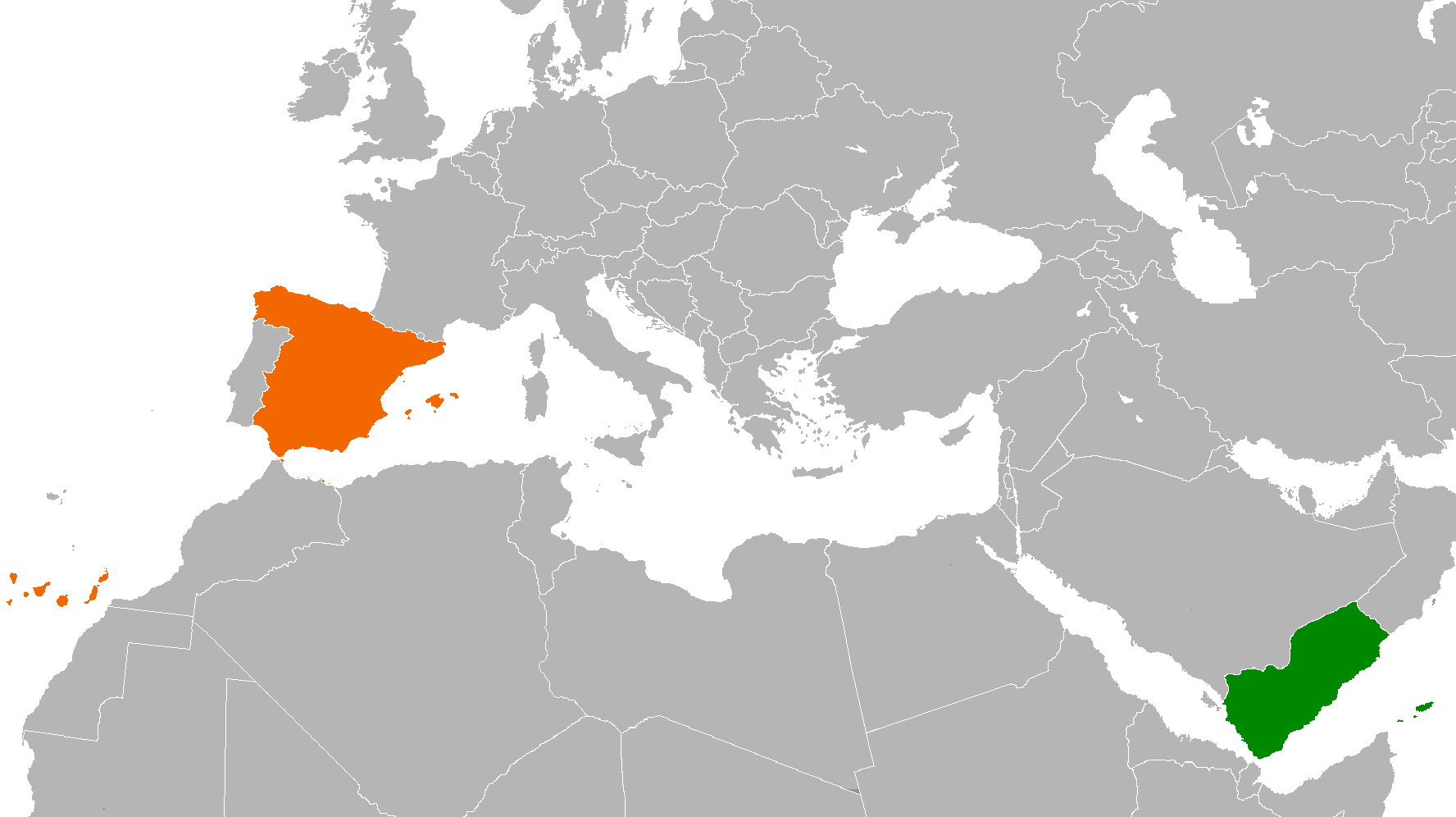
- Spain: Yemen

Spain–Yemen relations are the bilateral and diplomatic relations between these two countries. Yemen has an embassy in Madrid. Spain has an embassy in Sana'a.

== Bilateral relations ==
The Embassy of Spain in Yemen was inaugurated in April 2006. This opening sought to boost bilateral relations between the two countries, focusing such cooperation on certain aspects:

- Development Cooperation: Yemen is not included in the Master Plan for Spanish Cooperation for the period 2012–14. It is important that Spain becomes a bilateral donor to help promote the political, social and economic stability of this country.
- Commerce: Yemen is a country with possibilities for Spain, the sectors that most interest are: fishing, infrastructure and natural resources. In this regard, a series of bilateral Memoranda and Agreements for bilateral collaboration in the different sectors have been signed.
- Consular: After the transfer to Spain in July 2010 of the Spanish citizen sentenced to death in Yemen Nabil Manakli, consular affairs have normalized and focus today on the protection of the Spanish colony in the current context of crisis. In this regard, the Embassy evacuated the bulk of the colony in March 2011, except for those of its members who voluntarily decided to remain in Yemen.

== Economic relations ==
There are no Spanish companies established in Yemen, although some multinationals are present in the market through distribution contracts. The most promising sectors for Spanish companies are infrastructure, fishing derivatives and the development and rehabilitation of tourist areas. To this it is possible that the desalination of seawater is added in the coming years. A sector that is not at all exploited and perhaps interesting for Spanish companies is that of renewable energy. Solar energy is not just exploited in Yemen and would be an important business niche at this time of drastic fall in oil production.

In 2011, the company, "The Valencian Machinist" signed a contract for the installation of five lighthouses on the Red Sea islands. Likewise, several companies have shown their interest in attending various works competitions called by the Government of Yemen, and that it is possible to be carried out throughout 2012: specifically, the projects of the Moka wind power plant, the laying of a High voltage network, the work and conditioning of the new terminal of the Saná International Airport and the internal communications system of the Ministry of Interior.

== See also ==
- Foreign relations of Spain
- Foreign relations of Yemen
