= List of diplomatic missions in Madrid =

This is a list of the 126 resident embassies in Madrid. For other diplomatic missions in Spain, see List of diplomatic missions in Spain.

== Embassies ==
| Country | Mission type | Address | Photo | Website |
|---|---|---|---|---|
| Afghanistan | Embassy | Calle de Moralzarzal, 44 | | |
| Albania | Embassy | Calle Lagasca, 68 . 1ºB | | |
| Algeria | Embassy | Calle del General Oraá, 12 | | |
| Andorra | Embassy | Calle Alcalá, 73 | | |
| Angola | Embassy | Calle Lagasca, 88, floor 2 | | |
| Antigua and Barbuda | Embassy | Calle Felipe IV, 7 | | |
| Argentina | Embassy | Calle Fernando el Santo 15 | | |
| Armenia | Embassy | Calle Mayor, 81 | | |
| Australia | Embassy | Paseo de la Castellana, 259D, floor 24 | | |
| Austria | Embassy | Paseo de la Castellana 91, floor 9 | | |
| Azerbaijan | Embassy | Calle de Velázquez 43, floor 1 | | |
| Bangladesh | Embassy | Calle Manuel Marañon, 13 | | |
| Belarus | Embassy | Calle Caleruega, 81, 2A | | |
| Belgium | Embassy | Paseo de la Castellana 18, floor 6 | | |
| Bolivia | Embassy | Calle Guisando, 27 | | |
| Bosnia and Herzegovina | Embassy | Calle Lagasca 24, floor 2 | | |
| Brazil | Embassy | Calle de Fernando El Santo, 6 | | |
| Bulgaria | Embassy | Travesía de Santa María Magdalena, 15 | | |
| Cameroon | Embassy | Calle de Rosario Pino, 3 | | |
| Cape Verde | Embassy | Calle del Principe de Vergara, 93 | | |
| Canada | Embassy | Paseo de la Castellana, 259D | | |
| Chile | Embassy | Lagasca 88, floor 6 | | |
| China | Embassy | Calle Arturo Soria, 111-113 | | |
| Colombia | Embassy | Paseo del General Martínez Campos, 48 | | |
| Congo-Kinshasa | Embassy | Calle Doctor Fleming 45, 1 °F | | |
| Costa Rica | Embassy | Calle Ríos Rosas, 54 | | |
| Croatia | Embassy | Calle Claudio Coello 78, floor 2 | | |
| Cuba | Embassy | Paseo de la Habana, 194 | | |
| Cyprus | Embassy | Paseo de la Castellana 45, floors 4 & 5 | | |
| Czech Republic | Embassy | Avenida Pío XII, 22-24 | | |
| Denmark | Embassy | Calle Serrano 26, floor 7 | | |
| Dominican Republic | Embassy | Paseo de la Castellana 30, 1° D | | |
| Ecuador | Embassy | Calle Velázquez 114, floor 2 | | |
| Egypt | Embassy | Calle Velázquez, 69 | | |
| El Salvador | Embassy | Paseo de la Castellana 178, 1 D | | |
| Equatorial Guinea | Embassy | Avenida de Pío XII, 14 | | |
| Estonia | Embassy | Calle Claudio Coello 91 - 1D | | |
| Finland | Embassy | Paseo de la Castellana, 15 | | |
| France | Embassy | Calle Salustiano Olózaga, 9 | | |
| Gabon | Embassy | Calle Orense 68, floor 2 | | |
| Gambia | Embassy | Calle Hernández Iglesias, 20B | | |
| Georgia | Embassy | Calle de Antonio Maura 12, first floor | | |
| Germany | Embassy | Calle de Fortuny, 8 | | |
| Ghana | Embassy | Calle Hernandez de Tejada, 10 | | |
| Greece | Embassy | Avenida Dr. Arce 24 | | |
| Guatemala | Embassy | Calle Velázquez 114, 1st floor | | |
| Guinea | Embassy | Calle Luis Muriel, 4 | | |
| Guinea-Bissau | Embassy | Avenida de América, 16 | | |
| Haiti | Embassy | Paseo de la Castellana 15, floor 3 | | |
| Holy See | Apostolic Nunciature | Avenida Pio XII, 46 | | |
| Honduras | Embassy | Paseo de la Castellana 134, 1-D | | |
| Hungary | Embassy | Calle de Fortuny 6, floor 4 | | |
| Iceland | Embassy | Calle de Marqués de la Ensenada 2, floor 3 | | |
| India | Embassy | Avenida Pio XII, 30-32 | | |
| Indonesia | Embassy | Calle de Agastia, 65 | | |
| Iran | Embassy | Calle de Jerez, 5 | | |
| Iraq | Embassy | Calle Carril del Conde, 56 | | |
| Ireland | Embassy | Paseo de la Castellana 46-4 | | |
| Israel | Embassy | Calle Velázquez 150, floor 7 | | |
| Italy | Embassy | Calle Lagasca, 98 | | |
| Ivory Coast | Embassy | Calle de Serrano, 154 | | |
| Japan | Embassy | Calle Serrano, 109 | | |
| Jordan | Embassy | Paseo del General Martinez Campos, 41 | | |
| Kazakhstan | Embassy | Avenida de los Madroños, 43 | | |
| Kenya | Embassy | Calle Segre, 13 | | |
| Kuwait | Embassy | Avenida de Miraflores, 61 | | |
| Latvia | Embassy | Calle de Moreto 5 - 1d | | |
| Lebanon | Embassy | Calle de Claudio Coello, 65 | | |
| Libya | Embassy | Avenida Comandante Franco, 32 | | |
| Lithuania | Embassy | Calle del Pisuerga, 5 | | |
| Luxembourg | Embassy | Calle Claudio Coello, 78 | | |
| Malaysia | Embassy | Avenida de los Madroños, 63 bis | | |
| Mali | Embassy | Calle Serrano 174 | | |
| Malta | Embassy | Paseo de la Castellana, 45 – 6 | | |
| Mauritania | Embassy | Calle Piedralaves, 4 | | |
| Mexico | Embassy | Carrera de San Jerónimo, 46 | | |
| Moldova | Embassy | Paseo de la Castellana 178, floor 5 | | |
| Monaco | Embassy | Calle Villanueva, 12 | | |
| Montenegro | Embassy | Calle Alcalá, 89 | | |
| Morocco | Embassy | Calle Serrano, 179 | | |
| Mozambique | Embassy | Calle Moscatelar, 2E | | |
| Nepal | Embassy | General Oraa 3 | | |
| Netherlands | Embassy | Paseo de la Castellana 259-D | | |
| New Zealand | Embassy | Calle de Pinar 7, 3rd floor | | |
| Nicaragua | Embassy | Calle de Maudes 51, 8th floor | | |
| Nigeria | Embassy | Calle Segre, 23 | | |
| North Macedonia | Embassy | Calle Don Ramon de la Cruz, 107-2B | | |
| Norway | Embassy | Calle Serrano 26, floor 5 | | |
| Oman | Embassy | Avenida Cardenal Herrera Oria, 138 | | |
| Pakistan | Embassy | Calle Pedro de Valdivia, 1 | | |
| Panama | Embassy | Calle de Caracas, 23 | | |
| Paraguay | Embassy | Calle de Dr Fleming Número 3, floor 3 | | |
| Peru | Embassy | Calle de Zurbano, 70 | | |
| Philippines | Embassy | Calle Eresma, 2 | | |
| Poland | Embassy | Calle Guisando 23 bis | | |
| Portugal | Embassy | Calle Lagasca 88 - 4º A | | |
| Qatar | Embassy | Paseo de la Castellana, 15 | | |
| Romania | Embassy | Avenida de Alfonso XIII, 157 | | |
| Russia | Embassy | Calle Velázquez, 155 | | |
| Rwanda | Embassy | | | |
| San Marino | Embassy | Calle Padre Jesus Ordonez, 18 | | |
| Saudi Arabia | Embassy | Calle Dr. Alvarez Sierra, 3 | | |
| Senegal | Embassy | Calle Moralzarzal, 18 | | |
| Serbia | Embassy | Calle Velázquez 3, floor 2 | | |
| Slovakia | Embassy | Calle de Pinar, 20 | | |
| Slovenia | Embassy | Calle de los Hermanos Bécquer, 7 | | |
| South Africa | Embassy | Calle de Claudio Coello 91-6 | | |
| South Korea | Embassy | Calle González Amigó, 15 | | |
| Sovereign Military Order of Malta | Embassy | Calle del Prado, 26 | | |
| Sudan | Embassy | Avenida de Miraflores, 63 | | |
| Sweden | Embassy | Calle Caracas, 25 | | |
| Switzerland | Embassy | Calle Núñez de Balboa 35A, 7th floor | | |
| Syria | Embassy | Plaza Plateria de Martinez, 1 | | |
| Thailand | Embassy | Calle Joaquin Costa, 29 | | |
| Tunisia | Embassy | Avenida de Alfonso XIII, 64 | | |
| Turkey | Embassy | Calle Rafael Calvo, 18 2ºA-B | | |
| Ukraine | Embassy | Ronda Abubilla, 52 | | |
| United Arab Emirates | Embassy | Calle Hernandez de Tejada, 7 | | |
| United Kingdom | Embassy | Paseo de la Castellana 259D | | |
| United States | Embassy | Calle de Serrano, 75 | | |
| Uruguay | Embassy | Paseo Pintor Rosales, 28 | | |
| Uzbekistan | Embassy | Plaza Lealtad, 3 | | |
| Venezuela | Embassy | Calle del Poeta Joan Maragall, 1 | | |
| Vietnam | Embassy | Calle Segre, 5 | | |
| Yemen | Embassy | Paseo de la Castellana 117, floor 8 | | |

== Consulates-general ==
| Country | Mission type | Address | Photo | Website |
|---|---|---|---|---|
| Belgium | Consulate-General | Paseo de la Castellana 18 | | |
| Bolivia | Consulate-General | Calle Aviador Lindbergh, 3 | | |
| Brazil | Consulate-General | Calle Goya 5 y 7 | | |
| Chile | Consulate-General | Calle Rafael Calvo 18 | | |
| Colombia | Consulate-General | Calle Lagasca 88, 7th floor | | |
| Dominican Republic | Consulate-General | Paseo de la Castellana, 128 | | |
| Ecuador | Consulate-General | Calle Comandante Azcárraga 2 | | |
| El Salvador | Consulate-General | Calle de Villanueva 35, lower level | | |
| France | Consulate-General | Calle Marqués de la Ensenada 10 | | |
| Hungary | Consulate | Calle Ángel de Diego Roldán 21 | | |
| Italy | Consulate-General | Calle Agustín de Betancourt 3 | | |
| Morocco | Consulate-General | Calle Leizarán 31 | | |
| Paraguay | Consulate-General | Calle Alberto Alcocer 45 | | |
| Peru | Consulate-General | Paseo del Pintor Rosales 30 | | |
| Russia | Consulate-General | Calle Joaquín Costa 33 | | |
| Senegal | Consulate-General | Calle Palermo 13 | | |
| Uruguay | Consulate-General | Paseo Pintor Rosales 32, 8th floor | | |
| Venezuela | Consulate-General | Calle de Eloy Gonzalo, 40 | | |

== Other delegations and missions ==
| Country | Mission type | Address | Photo | Website |
|---|---|---|---|---|
| Palestine | Diplomatic Mission | Avenida de Pío XII, 20 | | |
| Sahrawi Republic | Delegation | Calle del Príncipe de Vergara 83, 1st floor | | |
| Taiwan | Representative Office | Calle de Rosario Pino, 14 | | |

== Honorary consulates ==
| Country | Mission type | Accredited embassy | Address | Photo | Website |
|---|---|---|---|---|---|
| Bhutan | Honorary Consulate-General | Embassy of Bhutan in Brussels | Embajada de Bután en Bruselas | Calle Buenavista 18, Algete | |
| Jamaica | Honorary Consulate | Embassy of Jamaica in Burssels | Calle Juan de Mena, 6 | | |
| Liberia | Honorary Consulate-General | Embassy of Liberia in Paris | Anabel Segura 10, floor 3, Alcobendas | | |
| Singapore | Honorary Consulate-General | | Avenida de Bruselas 28, Alcobendas | | |

== Official Residences ==
| Country | Address | Image |
|---|---|---|
| Algeria | Avenida de Miraflores, 36 | |
| Argentina | Calle Fernando el Santo, 11 | |
| Belgium | Palacete del Marqués de Rafal, Madrid | |
| Canada | Calle de Colmenar Viejo | |
| Colombia | Calle de Fortuny, 36 | |
| Croatia | Ronda Abubilla, 34 | |
| Cuba | Ronda de Sobradiel, 32 | |
| Finland | Calle Piedralaves, 1 | |
| Greece | Avenida de Miraflores, 15 | |
| Jordan | Av. de los Madroños, 70 | |
| Mali | Calle del Camino Viejo 5, Alcobendas | |
| Mexico | Calle del Pinar, 13 | |
| Monaco | Calle del Camino Viejo 9, Alcobendas | |
| Netherlands | Calle de la Isla de Oza, 24 | |
| Nigeria | Calle de Madrigal, 5 | |
| Oman | Paseo de la Marquesa Viuda de Aldama 17, Alcobendas | |
| Pakistan | Avenida de los Madroños, 63 | |
| Peru | Ronda de Sobradiel, 42 | |
| Qatar | Paseo de la Marquesa Viuda de Aldama 7, Alcobendas | |
| Saudi Arabia | Calle Veredilla 1, Alcobendas | |
| Switzerland | Avenida de Miraflores, 51 | |
| United Arab Emirates | Paseo de la Marquesa Viuda de Aldama 20B, Alcobendas | |
| United Kingdom | Avenida de Miraflores, 23 | |
| United States | Paseo de la Castellana, 48 | |
| Venezuela | Avenida de Miraflores, 38 | |

== See also ==
- Foreign relations of Spain
- List of diplomatic missions in Spain
