= 2022 Spain letter bomb attacks =

Series of letter bomb attacks

- Location: Madrid and Zaragoza, Spain
- Date: 24 November 2022- 1 December 2022
- Target: Pedro Sánchez, Instalaza, Ukrainian and American embassies, Torrejón Air Base, Ministry of Defence
- Attack type: Letter bombing
- Deaths: 0
- Injuries: 1
- Perpetrator: Pompeyo González Pascual

In late November and early December 2022, a number of letter bombs were mailed to locations across Spain. Packages were received at high-profile individuals and locations, including the Prime Minister of Spain's Moncloa residence, the Ukrainian and U.S. embassies in Madrid, Torrejon Air Base, and the arms manufacturer Instalaza. One person was injured in the attacks—a security officer at the Ukrainian embassy in Madrid.

== Timeline ==
On 24 November 2022, a letter bomb, addressed to the Prime Minister of Spain Pedro Sánchez, arrived at Moncloa Palace in Madrid, Spain. The bomb was destroyed in a controlled explosion, with no injuries reported.

On 30 November 2022, further letter bombs were mailed. The first was mailed to the Ukrainian embassy in Madrid, exploding when a security officer opened it in the garden of the embassy, leaving a "very small wound" on one finger. Arms manufacturer Instalaza, in Zaragoza, received a similar package hours later.

On 1 December 2022, before dawn, another letter bomb was intercepted after being detected by a scanner, at the Torrejon Air Base near Madrid. The package was addressed to the European Union Satellite Centre at the base. On the same day, an additional letter bomb was received at the Defence Ministry and was defused. A sixth letter bomb was sent to the US embassy in Madrid and was intercepted at around 12.30 pm local time. It was subsequently "safely detonated."

== Investigation and responses ==
Each of the letter bombs were reportedly similar, in brown envelopes addressed to the heads of each institution. The devices consisted of loose gunpowder with an electrical ignition mechanism, resulting in a burning, rather than exploding effect.

An official, Rosa Serrano, told radio station SER that the packages sent to both the Ukrainian embassy and Instalaza had the same return address.

In response to the letter bomb attacks, Spanish authorities increased security measures at public and diplomatic buildings. The Foreign Minister of Ukraine Dmytro Kuleba ordered that the security of all Ukrainian embassies be increased, and urged Spain to investigate the attack. Spain's High Court was reported to have opened an investigation for a possible case of terrorism.

In December 2022, Spanish authorities disclosed they believed the letters were postmarked from the city of Valladolid.

According to a January 2023 New York Times report citing unnamed U.S. officials, Spanish investigators and their Western foreign counterparts have come to believe that the letter bomb attacks were perpetrated by the Russian Imperial Movement acting on behalf of Russian intelligence. U.S. officials had also suspected Russian military intelligence officers of directing associates of a white supremacist militant group to carry out the attacks.

=== Arrest of suspect ===
On 26 January 2023, a 74-year-old Spanish citizen was arrested by Spanish police on suspicion of sending the letter bombs. The Spanish Interior Ministry reported that there were no indications of any association with far-right organizations or Russia. They stated that they believed the suspect was responsible for making and sending all six letter bombs himself, but that the possibility of "participation or influence of other people" was not ruled out. On 23 July 2024, the Audiencia Nacional sentenced the suspect, identified as Pompeyo González Pascual, to 18 years' imprisonment for sending the bombs.
