= Simon Soekarno =

Indonesian diplomat (born 1966)

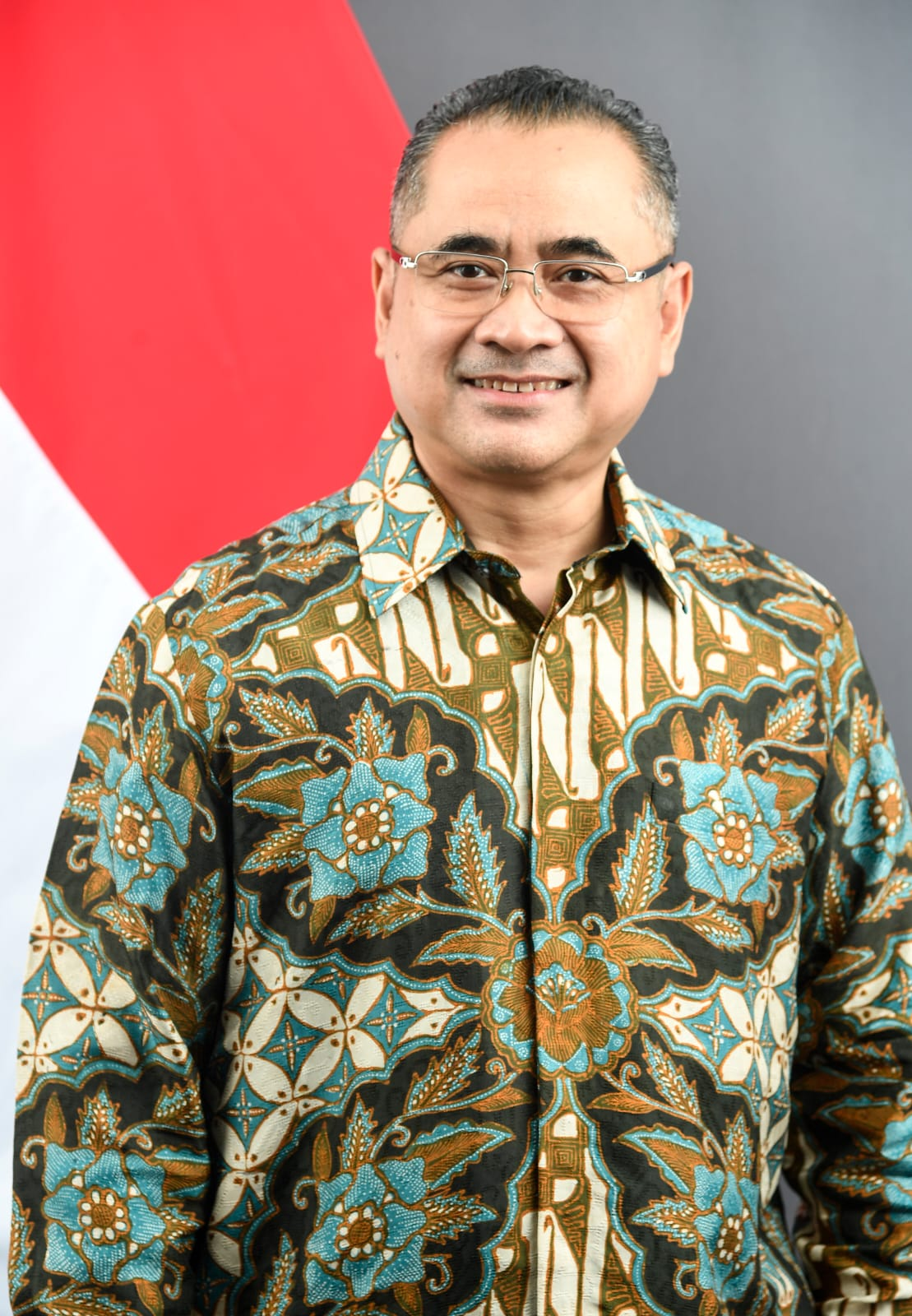

Ambassador of Indonesia to Cuba, the Bahamas, the Dominican Republic, Jamaica, and Haiti
- Incumbent
- Assumed office 24 March 2025
- Preceded by: Nana Yuliana

Personal details
- Born: 28 October 1966 (age 59) Jakarta, Indonesia
- Spouse: Anastasia Eveline Anggraini
- Children: 2
- Education: Atma Jaya Catholic University of Indonesia; University of Kent

Simon Djatwoko Irwantoro Soekarno (born 28 October 1966) is an Indonesian diplomat who is currently serving as ambassador to Cuba, with concurrent accreditation to the Bahamas, Dominica, Jamaica, and Haiti. Prior to his appointment to the position, he served as consul general in Los Angeles, San Francisco, and as director of consular affairs in the foreign ministry.

== Early life and education ==
Born in Jakarta on 28 October 1966, Simon was born as the sixth of seven children of Among Soekarno, a career diplomat, and Sri Hartati. His father inspired Simon to follow in his footsteps, but was initially against the idea, as Simon's two older brothers had already become diplomats. Having moved from country to country throughout his childhood due to his father's career, he developed a deep understanding of the diplomacy from adolescence. Simon Soekarno majored in law at the Atma Jaya Catholic University of Indonesia and graduated in 1990 with a thesis on the legal concept of advertising broadcast agreements. He then pursued master's degree from the University of Kent.

Simon Soekarno's career as a diplomat began with a challenging first assignment to Santiago, Chile, in December 1997. His mother had fallen into a coma from cancer, but she briefly recovered and insisted he not delay his departure. Just two days after arriving in Chile, he was told his mother had re-entered a coma and was advised to return home immediately. He managed to secure a flight back to Jakarta just before Christmas. Upon his arrival at the hospital, he held his mother's feet and said, "I have arrived," at which point her heartbeat flatlined.

After his service in Chile, Simon was assigned to the foreign ministry's inspectorate general as the chief of the C subregion from 2003 to 2006. From 2006 to 2009, he was assigned to the embassy in Madrid to head the consular and protocol affairs as a first secretary. He then returned to the foreign ministry as the chief of foreign guests in the protocol directorate from 2009 to 2011, before returning to overseas assignment as coordinator for social and cultural affairs and spokesperson within the embassy in Singapore. He oversaw the 2014 elections for Indonesian citizens, in which the embassy's election committee implemented barcode technology to prevent electoral fraud during the legislative elections.

Following his service in the embassy, Simon was posted as director for protocol affairs in the foreign ministry from 2014 to 2017. From September 2017 to February 2019, Simon became the consul general in Los Angeles. He was then appointed as the consul general in San Francisco on 1 March 2019 and served until his appointment as the director for consular affairs on 9 March 2022.

In August 2024, President Joko Widodo nominated Simon as Indonesia's ambassador to Cuba, with concurrent accreditation to the Bahamas, Dominica, Jamaica, and Haiti. He passed a fit and proper test held by the House of Representative's first commission in September that year and was installed by President Prabowo Subianto on 24 March 2025. He presented his credentials to the President of Cuba Miguel Díaz-Canel on 23 September 2025, Governor General of the Bahamas Cynthia A. Pratt on 16 October 2025, President of the Dominican Republic Luis Abinader on 19 August 2026, and Governor General of Jamaica Patrick Allen on 3 September 2026.

== Personal life ==
Simon Soekarno is a Catholic and the husband of Anastasia Eveline Anggraini. They have two sons, Jason Alexander Pratama Soekarno and Diego Dwiputranto Soekarno. He is fluent in English, German, and Spanish.
