= Indonesia–Spain relations =

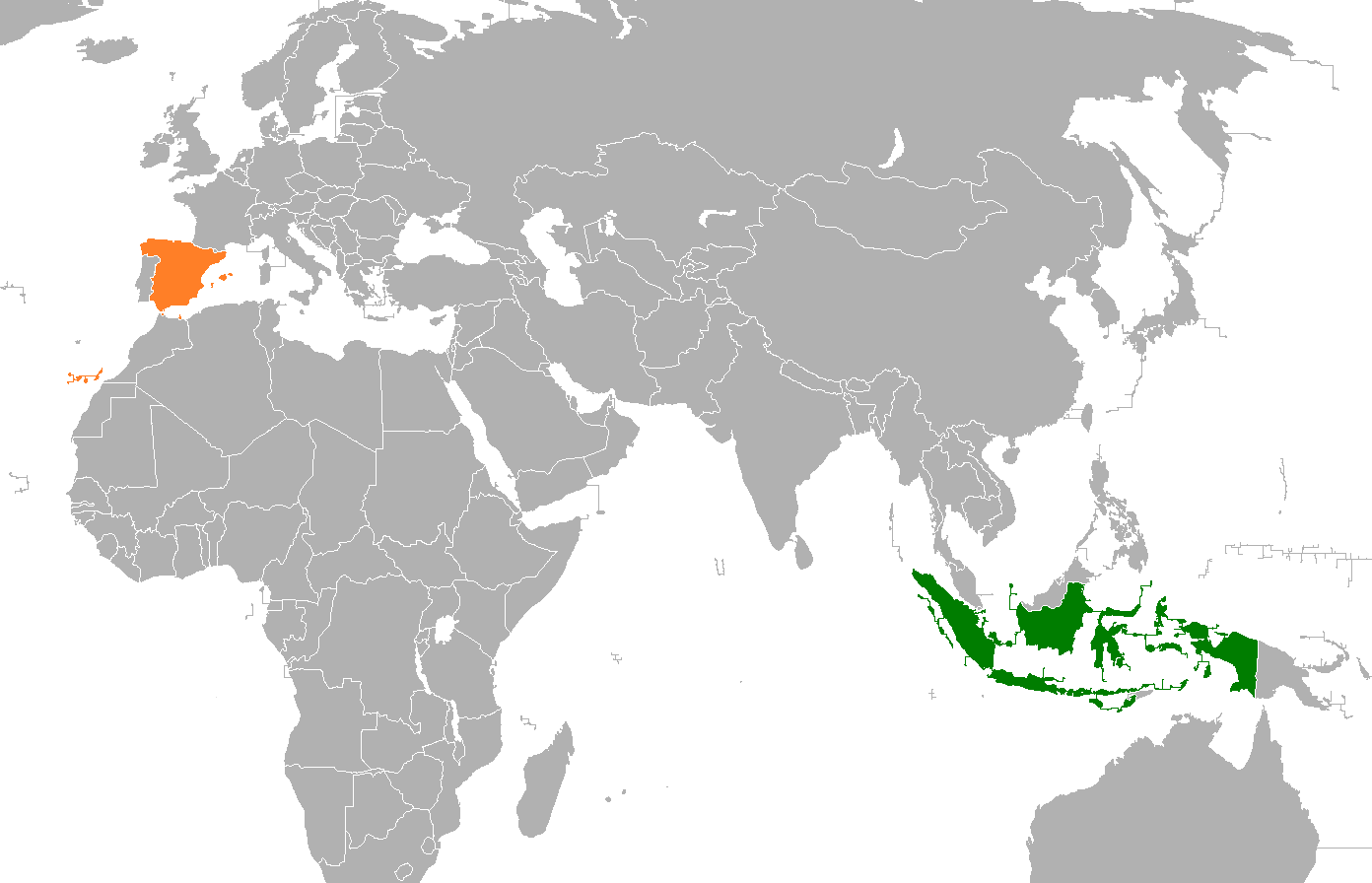
- Indonesia: Spain

Diplomatic mission
- Embassy of Indonesia, Madrid: Embassy of Spain, Jakarta

Indonesia and Spain established diplomatic relations in 1958. Spain identifies Indonesia as their natural ally and has named Indonesia as one of their priority nations in their foreign relations with the Asia-Pacific region. Indonesia has an embassy in Madrid, while Spain has an embassy in Jakarta and a consulate in Seminyak, Bali. Cooperation between the two nations have expanded to various fields, including trade, culture, education, and defense technology.

== History ==
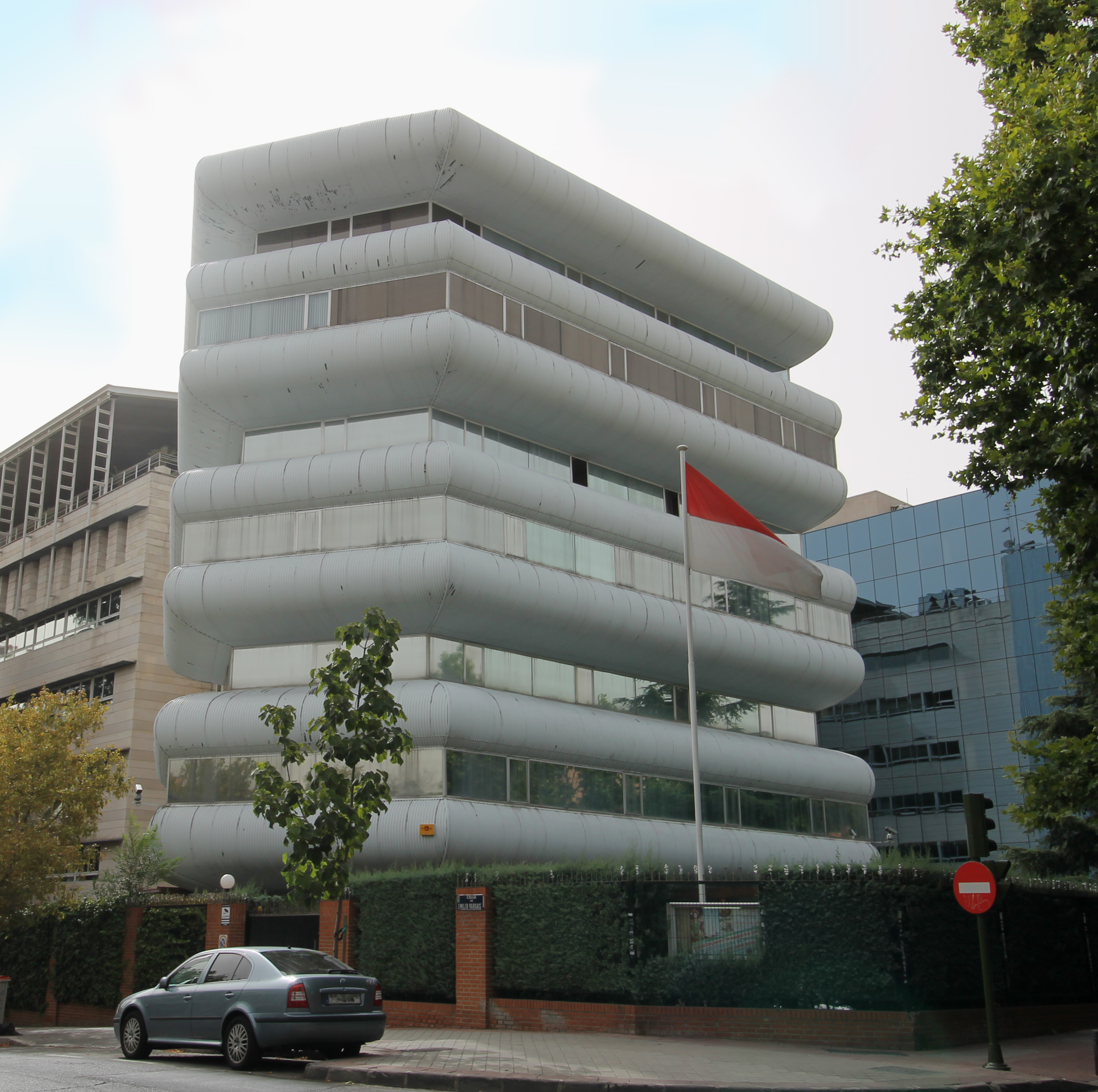
Embassy of Indonesia in Madrid

Initial contact between the Spanish Empire and early kingdoms in Indonesian eastern islands was made in the 16th century, although it was Portuguese, British and Dutch that exercised their colonial rules in the Indonesian archipelago.

During the Age of Exploration in early 16th century, King Charles I of Spain sent Ferdinand Magellan to find the west route to reach the Spice Islands. During this period, Spain was contesting Portuguese domination in Indonesian eastern archipelago, and briefly ruled North Sulawesi and Tidore in Maluku, before later pushed north to the Philippines archipelago by the Dutch East India Company in 1663.

The diplomatic relations were officially commenced in 1958, followed with the establishment of embassies in each counterpart capitals. In the aftermath of the December 2004 Indian Ocean tsunami in Banda Aceh in Sumatra island, Spanish military forces together with other international helps and international search and rescue teams, was involved in the tsunami disaster relief efforts between Aceh and Nias island.

== State visits ==
On 5–8 February 2007, Spanish Queen Sofía visited Indonesia, and inspected Spain's aid projects for reconstruction in Aceh and Nias after the destruction of the December 2004 Indian Ocean tsunami, also a nature conservation project in Gunung Leuser National Park. The queen visited Banda Aceh, Medan, Nias, and Jakarta to pay courtesy call to Indonesian President Susilo Bambang Yudhoyono. During her visit, the queen expressed her admiration and astonishment of how well Indonesia manages its country despite the enormous diversity of its people.

== Technology and defense cooperation ==
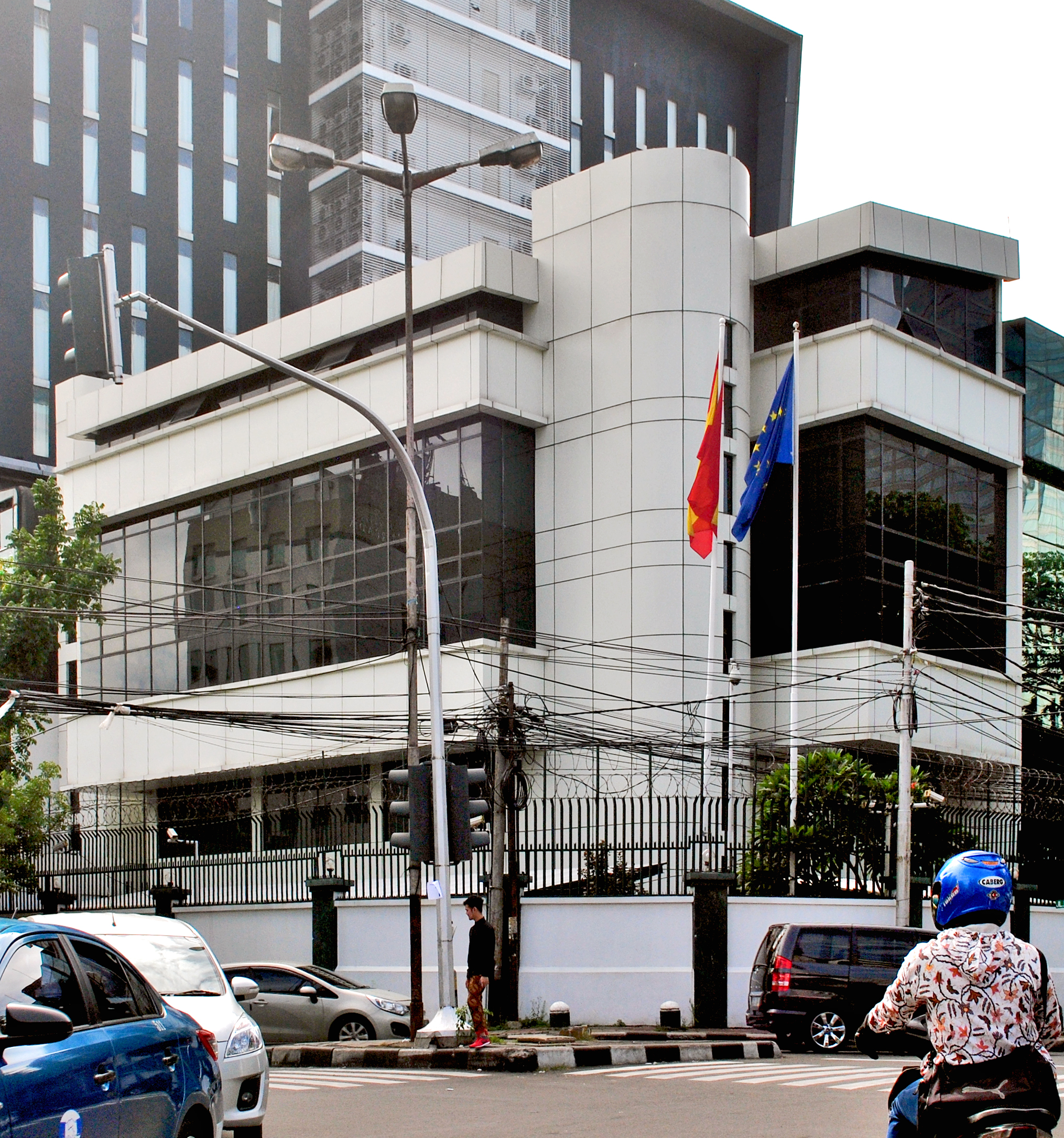
Embassy of Spain in Jakarta

Since the 1980s, Spain and Indonesia have embarked on strategic partnership in aeronautics technology, Spain's CASA and Indonesia's IPTN (formerly known as Nurtanio) co-designed and co-produced the CN-235 medium transport aircraft. Later Spain has developed it further into C-295 model and assigned Indonesia for its joint production and as distributor in Asian region, previously Indonesia has ordered nine C-295s. In 2013 Spain and Indonesia have signed a memorandum of understanding to improve the defense cooperation, which include education, planning, innovation, logistical support and acquisition of defense products.

== Economic relations ==
Total value of trade between two nations reached US$1.92 billion in 2008, US$2.08 billion in 2009, and US$2.18 billion in 2010. The balance of trade mostly in favour to Indonesia, with surpluses from the period 2005–2010, in 2009 Indonesia recorded US$1.58 billion surplus and US$1.62 billion surplus in 2010. Spain ranked the 14th place of Indonesia's export partners that buys coal, copper, palm oil, natural rubber, and electronics. On the other hand, Spain sells airplanes, aluminum, cigarette paper and pharmaceuticals to Indonesia.

Spain's investment in Indonesia is considered not to have reached its true potential since there are room to grow. In five years period (2005–2010), Spain's investment has reached the value of US$48.9 million in 17 projects, mainly on construction, chemical and pharmaceutical, transportation, logistics, storage and communications sectors, mostly located in Java and Bali.

== See also ==
- Foreign relations of Indonesia
- Foreign relations of Spain
