= Embassy of Ukraine, Madrid =

Embassy of Ukraine in Spain

Embassy of Ukraine in Spain
- Ukrainian Consular districts in Spain
- Location: Madrid
- Address: Ronda de la Abubilla 52
- Coordinates: 40.4555°N 3.6371°W
- Ambassador: Serhiy Pohorelzew since 2020.
- Website: Ukrainian Embassy in Madrid

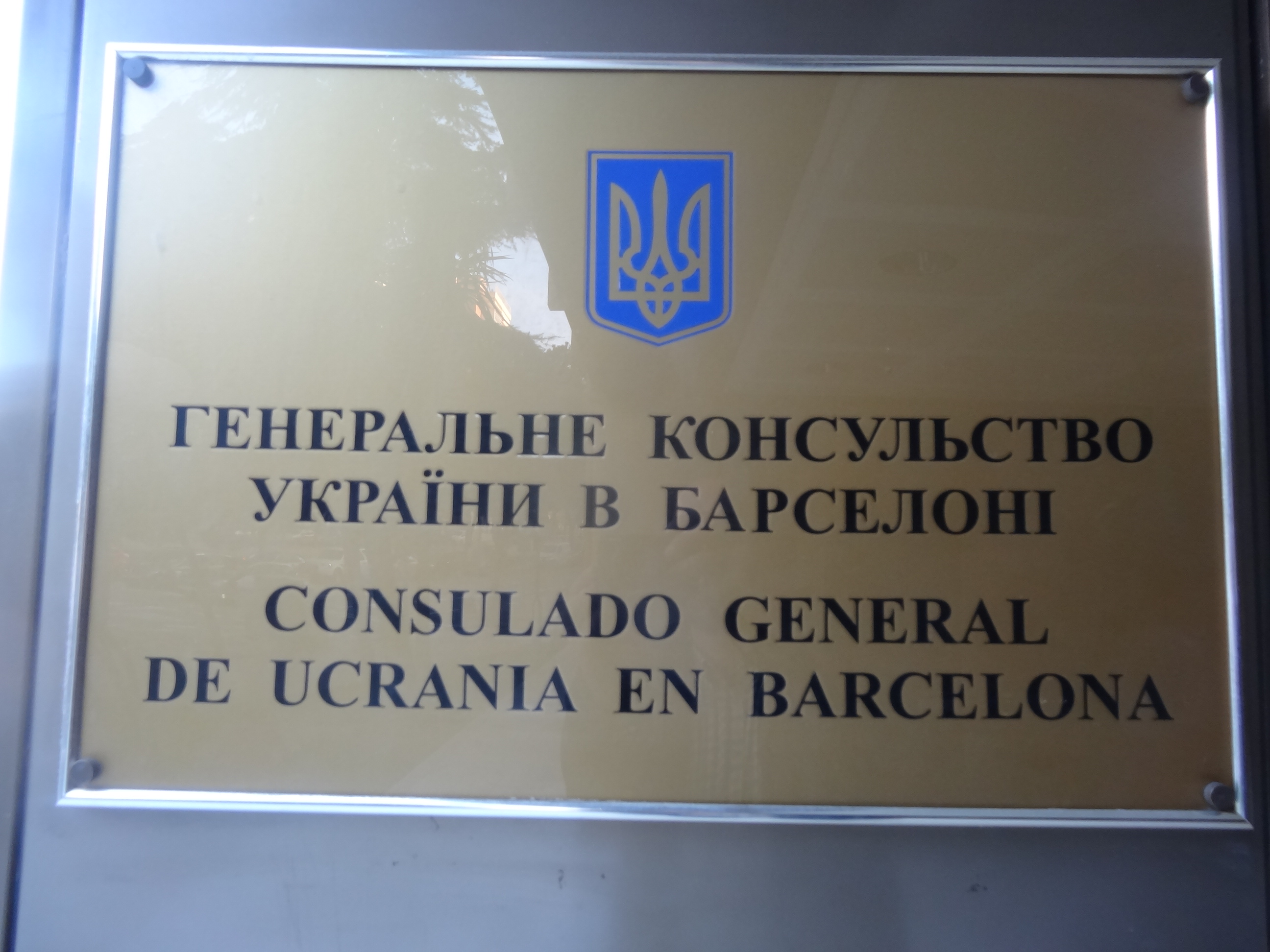
Consulate General of Ukraine in Barcelona

The Ukrainian Embassy in Madrid is the diplomatic mission of Ukraine in Spain. The embassy building is located at Ronda de la Abubilla 52 in Madrid. The Ukrainian ambassador to Spain has been Serhiy Pohorelzew since 2020.

== History ==
With the collapse of the Tsarist Empire in 1918, a Ukrainian nation-state emerged for the first time. The Kingdom of Spain recognized the Ukrainian state. Mykola Schrah was appointed Ukraine's first diplomatic representative in Spain in 1918. During the Russian Civil War, the Red Army conquered most of Ukraine, and it was incorporated into the Soviet Union as the Ukrainian Soviet Socialist Republic.

After the collapse of the Soviet Union, Ukraine declared itself independent in December 1991. Spain recognized Ukraine on December 31, 1991. Diplomatic relations were established on January 30, 1992, and the embassy in Madrid was opened in June 1995.

== Ambassador of Ukraine in Spain ==
- Mykola Illitsch Schrah (head of mission, 1918–?)
- Oleksandr Hnjedych (1995–1997)
- Oleksandr Taranenko (1997-2004)
- Oleh W Lassenko (2004-2006)
- Anatoly Shcherba (2006–2012)
- Volodymyr Krassilchuk (2012)
- Serhiy Pohorelzew (2012-2016)
- Anatoly Shcherba (2016-2020)
- Serhii Pohoreltsev(2020–)

== Explosion ==
Ukrainian Embassy Explosion
- Date: 30 November 2022
- Location: Embassy of Ukraine, Madrid
- Cause: Letter bomb
- Injuries: 1

An explosion occurred at the embassy on November 30, according to the Ministry of Interior. The Spanish National Police said an explosive device was triggered in a letter at the embassy, and they are investigating. The letter was addressed to Ambassador Serhii Pohoreltsev. A government official told the press that the explosion only caused a "very small wound on the ring finger of the right hand" of the security officer who opened it, and that the officer took himself to the hospital for treatment.

== See also ==
- Spain–Ukraine relations
- Foreign relations of Spain
- Foreign relations of Ukraine
- List of diplomatic missions in Spain
