= Adel Arnaout =

Lebanese immigrant

Adel Mohamed Arnaout (born 1970) is a Lebanese immigrant living in Toronto, Ontario, who was convicted of sending three letter bombs out to residents of the Greater Toronto area in August 2007. Found guilty also of 11 counts of attempted murder and considered to have 'little hope of rehabilitation', he was sentenced in 2012 to indefinite detention.

Some of the charges related to sending four cases of poisoned water to talent agencies, a bank and a judge. The water had been laced with the poisonous industrial solvent dimethyl sulfide.

The first recipient of the letter bomb was Abdelmagid Radi on August 11, who sustained minor injuries on opening the letter. The second bomb was sent to real estate lawyer Terrence Reiber on August 19, who called police after noticing a petroleum-type odour coming from the letter. Police destroyed the letter bomb. Reiber had represented Arnaout in a previous criminal matter. The third bomb was received by Guelph, Ontario building contractor John Becker on August 22. The device failed to explode. When residents complained about Arnaout, and he was eventually evicted, he wrongly blamed Becker.

Arnaout had a previous conviction for criminal harassment in April, 2003, for which he received a conditional discharge. The charge stemmed the harassing of managers of a Toronto modelling agency with which he had signed, hoping for a career as a model. When Arnaout failed to get any work as a model, he allegedly began calling the agency repeatedly and threatening them, claiming to be a member of the Russian mafia.

Police were already investigating Arnaout since June 2007 after harassment complaints by Toronto resident Steven Scott. Arnaout was wanted on an arrest warrant which had been was issued on June 26 charging him with criminal harassment of Scott, a former employer.

On August 30, 2007, Arnaout was taken into custody in connection to the letter bombs. At the time of his arrest, a rental car driven by him was found with 3 similar explosives inside. The Toronto Police bomb disposal unit did not defuse the explosives but instead transported them to the Leslie Street Spit where they were destroyed in a controlled explosion. The transport of the explosives by police closed the Don Valley Parkway and parts of the Gardiner Expressway for several hours. After his arrest, police also searched his rental apartment in an East York home, nicknamed the Bombay Bunker.

Police indicated the bombings were not due to racial or terrorist motives.

Arnaout faced three counts of attempted murder, three counts of attempt to cause an explosion, one count of illegal possession of explosives, and one count of criminal harassment.
