= Spain–Ukraine relations =

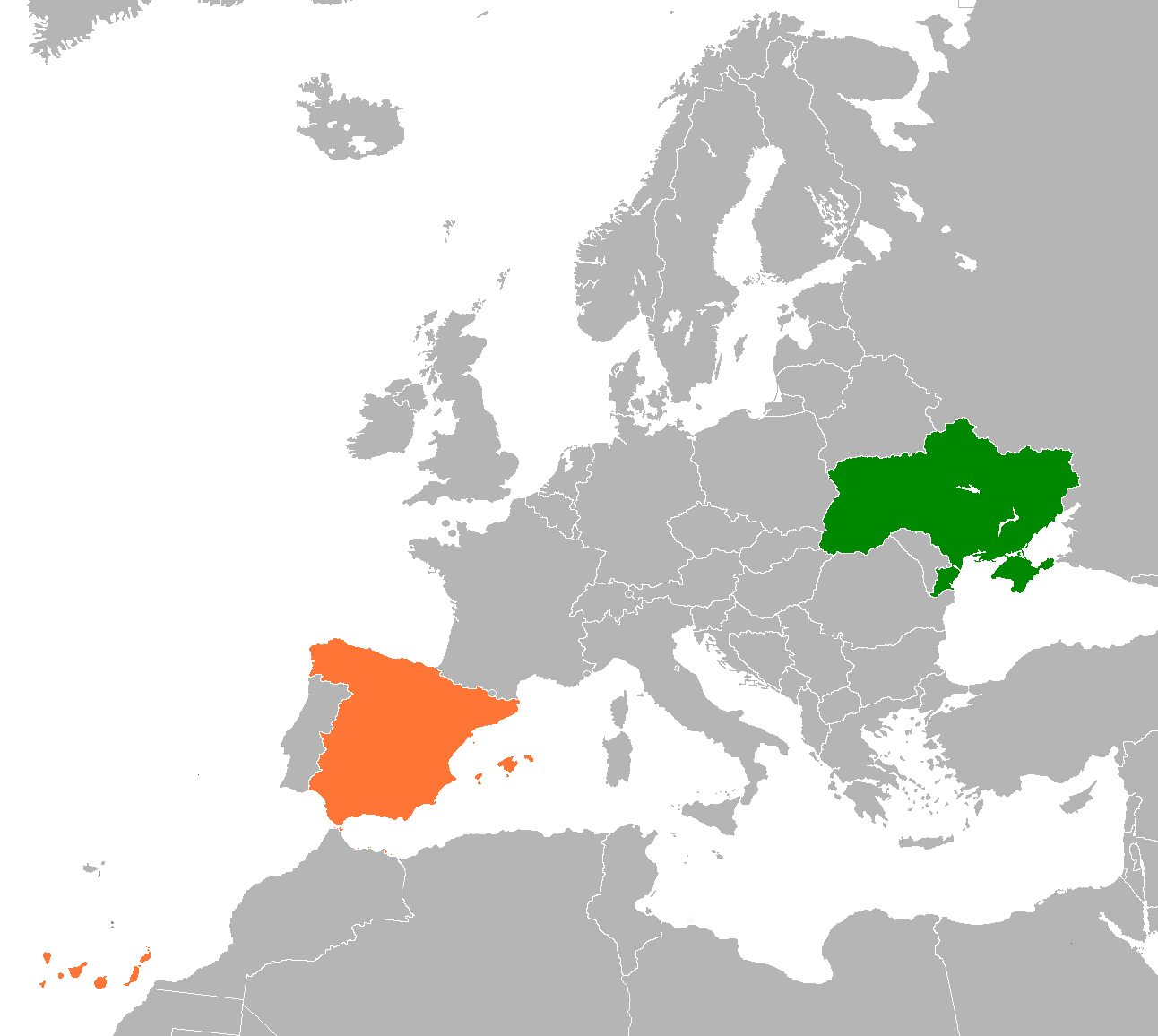
- Ukraine: Spain

Diplomatic mission
- Embassy of Spain, Kyiv: Embassy of Ukraine, Madrid

Relations between Spain and Ukraine were established in January 1992, some time after the Ukrainian independence. Spain is a member of NATO and the European Union, both of which Ukraine applied for in 2022. Both nations are members of the Council of Europe.

== History ==
=== Precedents ===
During the Thirty Years' War (1618-1648), the Ukrainian Cossacks participated on the side of the Spanish-Portuguese Catholic alliance against the Protestant coalition supported by the Tsardom of Russia and the Ottoman Empire.

During the Spanish Civil War (1936-1939), Ukrainian brigades recruited from the Western Communists fought on the Republican side. Spanish nationalists led by Franco were supported by former soldiers of Ukrainian People's Republic who lost their homeland in the fight against communism.

=== Diplomatic relations ===
Spain and Ukraine established formal diplomatic relations on 30 January 1992. Soon after, in February 1992, Spain opened a permanent diplomatic mission in Kyiv. Both countries signed a Treaty of Friendship and Cooperation which entered into force in August 1997.

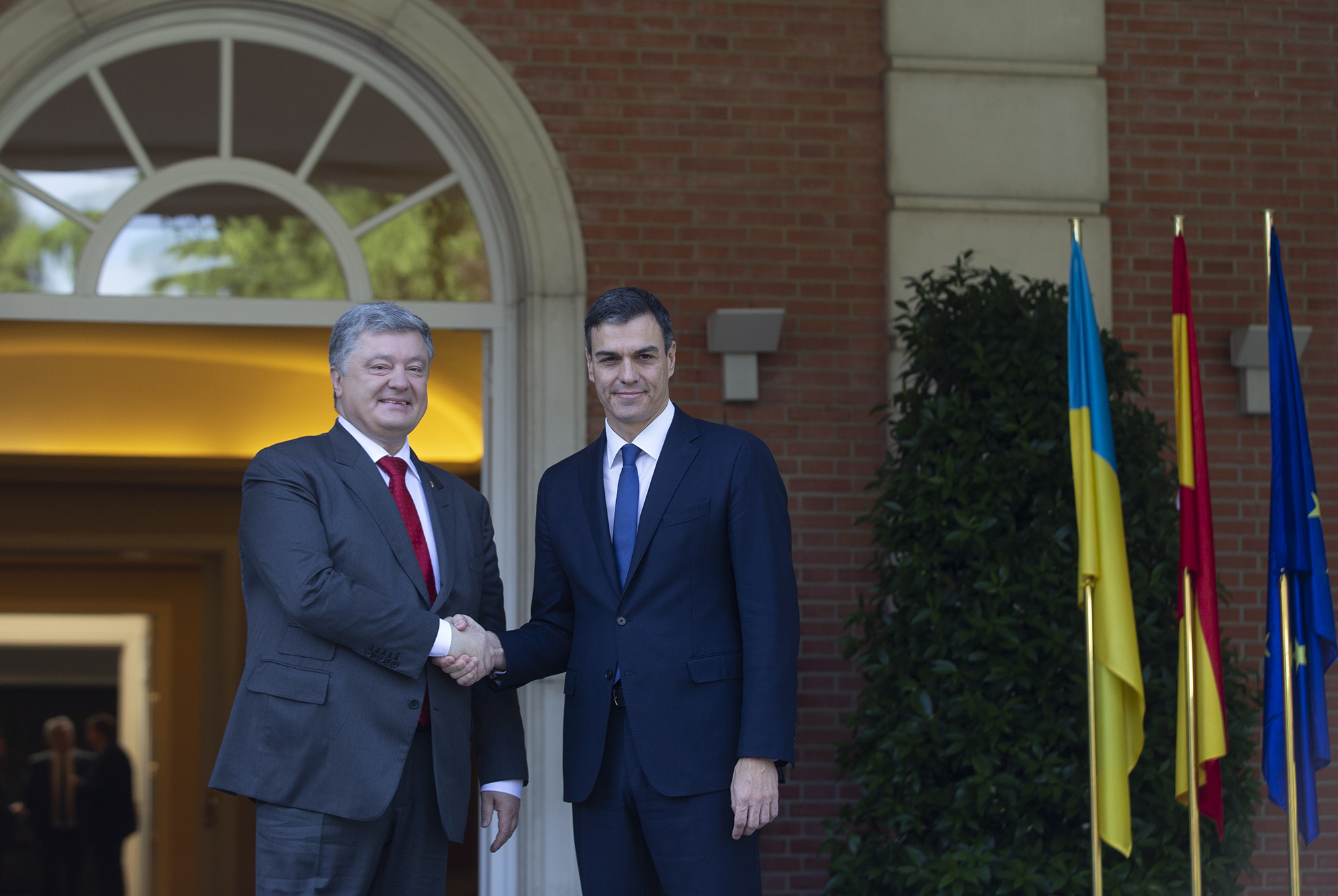
Ukrainian President Petro Poroshenko and Spanish Prime Minister Pedro Sánchez in La Moncloa during the first visit to Spain in June 2018.

Programs exist which welcome Ukrainian children in Spanish families during the period of school holidays and the presence of an important colony of Ukrainian citizens in Spain.

In 2020, the Spanish Ministry of Agriculture, Fisheries and Food and the Ukrainian Ministry of Economic Development, Trade and Agriculture signed a memorandum of understanding seeking to increase collaboration in the scope of agriculture and food industry.

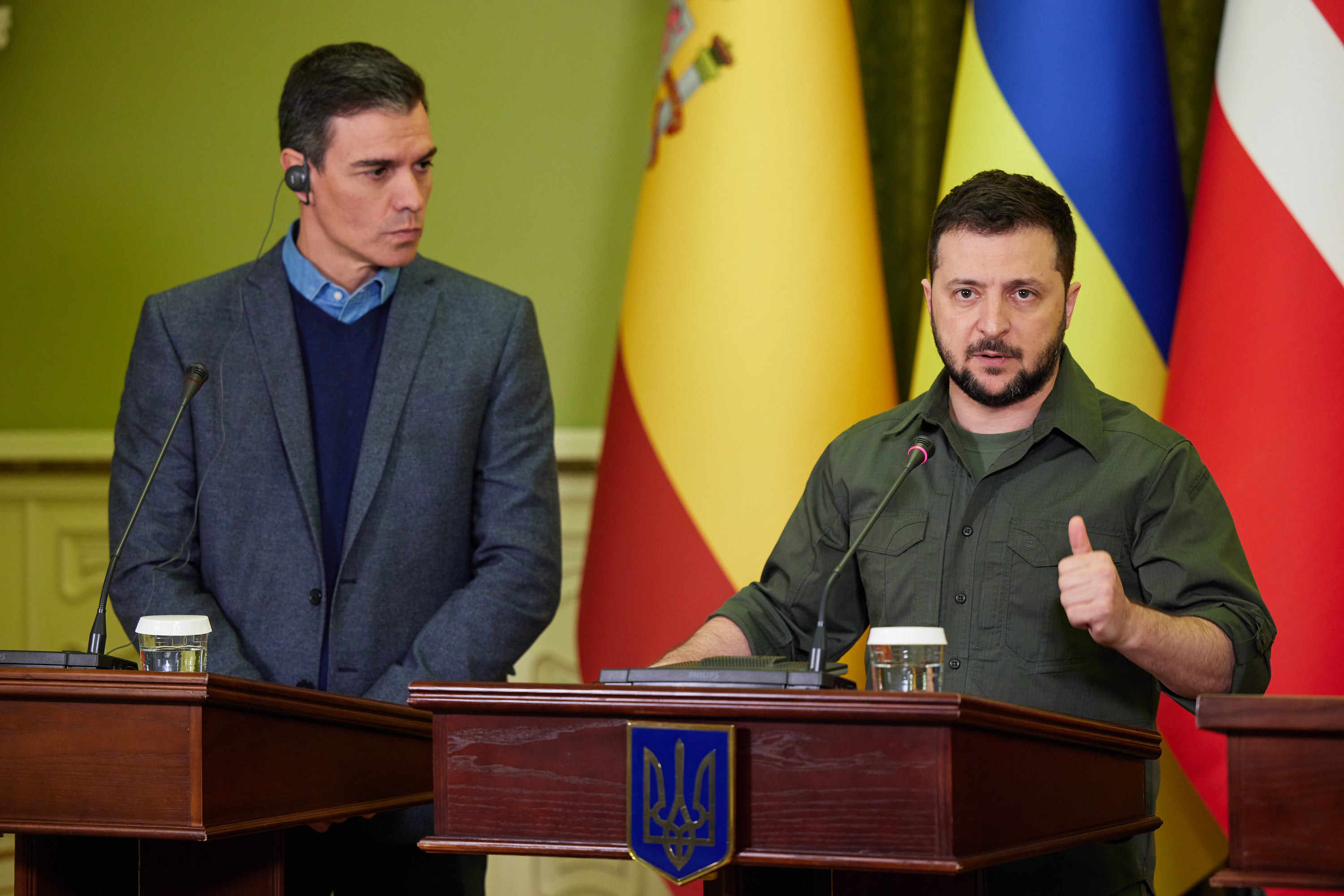
Sánchez visiting Ukrainian President Volodymyr Zelenskyy alongside Spanish Prime Minister Pedro Sánchez during the Russian invasion of Ukraine, on 21 April 2022

In January 2022, amid the 2021–2022 Russo-Ukrainian crisis, Spanish prime minister Pedro Sánchez asserted Spanish support to the "sovereignty and territorial integrity" of Ukraine. On 21 February 2022, Sánchez "condemned" the Russian recognition of LPR and DPR, promising a coordinated response alongside Spain's partners.

On 25 February 2022, after the 24 February all-out Russian invasion of Ukraine, the last remaining staff from the Spanish embassy in Kyiv (diplomatic service and GEO agents charged with the security) left in a convoy headed to the west of Ukraine. In addition to humanitary aid, the Spanish Government approved the delivery of batches of lethal aid to Ukraine, including 1,370 anti-tank rocket-propelled grenade launchers. The Spanish Ministry of Inclusion, Social Security and Migration enabled reception, attention and relocation centres (CREADE) for Ukrainian refugees in Pozuelo de Alarcón, Barcelona, Alicante and Málaga, resolving around 40,000 applications for temporary protection over the course of the first three weeks of the conflict. During a video conference delivered before the Spanish Congress of Deputies, Ukrainian president Volodymyr Zelenskyy thanked Spanish companies who had stopped doing business in Russia while calling reluctant companies Maxam Explosives, Porcelanosa and Sercobe to do the same.

On 18 April 2022, Spanish prime minister Pedro Sánchez announced the imminent reopening of the embassy in Kyiv. On 21 April, Sánchez travelled to Kyiv, meeting with Zelenskyy and announcing the dispatch of the largest batch of weapons to Ukraine to date, with over 200 tonnes of military hardware in route to Poland in the Ysabel (A-06) ship. The Spanish embassy in Kyiv reopened on 22 April 2022.

On 30 November 2022, an employee working at the Ukrainian embassy in Madrid was injured when a letter (reportedly intended for Ukrainian ambassador Serhil Pohoreltsev) that they were handling exploded.

== Economic relations ==
The bilateral Ukraine–Spain trade figures have been increasing since the mid-2008 crisis. The Spanish trade balance with Ukraine registers a traditional deficit. In 2014 the trade deficit stood at €884 M, somewhat higher than 2013, which was €687M. This was mainly due to a 32% drop in Spanish exports to Ukraine due to the deep economic crisis that the country was going through. Both quantitatively reduced exports and imports represent a small percentage of Spain's total foreign trade. In 2014, Ukraine was ranked 61 as a buyer in Spain and 45 as a seller to it.

== Cooperation ==
Ukraine is not a priority country in the Master Plan of Spanish Cooperation. However, there are some cooperation programs in different social fields, as well as specific decentralized cooperation projects. The Spanish Administration is currently running several twinning programs of the EU in Ukraine.

== Sporting agreements ==
On 5 October 2022, the Royal Spanish Football Federation (RFEF) and Portuguese Football Federation (FPF) announced the addition of Ukraine to the Spain-Portugal joint bid for FIFA World Cup 2030.

== Declarations, treaties and agreements ==
- Agreement on International Road Transport, signed on June 16, 1995 and in force since March 7, 2000.
- Air Transport Agreement, signed on October 7, 1996 and effective as of April 22, 1997.
- Social Security Agreement, signed on October 7, 1996 and in force since March 27, 1998.
- Agreement on Economic and Industrial Cooperation, signed on October 7, 1996 and in force since April 12, 2000.
- Agreement on Cultural and Educational Cooperation, signed on October 7, 1996 and in force since January 13, 1997 and in force since January 13, 1997.
- Treaty of Friendship and Cooperation, signed on October 8, 1996 and in force since August 20, 1997.
- Agreement for the Promotion and Reciprocal Protection of Investments (APPRI), signed on February 26, 1998 and effective as of May 5, 2000.
- Memorandum of Understanding on Financial Cooperation, signed in 1997;
- Agreement of Technical Scientific Cooperation, signed in 2001.
- Administrative agreement for the application of the Social Security Agreement, signed on January 17, 2001
- Agreement to avoid Double Taxation, concluded in 1985, and in force since 1986, when the current Ukraine was part of the former Soviet Union.
- Ukraine wishes to conclude a new, independent agreement whose negotiations began in 2006.
- Agreement on Regular Migration Flows between Spain and Ukraine, signed on May 12, 2009 and pending its ratification by the Ukrainian parliament.
- Driving license swap agreement, signed on January 11, 2010.
- Memorandum of cooperation in International Maritime Transport, signed on January 11, 2010.
- Agreement on reciprocal protection of classified information, signed in Kyiv on February 10, 2015.

== Resident diplomatic missions ==
- Spain has an embassy in Kyiv.
- Ukraine has an embassy in Madrid, a consulate-general in Barcelona and a consulate in Málaga.
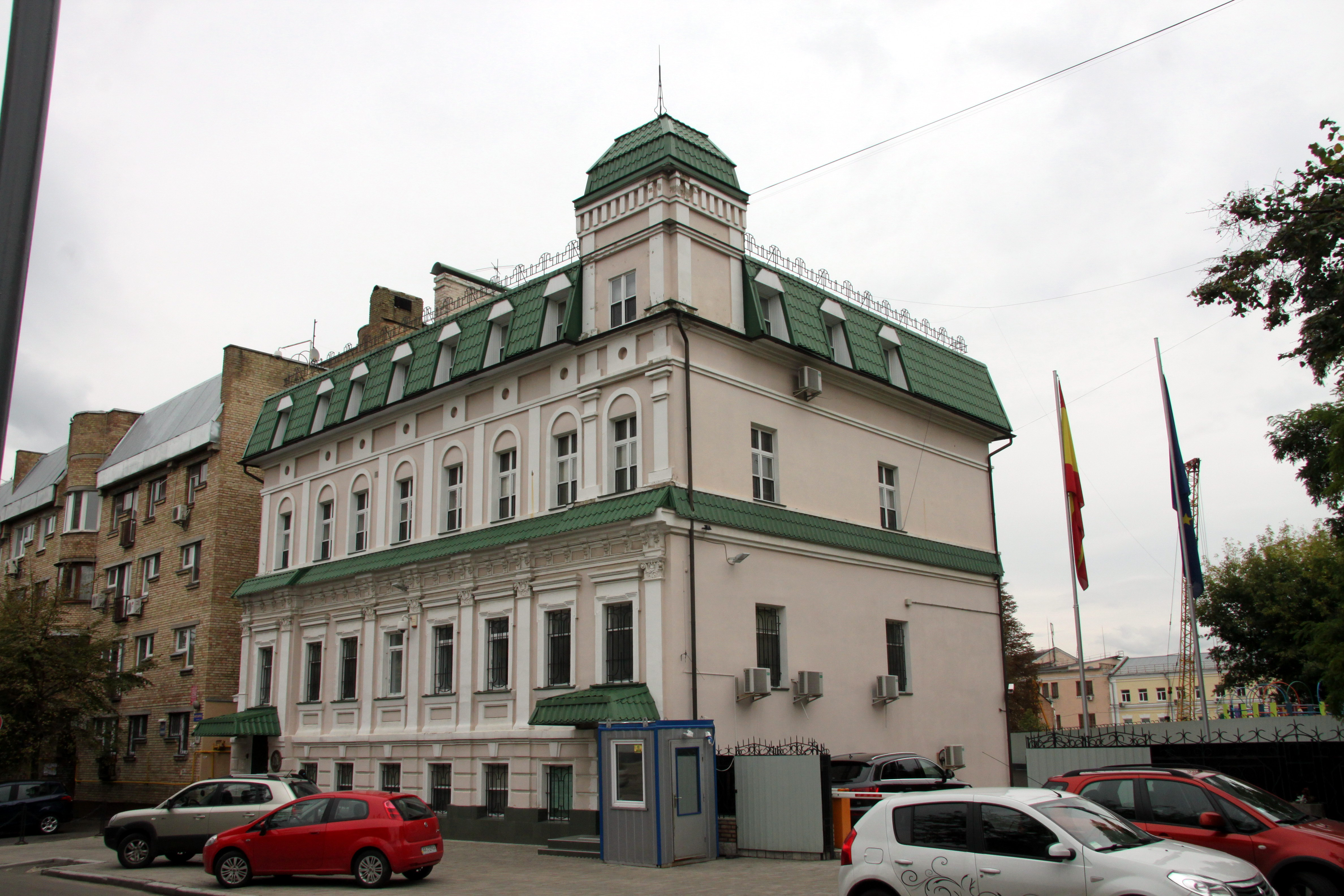
Embassy of Spain in Kyiv

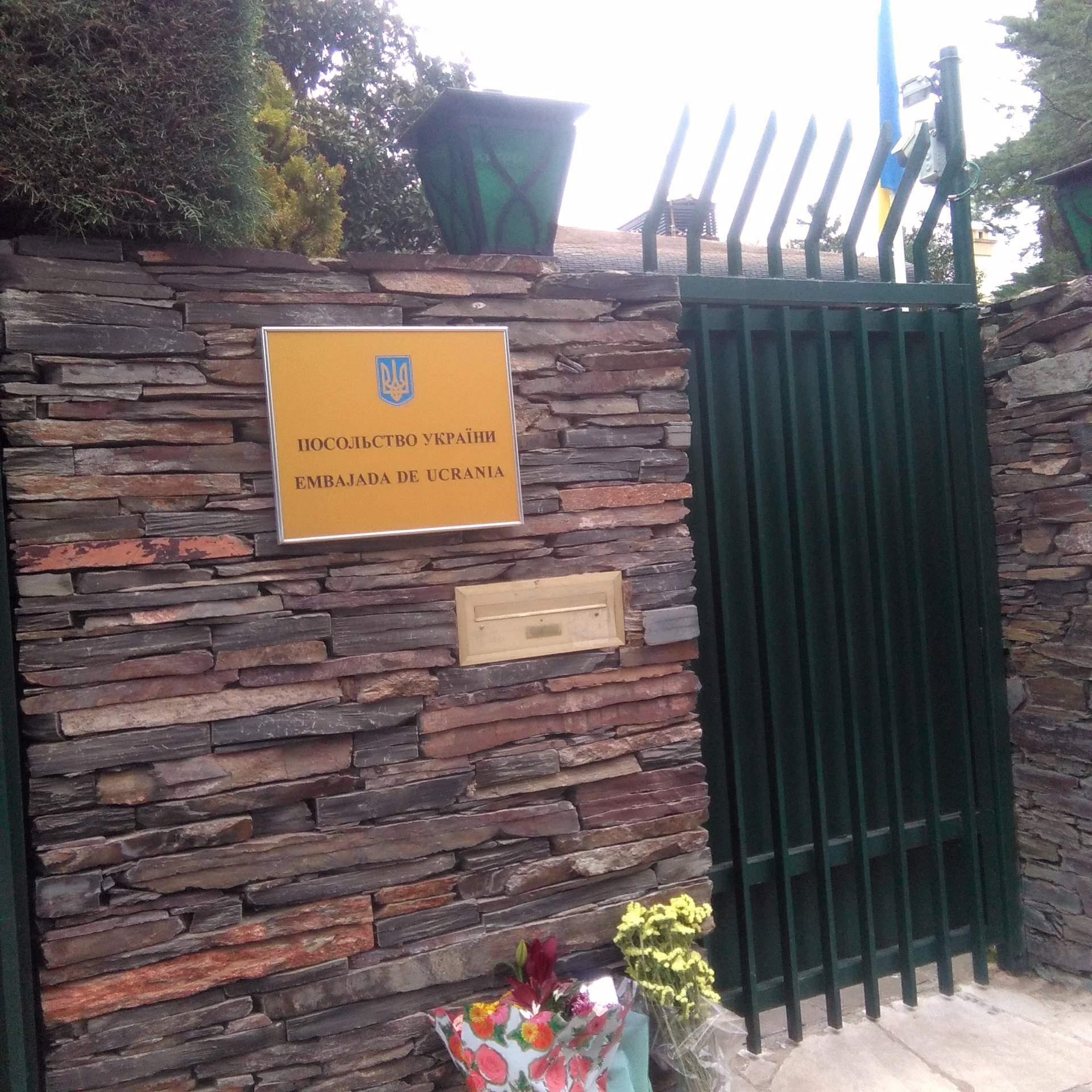
Embassy of Ukraine in Madrid

== See also ==
- Foreign relations of Spain
- Foreign relations of Ukraine
