= Nana Yuliana =

Indonesian diplomat (born 1963)

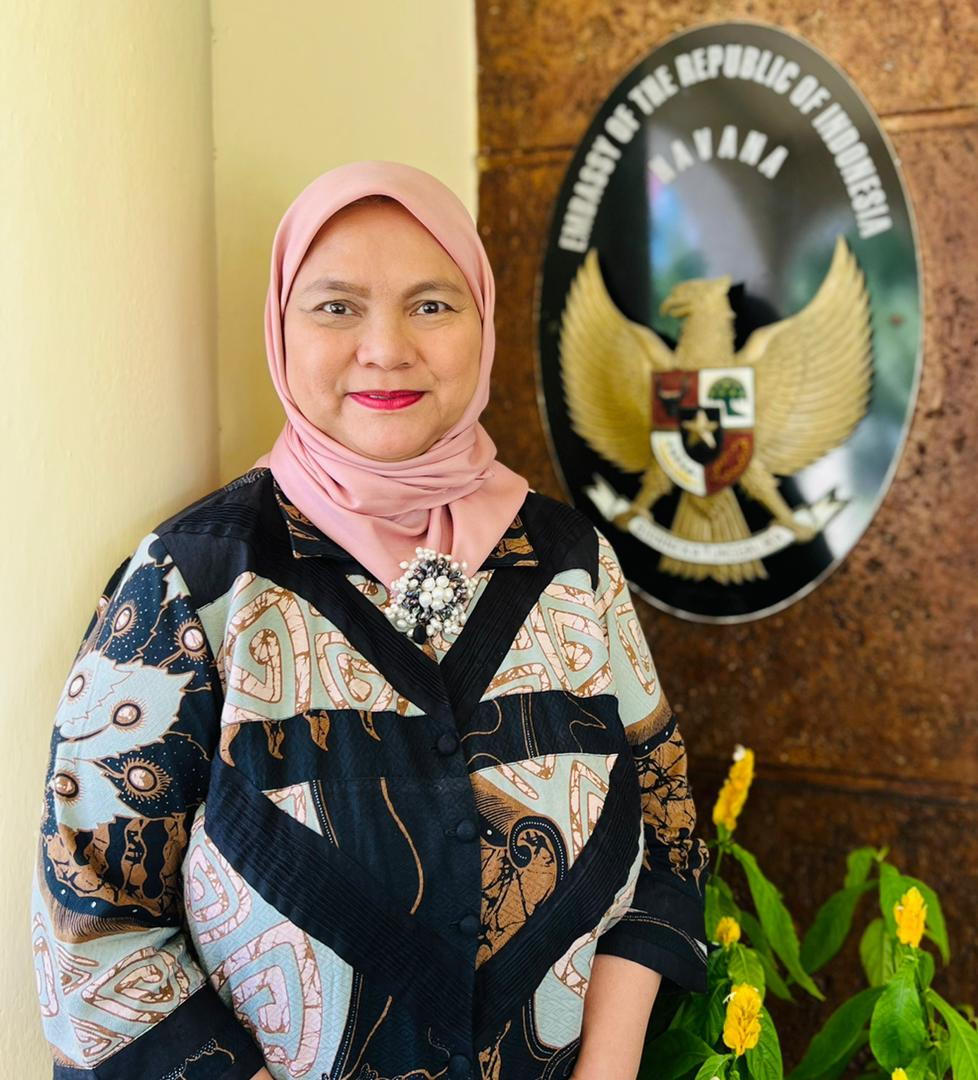

Ambassador of Indonesia to Cuba
- In office 26 October 2020 – 27 February 2025
- President: Joko Widodo; Prabowo Subianto
- Preceded by: Alfred Tanduk Palembangan
- Succeeded by: Simon Soekarno

Personal details
- Born: 5 July 1963 (age 62) Jakarta, Indonesia
- Spouse: Imam Bogie Yudhaswara
- Children: 2
- Education: Jakarta's Teacher Institute (Drs.); Macquarie University (MA); University of Indonesia (M.Si.); University of Santo Tomas (PhD)

Nana Yuliana (born 5 July 1963) is an Indonesian diplomat who served as ambassador to Cuba, with concurrent accreditation to Bahamas, Jamaica, Haiti, and the Dominican Republic from 2020 to 2025. She previously served as director of the foreign service school from 2014 to 2017 and consul general in Houston from 2017 to 2020. She is the first woman to become Indonesia's ambassador in Cuba.

== Early life and education ==
Born on 5 July 1963 in Jakarta, Yuliana completed her secondary education in science, at Jakarta's 3rd state high school, graduating in 1981. She then attended Jakarta's Teacher Institute, where she earned a degree in English education in 1986. Following her undergraduate studies, she taught linguistics as an English literature lecturer at the Universitas Nasional in Jakarta. She continued her education abroad, obtaining her master's degree in applied linguistics from Macquarie University between 1992 and 1993. She completed her second master's degree in international relations from the University of Indonesia in 2000. During her posting in the Philippines, she completed her doctoral program in development studies at the University of Santo Tomas in 2005.

== Career ==
Upon returning to Indonesia after completing her master's degree, Yuliana applied to and was accepted as a civil servant at the foreign department. She had to balance raising two children and participating in the basic diplomatic program—which was a collaboration with Universitas Indonesia—while simultaneously continue lecturing at the Universitas Nasional. In the Universitas Nasional she served as the first deputy dean of the literature faculty, responsible for academic affairs, and ultimately as the dean until he had to left Jakarta for overseas posting in 2001.

Yuliana's first overseas posting in 2001 was in Manila, where she was assigned to the embassy's political section with the rank of third secretary. During this time, Indonesia was a member of the Organization of Islamic Cooperation (OIC) Committee of 8 in the Philippines, tasked with monitoring the implementation of the 1996 Peace Agreement between the Philippine government and the Moro National Liberation Front (MNLF). She was required to visit the Mindanao region several times to help monitor the agreement's implementation before reporting the findings to the OIC Session in Jeddah.

Following her assignment in the Philippines, Yuliana was posted to the economic section to the embassy in Bangkok from 2008 to 2012, where she served as the alternate representative of Indonesia to the United Nations Economic and Social Commission for Asia and the Pacific. After her tenure in Bangkok, she returned to serve as the director of the foreign ministry's mid-level diplomatic training, where she trained young diplomats, combining her passion for education and diplomacy under the slogan EduDiplomacy.

Yuliana assumed duties as consul general in Houston on 10 August 2017. He was responsible for consular services for Indonesians in ten states, ranging from New Mexico to Florida and two territories, Puerto Rico and the US Virgin Islands. Her work in Houston focused on enhancing the strategic partnership between Indonesia and the United States, including securing the renewal of Indonesia's Generalized System of Preference (GSP) status and promoting strong cooperation in the energy sector, including oil, gas, and renewable energy. Aside from her diplomatic duties, Yuliana also taught international relations master students at the Paramadina University via online learning.

On 19 March 2020, Nana was nominated by President Joko Widodo as ambassador to Cuba, with concurrent accreditation to Bahamas, Jamaica, Haiti, and the Dominican Republic. Upon passing the House of Representative's first commission assessmentin June, she was installed on 26 October 2020. She officially received duties from her predecessor, Alfred Tanduk Palembangan on 24 December 2020. Shortly following her appointment, she stated her priorities as ambassadors include increasing cooperation in the fields of medicine, genetic engineering, biotechnology, sports, and education, as well as boosting Indonesian exports to the region. She presented her credentials to President of Cuba Miguel Díaz-Canel on 5 January 2021, Foreign Minister of Haiti Claude Joseph on 24 February 2021, Foreign Affairs and Trade Minister of Jamaica Kamina Johnson Smith on 21 October 2021, President of the Dominican Republic Luis Abinader on 21 April 2022, and Governor-General of the Bahamas Cornelius A. Smith on 13 June 2022. She ended her ambassadorial tenure on 27 February 2025.

After retiring from foreign service, Nana continued teaching English at the Universitas Nasional. On 23 June 2025, she became the dean of the university's faculty of linguistics and literature.

== Personal life ==
Nana Yuliana is married to Imam Bogie Yudhaswara and has two children.
