= Alfred Tanduk Palembangan =

Indonesian diplomat (born 1955)

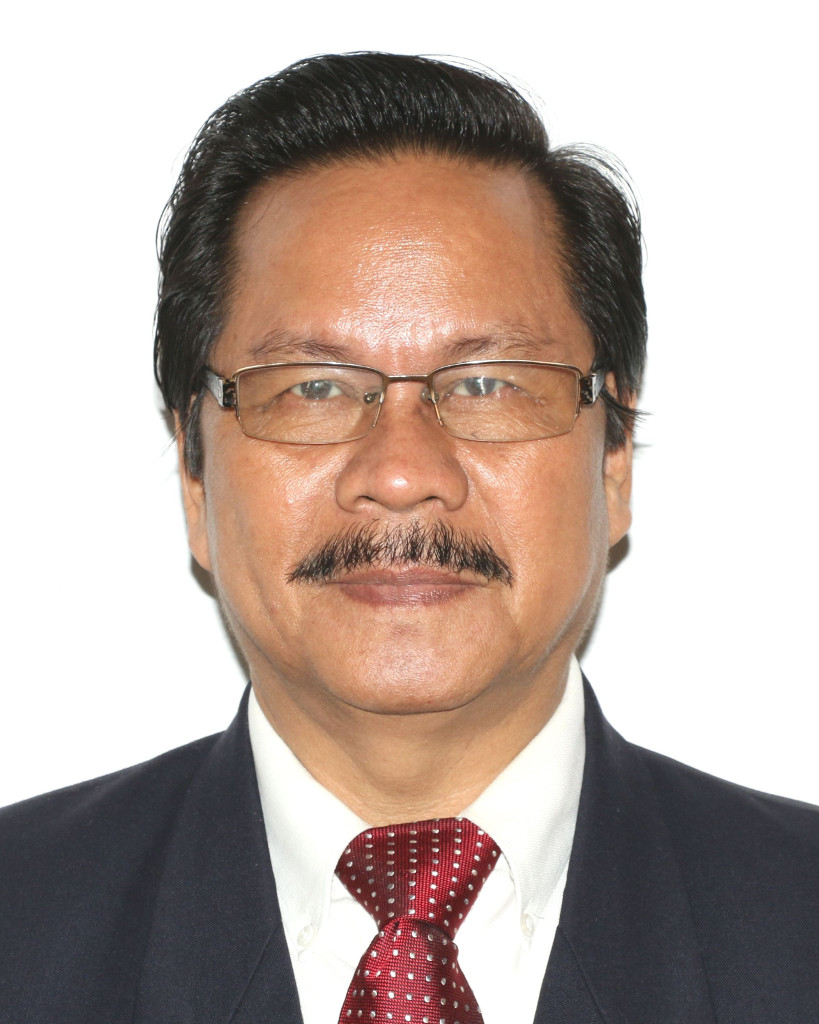

Ambassador of Indonesia to Cuba, the Bahamas, Dominican Republic, Haiti, and Jamaica
- In office 25 February 2016 – 24 December 2020
- President: Joko Widodo
- Preceded by: Teiseran Foun Cornelis
- Succeeded by: Nana Yuliana

Ambassador of Indonesia to Venezuela
- In office 27 December 2007 – 2011
- President: Susilo Bambang Yudhoyono
- Preceded by: Cornelis Manoppo
- Succeeded by: Prianti Gagarin Djatmiko Singgih

Personal details
- Born: 10 March 1955 (age 71) Sa'dan, Tana Toraja, Indonesia
- Spouse: Rahelinewice Mangiri
- Children: 3
- Parents: Paulus Tandian (father); Martina Kaban (mother)
- Education: Hasanuddin University (S.H.)

Alfred Tanduk Palembangan (born 10 March 1955) is an Indonesian diplomat who served as ambassador to a number of Latin American and Caribbean states. He served as ambassador to Venezuela with concurrent accreditation to Dominica, Grenada, Saint Lucia, Saint Vincent and the Grenadines, and Trinidad and Tobago from 2007 to 2011 and ambassador to Cuba with concurrent accreditation to the Bahamas, Haiti, and Jamaica from 2016 to 2020.

== Early life and education ==
Born in Sa'dan, Tana Toraja, on 10 March 1955, Palembangan is the youngest of five siblings born to Paulus Tandian, the village chief of Bo'batu in Sa'dan Matallo, and Martina Kaban. He attended the Rantepao Catholic High School from 1972 to 1974, during which he was inspired to become a diplomat after interacting with tourists. A foreign missionary priest at his school encouraged him to learn a foreign language and gifted him an English dictionary on the condition that he would become fluent. Upon completing high school he briefly studied economics at Hasanuddin University for one semester before transferring to the law faculty at same university. During his studies, Palembangan joined the Union of Catholic University Students of the Republic of Indonesia. He received his bachelor's degree in mid-1980, becoming the first to graduate from his class of 1975.

In October 1980, after graduating with a law degree, Palembangan moved to Jakarta and applied selectively to various private companies and government agencies, including the education and culture department, the justice department, the foreign department, and Bank Negara Indonesia. He was accepted to teach at different state universities, but he reluctantly declined the offer as he was not allowed to teach at his alma mater on the grounds of ensuring equal distribution of experience. Around the same time, he took tests for both the foreign department and justice department, successfully passing for both in January and June 1981, respectively. Although many family members wished for him to become a judge, his brother-in-law, M.P. Mangiri, strongly encouraged him to pursue a diplomatic career, viewing it as a noble profession and warning of the ethical pitfalls potentially faced by judges. This advice deeply influenced Palembangan, especially as his brother-in-law passed away the day after giving the counsel.

== Diplomatic career ==
Palembangan officially began his diplomatic service in March 1981. He began his career as a staff at the organization bureau within the foreign department's secretariat general. Upon completing his basic diplomatic education in 1983, he was assigned to the planning bureau of the secretariat general. He received his first overseas posting as an intern at the permanent mission in New York from 1984 to 1985.

From 1985 to 1988, he was posted as the chief of political, information, and socio-cultural subdivision at the embassy in Caracas, Venezuela. Upon returning, he served as chief of the South America II section at the foreign department's directorate general of politics from 1988 to 1991. He returned to an overseas posting as chief of information and socio-cultural subdivision at the embassy in Santiago, Chile, with the rank of second secretary from 1991 to 1996. From 1996 to 1999, he became assistant inspector for personnel affairs within the foreign department. During this period, he undertook mid-level diplomatic education in 1996 and senior diplomatic education in 1997.

His next foreign assignment was as chief of the political, information, and socio-cultural section at the embassy in Buenos Aires, Argentina, from 1999 to 2003. Following reorganizations within the foreign department, the directorate general of politics was split into several regional directorate generals, and Palembangan was appointed as the deputy director (chief of subdirectorate) of South America and Caribbean within the directorate general of America and Europe in 2003. The subdirectorate was upgraded into a directorate, and on 31 August 2004 Palembangan became the director of South America and the Caribbean.

On 27 December 2007, Palembangan was installed as ambassador to Venezuela, with concurrent accreditation to Southern Caribbean countries. (Note: It is unclear regarding the accreditation for Palembangan as ambassador in Caracas. Detik reported that he was accredited to Bolivia, Grenada, and Dominica, while Antara reported that he was accredited to Bolivia, Venezuela, and St. Vincent and Grenadines. An archived version of the embassy's website in 2010 stated that he was concurrently accredited to Trinidad and Tobago, Grenada, Saint Lucia, Dominica, and St. Vincent and Grenadines.) He served as ambassador until 2011 and was appointed as the secretary of the foreign department's policy assessment and development agency. On 6 August 2015, Palembangan was nominated as ambassador to Cuba, with concurrent accreditation to the Bahamas, Dominican Republic, Haiti, and Jamaica. After undergoing an assessment by the House of Representatives's first commission on 14 September 2015, Palembangan was installed on 25 February 2016. He presented his credentials to the Vice President of Cuba Salvador Valdés Mesa on 25 May 2016, Governor-General of Jamaica Sir Patrick Allen on 8 September 2016, Governor-General of the Bahamas Marguerite Pindling on 20 October 2016, President of Haiti Jocelerme Privert on 20 January 2017, and President of the Dominican Republic Danilo Medina on 20 July 2017. He ended his ambassadorial duties upon hand over to his successor, Nana Yuliana, on 24 December 2020.

== Personal life ==
Palembangan is married to Rahelinewice Mangiri and has three children.
