= Letter bomb =

Terrorism method

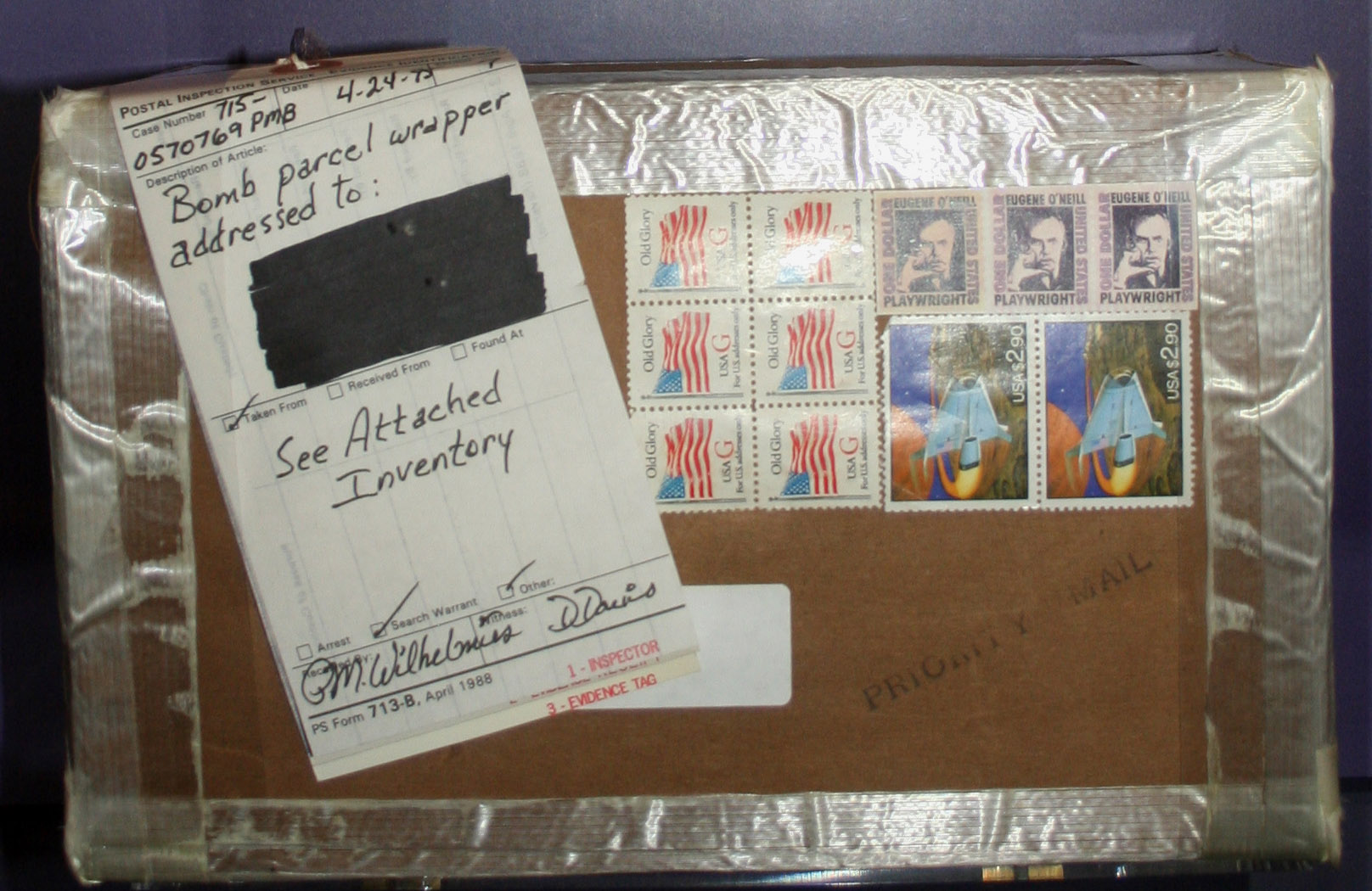
A mail bomb on display at the National Postal Museum

A letter bomb (Note: Alternative names include parcel bomb, mail bomb, package bomb, note bomb, message bomb, gift bomb, present bomb, delivery bomb, surprise bomb, postal bomb, and post bomb.) is an explosive device sent via the postal service, and designed with the intention to injure or kill the recipient when opened. They have been used in terrorist attacks such as those of the Unabomber. Some countries have agencies whose duties include the interdiction of letter bombs and the investigation of letter bombings. The letter bomb may have been in use for nearly as long as the common postal service has been in existence, as far back as 1764 (see Examples).

== Description ==
Letter bombs are usually designed to explode immediately on opening, with the intention of seriously injuring or killing the recipient (who may or may not be the person to whom the bomb was addressed). A related threat is mail containing unidentified powders or chemicals, as in the 2001 anthrax attacks.

== Use by suffragettes ==
One of, if not the first, groups to consistently use letter bombs on a wide scale were the British suffragettes of the Women's Social and Political Union in the years before the First World War. The group were the original inventors of a form of letter bomb designed to maim or kill politicians or opponents. In 1913, numerous letter bombs were sent to politicians such as the Chancellor David Lloyd George and Prime Minister H.H. Asquith, but they invariably all exploded in post offices, post boxes or in mailbags while in transit across the country. Suffragettes also once attempted to assassinate an anti-women's suffrage judge, Sir Henry Curtis-Bennett, with a letter-bomb made partly out of bullets, but the bomb was intercepted by London postal workers before it could reach him.

== Patentability ==
Letter-bombs, along with anti-personnel mines, are typical examples of subject-matter excluded from patentability under the European Patent Convention, because the publication or exploitation of such inventions are contrary to the "ordre public" and/or morality (Article 53(a) EPC).

== Examples ==
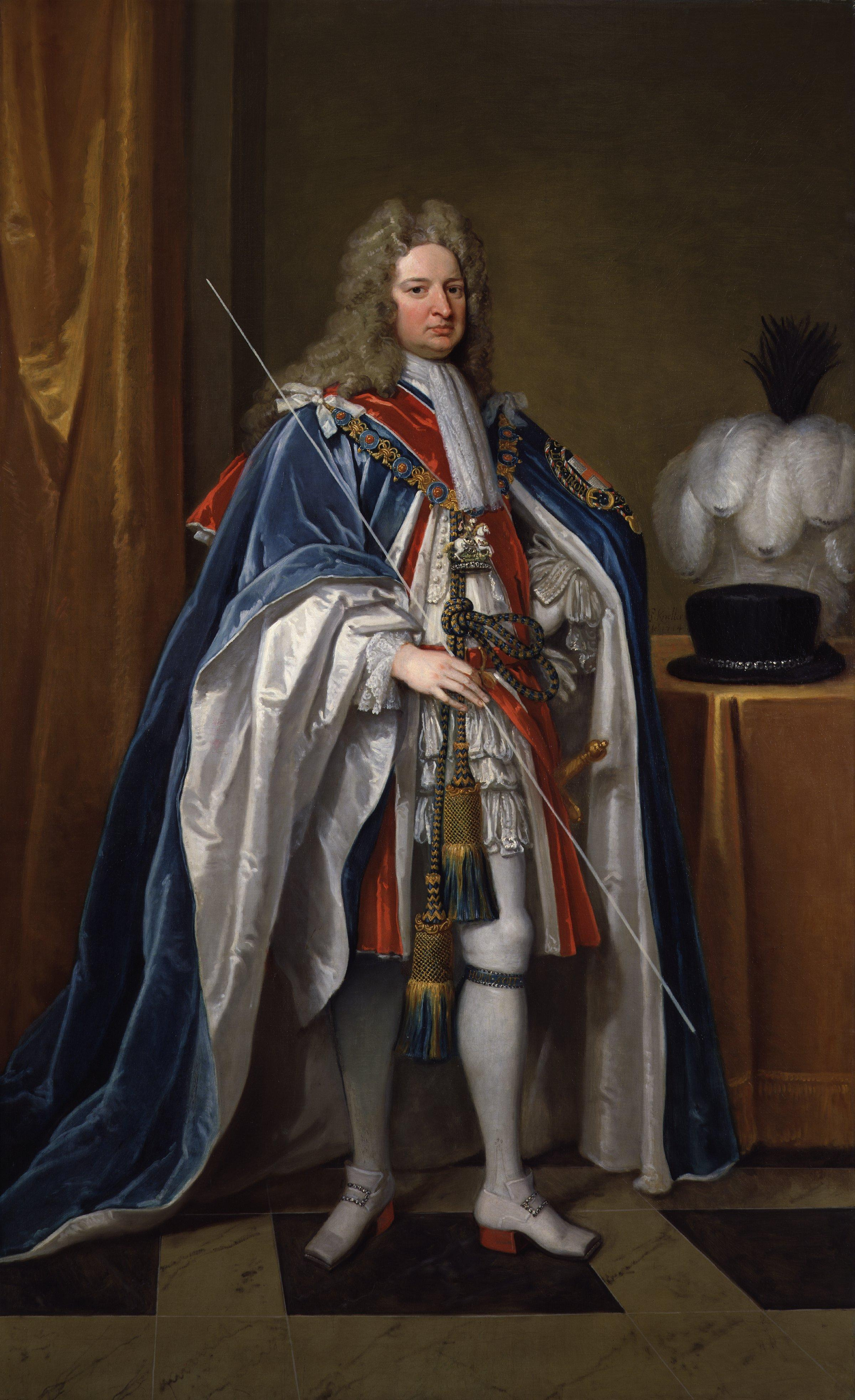
Robert Harley was targeted in one of the earliest modern parcel bombing incidents

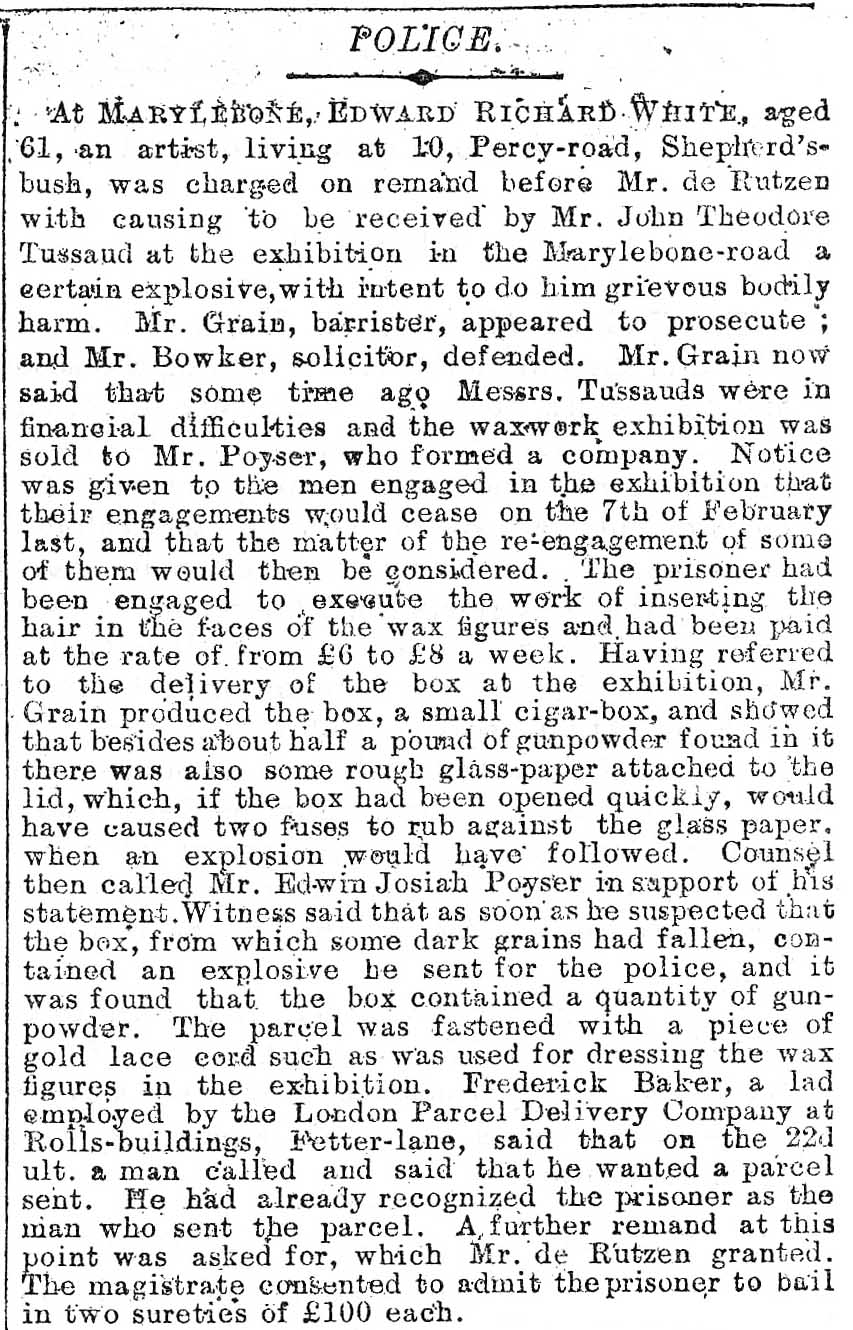
Parcel bomb sent to Madame Tussauds in 1889

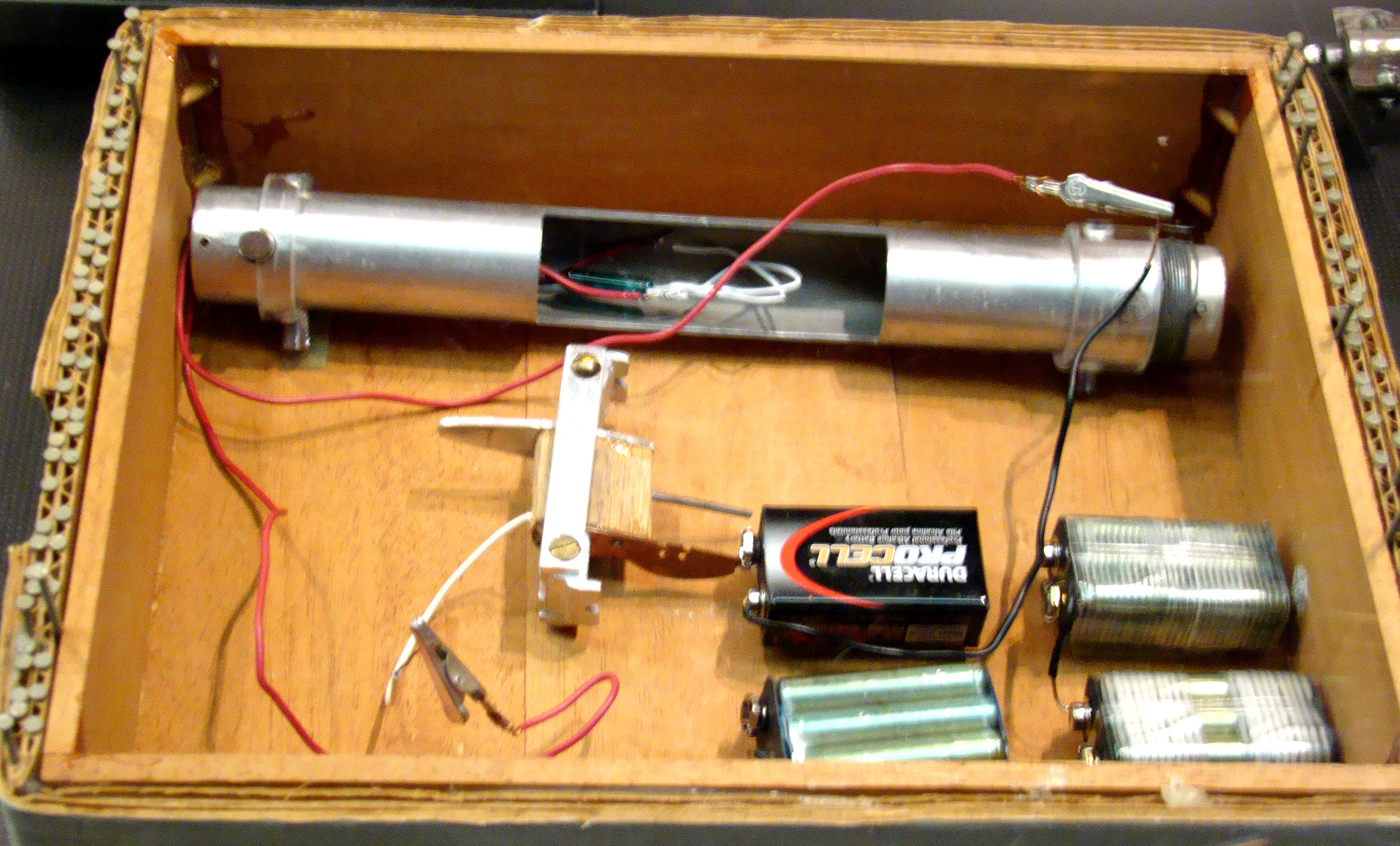
FBI reproduction of one of Theodore Kaczynski's bombs

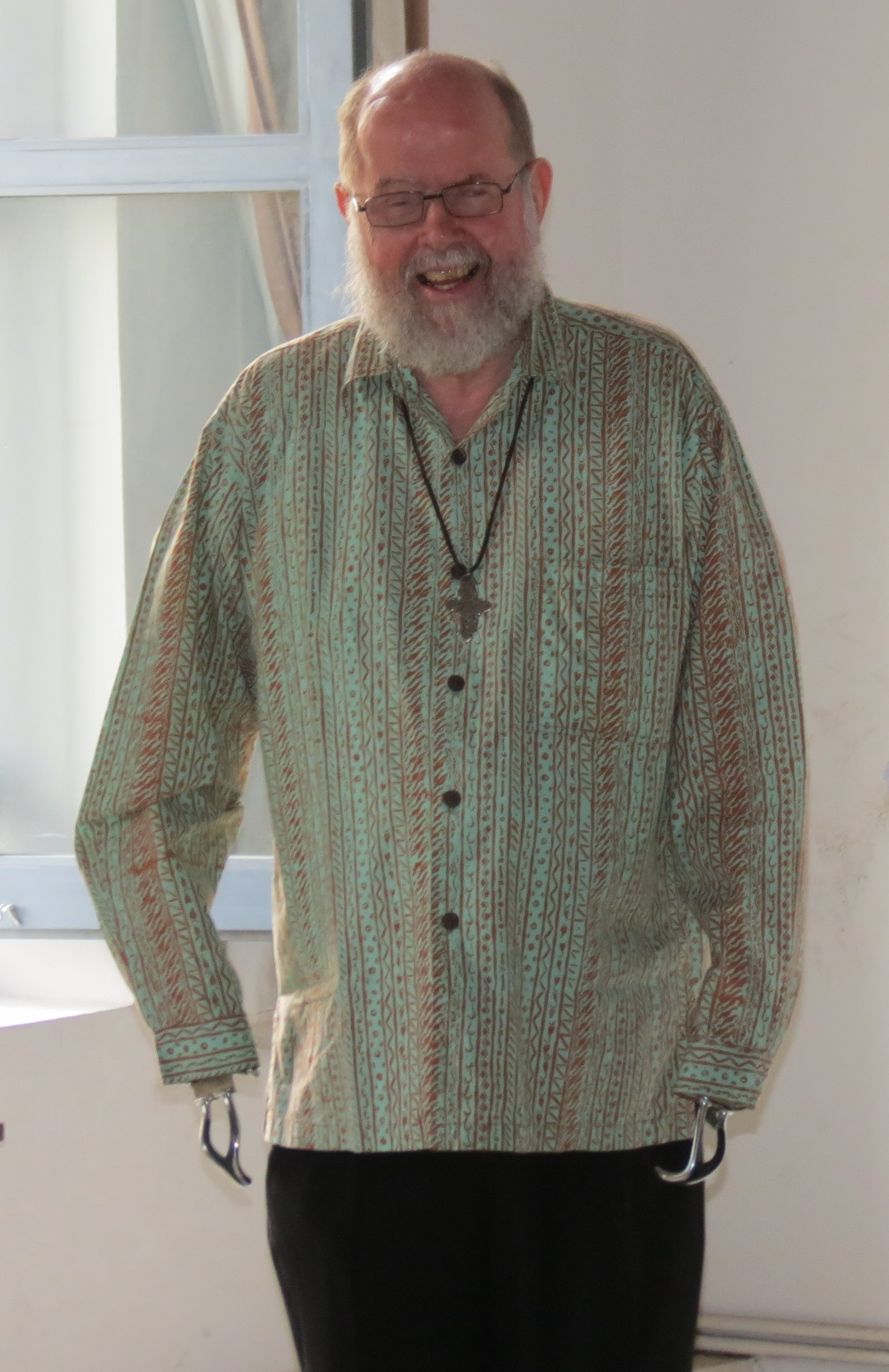
Michael Lapsley lost both hands and was blinded in one eye after a mail bombing attack

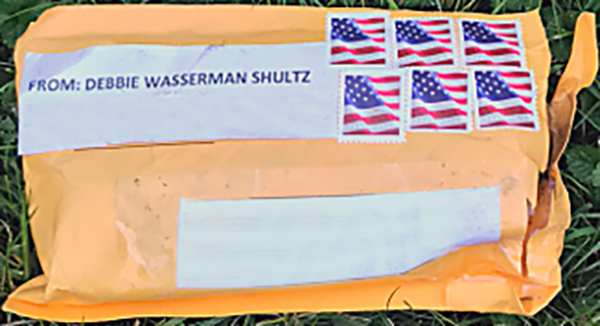
Mail bomb sent by a pro-Trump extremist, 2018

- What might be the first recorded case of a device broadly similar to a modern parcel bomb featured in the 18th century affair known as the Bandbox Plot. On November 4, 1712, a bandbox (i.e. a lightweight hat-box) was sent to Robert Harley, Earl of Oxford, the British Lord Treasurer. It contained a number of loaded and cocked pistols, to whose triggers was attached a thread which would have made the pistols fire the moment the box was opened. The plot was foiled by the perspicacity of Jonathan Swift, who happened to be visiting the Earl of Oxford. Swift, perceiving the thread, seized the package and cut the thread, thus disarming the device. The attack was laid at the door of the opposition Whig party and threw enormous popular sympathy behind Harley. The precise perpetrators were never identified or apprehended.
- One of the world's first mail bombs is mentioned in the 18th century diary of Danish official and historian Bolle Willum Luxdorph. His diary mainly consists of concise references to news from Denmark and abroad. In the entry for January 19, 1764, he writes the following: Colonel Poulsen residing at Børglum Abbey was sent by mail a box. When he opens it, therein is to be found gunpowder and a firelock which sets fire unto it, so he became very injured. The entry for February 15 same year says: Colonel Poulsen receives a letter in German, [saying] that soon the dose will be increased. It is referring to the dose of gunpowder in the box. The perpetrator was never found. In a later reference Luxdorph has found a mention of a similar bomb being used, also in 1764, but in Savona in Italy.
- June 1889: Edward White, formerly an artist at Madame Tussauds, was alleged to have sent a parcel bomb to John Theodore Tussaud after being dismissed.
- August 20, 1904: A Swedish man named Martin Ekenberg sent a mail bomb to businessman Karl Fredrik Lundin in Stockholm. It was a box loaded with bullets and explosives.
- September 28th, 1908: During the height of the Black Patch Tobacco Wars in Kentucky, a mail bomb intented for Sanford Hall, a Night Rider who had agreed to testify against that organization, was discovered in the post office of Paducah. The bomb was constructed to where that when the lid of the box was open, a file would ignite several matcheads, which would then in turn set off a stick of dynamite.
- 1912–1914: During the suffragette bombing and arson campaign, British suffragettes of the Women's Social and Political Union (WSPU) invented and then used a form of letter bomb to maim or kill political opponents during a concerted terrorist campaign.
- 1915: Vice President of the United States Thomas R. Marshall was the target of an assassination attempt by letter bomb.
- 1919: A series of package bombs were sent to officials, journalists, and others in the United States by the Galleanist anarchist faction there; this precipitated the 1919-1920 Red Scare.
- circa 1945: In the memoir of OSS operative Charles Fenn, he reported that the OSS sent letter bombs to Japanese officers in Japanese occupied territories in Asia during WWII. According to Elizabeth "Betty" McIntosh, Chinese spies working for the OSS reported that "this ploy has had quite some success blowing off the hands of Jap officers."
- 1946: Several British high officials, including Sir Stafford Cripps, Ernest Bevin, and Anthony Eden received letter bombs apparently sent by the extreme Zionist Stern Gang.
- 1947: Several letter bombs were sent to President Harry Truman in the White House. They were intercepted by White House mail room workers, who were on alert because of the letter bombs to British officials. These also were claimed by the Stern Gang.
- August 30, 1958: A parcel bomb sent by Ngo Dinh Nhu, younger brother and chief adviser of South Vietnamese President Ngo Dinh Diem, failed to kill King Sihanouk of Cambodia.
- 1961: The Nazi war criminal Alois Brunner received a letter bomb that caused the loss of an eye. In 1980 another letter bomb cost him the fingers of his left hand. Two Damascus postal workers were killed. The senders are unknown but some suspect the Israeli intelligence agency Mossad.
- November 27, 1962: A parcel sent to rocket scientist Wolfgang Pilz exploded in his office in Egypt when opened, injuring his secretary. Another parcel sent to the Heliopolis rocket factory killed five Egyptian workers.
- 1960s, 1970s and early 1980s: Several terrorist organizations in Argentina such as Montoneros and ERP included letter bombs into their weaponry.
- December 28, 1977: In Malta, Karin Grech, age 15, was killed when she opened a letterbomb addressed to her father Edwin Grech. On the same day, another bomb was sent to Labour MP Dr. Paul Chetcuti Caruana, but it did not detonate.
- 1978 to 1995: Theodore Kaczynski, the "UNAbomber", killed three and injured 23 in a series of mail bombings in the United States.
- August 27, 1980: Lyda Monteiro da Silva, secretary of Brazilian Bar Association, was killed by a letter bomb sent by anti-communist army members against the end of military dictatorship in Brazil.
- August 17, 1982: Ruth First, a South African communist anti-apartheid activist was killed by a parcel bomb mailed by the South African government to her home in Mozambique.
- June 28, 1984: Jeanette Schoon, a South African anti-apartheid activist and her 6-year-old daughter, Katryn Schoon, were killed by a letter bomb mailed by Craig Williamson, a spy for the South African Police who had been posing as a family friend. Jeanette Schoon collected and carried home a parcel bomb, which exploded upon opening the letter.
- August 1985: A woman in Rotorua, New Zealand, Michele Sticovich, was instantly killed and a close friend of hers seriously injured after she opened a parcel addressed to her containing a number of sticks of gelignite. Mrs Sticovich's estranged husband, David Sticovich, was arrested and ultimately pleaded guilty to her murder.
- October 19, 1986: Dele Giwa, a Nigerian journalist and editor of the Newswatch magazine was killed with a mail bomb, claimed to be sent by Nigeria's former dictator, Gen. Ibrahim Babangida. The general has never admitted complicity, remaining mute on the issue.
- December 16, 1989: Robert Smith Vance, a U.S. federal judge, was killed instantly upon opening a letter bomb in the kitchen of his home in Birmingham, Alabama, with his wife, Helen, seriously injured. Walter Leroy Moody Jr was later convicted of killing both Vance and Georgia attorney Robbie Robinson by use of letter bombs delivered through the mail.
- 1990: Priest Michael Lapsley was sent a letter bomb by South African government's death squad, the Civil Cooperation Bureau, hidden inside two religious magazines. He lost both hands and the sight in one eye in the blast, and was seriously burned.
- Mid-1990s: Franz Fuchs, Austrian serial mail bomber, killed four and injured 15 with waves of mail bombs and improvised explosive devices.
- January 1994: Roberto Escobar was sent a letter bomb while in jail by Medellin Cartel enemies.
- September 1996: Singer Björk was sent a letter bomb containing sulfuric acid by stalker Ricardo López. López then committed suicide. The bomb did not reach her, having been intercepted by the Metropolitan Police.
- February – October 1999: Li Shikang sent letter bombs to medical staff around China due to his frustrations about an STD. Six people were killed, and seventeen others were injured.
- July 2001: A letter bomb was sent to the office of Italian journalist Emilio Fede. When his secretary opened it, she was hit by a blaze, resulting in minor burns. The same day a similar parcel ignited in an office of the Benetton Group in Ponzano Veneto, resulting in no damage. A week later, a similar parcel aimed at the prefetto of the Province of Genoa, was intercepted by police.
- February 2007: A series of mail bombings in the United Kingdom injured nine people.
- January 2007: A bomber calling himself "The Bishop" sent several unassembled bombs to financial firms in the United States, and was arrested in April 2007.
- August 2007: A Lebanese immigrant, Adel Arnaout, was charged with sending three letter bombs out to residents in the Greater Ontario area.
- April 2011: Neil Lennon and two high-profile fans of Celtic F.C. were sent parcel bombs.
- February 2014: A series of seven letter bombs were sent to Armed Forces recruitment offices in the United Kingdom, which bore all the hallmarks of Northern Ireland-related terrorism.
- September 2015: At least six people were killed and dozens injured in explosions at 15 locations in Liucheng County in China's Guangxi Zhuang Autonomous Region. The explosives were reportedly concealed inside express delivery packages.
- May 25, 2017: A suspected letter bomb exploded within the car of Lucas Papademos, former Prime Minister of Greece, causing injuries to Papademos, his driver and another official.
- July 28, 2017: A Queens, New York, landlord opened an explosive package resembling an oatmeal container which had been sitting on his building's doorstep for several days, and died from extensive burns four days later. The USPS refused immediate comment on whether the package was mailed, citing its ongoing investigation.
- March 2018: Multiple package bombs were detonated in Austin, Texas, over the course of a few weeks, killing 2 and seriously injuring 5. The perpetrator was subsequently identified as Mark Anthony Conditt of Pflugerville, Texas.
- October 2018: Multiple package bombs were sent to prominent critics of the Donald Trump administration. The first bomb discovered was delivered to billionaire financier and activist George Soros' home on October 22, 2018. Additional bombs were sent to other political figures and activists including: former President Barack Obama; former President Bill Clinton and wife, former Secretary of State and 2016 presidential candidate Hillary Clinton; US Congresswoman Maxine Waters; CNN; former Attorney General Eric Holder; former Vice President Joe Biden; actor Robert De Niro also received bombs.
- November and December 2022: Multiple letter bombs were sent to high-profile institutions and locations across Spain, including the Prime Minister of Spain Pedro Sanchez, the Ukrainian embassy in Madrid, and the Defence Ministry.

== See also ==
- Bioterrorism
- Bomb threat
- Email bomb
- Luke Helder
- Pipe bomb
