= List of diplomatic missions in Spain =

This article lists embassies and consulates posted in Spain. At present, the capital city of Madrid hosts 126 embassies, and many countries maintain consulates in other Spanish cities (not including honorary consulates).

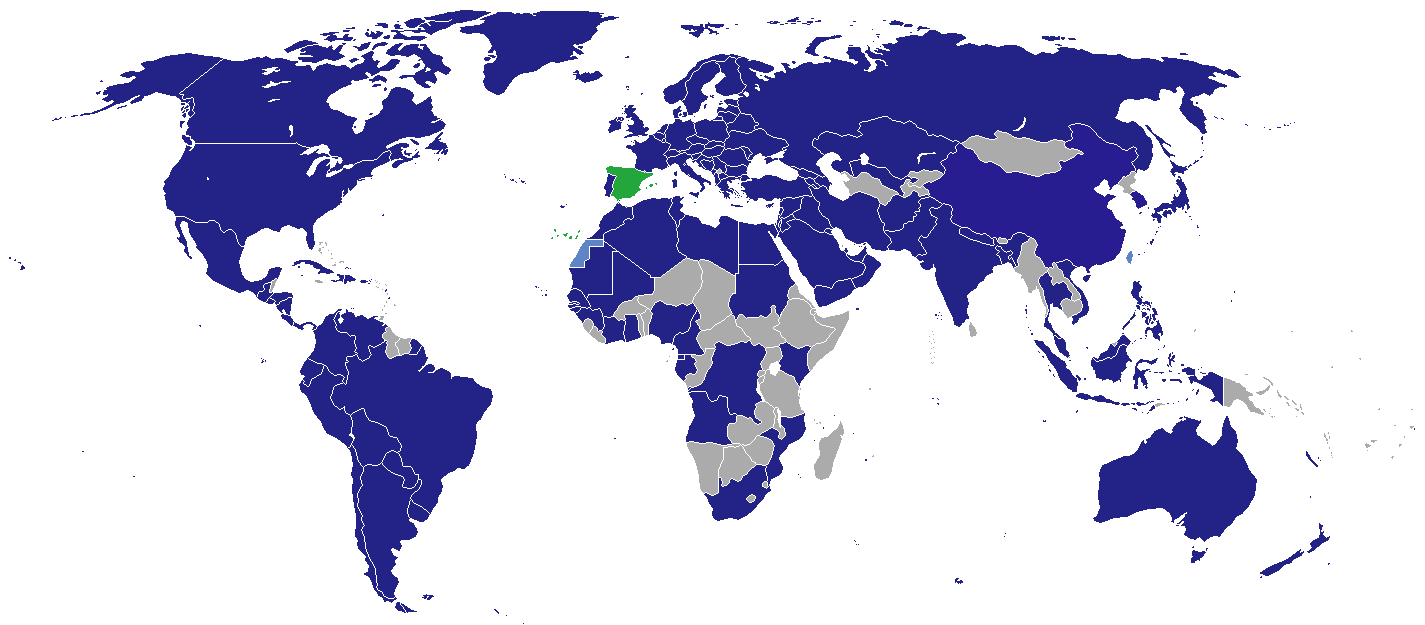
Diplomatic missions in Spain

== Diplomatic missions in Madrid ==
=== Embassies ===
1. Afghanistan
2. Albania
3. Algeria
4. Andorra
5. Angola
6. Antigua and Barbuda
7. Argentina
8. Armenia
9. Australia
10. Austria
11. Azerbaijan
12. Bangladesh
13. Belarus
14. Belgium
15. Bolivia
16. Bosnia and Herzegovina
17. Brazil
18. Bulgaria
19. Cameroon
20. Cape Verde
21. Canada
22. Chile
23. China
24. Colombia
25. Costa Rica
26. Croatia
27. Cuba
28. Cyprus
29. Czechia
30. Denmark
31. Congo-Kinshasa
32. Dominican Republic
33. Ecuador
34. Egypt
35. El Salvador
36. Equatorial Guinea
37. Estonia
38. Finland
39. France
40. Gabon
41. Gambia
42. Georgia
43. Germany
44. Ghana
45. Greece
46. Guatemala
47. Guinea
48. Guinea-Bissau
49. Haiti
50. Holy See
51. Honduras
52. Hungary
53. Iceland
54. India
55. Indonesia
56. Iran
57. Iraq
58. Ireland
59. Israel
60. Italy
61. Ivory Coast
62. Japan
63. Jordan
64. Kazakhstan
65. Kenya
66. Kuwait
67. Latvia
68. Lebanon
69. Libya
70. Lithuania
71. Luxembourg
72. Malaysia
73. Mali
74. Malta
75. Mauritania
76. Mexico
77. Moldova
78. Monaco
79. Montenegro
80. Morocco
81. Mozambique
82. Nepal
83. Netherlands
84. New Zealand
85. Nicaragua
86. Nigeria
87. North Macedonia
88. Norway
89. Oman
90. Pakistan
91. Palestine
92. Panama
93. Paraguay
94. Peru
95. Philippines
96. Poland
97. Portugal
98. Qatar
99. Romania
100. Russia
101. Rwanda
102. San Marino
103. Saudi Arabia
104. Senegal
105. Serbia
106. Slovakia
107. Slovenia
108. South Africa
109. South Korea
110. Sovereign Order of Malta
111. Sudan
112. Sweden
113. Switzerland
114. Syria
115. Thailand
116. Tunisia
117. Turkey
118. Ukraine
119. United Arab Emirates
120. United Kingdom
121. United States
122. Uruguay
123. Uzbekistan
124. Venezuela
125. Vietnam
126. Yemen

=== Other delegations or missions ===
1. Sahrawi Republic (Representative Office)
2. Republic of China (Taiwan) (Economic & Cultural Office)

== Consular missions ==
=== A Coruña, Galicia ===
- Panama (Consulate-General)

=== Algeciras, Andalusia ===
- Morocco (Consulate-General)

=== Alicante, Valencian Community ===
- Algeria (Consulate-General)
- Belgium (Consulate)
- United Kingdom (Consulate)

=== Almería, Andalusia ===
- Morocco (Consulate-General)
- Romania (Consulate)

=== Arona, Canary Islands ===
- Italy (Vice-consulate)

=== Barcelona, Catalonia ===
1. Algeria
2. Argentina
3. Belgium
4. Bolivia
5. Brazil
6. Bulgaria
7. Canada
8. Chile
9. China
10. Colombia
11. Cuba
12. Dominican Republic
13. Ecuador
14. El Salvador
15. France
16. Georgia
17. Germany
18. Honduras
19. Hungary
20. India
21. Italy
22. Japan
23. Kazakhstan
24. Mexico
25. Morocco
26. Pakistan
27. Panama
28. Paraguay
29. Peru
30. Philippines
31. Poland
32. Portugal
33. Qatar
34. Romania
35. Russia
36. Senegal
37. South Korea
38. Switzerland
39. Turkey
40. Ukraine
41. United Kingdom
42. United States
43. Uruguay
44. Venezuela

=== Bilbao, Basque Country ===
- Bolivia (Consulate)
- Colombia (Consulate)
- France (Consulate-General)
- Honduras (Consulate-General)
- Morocco (Consulate-General)
- Peru (Consulate-General)
- Romania (Consulate-General)
- Venezuela (Consulate-General)

=== Cádiz, Andalusia ===
- Argentina (Consulate)

=== Castellón de la Plana, Valencian Community ===
- Romania (Consulate)

=== Ciudad Real, Castilla-La Mancha ===
- Romania (Consulate)

=== Fuengirola, Andalusia ===
- United States (Consular agency)

=== Girona, Catalonia ===
- Honduras (Vice Consulate)
- Morocco (Consulate-General)

=== Granada, Andalusia ===
- Bolivia (Vice-Consulate)

=== Ibiza, Balearic Islands ===
- United Kingdom (Consulate)

=== Las Palmas de Gran Canaria, Canary Islands ===
- Colombia (Consulate)
- Cuba (Consulate-General)
- Equatorial Guinea (Consulate-General)
- Germany (Consulate)
- Japan (Consulate)
- Mauritania (Consulate-General)
- Morocco (Consulate-General)
- Panama (Consulate-General)
- South Korea Consular Office
- United Kingdom (Consulate)
- United States (Consular agency)
- Uruguay (Consulate-General)

=== Málaga, Andalusia ===
- Ecuador (Consulate-General)
- Germany (Consulate)
- Panama (Consulate-General)
- Paraguay (Consulate-General)
- Saudi Arabia (Consulate-General)
- Ukraine (Consulate)
- United Kingdom (Consulate)

=== Murcia, Murcia ===
- Bolivia (Consulate)
- Ecuador (Consulate-General)
- Morocco (Consulate-General)

=== Palma de Mallorca, Balearic Islands ===
- Argentina (Consulate)
- Bolivia (Vice-Consulate)
- Colombia (Consulate)
- Germany (Consulate)
- United Kingdom (Consulate)
- United States (Consular agency)

=== Santa Cruz de Tenerife, Canary Islands ===
- Argentina (Consulate)
- Belgium (Consulate)
- Dominican Republic (Consulate-General)
- United Kingdom (Consulate)
- Venezuela (Consulate-General)

=== Santiago de Compostela, Galicia ===
- Cuba (Consulate-General)
- Uruguay (Consulate-General)

=== Seville, Andalusia ===
- Bolivia (Consulate)
- Colombia (Consulate-General)
- Cuba (Consulate-General)
- Dominican Republic (Consulate-General)
- El Salvador (Consulate-General)
- France (Consulate-General)
- Morocco (Consulate-General)
- Peru (Consulate-General)
- Portugal (Consulate-General)
- Romania (Consulate-General)
- United States (Consular agency)

=== Tarragona, Catalonia ===
- Morocco (Consulate-General)

=== Valencia, Valencian Community ===
- Bolivia (Consulate)
- Bulgaria (Consulate-General)
- Colombia (Consulate)
- Dominican Republic (Consulate)
- Ecuador (Consulate-General)
- Honduras (Consulate-General)
- Lithuania (Consulate)
- Morocco (Consulate-General)
- Panama (Consulate-General)
- Peru (Consulate-General)
- Romania (Consulate-General)
- United States (Consular agency)
- Uruguay (Consulate-General)

=== Vigo, Galicia ===
- Argentina (Consulate-General)
- Portugal (Consulate-General)
- Venezuela (Consulate-General)

=== Zaragoza, Aragon ===
- Romania (Consulate)

== Non-Resident embassies ==
=== Resident in Brussels, Belgium ===
1. Barbados
2. Belize
3. Bhutan
4. Comoros
5. Guyana
6. Jamaica
7. Papua New Guinea
8. Samoa
9. Trinidad and Tobago

=== Resident in London, United Kingdom ===
1. Bahrain
2. Botswana
3. Dominica
4. Eswatini
5. Grenada
6. Lesotho
7. Malawi
8. Maldives
9. Saint Lucia
10. Sierra Leone

=== Resident in Paris, France ===
1. Benin
2. Brunei
3. Burkina Faso
4. Burundi
5. Central African Republic
6. Cambodia
7. Chad
8. Congo-Brazzaville
9. Djibouti
10. Eritrea
11. Ethiopia
12. Kyrgyzstan
13. Laos
14. Liberia
15. Madagascar
16. Mauritius
17. Mongolia
18. Myanmar
19. Namibia
20. Niger
21. Seychelles
22. Sri Lanka
23. Tanzania
24. Togo
25. Uganda
26. Zambia
27. Zimbabwe

=== Resident elsewhere ===
1. North Korea (Rome)
2. São Tomé and Príncipe (Lisbon)
3. Singapore (Singapore)
4. Tajikistan (Geneva)
5. Timor-Leste (Lisbon)
6. Turkmenistan (Berlin)

== Closed missions ==
Host city	Sending country	Mission	Year closed	Ref.
Madrid	North Korea	Embassy	2023	
Alicante	Ecuador	Consulate	2018	
Alicante	Norway	Consulate-General	2012	
Barcelona	Netherlands	Consulate-General	2012	
Barcelona	Sweden	Consulate-General	1993	
Barcelona	United Arab Emirates	Consulate-General	2022	
Bilbao	Portugal	Consulate	2007	
Cádiz	Venezuela	Consulate-General	1985	
Las Palmas de Gran Canaria	Finland	Consulate	2012	
Las Palmas de Gran Canaria	Sweden	Consulate	1993	
Las Palmas de Gran Canaria	Switzerland	Consulate	2012	
Málaga	Morocco	Consulate	1995	
Málaga	Sweden	Consulate-General	1993	
Málaga	Switzerland	Consulate	1998	
Palma de Mallorca	France	Consulate	1993	
Palma de Mallorca	Sweden	Consulate	1990	
Pamplona	Ecuador	Consulate	2013	
Santa Cruz de Tenerife	Sweden	Consulate	1980	
Seville	United Kingdom	Consulate	2001	
Valencia	France	Consulate-General	1996	

== See also ==
- Foreign relations of Spain
- List of diplomatic missions of Spain
- List of diplomatic missions in Madrid
- Visa requirements for Spanish citizens
