= Embassy of Indonesia, Madrid =

Embassy of the Republic of Indonesia in Madrid Kedutaan Besar Republik Indonesia di Madrid Embajada de la República de Indonesia en Madrid

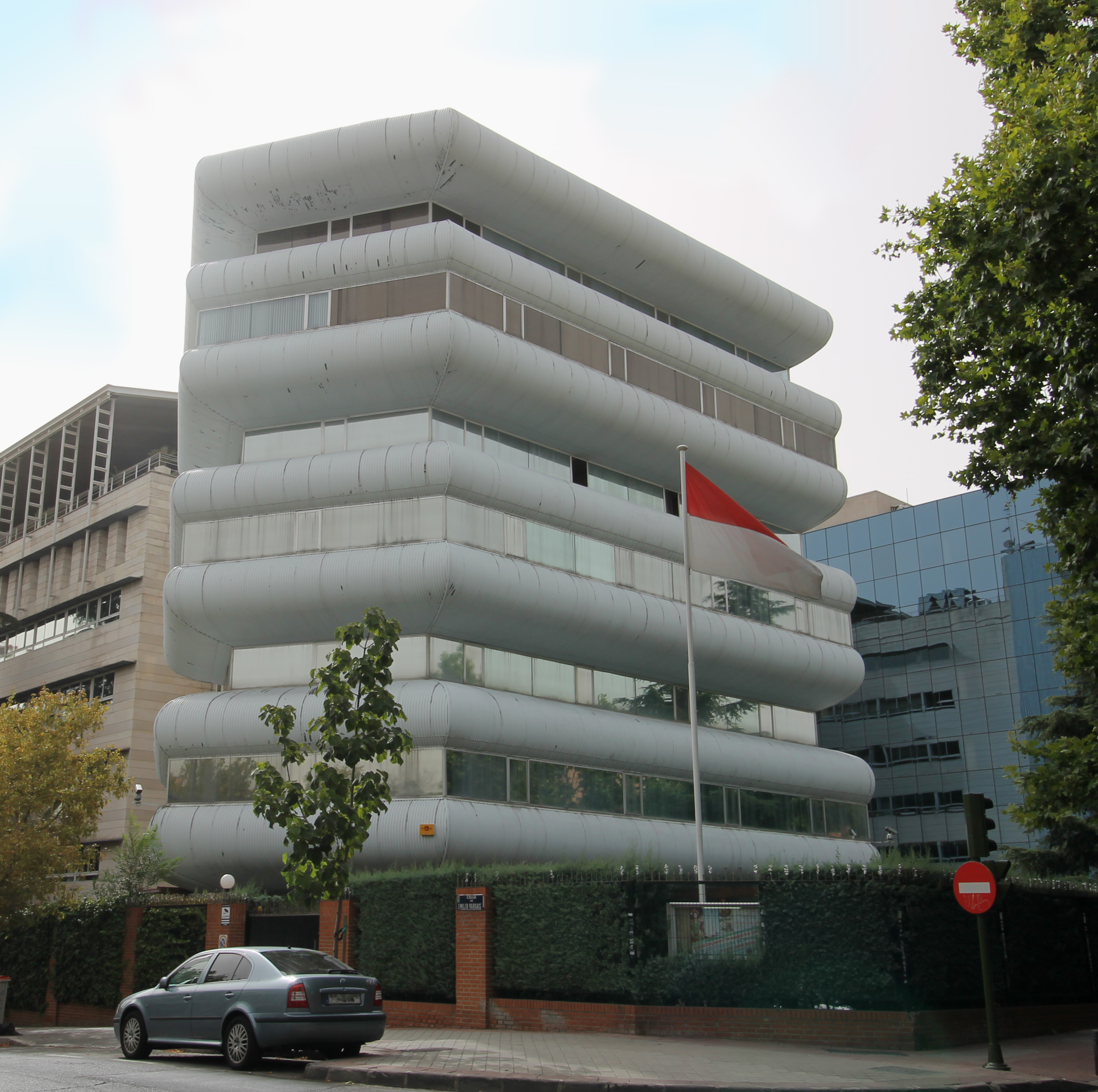
- Location: Madrid, Spain
- Address: Calle de Agastia, 65; 28043 Madrid, Spain
- Coordinates: 40.448519°N 3.653657°W
- Ambassador: Muhammad Najib
- Website: kemlu.go.id/madrid/en

The Embassy of the Republic of Indonesia in Madrid (Indonesian: Kedutaan Besar Republik Indonesia di Madrid; Spanish: Embajada de la República de Indonesia en Madrid) is the diplomatic mission of the Republic of Indonesia to the Kingdom of Spain. The first Indonesian ambassador to Spain was Boediardjo (1976–1979). The current ambassador, Muhammad Najib, was appointed by President Joko Widodo on 25 October 2021.

== History ==
Diplomatic relations between Indonesia and Spain were established in February 1976. Boediardjo, as the first Indonesian ambassador to Spain, presented his credentials to the King of Spain, Juan Carlos I, on 26 February 1976. In April of the same year, the staff of the diplomatic mission who initially used the Melía Castilla Hotel in Madrid as their offices moved to a building at Calle de López de Hoyos 38. At that time, the mission included the ambassador and several diplomats who were responsible for matters of politics and economy, information and culture, communication, and administration, and a personal secretary to the head of mission. In addition, the mission hired several local employees.

In 1979, the diplomatic mission moved to Calle de Cinca 18. Then in 1984, the offices moved to its present location at Calle de Emilio Vargas 7 (the official address is Calle de Agastia 65). The building that houses the chancery was designed by Miguel Fisac.

In 1976, a villa located at Calle Monte Alto 40 in the Montecillo de Humera area of Madrid was rented and used as the official residence of Ambassador Boediardjo. In 1978, a different villa in the same street (Calle Monte Alto 44) was subsequently rented as the official residence of the ambassador, which was called Wisma Duta. The Indonesian government purchased this second villa in 1981.

== Gallery ==
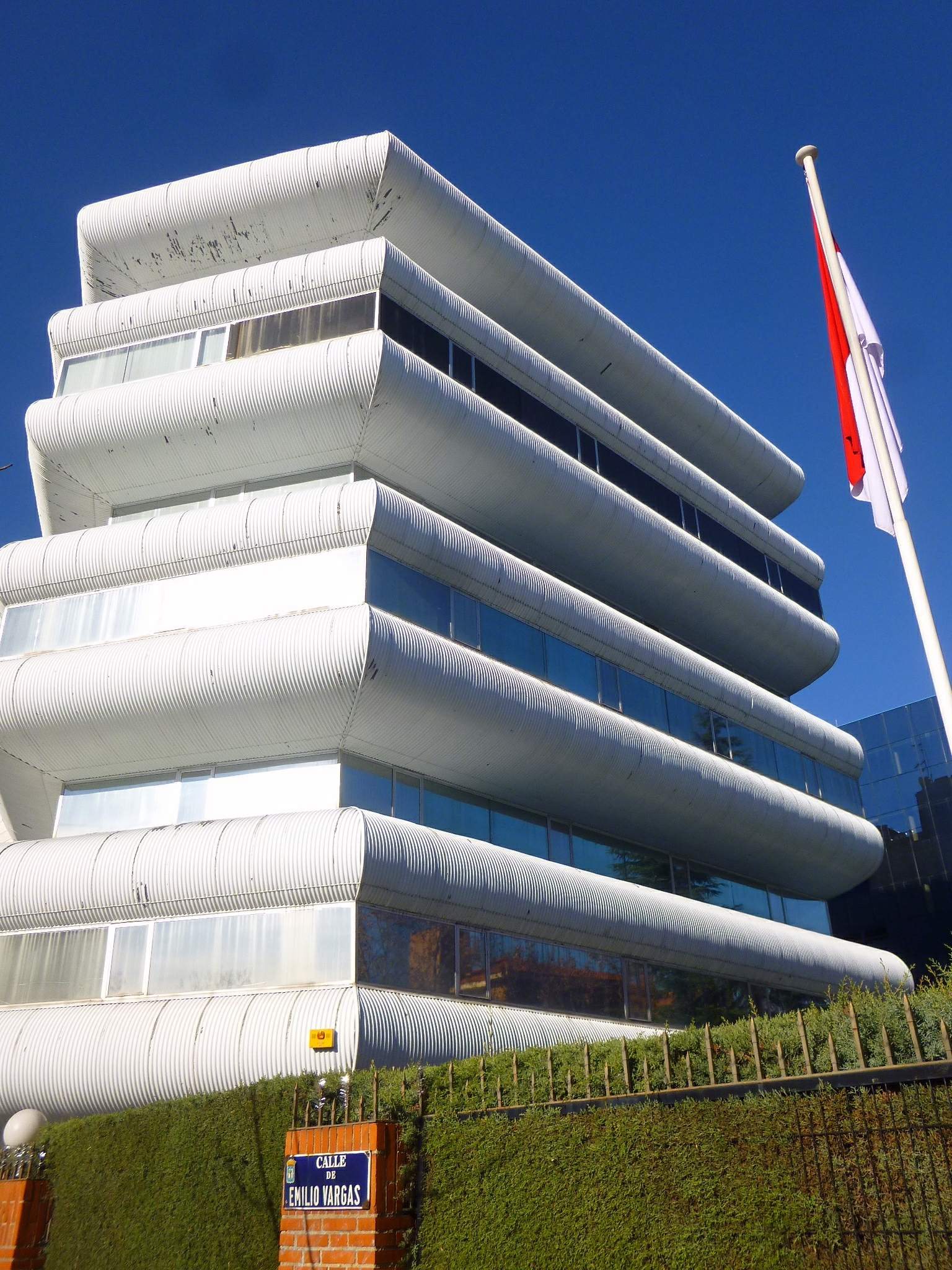
Chancery at Calle de Agastia, 65

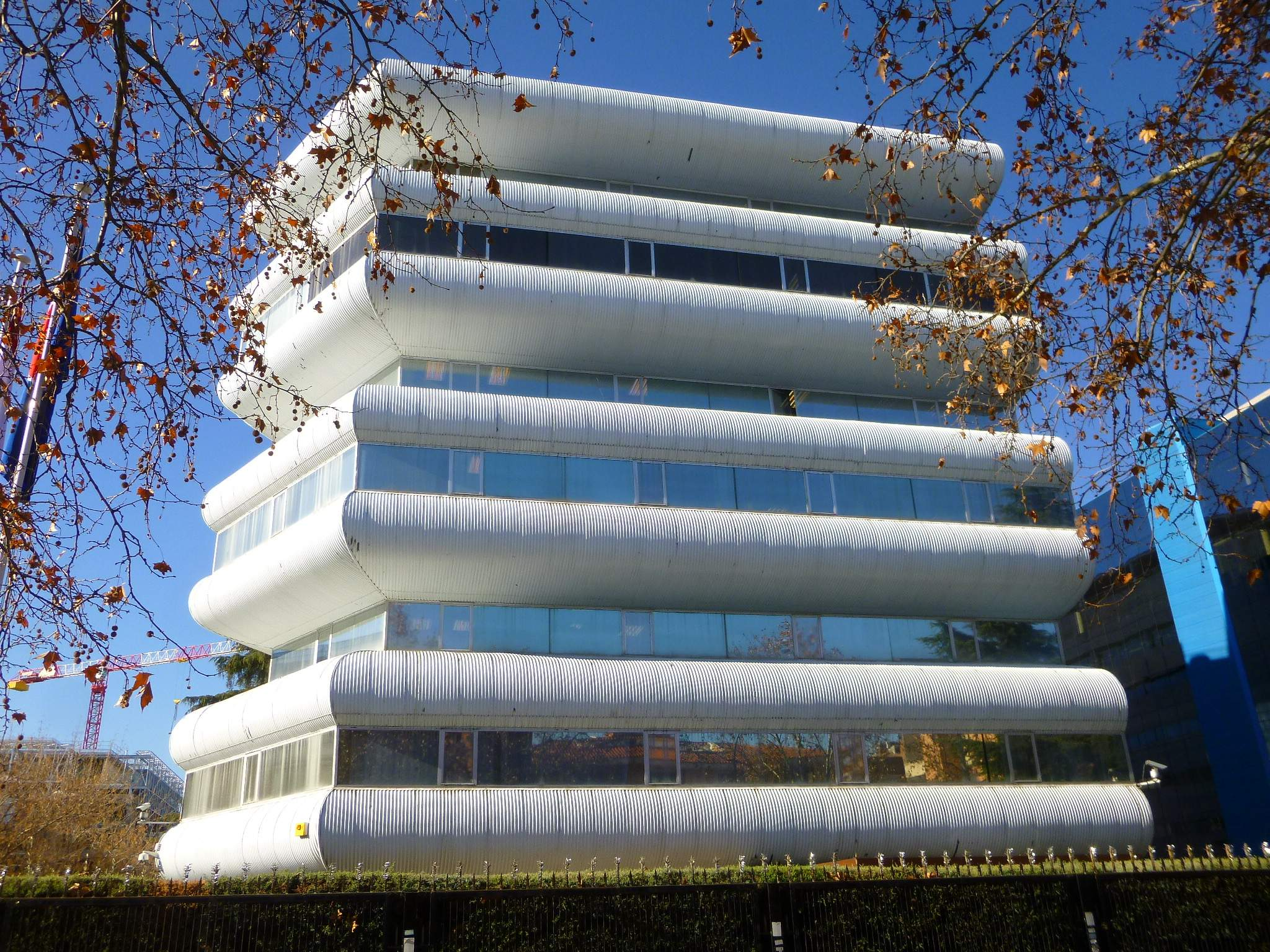
Chancery at Calle de Agastia, 65

== See also ==
- Indonesia–Spain relations
- List of diplomatic missions of Indonesia
- List of diplomatic missions of Spain
