= Mecistocephalus simplex =

Scientific classification
- Kingdom: Animalia
- Phylum: Arthropoda
- Subphylum: Myriapoda
- Class: Chilopoda
- Order: Geophilomorpha
- Family: Mecistocephalidae
- Genus: Mecistocephalus
- Species: M. simplex

Binomial name
- Mecistocephalus simplex Chamberlin, 1920

Species of centipede

Mecistocephalus simplex is a species of soil centipede in the Mecistocephalidae family. This centipede is found in Australia and the Solomon Islands. This species features 49 pairs of legs and can reach 40 mm in length.

== Discovery ==
This species was first described in 1920 by American biologist Ralph Vary Chamberlin. He based the original description of this species on a holotype found by the American zoologist William Morton Wheeler in 1914 in the region of Cairns in Queensland in Australia. This holotype is deposited in the Museum of Comparative Zoology at Harvard University.

== Description ==
This species features 49 leg pairs and can reach 40 mm in length. The body is fulvous, but the head and forcipules are chestnut. The head is 1.66 times as long as wide. The mandible features seven pectinate lamellae (comb blades) with teeth down to the base. The distal teeth are longer than the proximal teeth. The teeth on the first article of the forcipules are stout, blunt, and rounded. The groove on the sternites of the anterior segments is forked at the anterior end, with the branches forming obtuse angles. The basal elements of the ultimate legs feature numerous small pores.

This species shares many traits with another species of Mecistocephalus found in Queensland, M. kurandanus. For example, as in all species in this genus, the head in each of these two species is evidently longer than wide, and the sternites of the trunk segments in each species feature a groove. Furthermore, like most species in this genus, these two species each feature 49 leg-bearing segments. Moreover, the groove on the sternites in both species is forked, and both species feature numerous small pores on the ultimate legs.

The species M. simplex can be distinguished from M. kurandanus, however, based on other traits. For example, the branches of the groove on the sternites form obtuse angles in M. simplex but more rectangular angles in M. kurandanus. Furthermore, the posterior margin of the side pieces of the labrum feature notches in M. kurandanus that are absent in M. simplex.

== Distribution ==
The species M. simplex is found not only in coastal northeastern Queensland in Australia but also in the Solomon Islands. In Queensland, this species has been recorded not only at the type locality (Cairns) but also in the town of Kuranda. In the Solomon Islands, this species has been recorded on the Olu Malau Islands in the province of Makira-Ulawa.

== Ecology ==
This centipede is a solitary terrestrial predator that inhabits plant litter and soil.
