= Teonimanu =

Coordinates: 9°59′S 161°59′E

Teonimanu is a theorized former island in the Solomon Islands; it was supposed to be located south of Ulawa and north of the Olu Malau (Three Sisters) Islands in what is now Makira-Ulawa Province. Lark Shoal could be a remnant of the island, which apparently disappeared in the 17th or early 18th century. The Pagewa and Aiga Tatari clans of Owaraha and other nearby islands claim descent from the Teonimanu refugees. Local traditions tell of several other, smaller islands in the same vicinity, which may have also disappeared.

== See also ==
- Phantom islands
