= Solomon Islands–Spain relations =

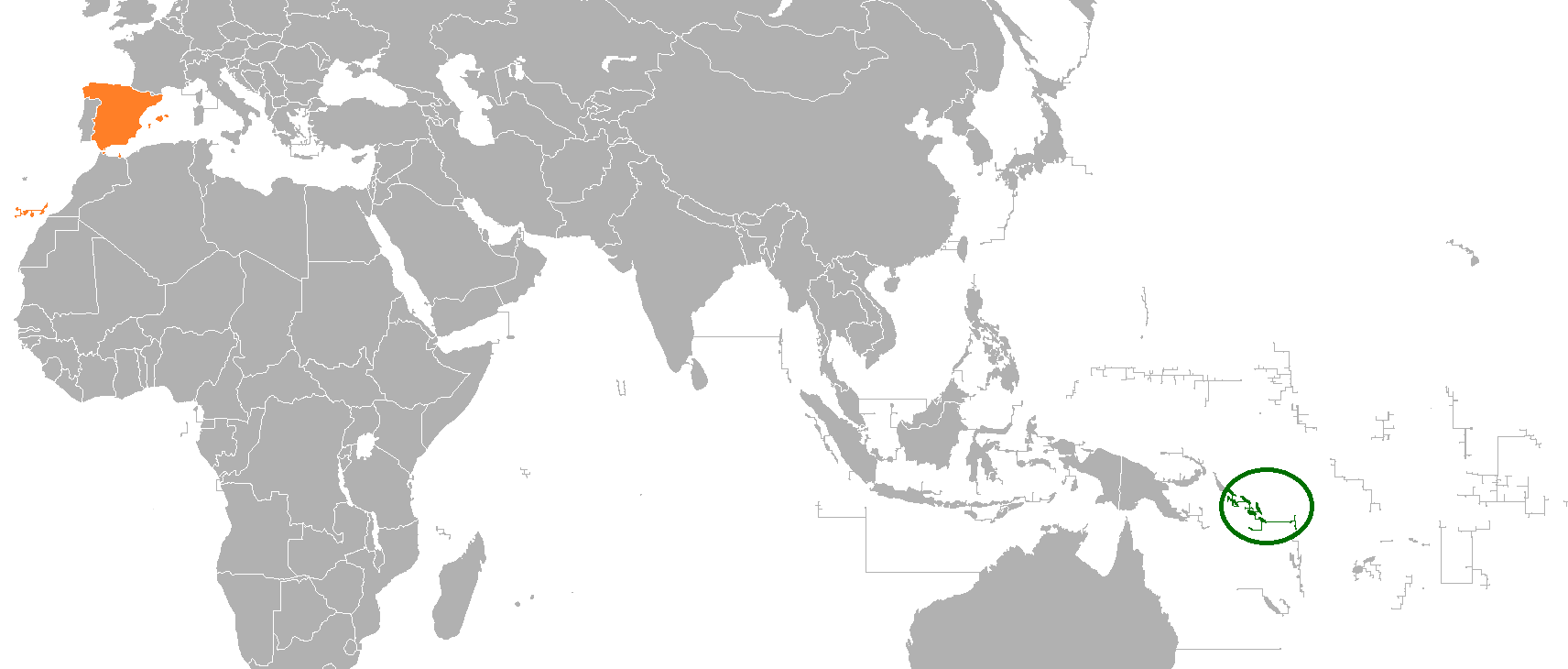

- Solomon Islands: Spain

Solomon Islands–Spain relations are the bilateral and diplomatic relations between these two countries. Solomon Islands does not have an embassy resident in Spain but maintains an honorary consulate in Madrid. Spain has an honorary consulate in Solomon Islands.

== Historical relations ==
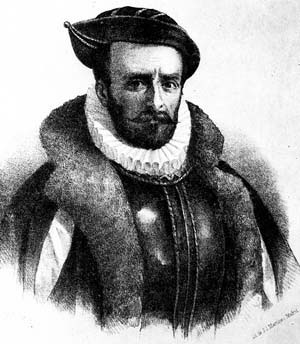
Álvaro de Mendaña

In 1567, the Spanish explorer Álvaro de Mendaña de Neira left El Callao, Spain, in search of Terra Australis Incognita to assess opportunities for colonisation and the exploitation of its resources. He took Pedro Sarmiento de Gamboa and Pedro de Ortega as captains of the two ships, Los Reyes and Todos los Santos. On 7 February 1568, the ships arrived at the first of the islands encountered in the Solomon Islands archipelago, naming it Santa Isabel de la Estrella (St. Elizabeth of the Star of Bethlehem in Spanish) and which is now Santa Isabel. Local exploration was led by Maestre de Campo, Pedro Ortega Valencia and Alférez Hernando Enríquez over six months exploring Palm Island now Malaita, San Jorge (south of Santa Isabel), Florecida, Galera, Buenavista, San Dimas, Nggela Sule, Guadalcanal, Sesarga (Savo), San Nicolás Islands, San Jerónimo and Arrecifes (group New Georgia), San Marcos (Choiseul), San Cristóbal (Makira), Treguada (Ulawa), Tres Marías (Olu Malau Islands), San Juan (Uki Ni Masi), San Urbán (Rennell), Santa Catalina and Santa Ana.

Álvaro de Mendaña undertook a second expedition to the Solomon Islands to colonise them and to prevent them from serving as a refuge for English pirates, which were then attacking Spanish ships trading with the Philippines. The expedition was authorised and sponsored by the Viceroy of Peru, García Hurtado de Mendoza who also contributed military personnel, while Mendaña himself convinced merchants and settlers to participate in the company. The expedition left El Callao in 1595, discovered the Marquesas Islands, named in honor of the viceroy and marquis of Cañete, and passed through the Cook Islands and Tuvalu, before arriving at Santa Cruz Islands in the south of the archipelago.

== Diplomatic relations ==
Spain established diplomatic relations with the nation state of Solomon Islands on 8 August 1980, but did not establish an embassy there but placed it under the jurisdiction of the Spanish Embassy in Canberra, Australia consular affairs managed by the Spanish consulate general in Sydney.

In 2013, Spain opened an honorary consulate in Honiara, reporting to the Spanish consulate in Sydney. At the municipal level, the Andalusian city of Guadalcanal and the island of Guadalcanal signed a twinning agreement the same year.

== Bilateral visits ==
- In August 2012, a Spanish delegation met with representatives of Solomon Islands in the framework of the Pacific Islands Forum (PIF) in Rarotonga, Cook Islands, and made an economic contribution to the financing of the PIF Secretariat.
- In May 2013, official credentials presentation trip by Ambassador Enrique Viguera.
- In July 2013, a delegation from Guadalcanal attended the twinning ceremony between the island of Guadalcanal, Solomon Islands and Guadalcanal, Seville.
- In March 2014, official visit of the Director General of North America, Asia and Pacific and Maria Moset, of the General Secretariat of Fisheries, Sub-Directorate General of Regional Fisheries Agreements and Organizations, Ministry of Agriculture, Food and Environment Environment, to hold bilateral meetings.

== See also ==
- Foreign relations of Solomon Islands
- Foreign relations of Spain
