= Kirakira, Solomon Islands =

Kirakira
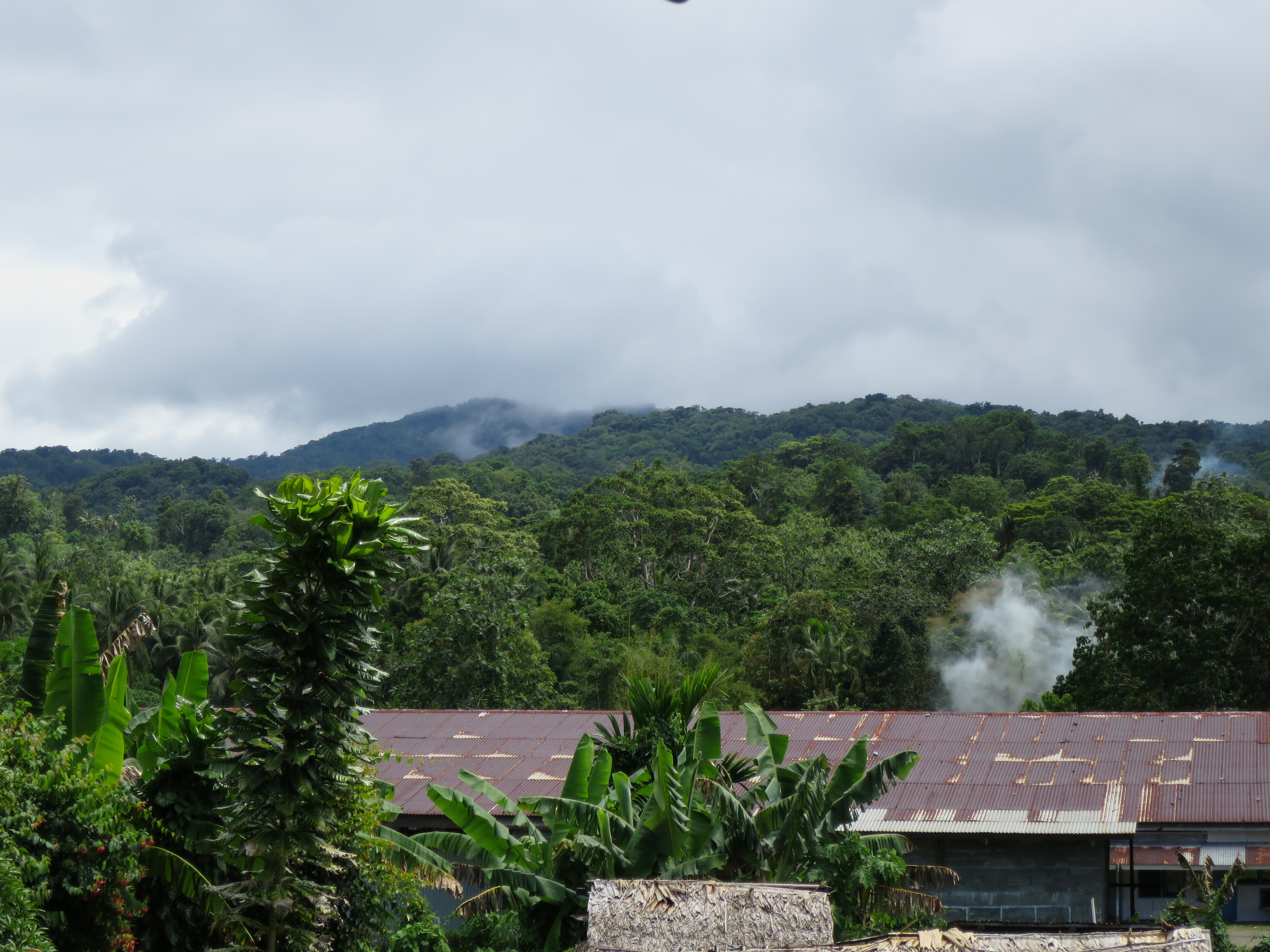
- View from the Main Street in Kirakira, close to Kirakira Hospital

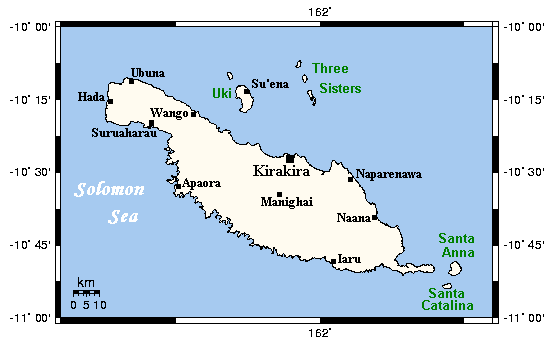
- Location in Makira Island

- Location in Solomon Islands
- Coordinates: 10°27′S 161°55′E
- Country: Solomon Islands
- Province: Makira-Ulawa
- Island: Makira
- Elevation: 152 m (499 ft)

Population (2019)
  - Total: 2,107

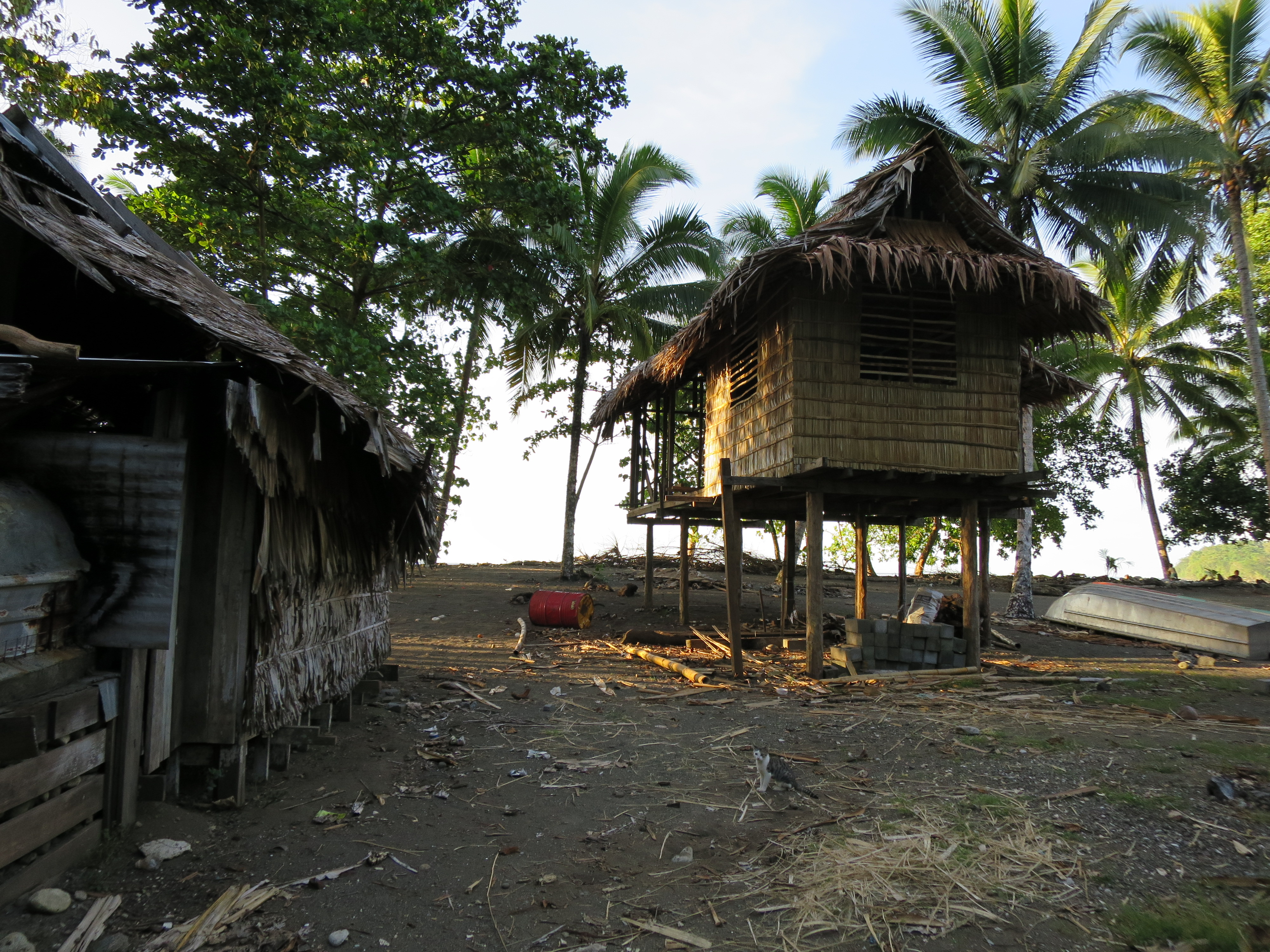
Houses in Kirakira, next to the beach

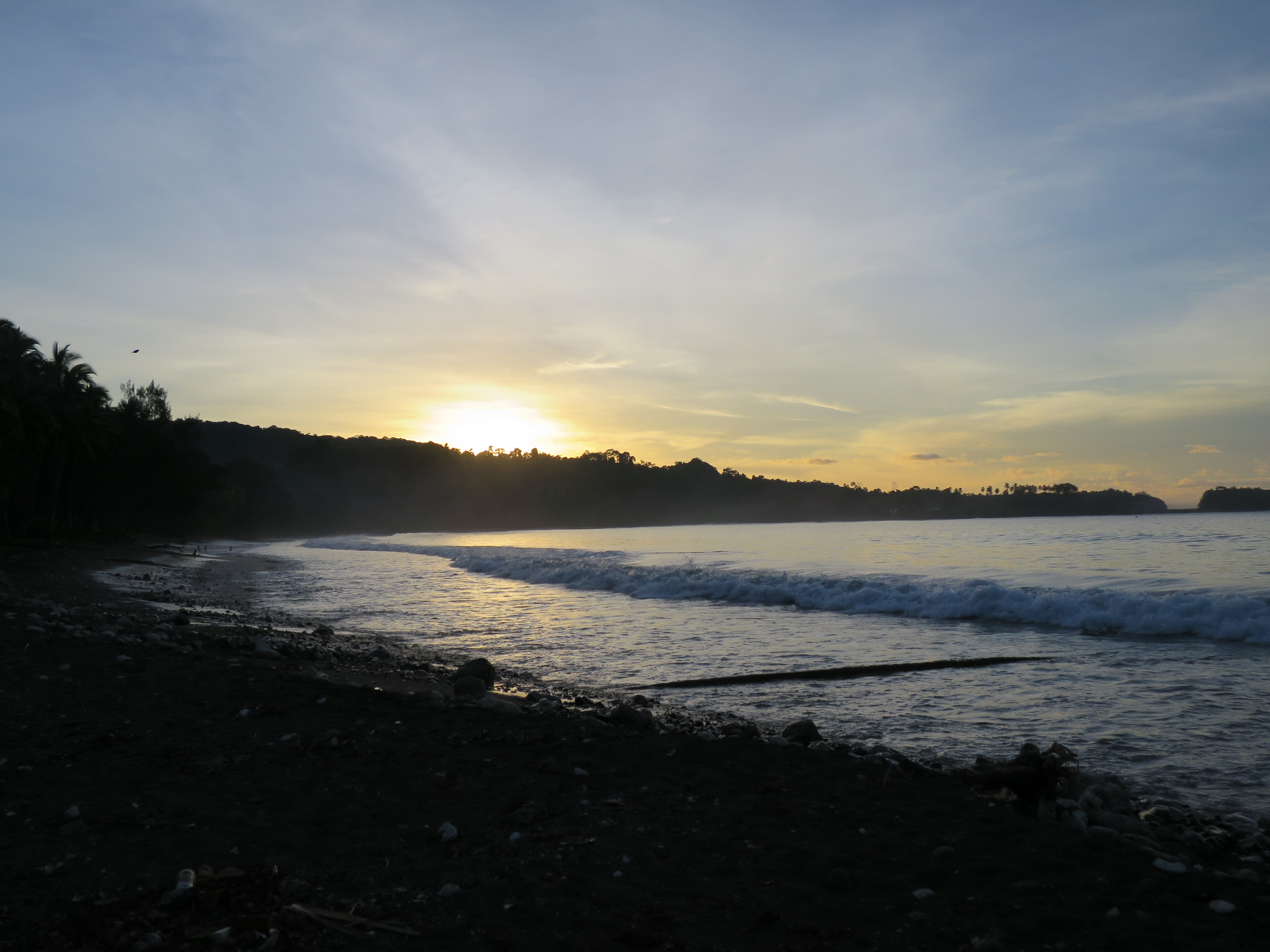
Sunset at the local beach in Kirakira

Kirakira, also spelt Kira Kira, is the provincial capital of the Makira-Ulawa Province in Solomon Islands. Kirakira is located on the north coast of Makira (formerly San Cristobal), the largest island of the province. It has roads running 18 kilometres (11 mi) east to the Warihito River and 100 kilometres (62 mi) west to Maro'u Bay.

Kirakira Airport is served by Solomon Airlines, which provides flights to Honiara and other destinations. The airport is a grass strip and receives flights four times per week. It is a 45-minute flight from Honiara. Planes landing at the airport vary in size from a 6-seat Islander to a 36-seat Dash 8 twin turboprop. If there is too much rain, the airstrip can be too muddy to allow planes to safely land.

Kirakira is a small town of 2,107 people as of 2019. The premier, Thomas Weipe, is the local Makira-Ulawa representative for Solomon Islands parliament. Kirakira has electricity provided by diesel generator, and running water. There are often periods where there is no power each day for 1–2 hours while the generator is maintained. The town is nestled on the bay opposite the airport. There is mobile phone coverage in Kirakira that allows for talk and text communication, but not mobile internet services. The internet can usually only be accessed at the post office. Despite an annual rainfall in excess of 3 metres, there are challenges associated with securing the water supply for the town. A centerpiece of the community is a full-sized soccer oval.

90% of the population on the island, and Kirakira, is broadly Christian, with various denominations, including Roman Catholic, South Pacific Christian and Seventh-day Adventist churches.

A range of languages and dialects spoken in Kirakira. Pidgin English is the lingua franca spoken by the local islanders. English is the official language used by the staff at the hospital and in the schools.

== Education ==
There are primary and secondary schools in Kirakira. Primary school education is compulsory. There is a large government boarding school on Makira Island that takes students to year 12 from all over Solomon Islands. Students sleep in bunk beds in dormitories that hold about 40 students. The fees at government-funded boarding schools are modest but still a challenge for Solomon Islanders, at approximately SI$2,000SBD (approximately US$248) for board and tuition for a year at a public boarding school in the Solomon Islands. There is no formal tertiary or trade education in Kirakira. Students must leave the island to gain further qualifications after secondary school.

== Economy ==
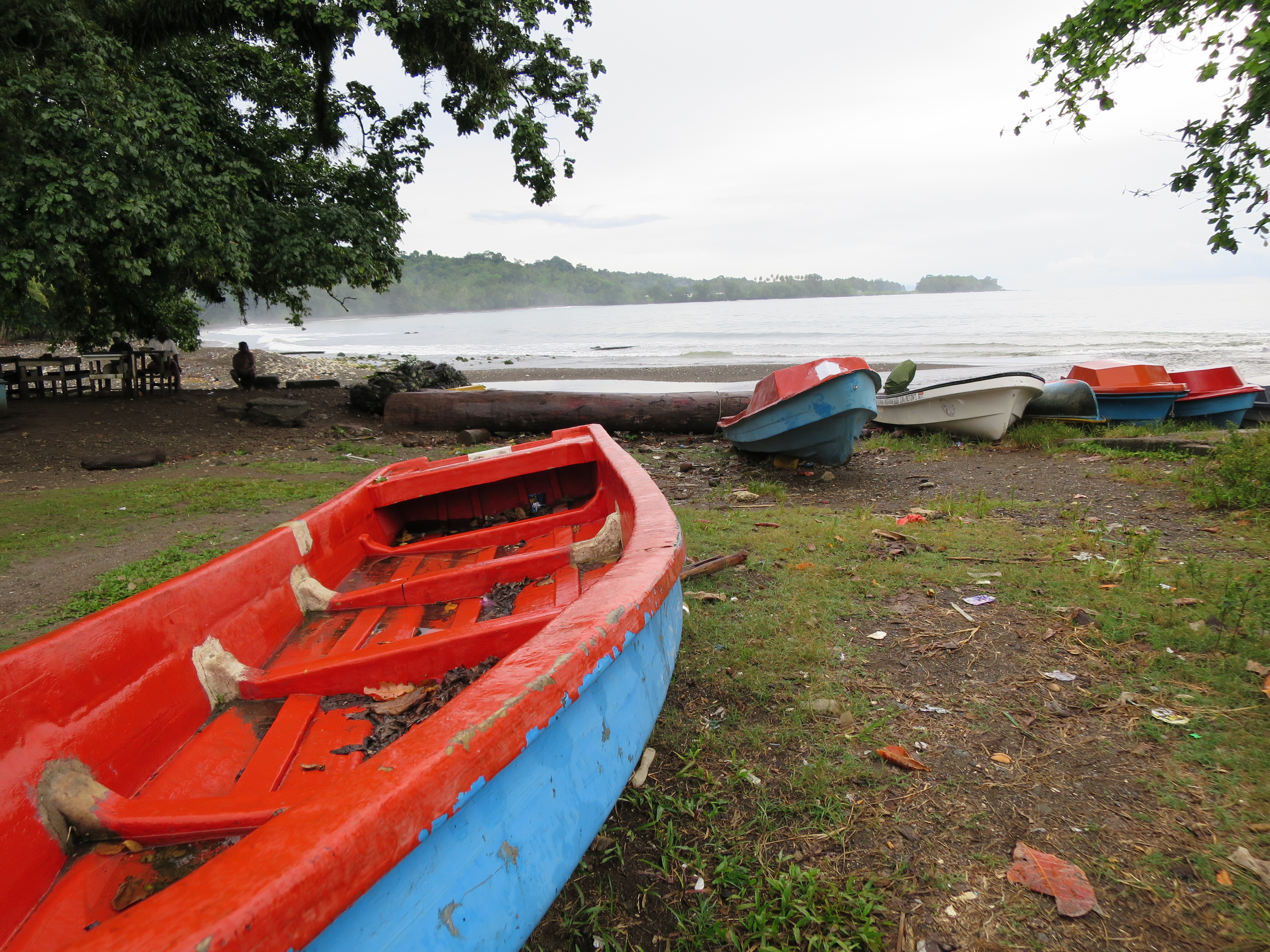
The beach at Kirakira, where local markets are usually held daily

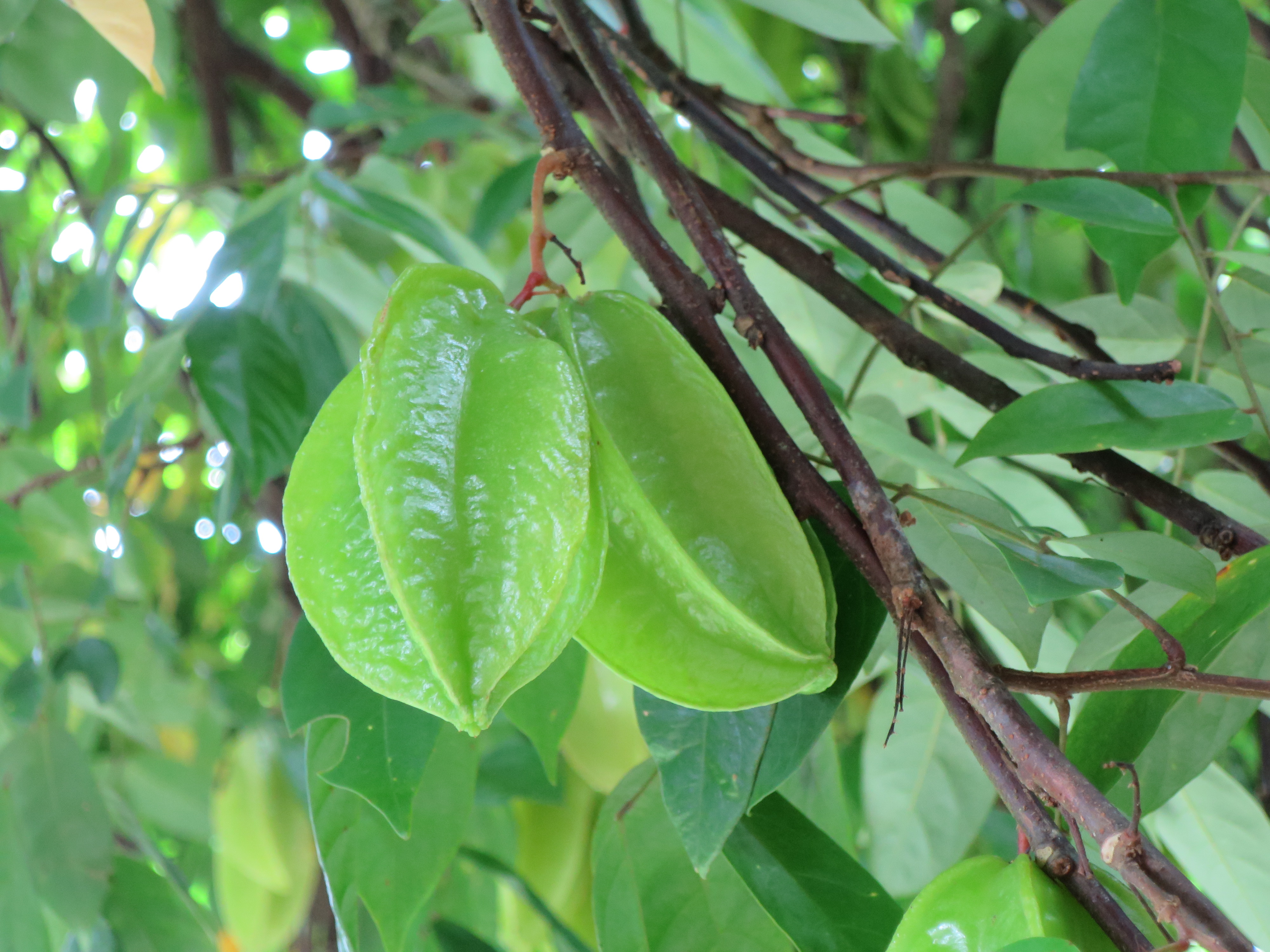
Starfruit, which is grown in Kirakira

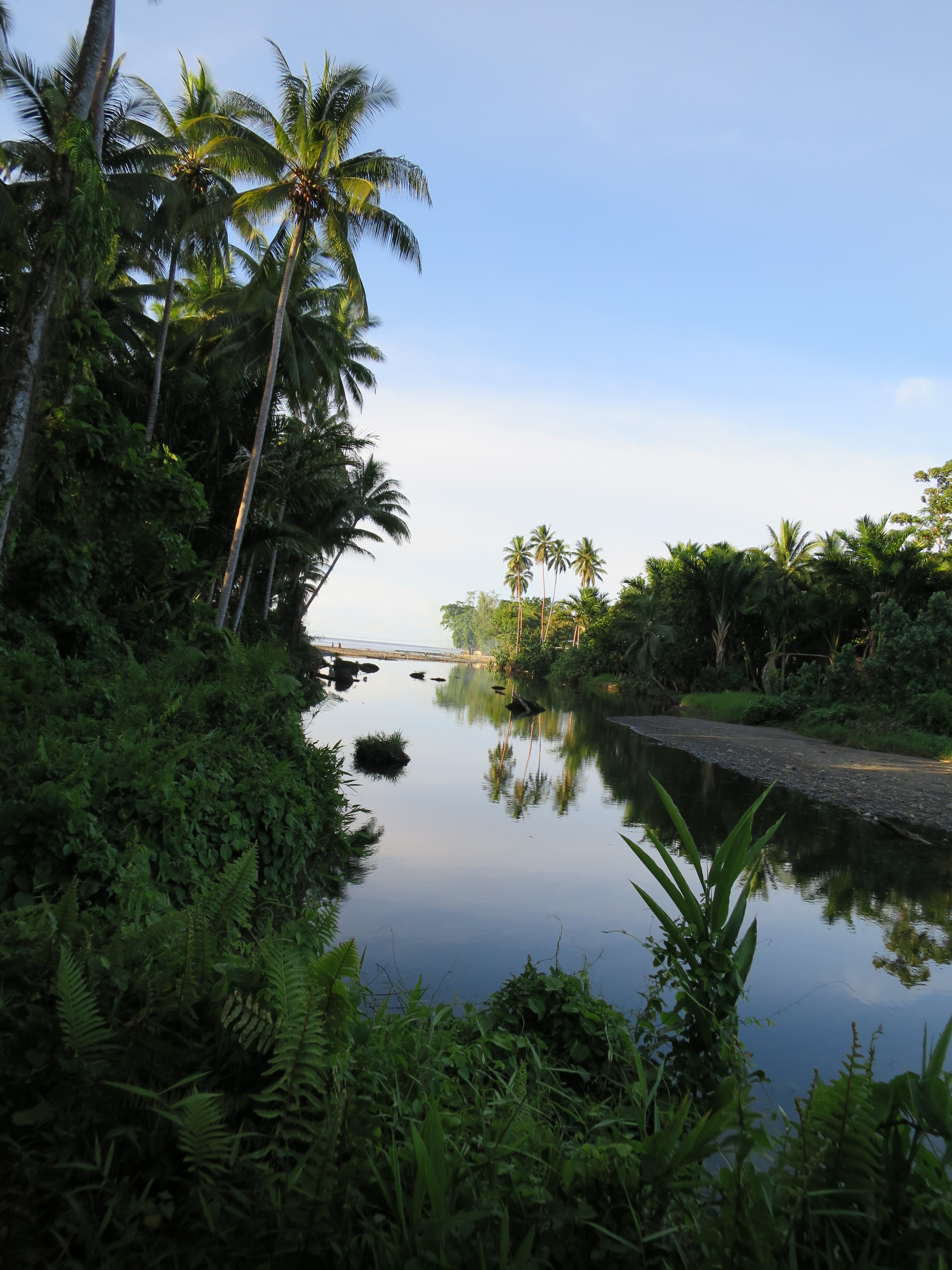
In the evening, following the river on the track to the local beach in Kirakira

Government salaries for positions in the Solomon Islands are very low in comparison to advanced economies. A school principal or medical doctor will likely earn around SI$80,000 per year (about US$9,920.02), with the nursing and other staff at the hospital earning much less. The cost of living, however, is very high in comparison. The majority of the economy is non-monetary, with approximately 80% of the population engaged in subsistence farming. Fishing is another industry. Fresh fish can be found each morning, along with fruit and vegetables, which are sold from the markets located on the bay in the center of Kirakira.

The diet available in Kirakira is traditional, and may have ensured that the problem of obesity, that is common in other Melanesian communities, is not as big a problem yet. There is concern that the diet is changing, with more cheap processed foods becoming available in stores, and that this might lead to future health effects.

Logging has been a controversial industry on Kirakira, with concerns expressed in the local community that natural resources were being harvested without any demonstrable benefit being returned to them. Regional Assistance Mission for Solomon Islands (RAMSI) built a number of new homes for the resident police force near the airport. The aid money from RAMSI has funded the construction of several new bridges, which has made transport to Kirakira more accessible. There are only government-owned motor vehicles on Makira Island. There is limited public transportation, which consists of a flat top truck. The cost of a bus ride is SI$10.

Kirakira is most known within Solomon Islands for its bananas. There are over 100 different varieties of banana. Fresh bananas are commonly available throughout the community. The community is recognising the importance of the banana to Makira Island by holding the first banana festival.

== Tourism ==
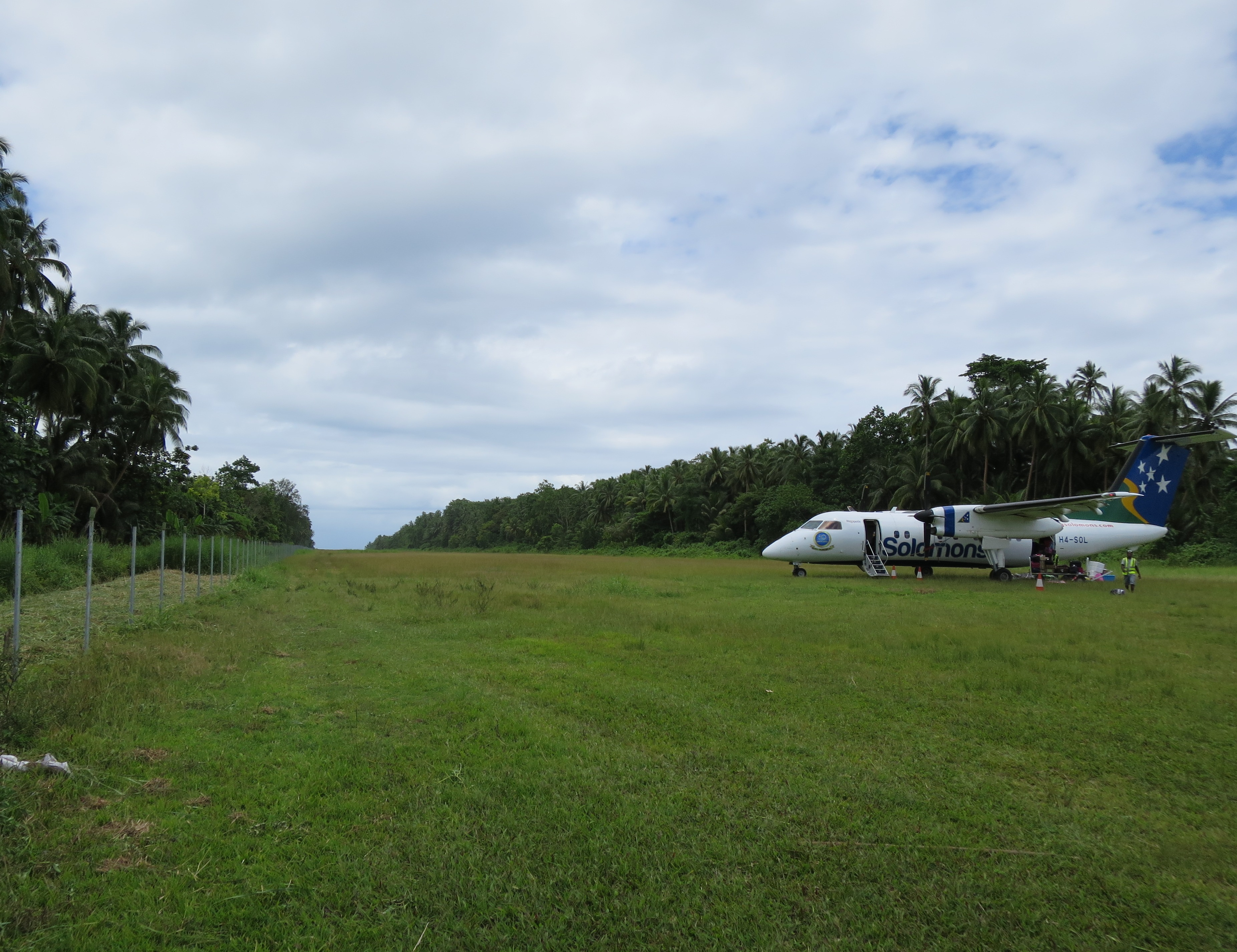
Runway at Kirakira airport

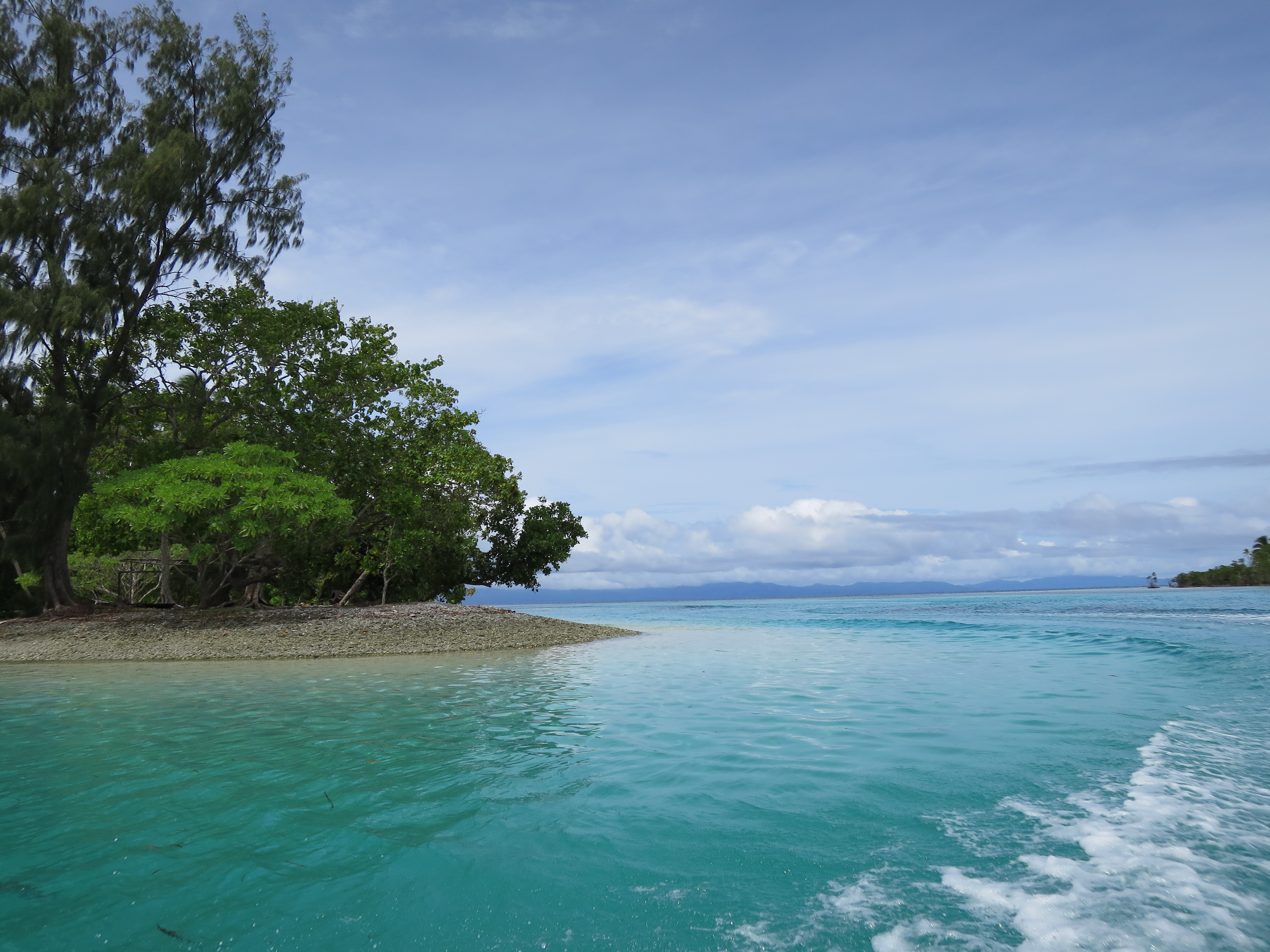
Approaching Three Sisters Island

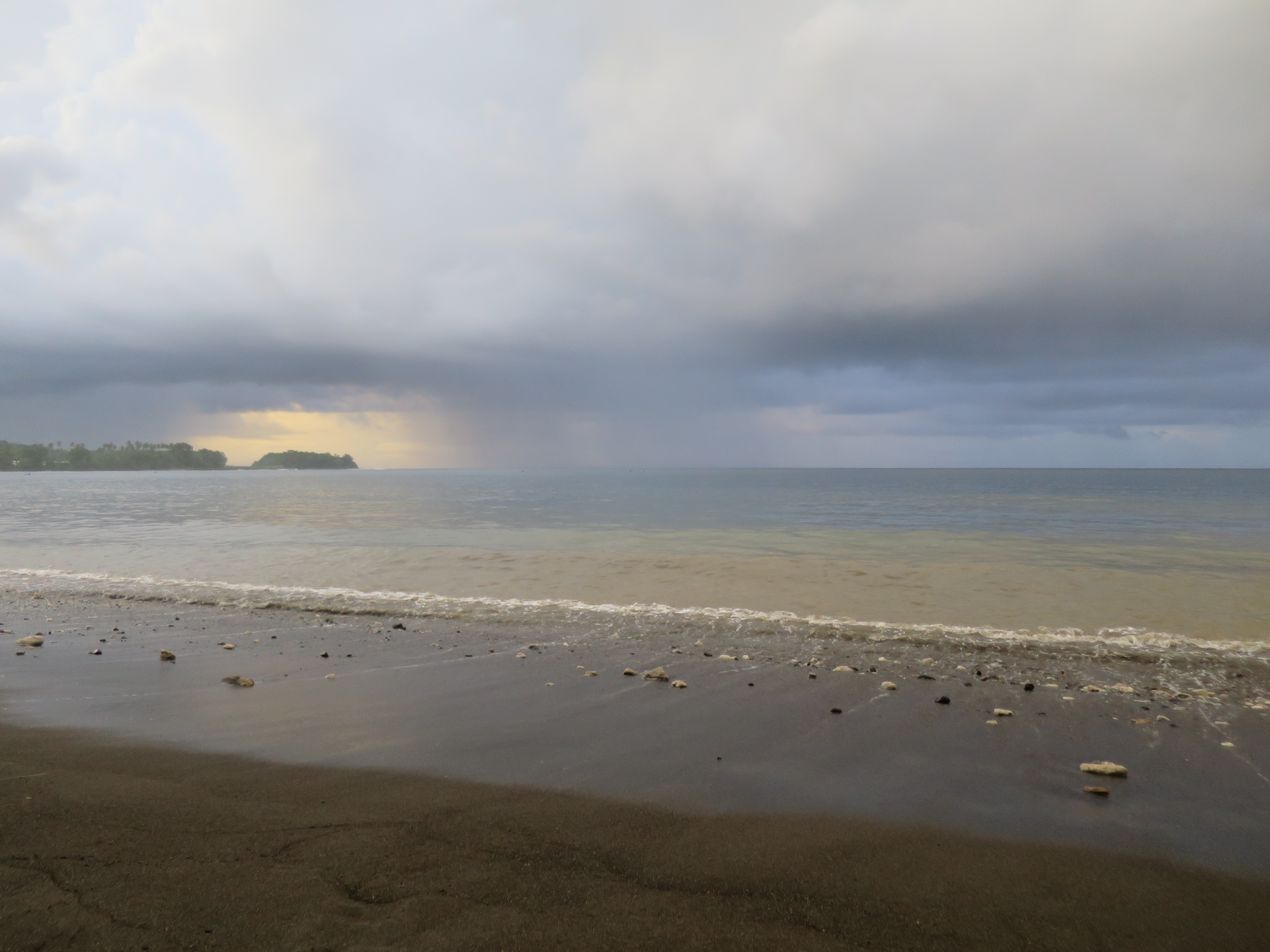
Local beach at Kirakira at sunset, when the rain was rolling in for another evening

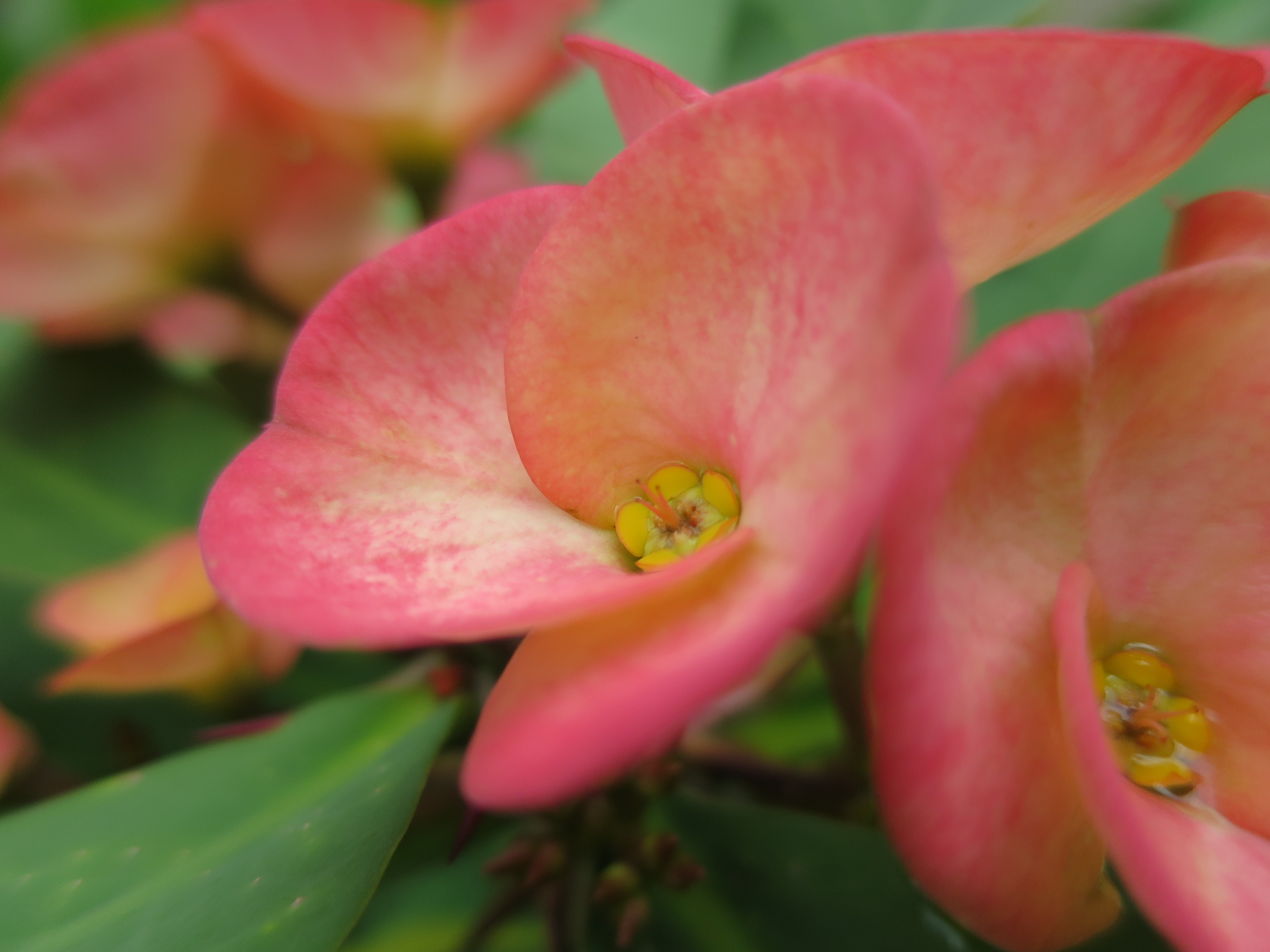
Flowers in local gardens in Kirakira

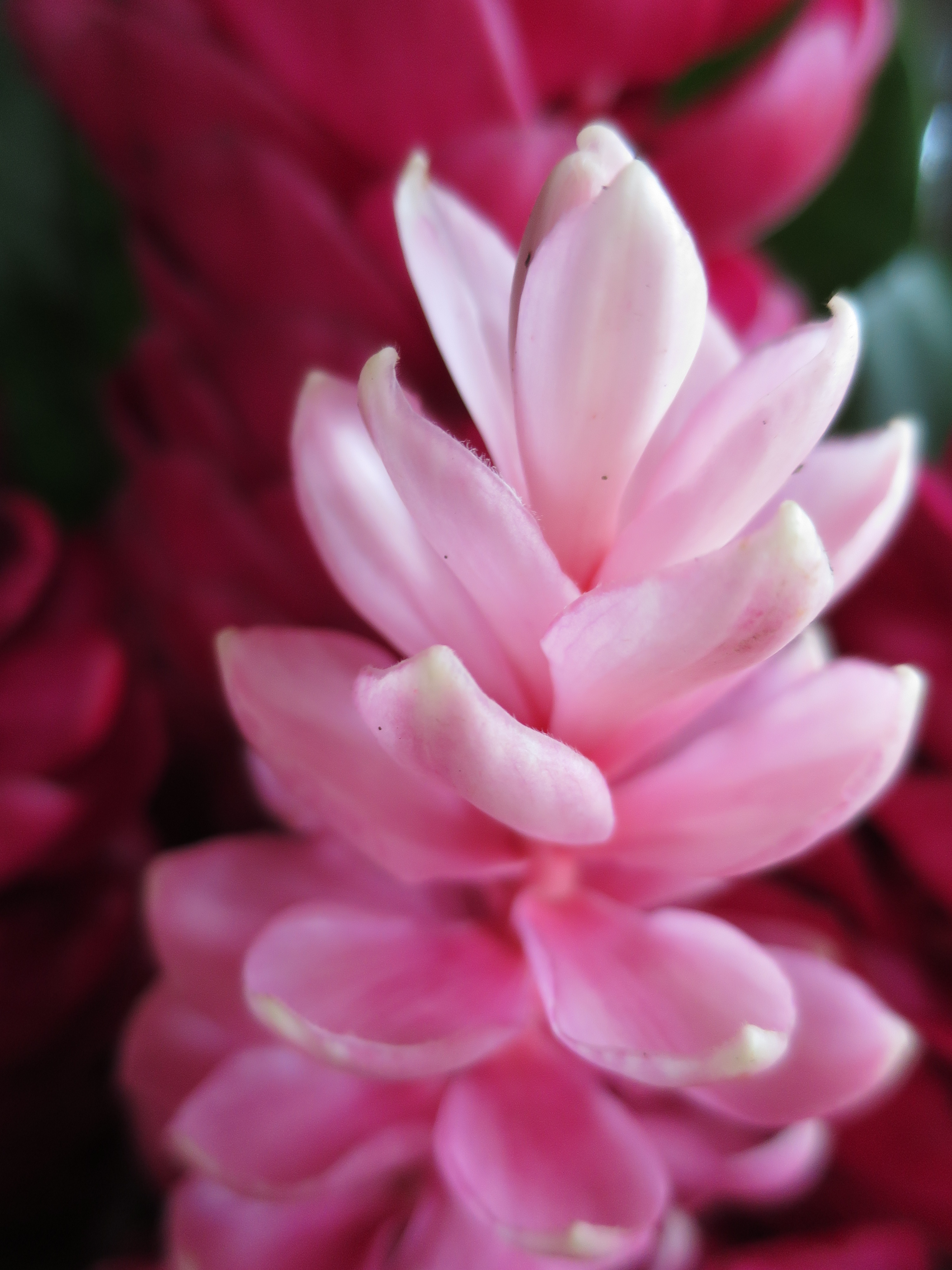
One of the many beautiful flowers in Kirakira

Kirakira is relatively unknown and receives very few visitors. A tourism industry is being developed in the community. There are unique surfing breaks on Makira Island with its black beaches and snorkeling in the islands just off Kirakira. Visitors typically swim at beaches on the Olu Malau Islands and Ugi Island. The nearby waters are dotted with coral reefs with an variety of species of tropical fish. The islands can be accessed by motor boat, and takes about 45–60 minutes from Kirakira harbour. There are many bird-watching trails.

Visitors need to take precautions to minimise the risk of catching malaria. These include taking appropriate chemoprophylaxis and engaging prophylactically with practices that prevent malaria. In the inland river systems, there are saltwater crocodiles and there have been instances of swimmers being bitten.

== Health care ==
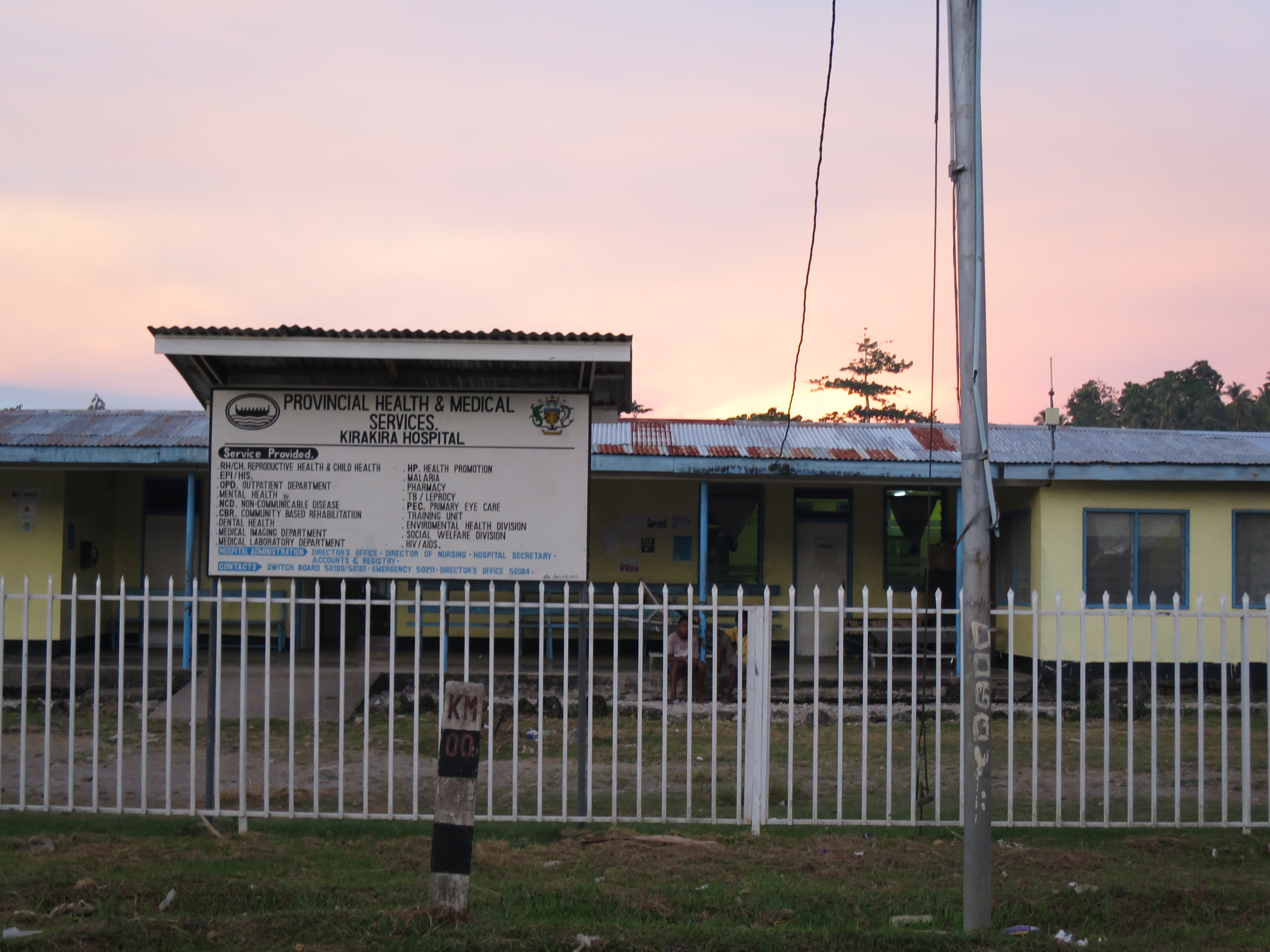
Front entrance of Kirakira Hospital at sunset

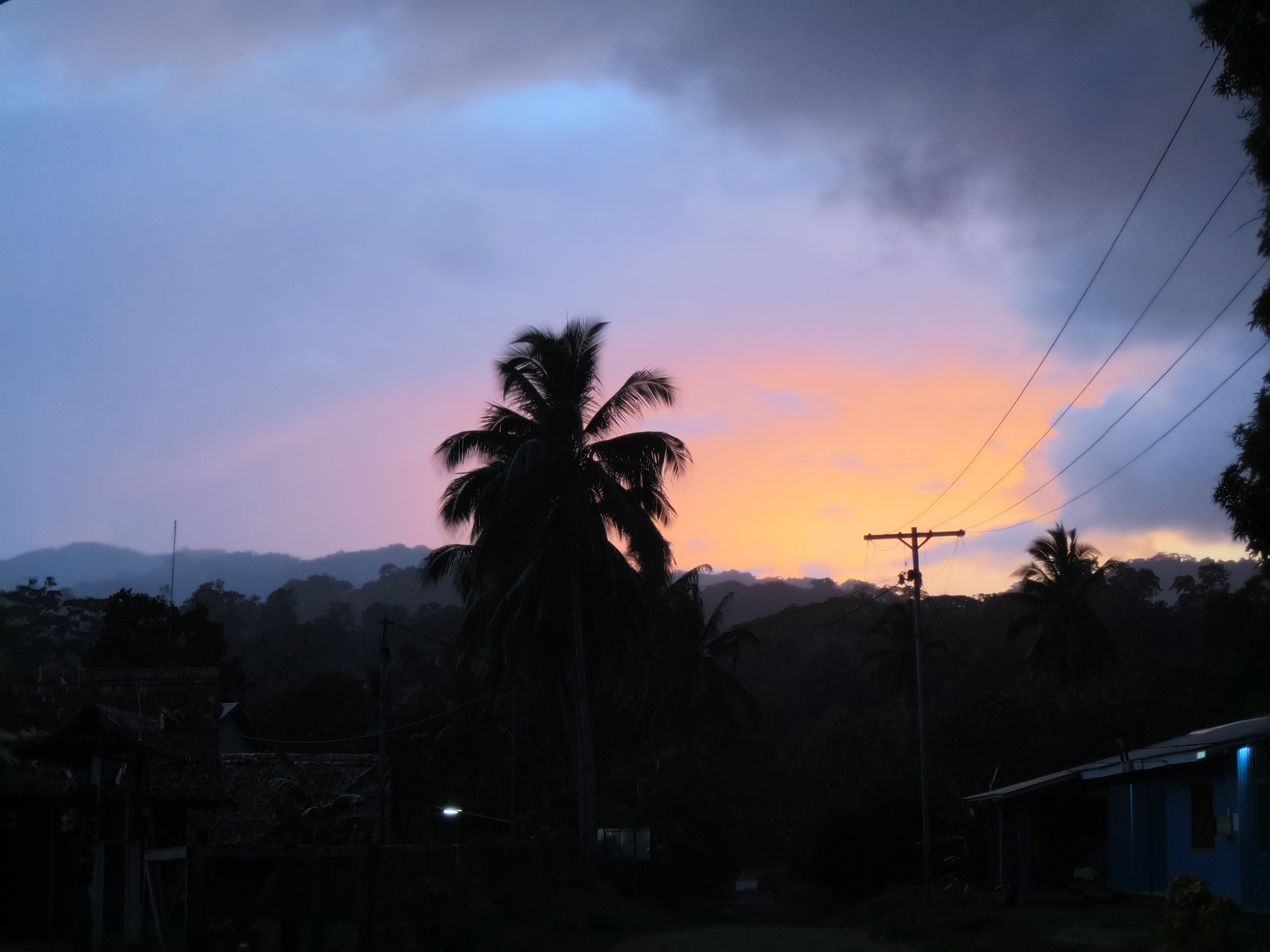
Evening view from the front entrance of Kirakira Hospital

There is a small 30-bed hospital in Kirakira. There is only one full-time government-employed doctor based at the hospital, who is supported by a team of about 40 nursing staff. There are two staff on a 2-year exchange program from Japan, that includes a registered nurse and a physiotherapist. With very limited resources, the hospital provides effective health care to the community. Children have access to a comprehensive immunisation schedule and there are midwives who provide antenatal care and assist with deliveries. There is the capacity to manage infectious diseases such as tuberculosis and malaria, which are common in Kirakira, with access to the appropriate medications to treat these infectious illnesses. Malaria remains an endemic problem. Over the summer of 2013/2014, approximately 75% of confirmed malaria cases were due to Plasmodium vivax and 25% of cases were due to the more dangerous Plasmodium falciparum.

The hospital does have simple radiography, an ultrasound machine and a limited number of blood tests. The hospital's pharmacy has good supplies of antibiotics, anti-malarials and a limited supply of analgesics and cardiorespiratory medications. There are oxygen cylinders. Ketamine sedation is available and allows for the doctor on the island to do a range of minor procedures such as drainage of abscesses and setting of simple fractures. There is an operating theatre. Complex cases are referred to the National Referral Hospital in Honiara and can be transported on one of the commercial flights that leaves the island each week. Patients who present for care will often be brought by their families for a medical consultation after trekking for two or three days. The most common cause of trauma in Kirakira is falling from a coconut tree.

The population of Makira province is growing rapidly due to a high birth rate. Women have an average of six children, with a high teenage pregnancy rate. There are efforts by the Health Service to encourage women after their fourth child to consider having a tubal ligation or for their husbands to have a vasectomy. There are also efforts to try and provide better secondary education for young girls to try to reduce the number of teenage pregnancies.

A grant from AusAide allowed for completion of an eye clinic facility at the hospital. It was opened by Andrew Byrnes, the Australian High Commissioner to Solomon Islands, on 28 February 2014.

== Bond University in Kirakira ==
Since the beginning of 2013, Australian final year medical students have been completing placements on Kirakira from Bond University. In 2014, the university received funding from the Australian government, through Health Workforce Australia, to allow physiotherapy, urban design and nutrition students to also complete work placements in Kirakira. The project has been very successful and for the last four years has continued to receive support from the Australian government through the New Colombo Plan. In 2018, the project was expanded to include law students. The project received a Faculty of Health Sciences and Medicine award for making an outstanding contribution to student learning in 2017. Over the last five years, there have been almost 200 students from across the university and 50 academic supervisors involved in a project that has provided direct aid and support to the community.

Students from other faculties of the university have visited Kirakira and completed repairs of the hospital's pharmacy and repainted the birthing suite, with a plan that further aid efforts and improvements would follow in 2014. A group of students formed a charity called The Strong Island Foundation, which has raised several thousand dollars for the community of Kirakira.

Several research papers have been published from the work conducted in Kirakira. These include a paper describing peer-to-peer supervision as a novel way of students being able to academically and practically support one another in this remote community. There have also been papers published on antenatal care, an audit of the obstetric ward, on coconut tree injuries sustained by children and a paper that highlights the high perinatal mortality rate of 31 per 1,000 live born deliveries that is an ongoing health problem in the rural regions of the province.

== Climate ==
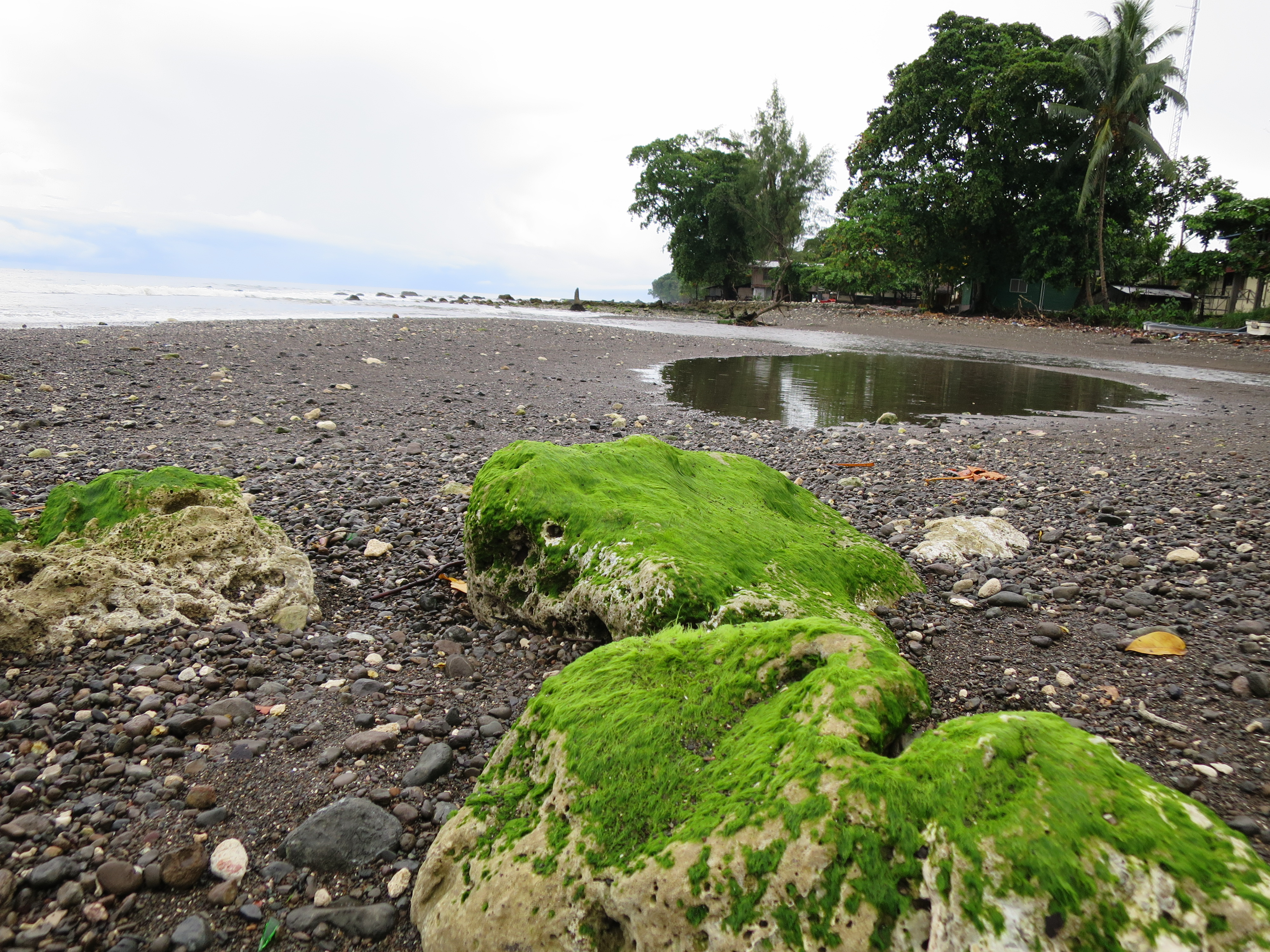
Beach at Kirakira

Climate data for Kirakira
Month	Jan	Feb	Mar	Apr	May	Jun	Jul	Aug	Sep	Oct	Nov	Dec	Year
Mean daily maximum °C (°F)	31 (87)	31 (87)	30 (86)	30 (86)	30 (86)	30 (86)	29 (85)	29 (85)	29 (85)	30 (86)	30 (86)	31 (87)	30 (86)
Mean daily minimum °C (°F)	23 (73)	23 (73)	23 (73)	23 (73)	23 (73)	22 (72)	22 (71)	22 (71)	22 (71)	22 (72)	22 (72)	23 (73)	22 (72)
Average precipitation mm (inches)	350 (13.7)	350 (13.8)	380 (15)	310 (12.3)	290 (11.4)	240 (9.3)	340 (13.3)	340 (13.5)	260 (10.2)	250 (9.9)	240 (9.3)	290 (11.5)	3,640 (143.2)
Source: Weatherbase
