= Heinrich Küper =

German adventurer

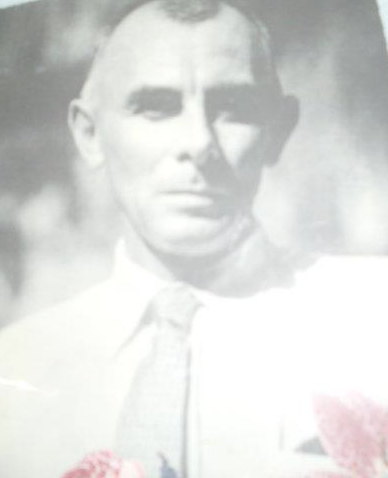
Heinrich Küper

Heinrich Küper (1888 in Hamburg Germany – 1950 in Owaraha) was a German adventurer who lived in the Solomon Islands.

== Biography ==
Küper lived in Gupuna village, Owaraha, Makira-Ulawa Province, between 1912 and 1950, the year of his death. He was a former officer of the Kaiserliche Marine who had deserted. During World War I Küper was arrested by the British authorities of the Solomon Islands protectorate and was brought to Tulagi. Very soon thereafter though, he was released after promising that he would not cooperate with the enemy.

Küper was married to a respected and influential local woman, Kafagamurirongo, and was the only aefaka (white) who ever reached the arafa (high person) status within a Melanesian community. His first child was born in 1917. Heinrich and Kafagamurirongo had a total of four children, three boys and a girl.

During his life in Owaraha he met ethnographer Hugo Bernatzik, who wrote a sympathetic report based on his own glimpses of Küper's life. According to Bernatzik, Küper had wholly adapted to the local island culture, which he respected and admired. According to Küper the customs of the Solomon Islanders were full of ancient wisdom, unfathomable to the European visitor, and in harmony (im Einklang) with their surroundings. Therefore, Küper mistrusted European influence as a whole, warning local people in Owaraha against certain missionaries, whom he accused of breaking down the ancestral authority structures and bringing about a moral breakdown, as well as against all Overseas Chinese traders, for he felt that non-traditional material possessions in the island context promoted greed and brought about conflict.

Even so, Küper insisted in observing Heiligabend (Christmas Eve) at his home every year with great pomp and solemnity, according to time-honored German tradition. Küper's Christmas celebrations in Owaraha included a special Christmas dinner attended by all islanders in full regalia, with presents for every guest. The meeting place was decorated matching the occasion and included as well a candle-lit Christmas tree Küper made himself using leaves and branches of local trees.

In the late 1940s Küper opposed the Maasina Ruru liberation movement and denounced its members to the British authorities who swiftly arrested them. Not long afterwards Küper died in mysterious circumstances.

== Legacy ==
After his death, Küper's fortune passed to his eldest son Geoffrey Küper, who later moved to Honiara. Both Geoffrey and his father were interested in ethnography, contributing with their work to the study of Solomon Island traditions.

Küper had introduced cows to Owaraha and ended up owning coconut plantations. He was a wealthy person, having added to his wife's wealth. In time the island ended up becoming christianized and opening to the market economy, Küper's influence having contributed to the prevailing acculturation, rather than to his avowed goal of the preservation of the traditional culture.

Küper's children have all died, but his grandchildren and greatgrandchildren still live in the Solomon Islands, some in Honiara and others in Owaraha.
