= Owariki =

Island in Solomon Islands

Owariki Santa Catalina
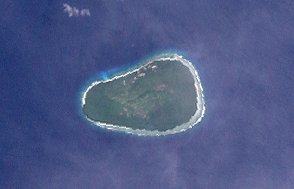
- Landsat picture of the island.

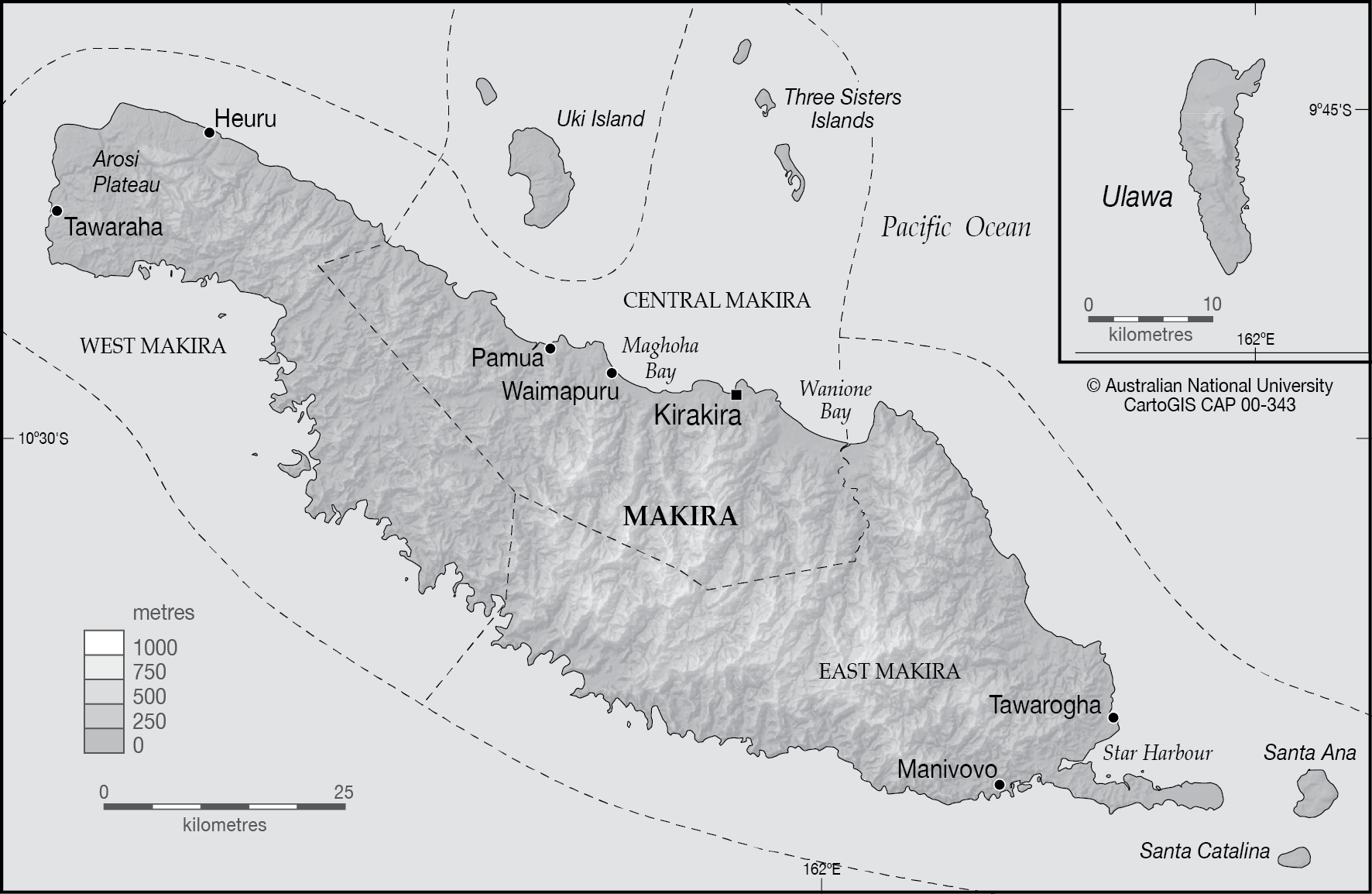
- Owariki (Santa Catalina) is located off the eastern end of Makira Island

- Location in Solomon Islands

Geography
- Location: South Pacific Ocean
- Coordinates: 10.892°S 162.446°E
- Archipelago: Solomon Islands (archipelago)
- Area: 5.62 km^{2} (2.17 sq mi)
- Highest elevation: 97 m (318 ft)

Administration
- Solomon Islands
- Province: Makira-Ulawa Province

Demographics
- Population: 811 (2009)

Owariki or Owa rigi (formerly Santa Catalina) is an island in Makira-Ulawa Province, Solomon Islands.

== Description ==
This small coral island is 2.8 km long and 2 km wide. It is located off the eastern end of Makira (San Cristobal) Island, separated from it by a 7.5 km wide strait, and just south of slightly larger Owaraha (Santa Ana) Island. The sound between Owaraha and Owariki is only 2.5 km wide.

The inhabitants of Owariki speak the Owa language. They share the same culture with the people on Owaraha and on the eastern end of Makira.

== History ==
First recorded sighting by Europeans was by the Spanish expedition of Álvaro de Mendaña on 4 July 1568. More precisely the sighting and also landing in Owariki was due to a local voyage done by a small boat, in the accounts the brigantine Santiago, commanded by Francisco Muñoz Rico and having Hernán Gallego as pilot. They charted it as Santa Catalina.

Owariki was visited, along with neighboring Owaraha, by the Austrian anthropologist and photographer Hugo Bernatzik in 1932. Bernatzik carefully documented daily life among the island people and published an ethnography a few years later.
