= Phooka =

Phooka may refer to:

- Púca, a creature of Celtic folklore
- Cow blowing, a disputed process to induce a cow to produce more milk
