= Pio Island =

Island in Solomon Islands

Coordinates: 10°10′S 161°41′E

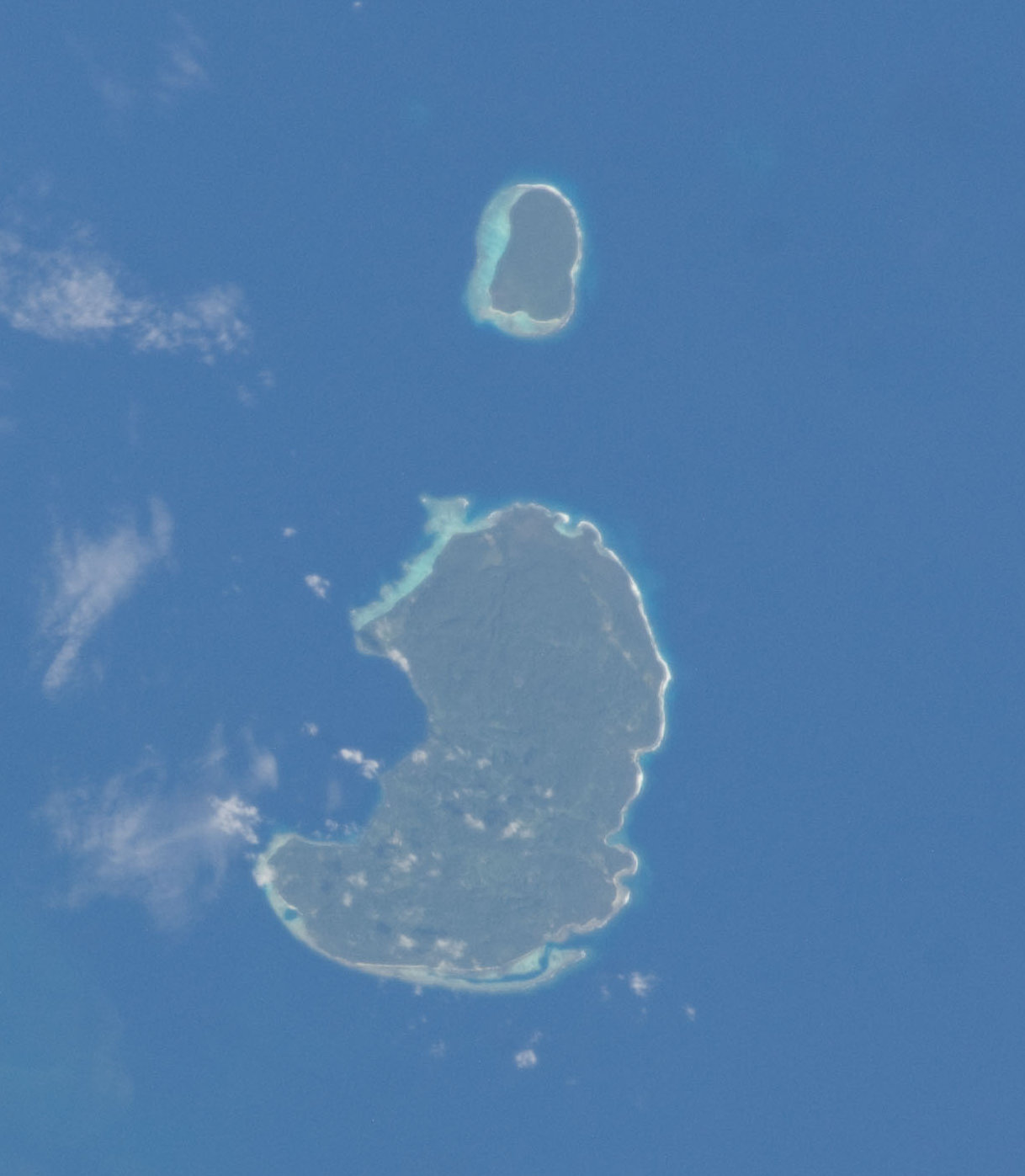
View of Uki ni Masi (larger) and Pio (smaller) islands in Solomon Islands

Pio Island is an island in Solomon Islands province of Makira-Ulawa. It is situated 4 km north-west of Ugi Island. It is 2.7 km long and 1.5 km wide. The estimated terrain elevation above sea level is some 227 metres. The island has no villages. Coral reef surrounds the island, which is largest in the west and south of the island.

== See also ==
- Oceania
- Pacific Islands
- Pacific Ocean
