= Lucy Kasimwane =

Business owner in the Solomon Islands

Lucy Kasimwane is a business owner in the Solomon Islands.

Kasimwane was born and raised in Ward 9 in the Makira-Ulawa Province of the Solomon Islands. She worked for the Australian government aid agency, AUSAID, and later resigned to start her own business. She is the owner of Lukasko Group, a private company involved in trading copra and wet cocoa beans.
