= Cow blowing =

Dubious process to induce a cow to produce more milk

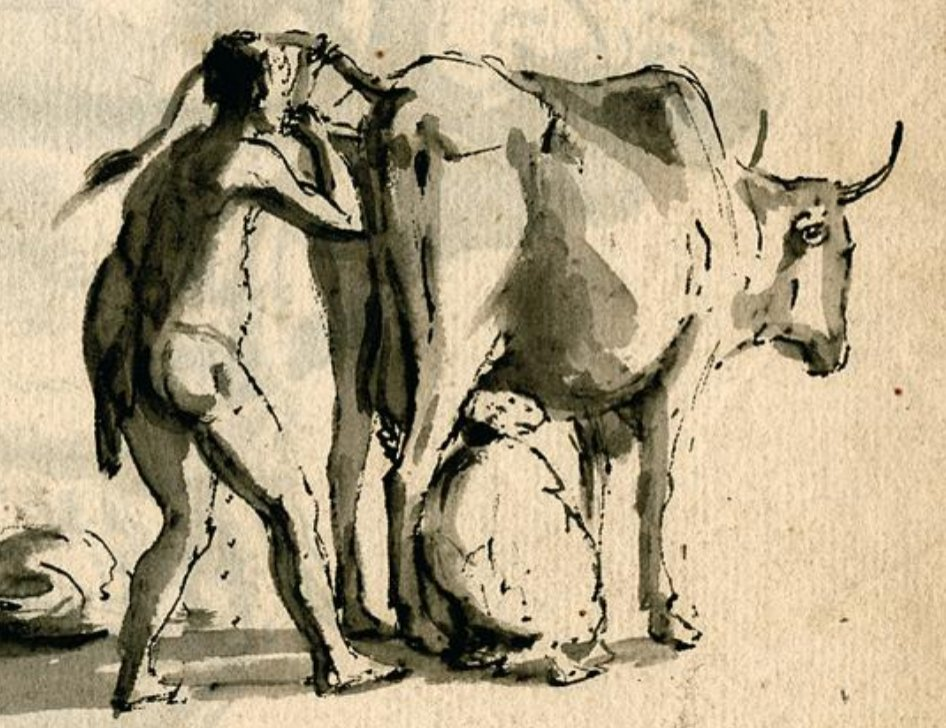
Drawing from an unknown author dated around 1700–1740

Cow blowing, Kuhblasen, phooka, or doom dev is a process in which a farmer forcefully blows air into a cow's vulva or anus to supposedly induce her to produce more milk. A tube may be used to provide some sanitary separation between the blower and the cow, although not every culture that practices cow blowing does so.

Information on the origin, spread and efficacy of this practice appears to be quite scarce. Depictions of this practice have been found on Saharan rock art in Libya and Algeria.

Cow blowing was the reason why Gandhi disliked dairy products, stating that "since I had come to know that the cow and the buffalo were subjected to the process of phooka, I had conceived a strong disgust for milk."

The practice has been illegal in New Zealand since 2018. In 2020 the New Zealand Dairy Industry Awards revoked their 'Share Farmer of the Year' award over a dairy farmer's tweets about the practice.

== Distribution according to Plischke (1954) ==
People	Area	Author	Year	See (also)	Other
Kalmyk	southern Russian steppe	Peter Simon Pallas	1776		
Scythians		Herodotus	5th century BC		(to horses)
Yakuts	Lena River (Siberia)	Gerhard Friedrich Müller	1736		
Ethiopians	Ethiopia	I. M. Hildebrandt	1874		
Kaffa		Friedrich J. Bieber	1920		
Nuer		H. A. Bernatzik	1929	E. E. Evans-Pritchard (1951); Luz H, Herz W (1976)	
Dinka		H. A. Bernatzik	1930		
Baggara Arabs	Kordofan	McMichael	1924		
Somali		C. Keller	1894		
Oromo		Ph. Paulischke	1893		
Wasiba (part of Haya people)	Kagera Region	H. Rehse	1910		Per Rehse, Wasiba insert their arm into the cow anus up the elbow for the same purpose
Turu people		E. Sick	1915		
Wagogo		H. Clauss	1911		
Khoikhoi	South Africa	Peter Kolb	1719		
Masa people	Logone area south of Chad	A. Rühe	1938		
Chinese	Tung River (China)	I. H. Edgar	1924		Dadu River (Sichuan province)
	India	T. Murari	1937	Mahatma Gandhi (1927/1929)	known locally as phooka
Alps (Untergurgl, upper Ötztal), Pfitscher Joch			1939		
Pyrenees			1939		

== Literature ==
- Hans Plischke: "Das Kuhblasen. Eine völkerkundliche Miszelle zu Herodot,' Zeitschrift für Ethnologie, Berlin: Reimer, Bd. 79, 1954, S. 1-7.
- H. A. Bernatzik: Zwischen Weißem Nil und Belgisch-Kongo. Wien 1929
- Isaac Schapera: The Khoisan Peoples of South Africa. London 1930
- Tadeusz Margul: "Present-Day Worship of the Cow in India." In: Numen, Vol. 15, No. 1 (Feb., 1968), pp. 63–80
- Florence Burgat: "Non-Violence Towards Animals in the Thinking of Gandhi: the Problem of Animal Husbandry." In: Journal of Agricultural and Environmental Ethics, Volume 17, Number 3 / Mai 2004, Seiten 223-248
- Hubert Kroll: "Das Zurückhalten der Milch bei Rindern und ihre Behandlung bei afrikanischen Hirtenstämmen." In: Milchwirtschaftliches Zentralblatt (1928), Jg. 57, Heft 22, S. 349-350
- Hubert Kroll: "Die Haustiere der Bantu." In: Zeitschrift für Ethnologie Bd. 60, S. 247-248
- Sture Lagercrantz: Contribution of the Ethnography of Africa. Lund: Håkan Ohlssons 1950 (mit Karte zur Verbreitung in Afrika, auch zur Verbreitung des milking with dummy-calves ("Melkens mit Kalbspuppen")
