= Mecistocephalus kurandanus =

Scientific classification
- Kingdom: Animalia
- Phylum: Arthropoda
- Subphylum: Myriapoda
- Class: Chilopoda
- Order: Geophilomorpha
- Family: Mecistocephalidae
- Genus: Mecistocephalus
- Species: M. kurandanus

Binomial name
- Mecistocephalus kurandanus Chamberlin, 1920

Species of centipede

Mecistocephalus kurandanus is a species of soil centipede in the family Mecistocephalidae. This centipede is endemic to Australia. This species features 49 pairs of legs and can reach 84 mm in length.

== Discovery ==
This species was first described in 1920 by the American biologist Ralph Vary Chamberlin. He based the original description of this species on multiple specimens including a holotype found by the American zoologist William Morton Wheeler in 1914 in the town of Kuranda on the Atherton Tableland of northeastern Queensland in Australia. This holotype is deposited in the Museum of Comparative Zoology at Harvard University.

== Description ==
This species features 49 leg pairs and can reach 84 mm in length and 3.2 mm in width. The body is brown with darker spots, and the head is chestnut. The dorsal plate on the head is 1.8 times as long as wide. The middle part of the labrum is shaped like a wedge that tapers to a narrow point at the posterior end. The side pieces of the labrum nearly touch each other behind the middle part. The posterior margin of the side pieces feature conspicuous notches that form seven or eight projections near the middle part of the labrum. The mandible features nine lamellae, with six teeth of similar length on the first lamella. The other lamellae feature distal teeth that are longer than the proximal teeth. The groove on the sternites is forked at the anterior end, with the two branches forming nearly right angles. The basal elements of the ultimate legs feature numerous small pores.

This species shares many traits with another species of Mecistocephalus found in Queensland, M. simplex. For example, as in all species in this genus, the head in each of these two species is evidently longer than wide, and the sternites of the trunk segments in each species feature a groove. Furthermore, like most species in this genus, these two species each feature 49 leg-bearing segments. Moreover, the groove on the sternites in both species is forked, and both species feature numerous small pores on the ultimate legs.

The species M. kurandanus can be distinguished from M. simplex, however, based on other traits. For example, the posterior margin of the side pieces of the labrum feature notches in M. kurandanus that are absent in M. simplex. Furthermore, the branches of the groove on the sternites form obtuse angles in M. simplex but more rectangular angles in M. kurandanus.

== Distribution and ecology ==
The species M. kurandanus is found in coastal northeastern Queensland in Australia. In Queensland, this species has been recorded not only at the type locality (Kuranda) but also on Mount Spurgeon at an elevation between 3,500 and 5,000 feet. This centipede is a solitary terrestrial predator that inhabits plant litter and soil.
