= Ali'ite =

Island in Solomon Islands

Coordinates: 10.1396°S 161.9253°E

Ali'ite is an island in Solomon Islands; it is the northern one of the Olu Malau (Three Sisters) Islands located in Makira-Ulawa Province. It has an area of 2.91 km^{2}.

The first recorded sighting by Europeans of Ali'ite was by the Spanish expedition of Álvaro de Mendaña in May 1568. More precisely the sighting of Ali'ite was due to a local voyage that set out from Guadalcanal in a small boat, in the accounts the brigantine Santiago, commanded by Alférez Hernando Énriquez and having Hernán Gallego as pilot. They charted the three Olu Malau islands as Las Tres Marias (The Three Marys in Spanish).
