= Hermann Mückler =

Austrian anthropologist and political scientist

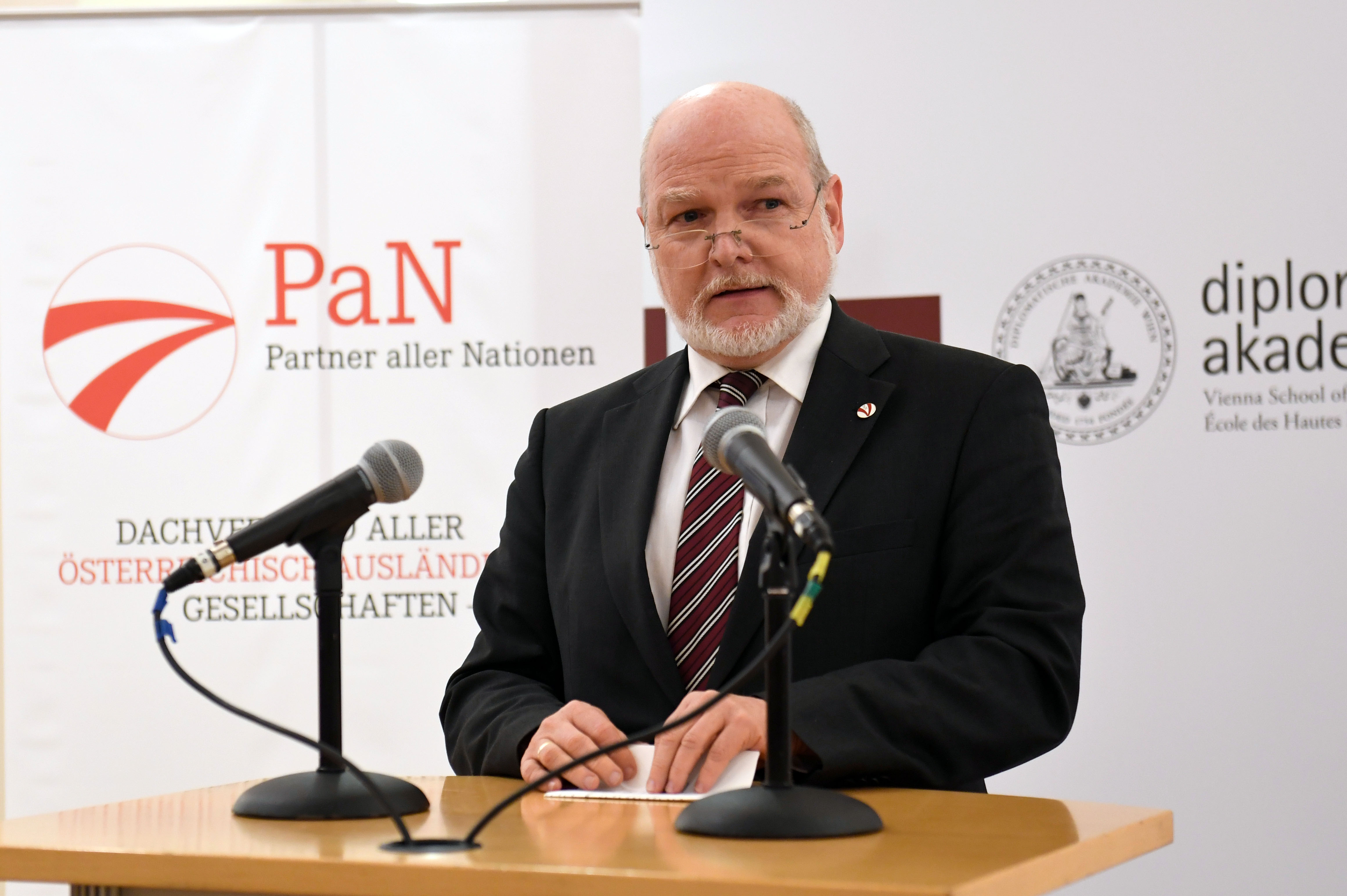
Univ.-Prof. Dr. Hermann Mückler, President of the PaN Society

Hermann N. Mückler (Hermann Mueckler, born 8 March 1964 in Vienna, Austria) is an Austrian anthropologist, political scientist and historian, specialized on the Asia-Pacific region, with a focus on Oceania (Pacific Islands), especially Fiji, Melanesia, and Polynesia.

== Biography ==
Born in Vienna of Austrian-Moravian ancestry, Hermann Mückler studied anthropology and political science at the University of Vienna. He received a PhD in 1997 with a thesis on „Taukei und Vulagi; Reasons for political instability in Fiji. Culture change, ethnic conflicts and the importance of the chiefly system; the Fijian perspective“ (original in German). His habilitation took place in 2001 with a thesis „Finis Tui Viti? Transformation and decay of traditional structure of power in Fiji as a consequence of internal and outside dynamics“ (original in German). Two books in German language published in 1998 and 2001 about political developments in Fiji attracted wide attention and led him to be estimated as one of the leading experts about Fiji and the surrounding regions in Europe. Since 1987 extended travel and field work in the Asia-Pacific region. In 1994 starting as University Assistant, he became University Professor in 2001. From 2004 to 2008 he was Vicedean of the Faculty of Social Sciences of the University of Vienna. In 1996 he founded the Austrian-South Pacific Society (Österreichisch-Suedpazifische Gesellschaft, OSPG), the one and only scientific institution dealing with the Pacific islands in Austria, and in 2002, together with Prof. Erich Lehner from the Univ. of Technology, Vienna, the Institute for Comparative Research in Architecture (ICRA). Hermann Mückler is Chief-Editor of the book series „Novara - Contributions to Research on the Pacific“ and project coordinator of „Escape to the South Seas? Austrian emigration to New Zealand and the Pacific Islands“.

== Academic Positions ==
- Univ. Professor (ao) (since 2001)
- President of the Austrian-South Pacific Society (OSPG) (since 1996)
- Vice-President of the Institute for Comparative Research in Architecture (ICRA) (since 2002)
- Vice-President of the Anthropological Society of Vienna (since 2003)
- Director of the Studies Programme Office (since 2006)
- Vice-Dean of the Faculty of Social Sciences, Univ. of Vienna (2004–2008)
- President/Chairman of the European Society for Oceanists (ESfO) (1999–2002)
- Chief-Editor of the „Wiener Ethnohistorischen Blätter“ (2000–2004)
- Chief-Editor of the publication series „Novara – Beiträge zur Pazifikforschung“
- Co-Editor of the „Journal of Comparative Cultural Studies“ (JCCS)
- Guest lectures and chairs in Brunel, Mainz, Paris, Zürich, Bayreuth, Ljubljana, etc.
- Member of several boards and academic institutions

== Scientific Focus ==
- Peace and Conflict Studies
- Ethnohistory, Historical Anthropology
- Political Anthropology
- Migration
- Colonialism
- Social aspects of indigenous architecture
- Anthropological interpretation of historical sources
- Specialized on the region Asia-Pacific, Oceania, Melanesia, Polynesia, Fiji, South-East Asia, Indian Ocean, Central Europe.

== Selected publications ==
- Hermann Mückler, Werner Zips, Manfred Kremser (Hrsg.): Ethnohistorie. Empirie und Praxis. Wien 2006: Wiener Universitätsverlag.
- Hermann Mückler: Unwanted Neighbours: Implications, Burdens and the Instrumentalization of Migration: Relations between American Samoa and the Republic of Samoa. In: Ferro, Katarina u. Margot Wallner (eds.): Migration Happens. Reasons, Effects and Opportunities of Migration in the South Pacific. Novara, Vol. 4 (6), Hamburg/Münster: Lit-Verlag, S.63-81
- Hermann Mückler: Republic of Palau, Federated States of Micronesia, Cook Islands, American Samoa, Marshall Islands. In: Gieler, Wolfgang/Kemal, Inal/Claudio Kullmann (Hrsg.): Foreign Policy of States. A Handbook of World Affairs. Istanbul 2005: Tassam Publications.
- Erich Kolig, Hermann Mückler (eds.): Politics of Indigeneity in the South Pacific. Recent Problems of Identity in Oceania. Hamburg 2002: LIT-Verlag.
- Hermann Mückler: Back to the Chessboard: The Coup and the Re-Emergence of Pre-colonial Rivalries in Fiji. In: Kolig/Mückler (eds.): Politics of Indigeneity in the South Pacific. Hamburg: LIT-Verlag, S. 143-158
- Ferdinand Karl, Hermann Mückler: Oasen der Südsee: Die größten Kleinststaaten der Welt. Ostmikronesien: Marshall-Inseln, Gilbert-Inseln, Nauru. Gnas 2002: Weishaupt Verlag.
- Hermann Mückler: Fidschi. Das Ende eines Südseeparadieses. Wien 2001: Promedia Verlag.
- Hermann Mückler: Melanesien in der Krise. Ethnische Konflikte, Fragmentierung und Neuorientierung. Wien 2000: Univ. Wien.
- Hermann Mückler: Fidschi. Zwischen Tradition und Transformation. Frankfurt/Main 1998: IKO-Verlag.
- Andre Gingrich, Hermann Mückler: An encounter with recent trends in German-speaking Anthropology; Review Article on the September 1995 meeting in Vienna. In: Social Anthropology, Vol.5, Part 1, S.83-90, Cambridge 1997.
