= Owa language =

Austronesian language spoken in Solomon Islands

Owa
- Santa Ana
- Region: Solomon Islands
- Native speakers: (8,400 cited 1999)
- Language family: Austronesian: Malayo-Polynesian; Oceanic; Southeast Solomonic; Owa
- Dialects: Tawarafa; Owa Raha; Owa Riki

Language codes
- ISO 639-3: stn
- Glottolog: owaa1237

The Owa language is one of the languages of Solomon Islands. It is part of the same dialect continuum as Kahua, and shares the various alternate names of that dialect.

== Description ==
Owa is a member of the Southeast Solomonic languages and is spoken in the southern part of the island of Makira as well as the Owaraha and Owariki islands in the Solomon Islands. It was formerly called Santa Ana, under which name several Anglican publications of the Church of the Province of Melanesia have been printed in this language from 1938 to the present.

The Owa language, also known as Kahua, is one of approximately 70 languages spoken in the Solomon Islands. Owa has roughly 8,000 speakers in total, residing in the islands of Santa Anna, Santa Catalina, and Star Harbour of San Cristobal. Each location consists of a separate dialect. All three locations are categorized under the Makira province, which is the home of the Owa language.

Owa is a Central Eastern Oceanic language and can be categorized as a branch of the Austronesia family. The Austronesian language family is rather large and expands from the Pacific Islands to Madagascar. There are roughly 60 Austronesian languages spoken in the Solomon Islands.

== Phonology ==
The Owa language consists of nineteen phonemes, which are written using twenty letters. Of these nineteen phonemes, fourteen are consonants and five are vowels.

=== Consonants ===
The consonants can be separated into four different categories: labial (sound produced with the lips), alveolar (produced with the upper teeth), velar (produced with the back of the tongue), and glottal (produced with the glottis).

Consonants
		Labial	Alveolar	Velar	Glottal
Nasal		ŋ͡m, m	n	ŋ	
Stop	plain	p	t	k	
Stop	implosive	ɓ			
Fricative		f	s	ɣ	h
Vibrant			ɾ		
Approximant		w			

Owa distinguishes the following matters of articulation: voiceless stops, voiced stops, vibrants, voiceless fricatives, voiced fricatives, nasals, and approximants. Although there are velar consonants, there are no voiced velar or alveolar stops. However, Owa does feature the voiced fricative [ɣ] in lieu of a voiced velar stop.

Furthermore, there are lengthened segments used to distinguish semantic meaning, as in ssss, used to mean ‘yes, I agree’.

=== Vowels ===
The Owa language consists of 5 phonemic vowels, /ɪ, ʊ, ɛ, ɔ, ɐ/, separated in three categories: front (/ɪ, ɛ/), central (/ɐ/), and back (/ɔ, ʊ). Long and short vowels are used to distinguish tense.

Vowels
	Front	Central	Back
Close	ɪ		ʊ
Mid-Open	ɛ		ɔ
Open		ɐ	

While vowels can be nasalized before nasal consonants, this nasalization is not phonemic.

=== Stress ===
Usually, the second-to-last syllable is stressed in the Owa language, e.g., auragi /ɐʊ.ˈɾɐ.gɪ/ 'married'. But occasionally the antepenultimate (third-to-last) syllable is stressed, as in fefene /ˈfɛ.fɛ.nɛ/ 'female'. However, stress placement depends on the context, specifically where it is located in the sentence; therefore, it is difficult to predict stress patterns in Owa.

== Orthography ==
Mellow (2013) uses the following orthography:

IPA	Orthography
ɐ	A a
(Note: Mellow doesn't provide a pronunciation.)	B b (Note: used in loanwords, e.g., bia 'beer')
ɛ	E e
f	F f
ɣ	G g
h	H h
ɪ	I i
	J j (Note: used in loanwords, e.g., jenreeta 'generator')
k	K k
	L l (Note: used in loanwords, e.g., lo 'law')
m	M m
ŋ͡m	MW mw
n	N n
ŋ	NG ng
ɔ	O o
p	P p
ɓ	Q q
ɾ	R r
s	S s
t	T t
ʊ	U u
w	W w

== Morphology ==
=== Nouns phrases ===
Generally speaking, nouns in Owa are simple; however, the pronouns and markers used with them are more complex and provide more details. While English only distinguishes singular and plural number, Owa distinguishes singular, dual, and plural, which is a characteristic of most Oceanic languages. Pronouns have both inclusive, which include the speaker, and exclusive forms, which exclude the speaker. Like nouns, pronouns also fall into three separate categories: singular, dual, and plural.

Similar to Romance languages like Spanish, Owa has gender-specific articles.

- Male names are accompanied with the article o or ko.
- Female names are preceded by the fused article ka-.

Object suffixes also serve to establish the person and number. Examples are –au for the 1st person singular exclusive, and –go for the 2nd person singular.

Alienable and inalienable nouns are distinguished. The former category is related to ownership, while the latter is restricted to nouns denoting body parts or intimate people. Inalienable nouns that are distinguished by possessive suffixes. Alienable nouns are not directly suffixed when possessed; rather, the possessive suffix appears on a classifier. For example, in naefe ia-ku 'my knife', the first person singular possessive affix -ku is attached to the classifier ia-. In some cases alienability is difficult to determine.

Among the classifiers that are used in possessive phrases in Owa, the languages distinguish between edible and drinkable possessions.

- Edible possession: -qa, -mwa, -na
- Non-edible (general) possession: -ku, -mu, -na/ni

=== Adjectives ===
Owa has a closed class of only a few adjectives:

- kere 'small' appears before the noun
- faoru 'new', mafana 'hot', and masuri 'black' all appear after the noun and can function as verbs

Because Owa only consists of a few adjectives, other means are used to describe nouns. To name a few, articles, clauses and particles serve to transform nouns.

The constituent order within a noun phrase is (specifier) (ADJ) Head (ADJ) (modifier construction) (DEM) (ana). The specifier acts as an article and the head is the noun. The modifier construction includes either a number, possession or relative clause which is used to describe the noun preceding because the adjectives are relatively vague.

=== Adverbs ===
The word mi, translates to 'and' and can also take the form of me. Mi can act as an adverb by preceding the verb. For example, meau, mia is the singular form, and mego, migo is the second person form. The adverb usually serves as accompaniment or cooperation.

=== Conjunctions ===
Conjunctions have both male and female forms in Owa, which is a characteristic that rarely appears in Oceanic languages. There are separate words to indicate whether the conjunction is conjoining a feminine or a masculine entity. mo is followed by males, mika is followed by females, and mina, mana are followed by non-human entities.

Jon mika Mary mo Pita
John and Mary and Peter
'John, Mary, and Peter'

== Verbs ==
There are four main types of verbs: one-place verbs, two-place verbs, noun-modifiers, and adverbs

- One-place verbs:

A niu kana ke tewa wau
ART coconut DEM.4.SG 3SG:REAL tall very
'That coconut palm is very tall.'

- Two-place verbs:

For example, sino-a 'sweep it' is from sino 'to sweep'.

Fefene gaa ke manai sino.
woman DEM.1.PL 3SG:REAL not sweep
'These women did not sweep.'

Ui sino-a.
2SG:IRR sweep.
'(You) sweep it.'

- Noun-modifiers:

A-oqa-na ke qote.
ART-belly-3SG 3SG:REAL protrude
'His belly protrudes'

Ui qote-a ka oqa-mu.
2SG:IRR protrude-3SG:REAL ART belly-3SG
'(You) push out your belly.'

== Works cited ==
- Mellow, Greg (2013). A Dictionary of Owa: A Language of the Solomon Islands. Pacific Linguistics. Vol. 639. De Gruyter Mouton. doi:10.1515/9781614513612. ISBN 9781614513988.
