= Aio Island =

Island in the Solomon Islands

Coordinates: 9°01′53″S 161°12′02″E

Aio Island or Aiyo Island, also known as Renny Island, is an island located 240 km to the north-east from Malandgo, of the Solomon Islands.

== Population ==
This Aio village has a population of 100 people.

== Geographical features ==
The estimated level above the sea is 15 metres (49 feet).

== Travel ==
The closest airport to Aio Island is Uru Harbour Airport located 40 km away.

== See also ==
- Duff Islands
- Pigeon Island (Solomon Islands)
- New Georgia Islands
