= Hugo Bernatzik =

Austrian anthropologist, writer and photographer

- Born: Hugo Adolf Bernatzik; 1897; Vienna
- Died: 1953 (aged 55–56); Vienna
- Occupation: Anthropologist
- Years active: 1924-1947
- Known for: Fieldwork in Tropical Africa, Southeast Asia and Melanesia
- Notable work: Die Große Völkerkunde.

Hugo Adolf Bernatzik (26 March 1897 – 9 March 1953, born and died in the city of Vienna) was an Austrian anthropologist and photographer. Bernatzik was the founder of the concept of alternative anthropology.

== Early life ==
Hugo Adolf Bernatzik was a son of the Professor of Public Law at the University of Vienna and member of the House of Peers, Edmund Bernatzik (1854–1919). After school in 1915, he volunteered to join the Austro–Hungarian Army and was deployed among other places in Albania.

== Career ==
In 1920, he abandoned his medical studies for financial reasons and became a businessman. After the early death of his first wife Margarete Ast (1904–1924), he embarked on extensive travels and expeditions taking photographs, which became his profession and passion: Spain and north–west Africa in 1924; Egypt and Somalia in 1925; Anglo-Egyptian Sudan in 1927; Romania and Albania between 1926 and 1930; Portuguese Guinea in 1930–1931 (with Bernhard Struck, Museum of Ethnology, Dresden); British Solomon Islands, British New Guinea, as well as Bali in Indonesia in 1932–1933; Swedish Lapland in 1934; Burma, Thailand and French Indochina (Vietnam, Laos, Cambodia) in 1936–1937; and, French–Morocco in 1949–1950.

Bernatzik financed his research and living expenses as a travel writer and freelance scientist, by publishing photo coverages, giving public slide lectures and purchasing collections for ethnological museums in Germany and Switzerland. His journalistic activity and his exceptional photographs of foreign people made him quite prominent. He prepared a worldwide photo archive of remote tribal people considered as threatened. With regard to colonial policies, Bernatzik argued that colonial administrators should take the customs, way of life and the tribal environment into account. In 1927, he married Emmy Winkler (1904–1977), a psychology student in Vienna, who became his assistant and travel companion. From 1930 on, he studied ethnology, anthropology and geography at the University of Vienna and completed a PhD doctorate in 1932 with a "monograph of the Kassanga". In June 1935, he applied for his postdoctoral habilitation to the University of Graz to be a professor based on the work he had done on "The development of the child on the Solomon Island of Owa Raha". He received confirmation from the Austrian Federal Ministry in May 1936 in Rangoon. Finally, at the beginning of 1939, he was appointed at the University of Graz to the Institute of Geography. Plans for another expedition to the Chinese province of Yunnan were cut short by Hitler's attack on Poland in September 1939.

Persistent speculation and rumours were aired regarding Bernatzik's role during the Third Reich and the Second World War. At the beginning of the war, Bernatzik was recruited into the Armed Forces and was stationed in Wiener Neustadt as a training officer for Air Defense. However, in explicit opposition to this war, he attempted everything possible to be released from this service, in order to publish a handbook on Africa. This project was designed to give colonial officers and European settlers a basic knowledge about the countries and their people. It was commissioned the NSDAP Office of Colonial Policy whose leader, Franz Ritter von Epp had been a general in Africa during the First World War. Impressed by Bernatzik's work, Ritter von Epp provided him with several recommendations during the war, which classified the Handbook of Africa as "war strategic material", despite the fact that the authorities in Berlin had quickly lost interest in the "colonial question". The protection of the general allowed Bernatzik, as well as many of his collaborators, to survive the war without too much loss.

However, none of Bernatzik's expeditions were in connection with any German colonial claim. The destinations, the data and his research interests make this evident. During the war, Bernatzik also worked on the completion of his most important publication, a monograph of Akha and Miao. Between 1940 and 1942, he travelled repeatedly to occupied Paris to cooperate with French ethnologists and to access various colonial archives for his work. He tried as far as possible to help persecuted colleagues at the Musee de l'Homme and to prevent the vandalism of archives and collections. Both completed manuscripts, the Africa Handbook and the monograph of Akha and Miao, were destroyed by a bomb attack damaging the Bibliographisches Institut of Leipzig in December 1943; moreover, all negatives of his photo archives burned in 1944, after a bombing of a railway station. Nevertheless, Bernatzik managed to publish without any textual change the "Handbook of Afrika" as well as "Akha and Miao" in 1947. The term "colonial ethnology" had already been replaced in 1944 with "applied ethnology".

Contrary to occasional assertions that Bernatzik had been an early member of the NSDAP, forbidden in Austria until the Anschluss in March 1938, his correspondence and documents from 1923 to 1944, which are accessible in the Vienna Library, prove that he joined the NSDAP on May 1, 1938. At the time, however, Austrians eager to join the party were restricted to new membership. Therefore, Bernatzik used a manipulated certificate referring to his alleged services provided for the party since 1933. This letter was attested to by a former school colleague, who had become a party official. Nonetheless Bernatzik's work, his research and position manifest no affinity whatsoever to Nazi Party ideology. Regardless of how one may judge his work today, at no time did it disclose NS propaganda. He never took any official position in the NS regime nor was he expected to do so. Despite this, from a current perspective, his lack of dissociation and some of his contacts can be legitimately criticized. But from his point of view during that epoch, he obviously considered his behavior as inevitable, as a means to proceed with his work and to defend himself against various denunciations, to which he was very exposed. As a freelance ethnologist, photographer and travel journalist the only possibility for him to escape the constraints of the regime would have been exile.

Hugo Bernatzik lived with his family in Heiligenstadt, Vienna in a villa commissioned by his father in 1911, built by the architect Josef Hoffmann and furnished by artists from the Wiener Werkstätte.

== Death and legacy ==
Bernatzik died in 1953 after many years of a tropical disease at the age of 56 years. He left important photographic work, accessible in Vienna at the Photographic Institute Bonartes (bonartes.org), as well as numerous publications translated into many languages and re-edited until the 1960s. The following list of main works are itemized according to the date of their first edition and their English edition.

== Taxon named in his honor ==
The southeast Asian fish Opsarius bernatziki (Koumans, 1937) was named after him.

== Works ==
- Zwischen weissem Nil und Belgisch–Kongo. L. W. Seidel & Sohn, Vienna 1929.
- Gari–Gari, The Call of the African Wilderness. London: Constable & Co. 1936. New York: H. Holt & Co. 1936 (Vienna: L. W. Seidel & Sohn 1930).
- Albanien. Das Land der Schkipetaren. 204 photos, L. W. Wien: Seidel & Sohn 1930.
- The Dark Continent, Afrika. London: "The Studio" Ltd. 1931. New York: B. Westermann 1931, (Berlin: Atlantis 1930).
- Geheimnisvolle Inseln Tropenafrikas. Das Reich der Bidyogo auf den Bissagos Inseln, Wasmuth, Berlin–Zürich 1933
- Äthiopen des Westens. Portugiesisch Guinea, 2 vols., 378 photos, contribution by Bernhard Struck, L. W. Seidel & Sohn, Wien 1933.
- Südsee. Travels in the South Sea, London: Constable & Co. 1935. New York: H. Holt & Co. 1935 (Leipzig: Bibliographisches Institut 1934).
- Lapland, Overland with the Nomad Lapps, London: Constabel & Co. 1938. New York: R. M. McBride & Co. 1938 (Wien: L. W. Seidel & Sohn 1935).
- Owa Raha, Wien–Leipzig–Olten: Bernina Verlag 1936.
- The Spirits of the Yellow Leaves, with collaboration of Emmy Bernatzik. London: R. Hale 1956. (München: Bertelsmann 1938).
- Akha and Miao, Problems of Applied Ethnography in Farther India, 763 pp., New Haven: Human Relation Area Files 1970. (2 vols., 568 pp., 108 ph., Innsbruck: Wagner'schen Univ.–Buchdruckerei 1947).
- Die Große Völkerkunde. Sitten, Gebräuche und Wesen fremder Völker, chief editor and co–author, with contributions of 12 authors, 3 vols., Leipzig: Bibliographisches Institut 1939.
- Die Neue große Völkerkunde. Völker und Kulturen der Erde in Wort und Bild, chief editor and co–author, with revisions on the 1939 edition and contributions of 13 authors. 3 vols. 1280 ph., 1525 pp., Frankfurt am Main: Herkul 1954.
- Afrika. Handbuch der angewandten Völkerkunde, 2 vols, chief editor and co–author, with contributions of 32 authors from Germany, Austria, France, Italy, Belgium. Innsbruck: Wagner'schen Univ.– Buchdruckerei 1947.

== See also ==
- Mlabri people
- Owaraha
- Heinrich Küper

== Bibliography ==
- Hermann Mückler: Ethnologe, Photograph, Publizist – Ein Österreichischer in Melanesien: Hugo A. Bernatzik. In: Hermann Mückler (Hrsg.): Österreicher im Pazifik. Novara – Mitteilungen der österreichisch–südpazifischen Gesellschaft (OSPG). Bd 2. Vienna 1999, pp. 185–196. ISBN 3-9500765-1-4
- Doris Byer: Der Fall Hugo A.Bernatzik. Ein Leben zwischen Ethnologie und Öffentlichkeit 1897–1953. Böhlau, Köln Weimar 1999. ISBN 3-412-12698-5
- Bernatzik: Afrika. South Pacific. Southeast Asia, 3 vols., photographs by Hugo A. Bernatzik, Essays by Kevin Conru, Klaus–Jochen Krüger, Margarete Loke, Christina Angela Thomas, Alison Nordström, Jacques Ivanoff. imago mundi, 5 Continents Editions, Milan, 2003, ISBN 88-7439-044-0
- Florian Stifel: Who was Hugo A. Bernatzik? (1897–1953). In: Tribal, The Magazine of Tribal Art 38, 2005. pp. 108–111
- Jacques Ivanoff: Introduction and Analysis of the Moken Oral Corpus, in: Moken and Semang, 1936–2004 Persistence and Change, Hugo A. Bernatzik. White Lotus, Bangkok 2005. pp. XV– XLV. ISBN 974-4800-82-8
- Jørgen Rischel: Introduction, linguistic analysis of the Mlabri, in: The Spirits of the Yellow Leaves, Hugo Adolf Bernatzik. White Lotus, Bangkok 2005, pp. XI–XXXVIII, ISBN 974-4800-71-2
- Doris Byer, Christian Reder (eds. and co–authors), Drawing as Universal Language. Graphic Works of Southeast Asia and Melanesia, Hugo A. Bernatzik Collection 1932–1937. Contributions by Manfred Fassler, Jacques Ivanoff, Elisabeth von Samsonow. Springer Wien New York 2011. ISBN 978-3-7091-0799-7
