= Ugi Island =

Island in Solomon Islands

Coordinates: 10°15′18″S 161°44′06″E

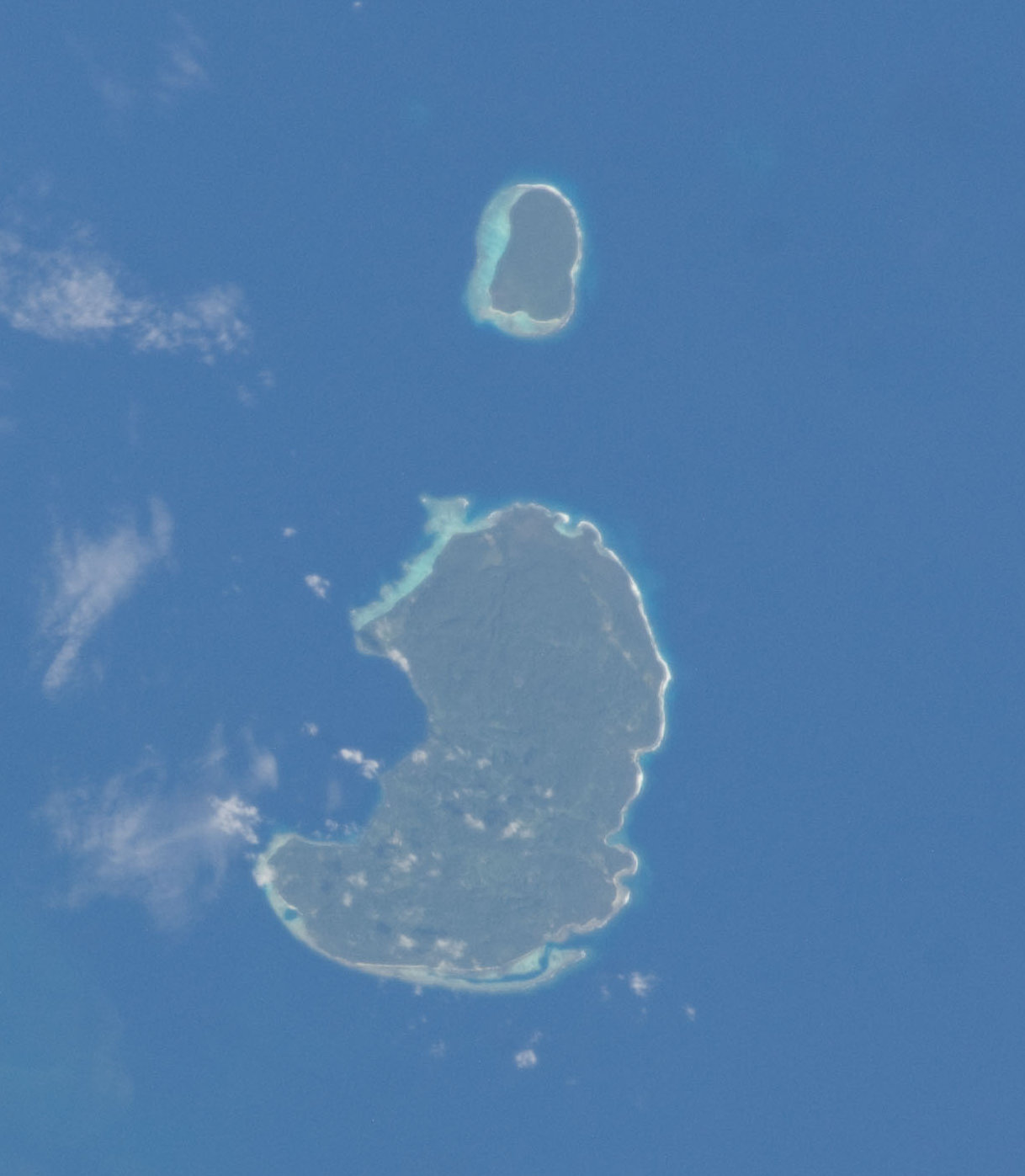
Satellite image of Ugi (larger) and Pio (smaller) islands

Ugi Island, also Uki Island or Uki Ni Massi, is an island 11 km north of the island of Makira, Makira-Ulawa Province in Solomon Islands, Pacific Ocean.

== Geography ==
Ugi Island is a raised coral reef about 10.5 km long and 6.5 km wide. The island has an area of 43.98 km^{2} and the highest elevation is 160 metres (520 feet). The island has a pleasant climate and good beaches.

== Fauna ==
The only mammals that live there were introduced by humans like the Polynesian rat (Rattus exulans) and bats Dobsonia inermis, Pteropus cognatus, Emballonura nigrescens and Aselliscus tricuspidatus.

== Village ==
At the census of population on 23 November 2009, the island had a population of 1,212. Most people live next to Selwyn Bay on the western side of the island. The principal village is Pawa, located at Selwyn Bay on the west coast. Archaeological evidence has demonstrated continuous occupation of the island since 1470 AD. The All Hallows' (senior primary) boys' boarding school was established at Ugi Island on 9 June 1922 by the Diocese of Melanesia as a replacement for St. Barnabas' School on Norfolk Island. What was left of the school was operated as a Diocese of Melanesia primary school until it was handed over to the Solomon government in 1975 to become a provincial secondary school.
