= Makira-Ulawa Province =

- Province
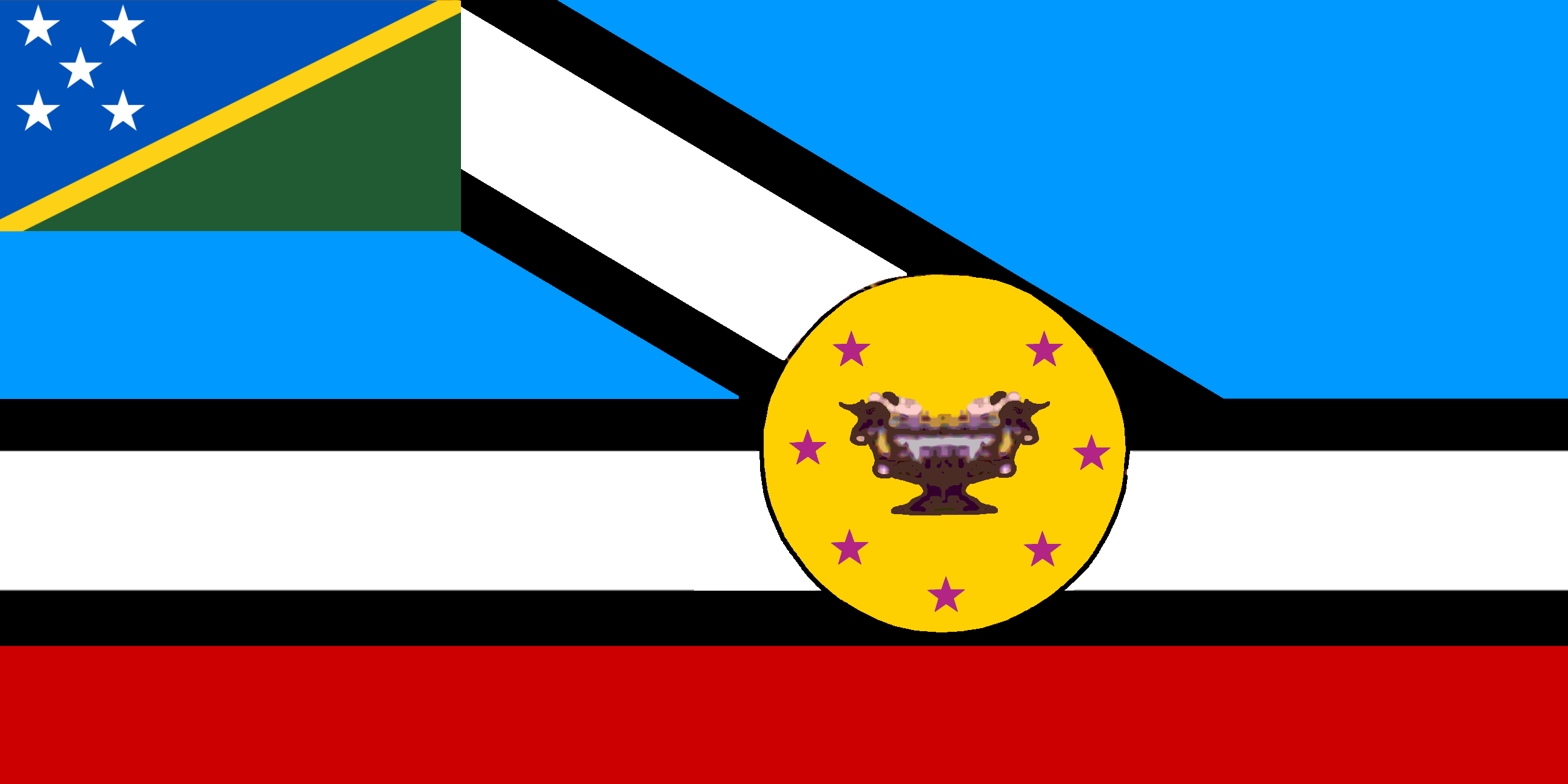
- Flag

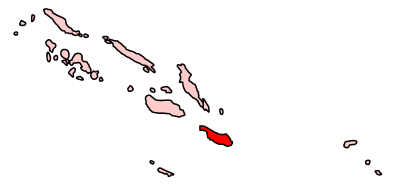
- Coordinates: 10°26′S 161°52′E
- Country: Solomon Islands
- Capital: Kirakira

Government
  - Premier: Hon. Stanley Siapu

Area
  - Total: 3,188 km^{2} (1,231 sq mi)

Population (2019 census)
  - Total: 51,587
  - Density: 16.18/km^{2} (41.91/sq mi)
- Time zone: UTC+11 (+11)
- ISO 3166 code: SB-MK

Makira-Ulawa Province is one of the nine provinces of Solomon Islands. It is mainly made up of the island of the same name, located east of Guadalcanal. The largest city and capital is Kirakira, in the north of Makira. The province is best known for its football club Real Kakamora, which in recent years have become one of the largest clubs in the Oceania Football Confederation.

== Geography ==
The main part of the province is Makira Island. The capital is Kirakira.

Makira-Ulawa Province includes Makira (San Cristobal), Ulawa, Uki Ni Masi, Owaraha (Santa Ana), Owariki (Santa Catalina), Pio, Aio, and others.

Makira Island is 3,190 km^{2} (1,230 sq mi), being nearly 139 km long by 40 km wide near the centre of the island. Mountains run like a spine down the island's centre: the highest point reaches 1040 metres above sea level, then falls steeply to the sea along its southern shore. Many rivers penetrate the island in roughly parallel lines every two to five kilometres. Makira has more inland swamps—and saltwater crocodiles—than any other island in the Solomon Islands. Its coast is the only part of the Solomons where the rare Olive ridley sea turtle (also known as the Pacific ridley sea turtle) is known to visit and nest.

Because Makira Island was isolated for long stretches of time during periods of high sea level, a wide variety of unique plants and animals evolved. For example, 12 of its 70 resident species of birds are endemic, as are two species of trees, both figs (Ficus cristobalensis and Ficus illiberalis). This uniqueness highlights the importance of preserving Makira's forest habitat.

Makira is also among the most important islands in the country for birds. There are some bird watching spots on the island. At the village of Hauta, situated hundreds of metres above sea level, at the Bauro inland region an established conservation area exists. However, one requires a permission to visit, which can be acquired from the Provincial Office at Kirakira.

== Population ==
As of 2019, the total population was estimated to be 51,587. Makira-Ulawa people are mostly Melanesian and their traditional dances and rituals are still strongly kept, especially in the islands of Santa Ana (Owaraha), Santa Catalina (Owariki), Uki-ni-masi and Ulawa.

On Makira, five languages are spoken: Arosi, Bauro, Fagani, Kahua, and Owa. The Bauro speakers have been considered to be the most isolated and conservative of the Makira groups. The people of Ulawa and Ugi Island speak Sa'a.

== Administrative divisions ==
Makira-Ulawa Province is sub-divided into the following constituencies (or electoral districts), which are further sub-divided into wards (with populations at the 2009 and 2019 Censuses respectively):

Name		Population (2009 census)			Population (2019 census)		
Name		Total	Male	Female	Total	Male	Female
44. – West Makira		12,060	6,289	5,771	14,397	7,361	7,036
44.05.	Arosi South	3,009	1,575	1,434	3,169	1,623	1,546
44.06.	Arosi West	2,009	1,064	945	2,425	1,236	1,189
44.07.	Arosi North	2,344	1,207	1,137	2,820	1,428	1,392
44.08.	Arosi East	2,054	1,083	971	2,746	1,403	1,343
44.20.	Haununu	2,644	1,360	1,284	3,237	1,671	1,566
45. – Central Makira		10,115	5,295	4,820	13,196	6,916	6,280
45.09.	Bauro West	3,928	2,066	1,862	5,221	2,706	2,515
45.10.	Bauro Central	4,562	2,384	2,178	5,557	2,919	2,638
45.11.	Bauro East	1,625	845	780	2,418	1,291	1,127
46. – East Makira		13,712	6,939	6,773	18,405	9,513	8,892
46.12.	Wainoni West	2,131	1,074	1,057	3,242	1,660	1,582
46.13.	Wainoni East	2,488	1,263	1,225	3,254	1,731	1,523
46.14.	Star Harbour North	3,262	1,654	1,608	4,106	2,158	1,948
46.15.	Santa Ana	1,547	757	790	1,939	954	985
46.16.	Santa Catalina	811	413	398	1,015	506	509
46.17.	Star Harbour South	1,138	580	558	1,561	811	750
46.18.	Rawo	677	356	321	934	490	444
46.19.	Weather Coast	1,658	842	816	2,354	1,203	1,151
47. – Ulawa/Ugi		4,532	2,266	2,266	5,589	2,872	2,717
47.01.	North Ulawa	1,169	586	583	1,428	712	716
47.02.	South Ulawa	1,294	627	667	1,499	772	727
47.03.	West Ulawa	860	434	426	1,064	539	525
47.04.	Ugi and Pio	1,209	619	590	1,598	849	749
Total		40,419	20,789	19,630	51,587	26,662	24,925

== Islands ==
- Ali'ite
- Makira (San Cristobal)
- Malaulalo
- Malaupaina
- Owaraha (Santa Ana)
- Owariki (Santa Catalina)
- Pio
- Ugi
- Ulawa
