= Olu Malau Islands =

Island group in Solomon Islands

Coordinates: 10°10′S 161°57′E

Olu Malau Islands (a.k.a. Three Sisters Islands) are islands of the Makira-Ulawa Province of the Solomon Islands. The estimated terrain elevation above sea level is 24 metres.

Literally, the name Olu Malau means "Three Islands" (olu "three", malau "island").

The islands, from north to south, are:

1. Ali'ite
2. Malaulalo
3. Malaupaina
