= List of ambassadors of Spain to Serbia =

Ambassador of Spain to Serbia
- Coat of arms of Spain
- Incumbent; Ander Ruiz de Gopegui Aramburu since 29 July 2026
- Ministry of Foreign Affairs; Secretariat of State for the European Union
- Style: The Most Excellent
- Residence: Belgrade
- Nominator: The Foreign Minister
- Appointer: The Monarch
- Term length: At the government's pleasure
- Inaugural holder: Fernando Olivié González-Pumariega
- Formation: 1977
- Website: Mission of Spain to Serbia

The ambassador of Spain to Serbia is the official representative of the Kingdom of Spain to the Republic of Serbia. It is also accredited to Montenegro.

In 1910, Spain sent an envoy to Belgrade. With the rank of resident minister, Manuel Multedo y Cortina represented Spanish interest in Sofia, Bucharest and Belgrade. Once the Kingdom of Yugoslavia was established, Spain recognized it and established permanent relations. Diplomatic relations were severed after the fall of the monarchy and were not reestablished until 1977, when Spain transitioned to democracy and restored diplomatic relations with the socialist republics. That same year, Spain established an embassy-rank diplomatic mission based in Belgrade.

== Jurisdiction ==
- Serbia: The Embassy in Belgrado has existed since the 1910s and its primary jurisdiction has been the governments based in Belgrade, currently the Republic of Serbia. For historic reasons, it also serves as ambassador to Montenegro. The Embassy offers consular protection to both countries, except Kosovo, which is responsibility of the ambassador of Spain to North Macedonia.

The ambassador is also accredited to:

- Montenegro: Spain has kept diplomatic relations with Montenegro since it was part of Yugoslavia, although official relations with independent Montenegro were established on 16 June 2006. Spain has an honorary consulate in Podgorica.

== List of ambassadors ==
This list was compiled using the work "History of the Spanish Diplomacy" by the Spanish historian and diplomat Miguel Ángel Ochoa Brun. The work covers up to the year 2000, so the rest is based on appointments published in the Boletín Oficial del Estado.

Name	Rank	Term
Kingdom of Serbia
Manuel Multedo y Cortina	Minister	1910–1913
Luis Romero de Ibarreta; Marquess of Romero de Tejada	Chargé d'affaires	1913
Manuel Multedo y Cortina	Minister	1913–1918
Kingdom of Yugoslavia
Luis Dupuy de Lôme	Chargé d'affaires	1919
Cristóbal Fernández-Vallín y Alfonso	Minister	1919–1921
José Gil Delgado y Olazábal	Minister	1921–1924
Francisco Serrat y Bonastre	Minister	1924–1925
José de Landecho y Allendesalazar	Minister	1925–1926
Fernando Alcalá-Galiano y Smith; Count of Torrijos	Minister	1926–1936
Carlos Montilla Escudero (Note: Representig the Republican Government.)	Chargé d'affaires	1936–1938
Francisco Barnés Salinas	Minister	1937–1939
José Marín	Chargé d'affaires	1938
Eduardo García Comín	Minister	1939–1941
Diplomatic relations interrupted (1941–1977)
Socialist Federal Republic of Yugoslavia
Germán de Caso Ridaura	Head of Consular and Trade Mission	1972–1977
Fernando Olivié González-Pumariega	Ambassador	1977–1981
Jesús Millaruelo Cleméntez	Ambassador	1981–1984
Julián Ayesta	Ambassador	1984–1986
Luis Cuervo Fábregas	Ambassador	1986–1990
José Manuel Allendesalazar Valdés	Ambassador	1990–1992
Serbia and Montenegro
Francisco Pascual de la Parte	Chargé d'affaires	1992–1994
José Antonio Bardallo Huidobro	Chargé d'affaires	1994–1996
Joaquín Pérez Gómez	Ambassador	1996–2000
Mariano García Muñoz	Ambassador	2000–2005
Serbia
José Riera Siquier (Note: Accredited to Montenegro.)	Ambassador	2005–2008
Íñigo de Palacio España	Ambassador	2008–2011
Arturo Laclaustra	Ambassador	2011–2014
Miguel Fuertes	Ambassador	2015–2019
Raúl Bartolomé Molina	Ambassador	2019–2023
Juan José Sanz Aparicio	Ambassador	2023–2026
Ander Ruiz de Gopegui Aramburu	Ambassador	2026–pres.

== See also ==
- Serbia–Spain relations
- Spain–Yugoslavia relations
