= List of ambassadors of Spain to Greece =

Ambassador of Spain to Greece
- Coat of arms of Spain

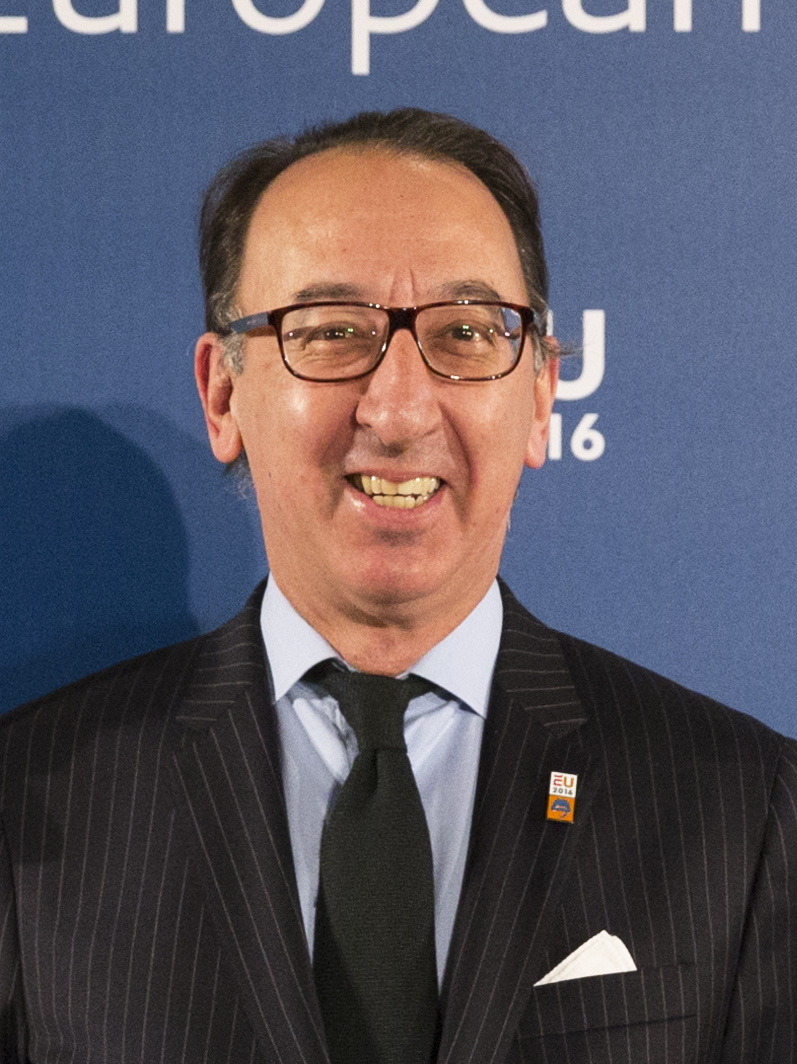
- Incumbent; Jorge Domecq since 16 October 2024
- Ministry of Foreign Affairs; Secretariat of State for the European Union
- Style: The Most Excellent
- Residence: Athens
- Nominator: The Foreign Minister
- Appointer: The Monarch
- Term length: At the government's pleasure
- Inaugural holder: Sebastián de Romero Radigales
- Formation: 1953
- Website: Mission of Spain to Greece

The ambassador of Spain to Greece is the official representative of the Kingdom of Spain to the Hellenic Republic.

The first contacts between Spain and the Kingdom of Greece took place at the end of 1832, when Prince Soutzos, Greek ambassador in Paris, informed King Ferdinand VII of the appointment of Prince Otto as King of Greece. Spain recognized the new Greek state on 1834 and established a Legation in Athens that same year.

Relations remained cordial and normal until the 1860s. In this decade, the expulsion of Otto of Greece and the deposition of Isabella II in Spain caused a standstill in diplomatic relations, and, despite a small attempt in 1869, they were not resumed until the 1880s. From 1892 to 1914, diplomatic relations were channeled through the Spanish Legation in Constantinople, and in 1953, both governments elevated their legations to the rank of embassy.

== List of ambassadors ==
This list was compiled using the work "History of the Spanish Diplomacy" by the Spanish historian and diplomat Miguel Ángel Ochoa Brun. The work covers up to the year 2000, so the rest is based on appointments published in the Boletín Oficial del Estado.

Name	Rank	Term
Mariano Montalvo y Ovando	Chargé d'affaires	1834–1841
Juan de la Concha	Chargé d'affaires	1841
Manuel Sáenz de Viniegra	Chargé d'affaires	1842
Luis de Flores Fondevila	Chargé d'affaires	1843–1844
José García de Villalta	Chargé d'affaires	1844–1846†
José Pizarro y Ramirez, Count of Navas	Chargé d'affaires	1846–1847
Fernando de la Vera Isla-Fernández	Chargé d'affaires	1847–1848
Fernando Souza de Portugal	Chargé d'affaires	1861–1862
Fernando Souza de Portugal	Chargé d'affaires	1866
Salvador López Guijarro	Minister	1869
Adolfo Patxot y Achaval	Minister	1882–1885
Rafael Antonio Lasheras, Count of Sanafé	Minister	1884
Ángel Ruata Sichar	Minister	1885–1886
Joaquín Valera Aceituno	Minister	1886–1888
Emilio Ojeda Perpiñán	Minister	1888–1889
Juan Antonio López de Cevallos	Minister	1889–1890
Pedro Prat y Agacino, Marquess of Prat de Nantouillet Pedro de Prat y Agacino	Minister	1890–1892
The Minister to the Ottoman Empire		1892–1914
Manuel Pérez-Seoane y Roca de Togores, Count of Velle	Minister	1915–1917
Andrés López de Vega y Muñoz	Minister	1917–1921
Cristóbal Fernández-Vallín y Alfonso	Minister	1921–1926
Alfredo Mariátegui Carratalá	Minister	1926–1929
Antonio Benítez y Fernández	Minister	1929–1930
Diego del Alcázar y Roca de Togores, Count of Villamediana	Minister	1930–1931
Alonso Caro y del Arroyo	Minister	1931–1933
Pedro Manuel Abella y Fernández-Ferreros	Minister	1933–1936
Máximo José Kahn	Chargé d'affaires (Note: Representative of the Republican government during the Spanish Civil War.)	1938–1939
Sebastián de Romero Radigales	Diplomatic agent (Note: Representative of the Rebel government during the Spanish Civil War.)	1939
Julio Palencia Tubau	Minister	1939–1940
José María Doussinague	Minister	1940–1941
Eduardo Gasset y Díez de Ulzurrun	Chargé d'affaires	1941–1943
Antonio Gullón y Gómez	Diplomatic agent	1943
Sebastián de Romero Radigales	Minister	1943–1954
Sebastián de Romero Radigales	Ambassador	1953–1954
Luis Martínez de Irujo y Caro, Marquess of Los Arcos	Ambassador	1954–1956
Juan Felipe de Ranero Rodríguez	Ambassador	1956–1961
Juan Ignacio Luca de Tena y García-Torres, Marquess of Luca de Tena	Ambassador	1961–1962
Federico Díez y de Isasi	Ambassador	1963–1967
José Manuel Aniel-Quiroga y Redondo	Ambassador	1967–1973
Fernando Rodríguez-Porrero y de Chávarri	Ambassador	1973–1976
Antonio Poch Gutiérrez de Caviedes	Ambassador	1976–1978
Gabriel Mañueco de Lecea	Ambassador	1978–1981
Pedro López de Aguirrebengoa	Ambassador	1982–1986
Enrique Mahou Stauffer	Ambassador	1986–1993
José Cuenca Anaya	Ambassador	1993–1996
Javier Jiménez-Ugarte Hernández	Ambassador	1996–2001
Eduardo Junco Bonet	Ambassador	2001–2004
Juan Ramón Martínez Salazar	Ambassador	2004–2008
Miguel Fuertes	Ambassador	2008–2012
Alfonso Lucini	Ambassador	2012–2017
Enrique Viguera Rubio	Ambassador	2017–2021
Carles Casajuana	Ambassador	2021–2024
Jorge Domecq	Ambassador	2024–pres.

== See also ==
- Spain–Greece relations
