= Jorge Domecq =

Spanish diplomat

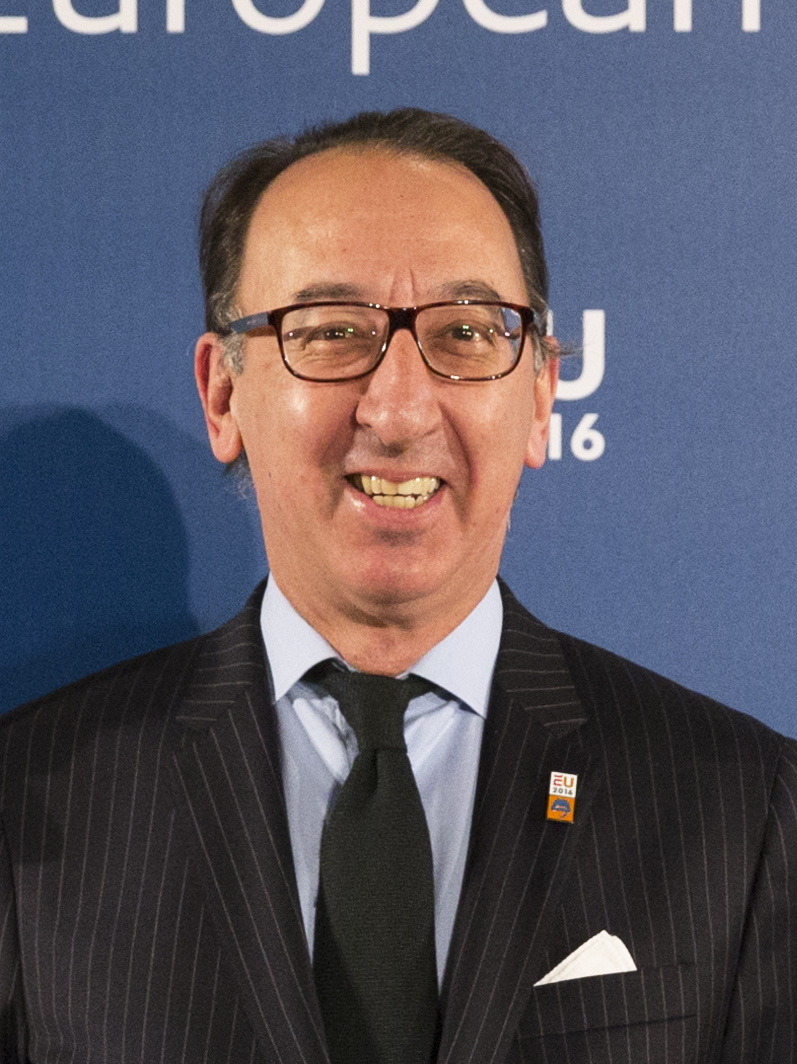
- Domecq in 2016

Chief Executive of European Defence Agency
- Incumbent
- Assumed office February 2015
- Preceded by: Claude-France Arnould

Ambassador Permanent Representative of Spain to OSCE
- In office 22 March 2014 – 24 January 2015
- Preceded by: Fernando Valderrama Pareja
- Succeeded by: María Victoria González Román

Ambassador of Spain to the Philippines
- In office 2011–2014
- Monarch: Juan Carlos I of Spain
- Prime Minister: Mariano Rajoy
- Succeeded by: Luis Calvo

Minister Counsellor at the Spanish Embassy in Morocco
- In office 2004–2005
- Prime Minister: José Luis Rodríguez Zapatero

Personal details
- Born: Jorge Manuel Domecq Fernandez de Bobadilla; 28 November 1960 (age 65) Jerez de la Frontera, Spain
- Profession: Diplomat and Public Servant

Jorge Domecq (born 28 November 1960) is a Spanish diplomat who serves as Ambassador of Spain to Greece since 2024. Previously, he served as ambassador of Spain to the Philippines (2011–2014). From February 2015 to January 2020, he was Chief Executive of the European Defence Agency, appointed by Federica Mogherini.

Bachelor of Law, entered 1985 in the Diplomatic Corps. He has served in the Spanish Embassy in the NATO Council and Brazil. He was adviser Executive Cabinet Minister of Defence, Chief of Cabinet of the Secretary General of NATO and second in command at the Embassy of Spain in Italy. In 2004 he was appointed second in command at the Embassy of Spain in Morocco and in 2005 he held the post of deputy director general of the Bureau of Gibraltar. Later, he was director general of the UN, Global Affairs and Human Rights at the Ministry of Foreign Affairs, and from July 2010 to January 2011 he was director general of Multilateral Affairs.

== Honours ==
- Spanish Cross of Naval Merit (first class)
- Commander and Officer of the Spanish Orders of the Civil Merit and of the Order of Queen Isabel la Católica
- Grand-Officer of the Order of Al-Wissam (Morocco)
- Grand-Officer of the Order of La Stella (Italy)
- Third Degree Knight Commander of Rizal, Order of the Knights of Rizal
- Grand Cross, Order of Sikatuna, gold distinction. Republic of the Philippines
