= Bosnia and Herzegovina–Spain relations =

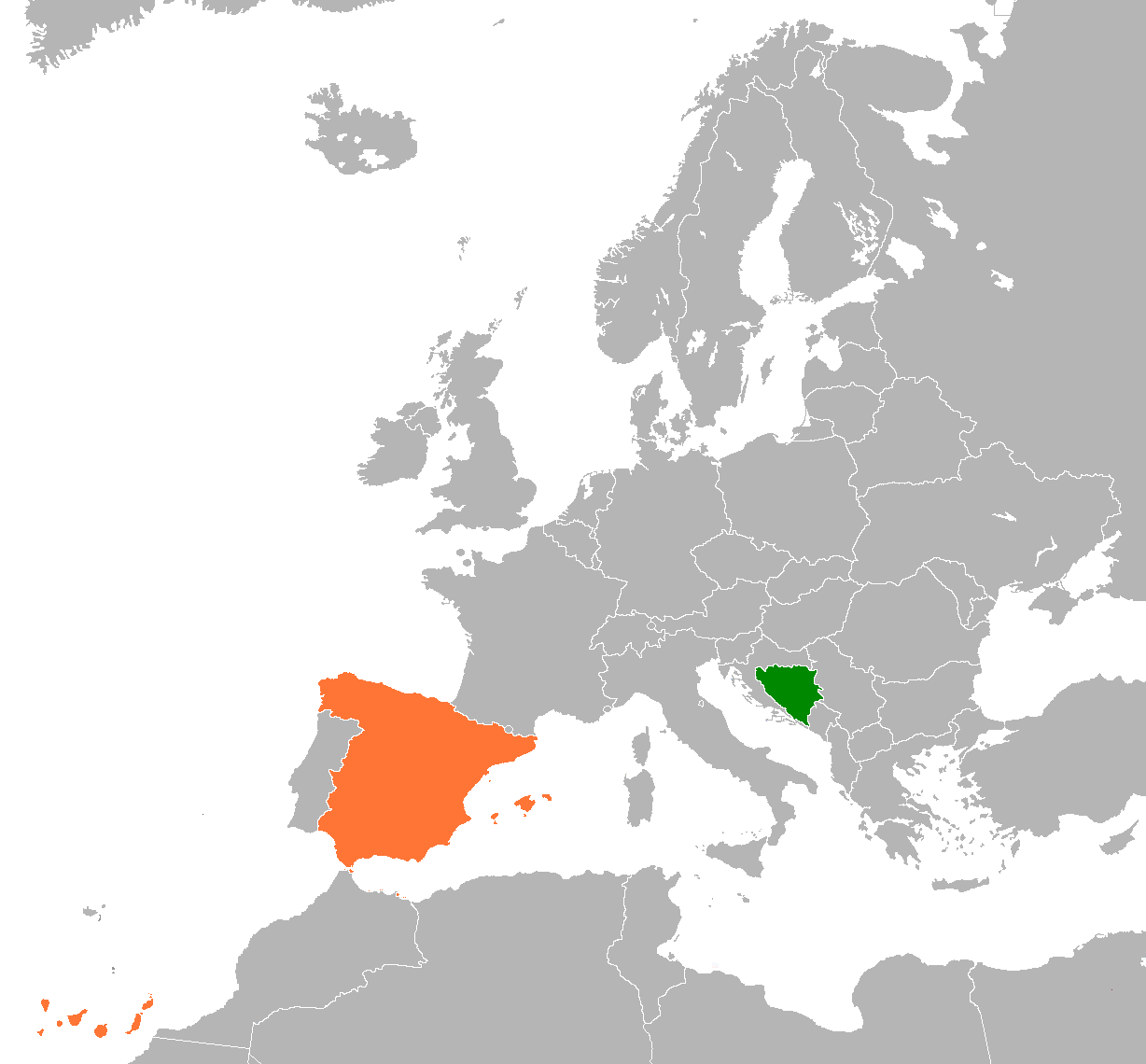

- Bosnia and Herzegovina: Spain

Bosnia and Herzegovina–Spain relations were formally established on 14 December 1992.

Historical ties date back to the introduction of the Spanish language to Bosnia by Spanish-speaking Jews fleeing Spain after the enactment of the Alhambra Decree in 1492. During the Bosnian War of 1992 to 1995, Spain sent troops to support the United Nations peacekeeping effort in Bosnia. Bosnia and Herzegovina is a EU candidate and Spain is a EU member state.

== History ==
=== Spanish language ===
Spanish language was first introduced to Bosnia and Herzegovina when it was settled by the Spanish-speaking Sephardic Jews, who had fled the Crown of Castile and the Crown of Aragon following the enactment of the Alhambra Decree by Isabella I of Castile and Ferdinand II of Aragon in 1492. According to the 1921 census, Judaeo-Spanish language was the mother tongue to about 10,000 out of c. 70,000 inhabitants of Sarajevo.

The Holocaust in the Independent State of Croatia (a puppet state that included all of Bosnia and Herzegovina) in the 1940s and the Bosnian War in the 1990s severely depleted Bosnia and Herzegovina's Jewish population; very few of the remaining Jews speak Judaeo-Spanish as their first language. The only university in Bosnia and Herzegovina offering courses of the Spanish language is the University of Sarajevo.

=== Formal relations ===
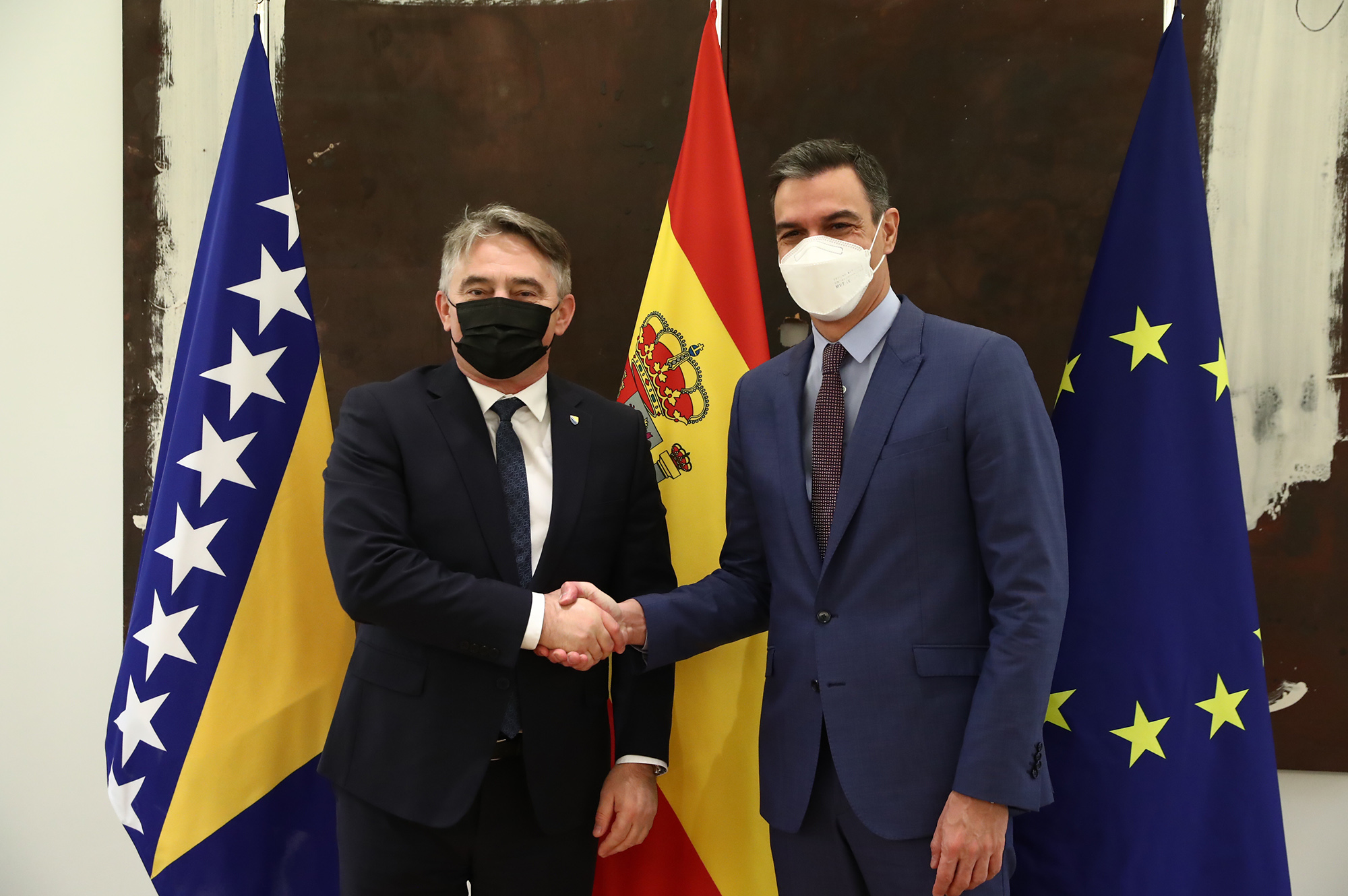
Meeting between Željko Komšić and Spanish prime minister Pedro Sánchez in Moncloa (February 2022).

Formal diplomatic relations between both countries were established on 14 December 1992.

Spain allied with Bosnia and Herzegovina during the Bosnian War (1992–1995). Following the passage of Resolution 770 by the United Nations Security Council in 1993, which guaranteed delivery of humanitarian aid by UN troops even under force, Spain, along with France, Italy, and Belgium, sent troops to aid the effort. Spain also joined France, Great Britain, and the United States in signing a May 22, 1993, "joint strategy" agreement to guard "safe areas" against Serbian invasion.

From 1992 on, Spain sent over 46,000 troops to Bosnia and Herzegovina as part of UN, NATO and UE missions. As of 2022, Spain military deployment in Bosnia and Herzegovina takes place under the purview of the EUFOR-Althea operation.

== Resident diplomatic missions ==
While Spain maintains two diplomatic missions in Bosnia and Herzegovina, the latter maintains only one mission in Spain. The Embassy of Bosnia and Herzegovina is located in Madrid.

The Embassy of Spain in Sarajevo, the capital of Bosnia and Herzegovina, was opened in 1999. The economic and trade relations are rather limited, due to the lack of Spanish entrepreneurs and the still on-going process of standardization in the latter country, as well as due to the issues posed by the bureaucracy and corruption in Bosnia and Herzegovina. One of the goals set by the embassy is the promotion of Spanish culture by conducting concerts, exhibitions and academic events. Spain also maintains a consulate in Mostar.

Additionally, the city of Barcelona signed an agreement of friendship and cooperation with Sarajevo in 1994, and opened the Local Democracy Embassy, staffed by Barcelona's representative, in Sarajevo in 1996.

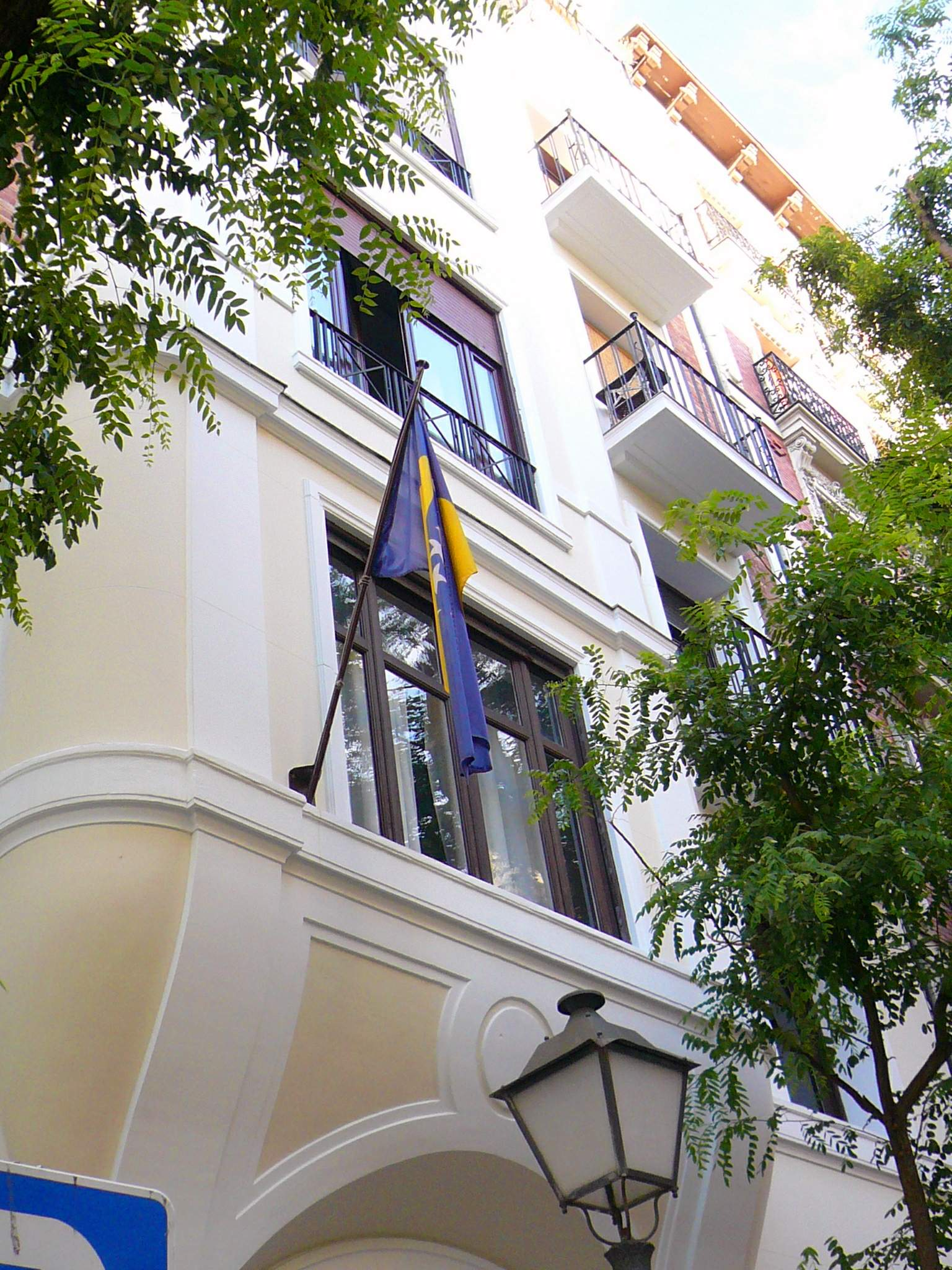
Embassy of Bosnia and Herzegovina in Madrid

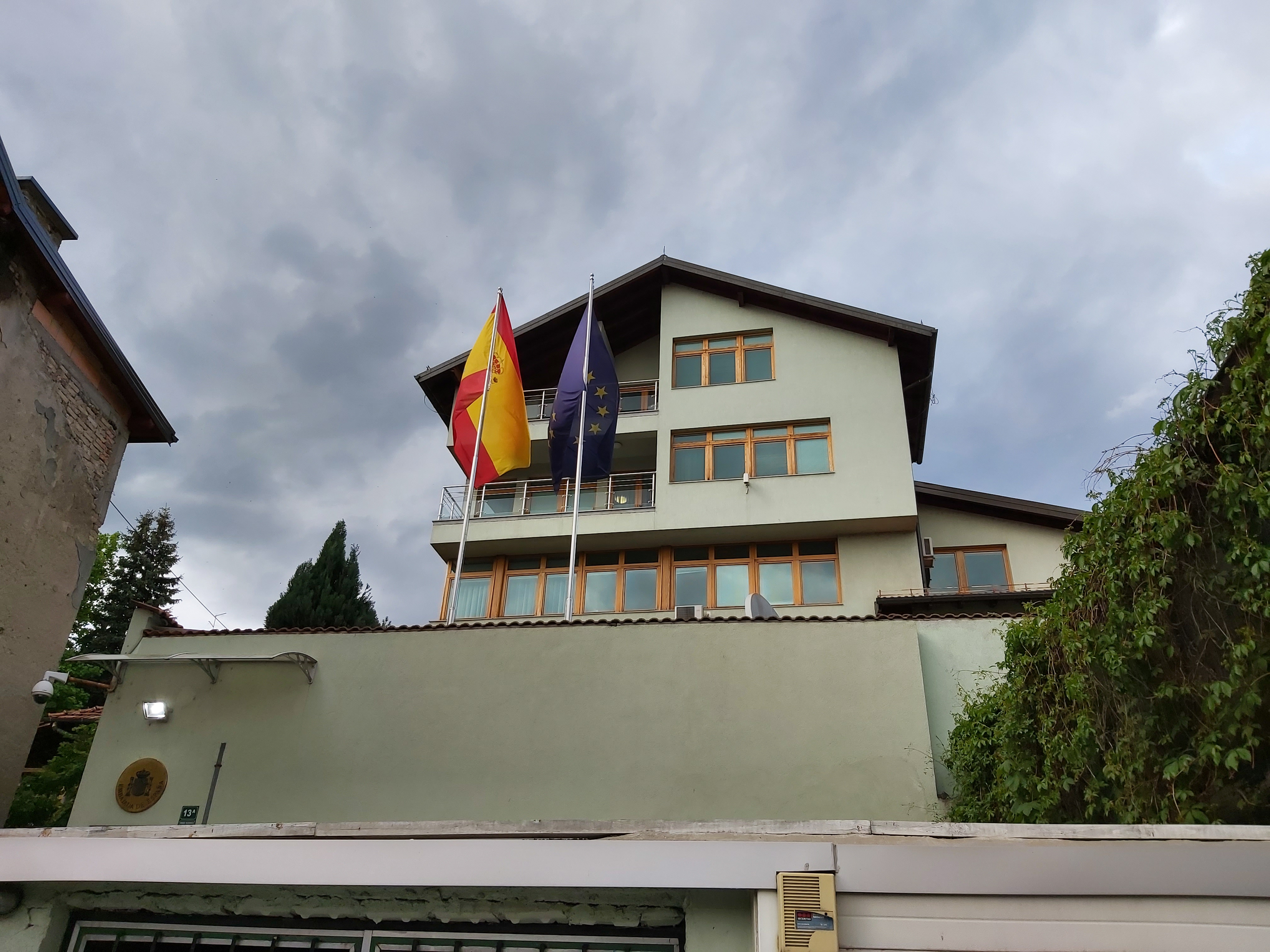
Embassy of Spain in Sarajevo

== See also ==
- Foreign relations of Bosnia and Herzegovina
- Foreign relations of Spain
- Bosnia-NATO relations
- Accession of Bosnia and Herzegovina to the EU
- Spain–Yugoslavia relations
