= Serbs in Spain =

Serbios en España Срби у Шпанији Srbi u Španiji

Total population
- 3,943 (2022)

Regions with significant populations
- Barcelona, Madrid, Alicante, Málaga

Languages
- Spanish and Serbian

Religion
- Eastern Orthodoxy (Serbian Orthodox Church)

Serbs in Spain are Spanish citizens of ethnic Serb descent and/or Serbia-born persons living in Spain. According to data from 2022, there were 3,943 Serbian citizens in Spain.

== Notable people ==
- Stefan Bajcetic – football player
- Bojan Krkić – football player
- Nikola Mirotić – basketball player
- Prince Peter of Yugoslavia – graphic designer and member of the House of Karađorđević

== See also ==
- Immigration to Spain
- Serb diaspora
- Serbia–Spain relations
- Serbian Orthodox Eparchy of Western Europe
