= Eloína Suárez =

Spanish politician (1922–2024)

Eloína Suárez Suárez (November 1922 – 2 May 2024) was a Spanish politician. She was the mayor of Oviedo from 1978 to 1979, and as of her death, was the only woman to hold the office. She was the first woman to be mayor of a provincial capital in Spain.

== Biography ==
Suárez was born in Oviedo, Asturias, to parents who owned a grocery. Her mother was also a teacher in Mieres and taught miners to read.

Suárez married Alfonso Fuertes, a law professor, with whom she had six children. After his death at age 37 in 1959, she took over her parents' business. After seeing similar shops in France, she made the family shop into the first self-service one in Oviedo. She studied business management by night. The business was shut down when its building was demolished.

On 7 February 1971, Suárez took a seat on Oviedo city council, as the only woman in the administration. Mayor Félix Serrano González-Solares stood down due to illness and was succeeded by his first deputy, Higinio Rodríguez Pérez, who resigned. Suárez then succeeded him in June 1978, serving until Luis Riera Posada was elected in the first democratic elections in April 1979. In Asturias, these elections did not result in a single female mayor, the first being María del Mar Suárez in Ribera de Arriba upon her predecessor's resignation in 1981.

Suárez died in Oviedo on 2 May 2024, at the age of 101. At the time of her death, she had five living children, ten grandchildren and seventeen great-grandchildren. Her son Miguel Fuertes Suárez (born 1951) was Spain's ambassador in Greece and Serbia. Her 102-year-old sister also attended her funeral.
