= Slovenia–Spain relations =

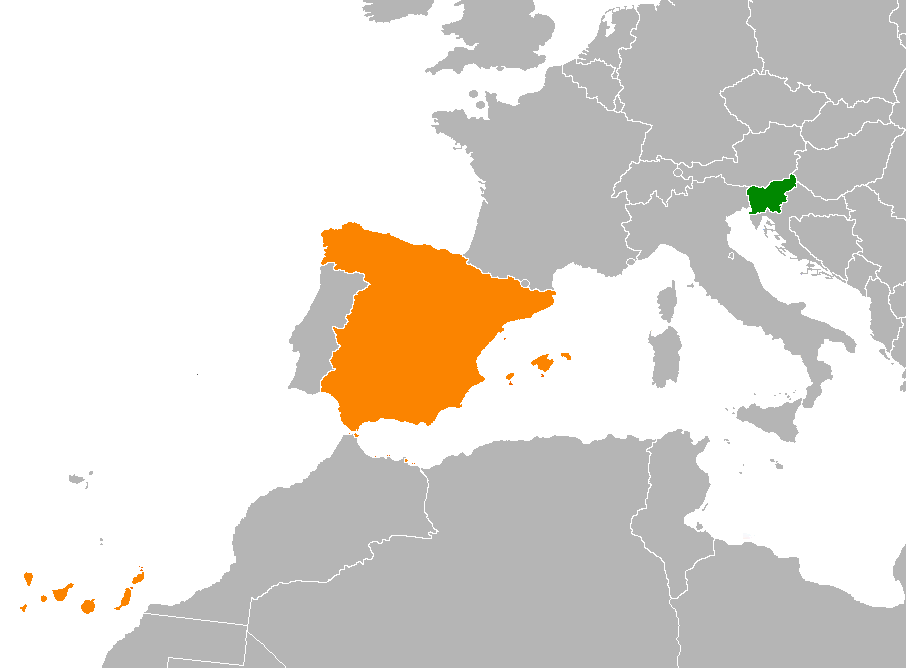

- Slovenia: Spain

Slovenia–Spain relations are the bilateral relations between Slovenia and Spain. Slovenia has an embassy in Madrid and three consulates in Barcelona, San Sebastián and Seville. Spain has an embassy in Ljubljana. The Spanish representation in Slovenia is exercised through the Embassy, which has the support of two Aggregators: Defense and Interior; two departments: Tourism and Economy and Commerce, all of them with residence in surrounding countries, although the Economic and Commercial Office has an Antenna in Ljubljana. There is a Cervantes Classroom under the Instituto Cervantes of Vienna. The relations of these two countries are mainly defined by their membership in both the European Union and the NATO.

== Diplomatic relations ==
Since the meeting in Madrid of the Secretary of State for the EU, Íñigo Méndez de Vigo, with his Slovenian counterpart, Igor Senčar, in October 2012, the bilateral consultations have been institutionalized semiannual at DG level.

== Economic relations ==
In 2014, Spanish exports to Slovenia amounted to 558 million euros (data reviewed in December 2015). The country represents the 54th customer of Spain.

In the period January–October 2015, Spanish exports to Slovenia have reached a value of €394 million, which represents a 4% drop compared to the same period of 2014.

The relationship with cars, the leading sector of Spanish exports to Slovenia, reaches €131 million, a third of the total, and remains at a similar value compared to the previous year.

== Cooperation ==
In November 2015, Spain sent various humanitarian material to Slovenia to accommodate the large number of refugees arriving in its territory.

== High level visits ==
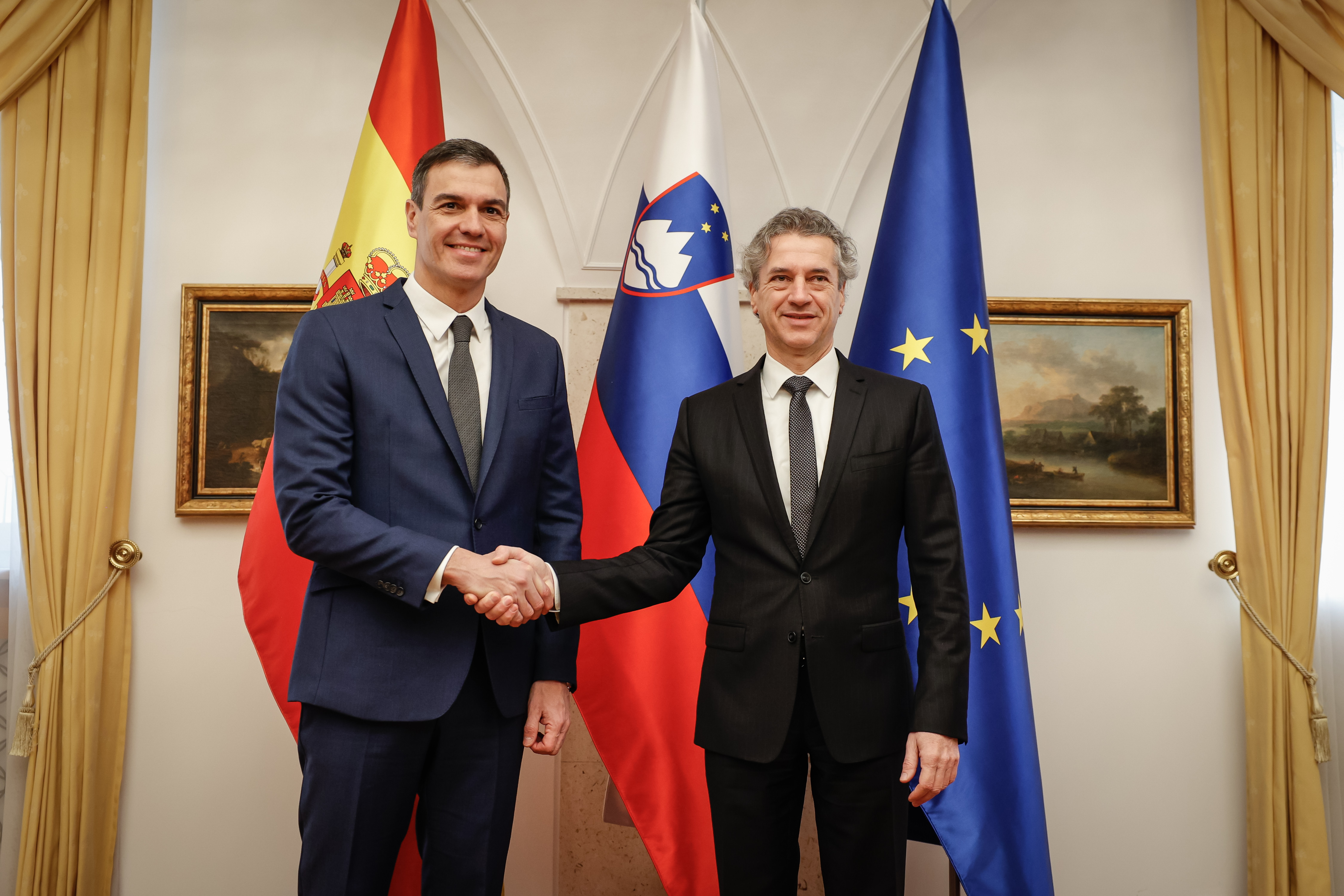
Spanish Prime Minister Pedro Sánchez meeting with Slovenian Prime Minister Robert Golob in Ljubljana, 17 February 2023

In January 2023, Spanish Foreign Minister José Manuel Albares travelled to Slovenia to meet his Slovenian counterpart, Tanja Fajon. During this visit, Minister Albares was received by the President of Slovenia, Nataša Pirc Musar, and met with the Prime Minister, Robert Golob, and with the Speaker of the National Assembly, Urška Klakočar Zupančič.

In February 2023, Prime Minister of Slovenia, Robert Golob hosted the Prime Minister of Spain, Pedro Sánchez.

In April 2024, Prime Minister Sánchez visited Prime Minister Golob again. Both leaders announced their commitment to recognising the "Palestinian state when the circumstances are right to do so and in a way that can have the most positive impact on the peace process."

== Resident diplomatic missions ==
- Slovenia has an embassy in Madrid.
- Spain has an embassy in Ljubljana.
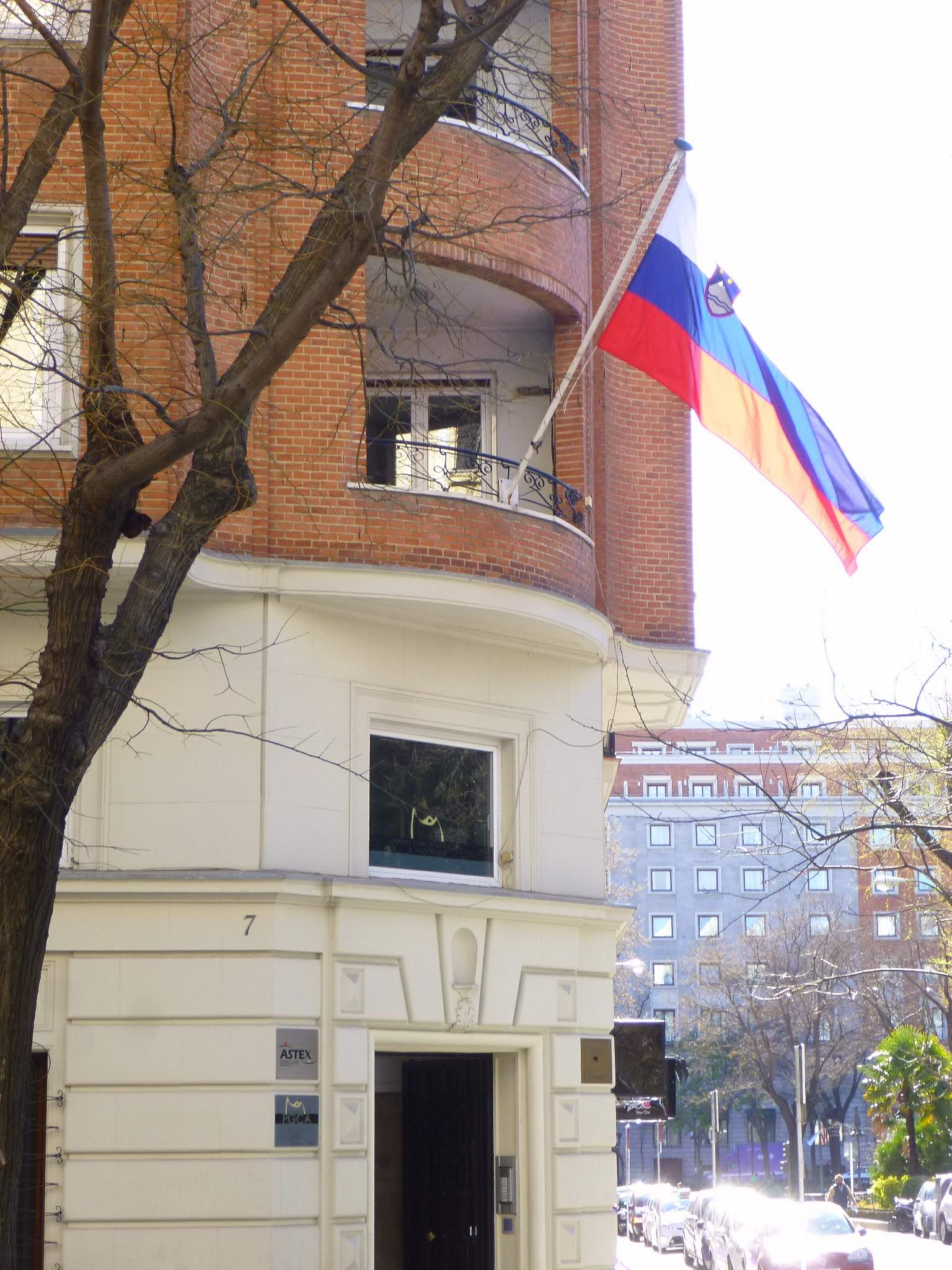
Embassy of Slovenia in Madrid

== See also ==
- Foreign relations of Slovenia
- Foreign relations of Spain
- NATO-EU relations
- Spain–Yugoslavia relations
