= Miguel Fuertes =

Spanish diplomat (born 1951)

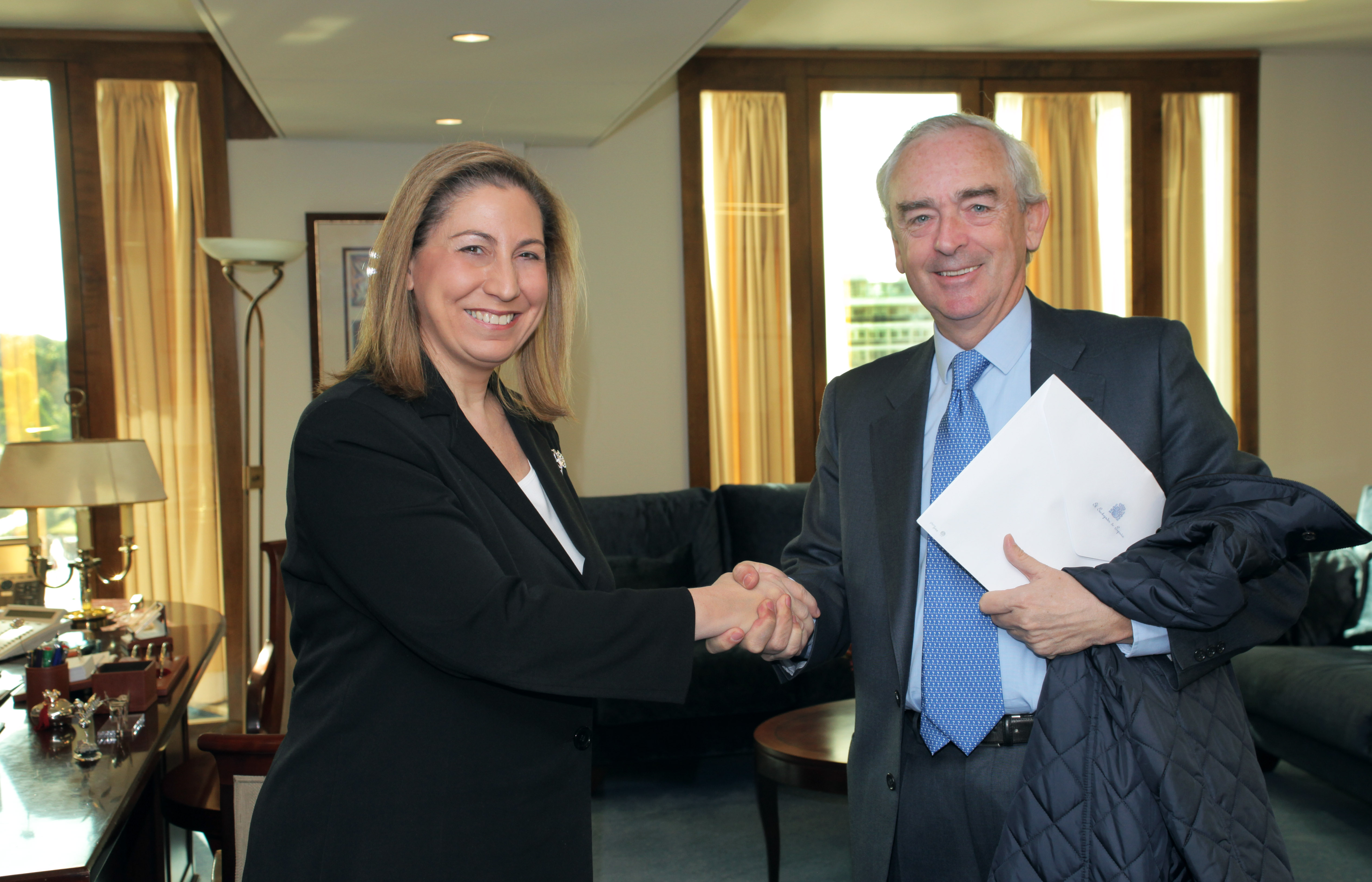
Fuertes in 2011, with Greek foreign minister Mariliza Xenogiannakopoulou

Miguel Fuertes Suárez (born 2 November 1951) is a Spanish diplomat. He was the ambassador to Greece (2008–2012) and to Serbia (2015–2019).

== Biography ==
Fuertes was born in Oviedo, Asturias. His mother Eloína Suárez (1922–2024) was the city's first female mayor in 1978, while his father Alfonso Fuertes (died 1959) was a professor of law.

After graduating in law, Fuertes entered the diplomatic profession in 1978. He was named the ambassador to Greece in 2008. In July 2011, when Greece blocked a Spanish non-governmental organisation's flotilla of aid to the Gaza Strip, members of the group Rumbo a Gaza criticised Fuertes's alleged indifference to the situation and organised an occupation of the embassy in Athens.

From 2012, Fuertes was the consul general in Naples, Italy. In March 2015, he was named ambassador to Serbia. He shared the official Spanish position of non-recognition of the declaration of independence of Kosovo. Fuertes supported the accession of Serbia to the European Union.
