= List of permanent representatives of Spain to OSCE =

Senior diplomat

Ambassador Permanent Representative of Spain to OSCE
- Coat of arms of Spain
- Incumbent; Cristóbal Ramón Valdés y Valentín-Gamazo since 25 August 2021
- Ministry of Foreign Affairs; Secretariat of State for Foreign Affairs
- Style: The Most Excellent
- Member of: OSCE' Permanent Council
- Residence: Vienna
- Nominator: The Foreign Minister
- Appointer: The Monarch
- Inaugural holder: Antonio Cosano Pérez
- Formation: 1995
- Deputy: Deputy Permanent Representative
- Website: Spanish Mission to NATO

The ambassador permanent representative of Spain to OSCE is the official representative of the Kingdom of Spain to the Organization for Security and Co-operation in Europe (OSCE). It also represents Spain before the Joint Consultative Group and the Open Skies Consultative Commission.

The position was formally established in September 1995, after the Conference on Security and Co-operation in Europe (CSCE) was transformed into an international organization.

== Permanent Representation ==
As of 2025, the Permanent Representation is composed by:

- The Permanent Representative, with the rank of Ambassador Extraordinary and Plenipotentiary.
- The Deputy Permanent Representative.
- The Deputy Permanent Representative for Political-Military Affairs.
- Three Counsellors for Defence and Security affairs.
- Two Security Attachés.
- A Chancellor, for administrative support.

== List of ambassadors to the Security Conferences ==
From 1973 to 1995, Spain appointed several persons to lead the Spanish Delegation of the Conferences on Security and Co-operation in Europe. With the exception of Nuño Aguirre de Cárcer, who represented Spain as director-general for Europe of the Ministry of Foreign Affairs, the rest were appointed with the title of "Ambassador Head of Delegation".

- Nuño Aguirre de Cárcer y López de Sagredo (1973–1976). Head of Delegation.
- Juan Luis Pan de Soraluce y Olmos, Count of San Román (1976–1978).
- Francisco Javier Rupérez Rubio (1980–1982).
- Máximo Cajal López (1983–1985).
- José Manuel Allendesalazar Valdés (1985–1986).
- Javier Villacieros Machimbarrena, Count of Villacieros (1986–1989).
- José Antonio San Gil Augustín (1989–1993).
- Leopoldo Stampa Piñeiro (1993–1994).
- Antonio Cosano Pérez (1994–1995).

== List of ambassadors to OSCE ==
Ambassador		Term	Nominated by	Appointed by	Accredited to
1	Antonio Cosano Pérez	3 October 1995 – 2 December 2000 (5 years, 60 days)	Javier Solana	Juan Carlos I	Giancarlo Aragona
2	Joaquín Pérez Gómez	2 December 2000 – 6 December 2003 (3 years, 4 days)	Josep Piqué	Juan Carlos I	Ján Kubiš
3	Carlos Sánchez de Boado	6 December 2003 – 24 May 2008 (4 years, 170 days)	Ana Palacio	Juan Carlos I	Ján Kubiš
4	Marta Betanzos Roig	24 May 2008 – 4 June 2011 (3 years, 11 days)	Miguel Ángel Moratinos	Juan Carlos I	Marc Perrin de Brichambaut
5	Fernando Valderrama Pareja	4 June 2011 – 22 March 2014 (2 years, 291 days)	Trinidad Jiménez	Juan Carlos I	Lamberto Zannier
6	Jorge Domecq	22 March 2014 – 24 January 2015 (308 days)	José Manuel García-Margallo	Juan Carlos I	Lamberto Zannier
7	María Victoria González Román	24 January 2015 – 2 March 2019 (4 years, 37 days)	José Manuel García-Margallo	Felipe VI	Lamberto Zannier
8	Luis Manuel Cuesta Civís	2 March 2019 – 25 August 2021 (2 years, 176 days)	Josep Borrell	Felipe VI	Thomas Greminger
9	Cristóbal Ramón Valdés y Valentín-Gamazo	25 August 2021 – present (5 years, 13 days)	José Manuel Albares	Felipe VI	Helga Schmid
