= Fernando Olivié González-Pumariega =

Spanish diplomat (1925–2021)

Ambassador of Spain to Paraguay
- In office 20 March 1970 – 12 April 1973

Ambassador of Spain to Colombia
- In office 13 April 1973 – 15 April 1977

Ambassador of Spain to Yugoslavia
- In office 16 April 1977 – 8 May 1981
- Preceded by: position established
- Succeeded by: Jesús Millaruelo Cleméntez

Ambassador of Spain to Belgium
- In office 24 September 1982 – 7 November 1985
- Preceded by: Nuño Aguirre de Cárcer
- Succeeded by: Mariano Berdejo Rivera

Ambassador of Spain to Poland
- In office 24 October 1986 – 2 November 1990
- Preceded by: Francisco Javier Villacieros y Machimbarrena
- Succeeded by: José Antonio López Zatón

Personal details
- Born: 1925 Madrid, Kingdom of Spain
- Died: 1 March 2021 (aged 95–96) Pozuelo de Alarcón, Spain

Fernando Olivié González-Pumariega (1925 – 1 March 2021) was a Spanish diplomat. He served as Spanish ambassador to Paraguay, Colombia, Yugoslavia, Belgium, and Poland.

== Biography ==
Olivié began studying at the Diplomatic School of Spain in 1948, which took him to the Spanish Consulate in Montreal. He later served as Secretary to the Spanish Embassy in Ottawa. In 1954, he began working at the Spanish Ministry of Foreign Affairs, where he held various positions, such as Director of Political Affairs for the Philippines and the Far East, Director of Political Affairs of Western Europe, and Director General of Europe, where he actively participated in discussions on Gibraltar under Minister of Foreign Affairs Fernando María Castiella. In 1970, he was appointed Ambassador of Spain to Paraguay. He then became Ambassador to Colombia, Yugoslavia, Belgium, and Poland. He then retired in 1990. He also became President of the Centro Superior de Estudios de la Defensa Nacional in 1977.

Fernando Olivié González-Pumariega died in Pozuelo de Alarcón on 1 March 2021 at the age of 96.

== Distinctions ==
- Grand Cross of the Order of Civil Merit
- Grand Cross of Naval Merit
- Grand Cross of Military Merit
- Grand Cross of Aeronautical Merit
- Commendation of the Order of Isabella the Catholic
- Commendation of the Order of Charles III
- Commander of the Ordre national du Mérite
- Commander of the Order of Merit of the Italian Republic
- Commander of the Order of Merit of the Federal Republic of Germany
- Legion of Honour
