= North Macedonia–Spain relations =

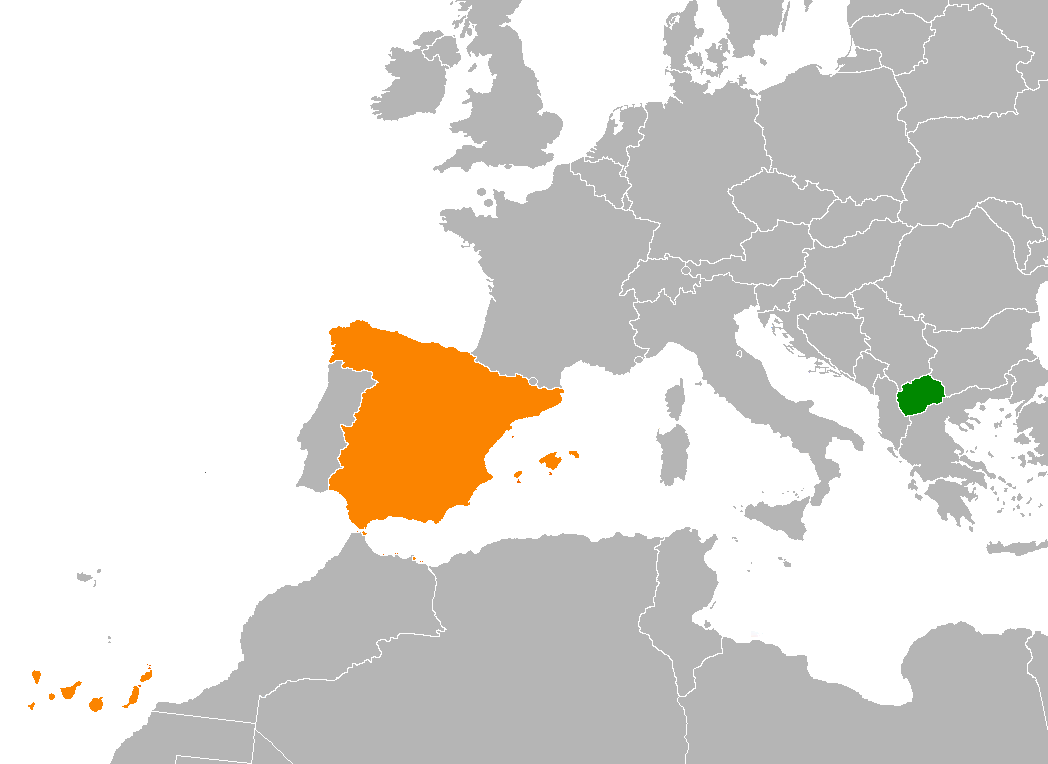

- North Macedonia: Spain

North Macedonia–Spain relations are the bilateral and diplomatic relations between these two countries. North Macedonia has an embassy in Madrid and three consulates in Barcelona, Madrid and Valencia. Spain has an embassy in Skopje. Both countries are members of the Council of Europe, and NATO. Also North Macedonia is an EU candidate and Spain is an EU member.

== Diplomatic relations ==
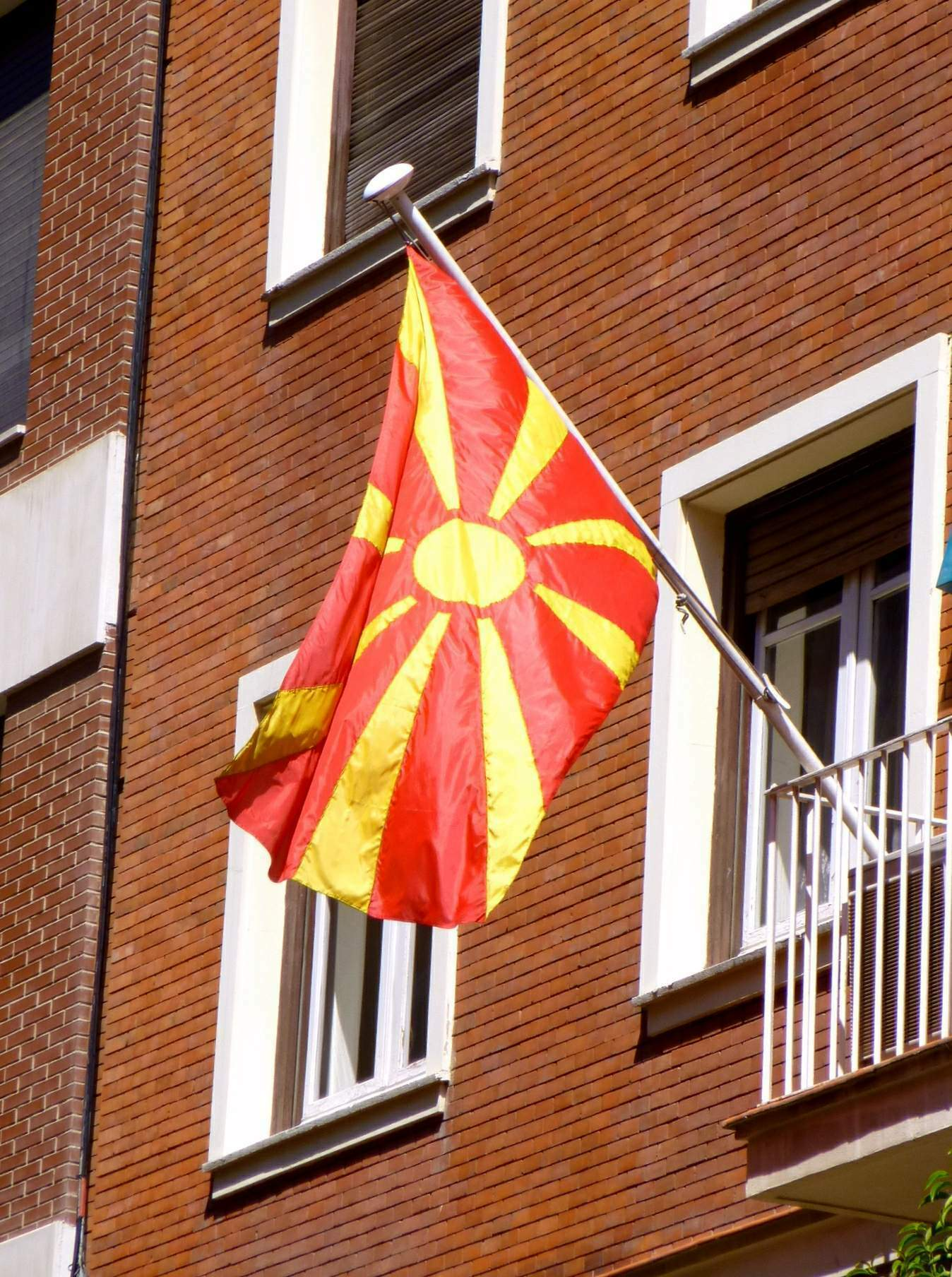
Embassy of North Macedonia in Madrid

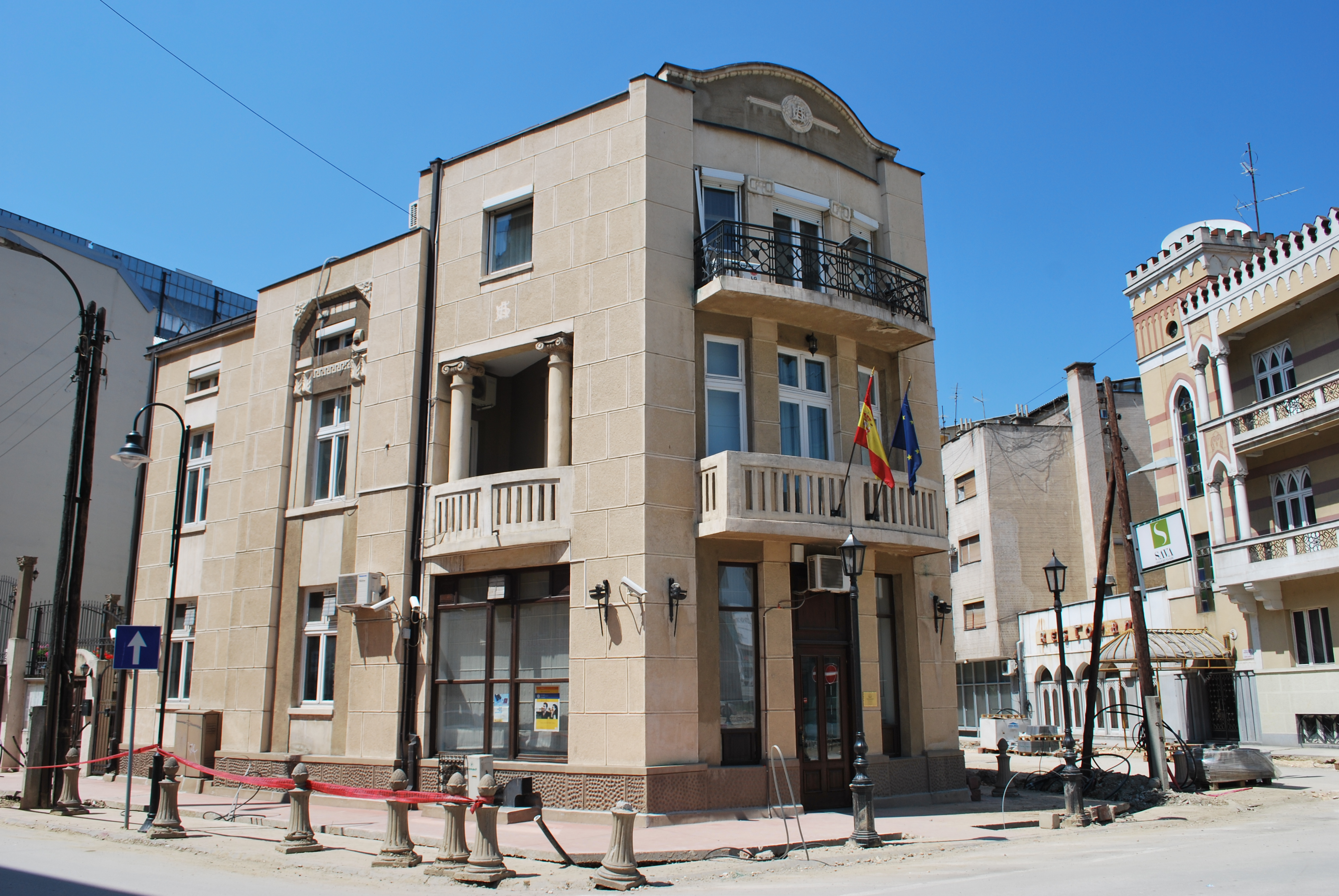
Embassy of Spain in Skopje

Currently, Spain does not maintain any dispute with North Macedonia. Spain supports the aspiration of Euro-Atlantic integration of the country. Spain and North Macedonia established diplomatic relations on July 28, 1994. The celebration of the 20th anniversary of this event took place in October 2014 in Skopje.

On April 9, 1999, Foreign Minister Abel Matutes traveled to North Macedonia to offer political and economic support and the unconditional adherence of the Spanish Executive to the Government of North Macedonia for his welcome to thousands of Albanian-Kosovar refugees, a result of the Kosovo crisis and the NATO bombings that began in March of that year.

On the occasion of the NATO summit in Washington on April 25, 1999, the then president of the Spanish Government, José María Aznar, pledged before the president of North Macedonia, Kiro Gligorov, to intensify the Spanish humanitarian aid to assist refugees from Kosovo. The permanent diplomatic mission of Spain in Skopje was created by R.D. 866/2006 of July 14. Mr. José Manuel Paz Agüeras was appointed first Ambassador of Spain with residence in Skopje, in North Macedonia through R.D. 1003/2006 of September 8. Between the two countries there is a fluid exchange of candidates for International Organizations.

Macedonian Prime Minister Zoran Zaev travelled to Spain in May 2021, paying a visit to the Senate and meeting Spanish Prime Minister Pedro Sánchez. This was the first official visit to Spain by a Macedonian head of government.

== Economic relations ==
Since 2001, trade between North Macedonia and Spain has been characterized by a significant deficit for Spain, with coverage that in 2010 was only 49%. This pattern changed significantly during 2012, 2013 and 2014, showing positive coverage rates for Spain.

In 2014, the main products exported from Spain to North Macedonia were meat products, women's clothing, ceramic products, animal feed, electronic components, automobiles, unprocessed tobacco and technical fabrics.

In the same year, the main products imported into Spain from North Macedonia were steel products, electrical equipment (24.7% of the total) followed by far by unprocessed clothing, footwear and tobacco.

According to data from DataInvex, the investment flows between the two countries are almost non-existent: Spanish investments in North Macedonia were −0'91, 0'12 and 0'09 million euros in 2009, 2010 and 2011 respectively. In 2012 they reached 0.2 million euros. DataInvex does not collect investment data in North Macedonia in 2013. The accumulated investments since 1993 are €157 million. DataInvex has not registered investments from North Macedonia in Spain since 2009, when they amounted to 3 million euros.

== Cooperation ==
Spain granted to North Macedonia an FAD loan for hydroelectric constructions worth 4 million euros from the Aid Funds development.

The Spanish fund to help meet the Millennium Goals has allocated $5 million to finance the United Nations Program for the Promotion of Dialogue and Inter-Ethnic Collaboration in North Macedonia, managed locally by UNDP, UNESCO and UNICEF.

In December 2006, under the auspices of the International and Ibero-American Foundation for Administration and Public Policies (FIIAAPP), a visit was made by Spanish experts who gave a seminar on community fund management. Spain was awarded a 22-month EU twinning on training for the fight against money laundering, with a resident Spanish expert who finished in August 2009. Between May 2010 and January 2012, a cooperation project on tax matters between the EU and North Macedonia led by Spain was developed. As of February 2011, an 18-month-old Ombudsman from North Macedonia was initiated, with a Spanish resident coordinator. It was a joint project presented by the offices of the Ombudsman of Spain and France, led by Spain. In December 2011, a second Franco-Spanish twinning for adult education began, with French leadership.

As of February 2016, two twinnings are under development. The first, aimed at improving the tax administration of North Macedonia began its execution during the month of February 2015. The second, on improving the environment, began its execution in April of the same year. A third and fourth projects are about to take off in 2016. The first is a twinning whose goal is to harmonize with the new insurance directive and the second (a “light” twinning, without a resident advisor) on matters to combat discrimination.

== See also ==
- Foreign relations of North Macedonia
- Foreign relations of Spain
- Accession of North Macedonia to the EU
- NATO-EU relations
- Spain–Yugoslavia relations
