= Sebastián de Romero Radigales =

Sebastián de Romero Radigales (20 January 1884 – 31 July 1970) was a Spanish diplomat who played a key role in efforts to rescue Jews in Greece during the Holocaust. Born in Graus, Aragon, he served as Spain’s consul in Athens during World War II. In recognition of his humanitarian work, he was posthumously awarded the title of Righteous Among the Nations by Yad Vashem in 2014.

== Early life and diplomatic career ==
Romero was born into a politically active bourgeois family. His father was a lifelong senator, and his brother José served as Minister of Agriculture in the 1930s under the government of the CEDA.

Although trained in law, Romero—following family advice—pursued a career in diplomacy. He held consular posts in New York, Tangier, Santiago de Cuba, and Belgrade until 1924. During General Miguel Primo de Rivera’s dictatorship, he was appointed consul in Bulgaria.

On 23 February 1927, King Ferdinand I of Romania appointed him consul in Galați, where he met his future wife, Elena Cutavá Anino. He was later posted to San Francisco (1929–1933) and Chicago (1934).

He served three terms as consul in Athens: 1937–1938, 1939–1940, and from April 1943 during the German occupation of Greece.

== Activities during the Holocaust ==
As consul in Nazi-occupied Greece, Romero sought to protect the Sephardi Jews of Greece, particularly those holding Spanish citizenship. He requested permission from Madrid to issue them entry permits to Spain, but the Spanish government was reluctant. Nevertheless, the Germans preferred that Spanish Jews be repatriated, and Romero’s efforts delayed their deportation to Bergen-Belsen.

On 18 March 1943, Madrid sent Romero a list of strict requirements Spanish Jews had to meet to re-enter Spain. Romero complied by issuing visas where possible, while seeking feasible evacuation options.

Initially, Spain proposed using Spanish ships, but Romero recommended using Swedish Red Cross vessels already active in Greek waters. Although Sweden agreed, Germany blocked the plan.

Subsequent negotiations proposed a train funded by the Spanish government, then by the deportees themselves. Spain later withdrew from this plan. On 22 July 1943, Romero was informed that Spanish Jews would be deported to Bergen-Belsen for at least two months, after which their fate could be fatal if Spain remained indifferent. Romero appealed for the women, children, and ill—but was ignored.

Without notifying Madrid, Romero collaborated with Italian forces to relocate Jews from Salonika to Italian-occupied areas. German authorities, alerted by Altenberg, ordered him to stop and barred the Jews from traveling to Athens—even if not headed to camps.

Romero persisted. With help from Ezra, a Spanish-Jewish representative, he arranged for Jews to travel with returning Italian soldiers to Italy.

On 2 August 1943, Jews of Spanish nationality from Salonika were deported to Bergen-Belsen. Romero safeguarded their belongings. Germany protested that not all targeted Jews were present—some had reached Italy—but avoided confrontation with Italy.

Following Italy’s surrender, Jews in Athens were forced to register with German authorities. In March 1944, 3,000 were arrested, including 150 Spanish citizens, and interned at Haidari camp. On 11 April, 155 Spanish Jews and 19 Portuguese Jews were deported to Bergen-Belsen. Thanks to Romero's efforts, they were placed in a neutral section of the camp with better conditions.

As Allied forces approached, one of three evacuation trains from Bergen-Belsen, departing 6 April 1945, included Jews from Greece—among them Spanish and Portuguese nationals.

On 30 September 1944, Romero reported that he had housed Jews who escaped deportation in a hotel once owned by a deported Greek Jew. He also intervened to prevent the deportation of six captured Jews, negotiating with German authorities to have them report weekly to police instead.

On 17 August 1944, Spain authorised Romero to arrange the transfer of 25 Jews at a time, under the condition that each group leave Spain before another could enter. Romero protested the inefficiency of this system and requested a higher quota and automatic visas—both requests were denied.

In June 1944, Romero unsuccessfully attempted to transfer 155 Jews from Bergen-Belsen to Spain.

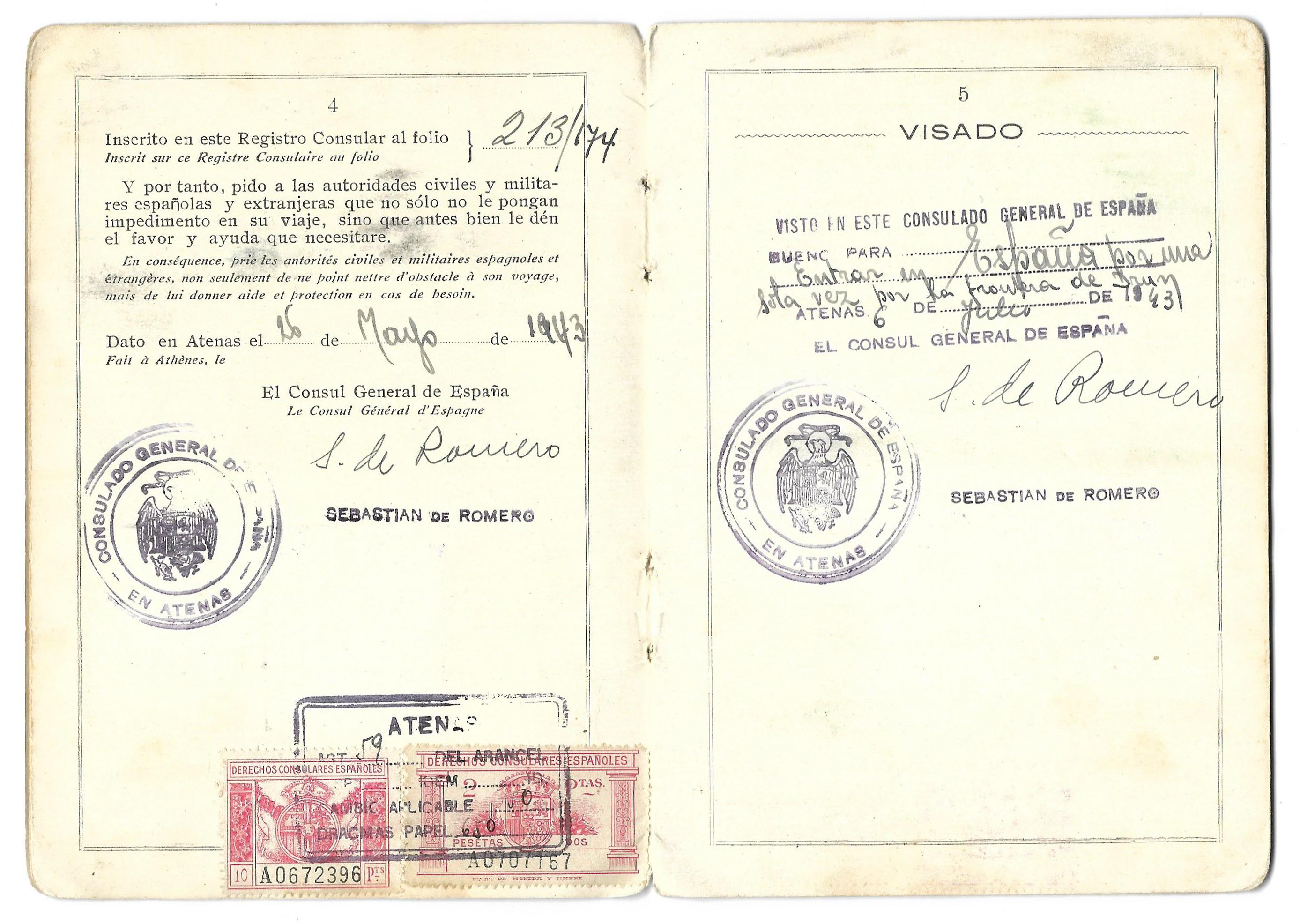
Spanish passport issued in Athens by Romero for a Jewish couple in 1943.

== Later life and honours ==
After the war, Romero remained in Athens and served in various diplomatic roles under Francisco Franco. He was appointed ambassador in 1950 and received the Grand Cross of the Order of Civil Merit on 18 July 1954. He was also made an honorary member of the Greek Parnassos Literary Society.

He retired to his family estate, “Villa Elena,” in Graus, where he died in 1970.

On 30 September 2014, Romero was posthumously recognized as Righteous Among the Nations by Yad Vashem. The award was received by his granddaughter at a ceremony in Jerusalem.

== See also ==
- Spain during World War II
- Spanish Civil War
- CEDA
