= Julián Ayesta =

Spanish playwright and novelist

Julián Ayesta (1919–1996) was a Spanish playwright and novelist. Born in Gijón, he pursued a diplomatic career after his studies. He served in Spanish legations in Beirut, Bogotá, Amsterdam, Vienna and the former Yugoslavia, where he was the Spanish ambassador before the country's final disintegration.

Primarily a playwright, he is best known today for his short novel Helena o el mar del verano (1952), an evocative memoir of summer holidays, childhood and first love. The book has been reissued many times and translated in many languages, including an English translation by Margaret Jull Costa under the title Helena, or the Sea in Summer.

Ayesta died in 1996.
