= Spain–Yugoslavia relations =

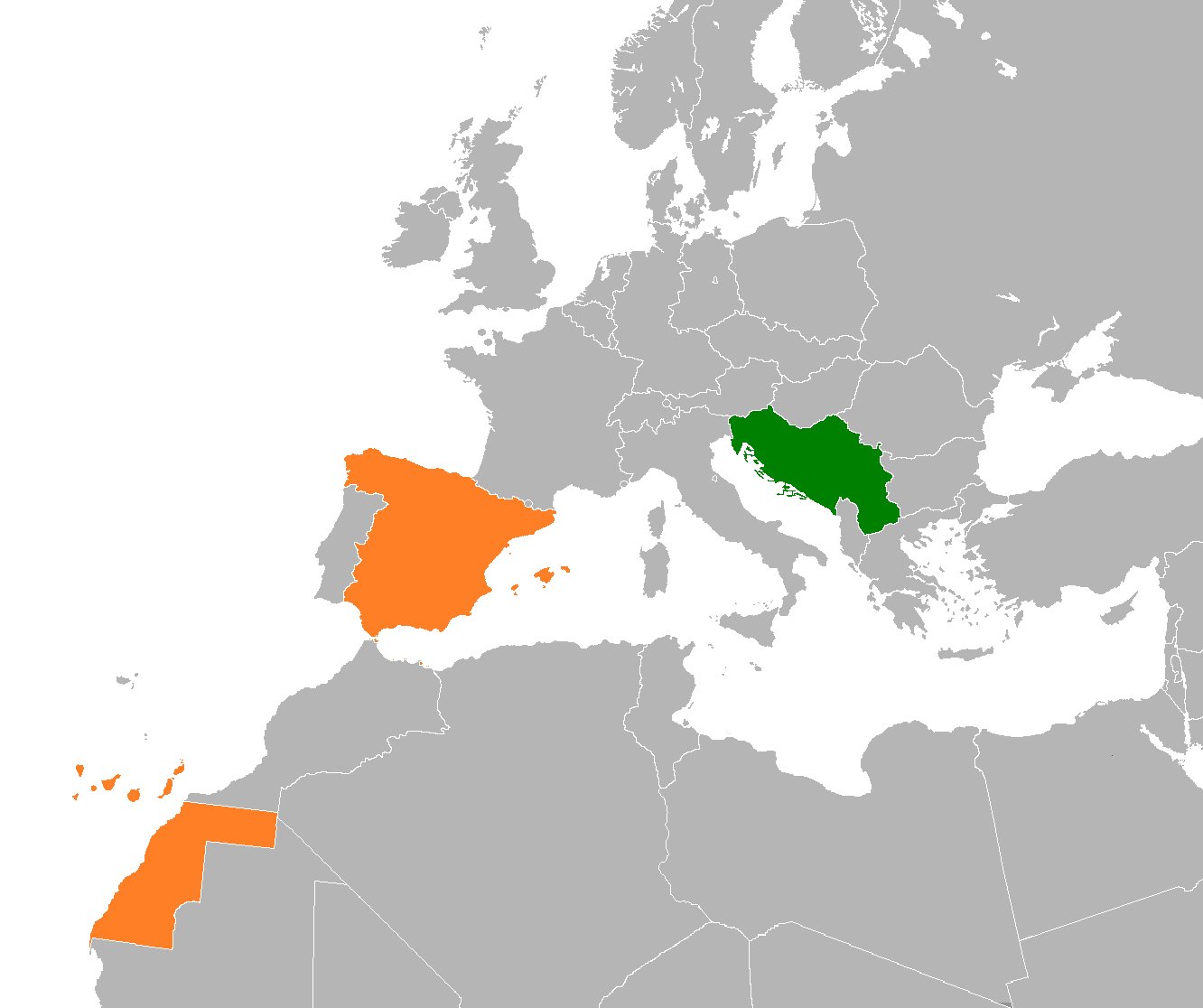

- Spain: Yugoslavia

Spain–Yugoslavia relations were post-World War I historical foreign relations between Spain (Restoration Spain, Second Spanish Republic, Francoist Spain or Spanish Republican government in exile and contemporary kingdom till 1992) and the now divided Yugoslavia (Kingdom or Socialist Federal Republic of Yugoslavia).

== History ==
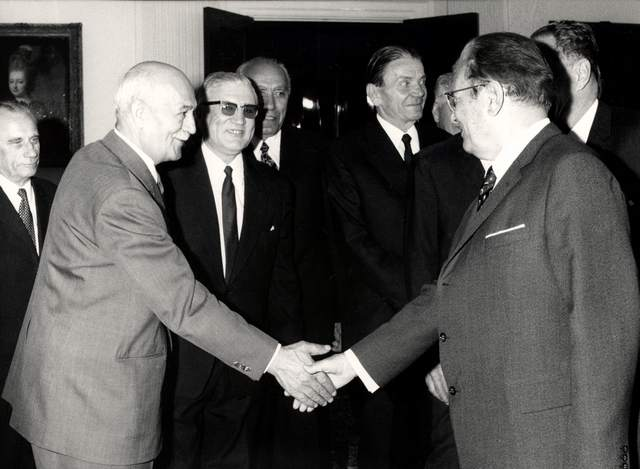
Association of Yugoslav volunteers in Spanish Civil War meeting with President of Yugoslavia Josip Broz Tito.

=== Interwar period and the Spanish Civil War ===
During the interwar years, famous Serbian poet Jovan Dučić (1919-1921) and Ivo Andrić (1928-1929, 1961 recipient of the Nobel Prize in Literature) were serving as ambassadors of the newly founded Kingdom of Yugoslavia to Spain. At the same time Kalmi Baruh was in Spain on scholarship received from the Spanish Government studying for the post-doctoral historical studies in the Spanish center of Historical Studies, Madrid. Yugoslav volunteers in the Spanish Civil War, known as Spanish fighters was a contingent of approximately 2000 volunteers that fought for the Second Spanish Republic during the Spanish Civil War.

=== World War II ===
Some Spaniards were imprisoned in a subcamp of the Mauthausen concentration camp at the Ljubelj Pass in German-occupied Yugoslavia.

=== Cold War period ===
Department of Hispanic Studies of the University of Belgrade was founded in 1971 while Luis Miguel Dominguín bull fight (event protested against by an animal welfare group) attracted 5000 spectators in the same year. Yugoslavia refused to establish formal relations with Franco's regime which postponed appointment of the first Spanish ambassador in Belgrade till 1977. The first official visit of the Spanish monarch to Yugoslavia was organized in 1985.

=== Yugoslav Wars ===
In 1991 Minister of Foreign Affairs of Spain Francisco Fernández Ordóñez proposed to the Foreign Affairs Council of the European Community to initiate a quick recognition and enlargement procedure with Yugoslavia as the only way to prevent the breakup of the country. Spain preferred to be perceived as the neutral player in the region during the conflict but its foreign policy was generally sympathetic towards Serbia which was perceived as the core state of former multinational and diverse Yugoslav state. It was against Spanish political instincts to recognize independence of Croatia and Slovenia at the time of Breakup of Yugoslavia, yet as a new member state of the European Community country was reluctant to break the European unity.

== See also ==
- Yugoslavia–European Communities relations
- Yugoslavia and the Non-Aligned Movement
- Death and state funeral of Josip Broz Tito
- Spain at the 1984 Winter Olympics
- Independent Olympic Participants at the 1992 Summer Olympics
- 1979 Mediterranean Games
- Yugoslavia in the Eurovision Song Contest 1969
- Spain in the Eurovision Song Contest 1990
- Bosnia and Herzegovina–Spain relations
- Croatia–Spain relations
- Montenegro–Spain relations
- North Macedonia–Spain relations
- Serbia–Spain relations
- Slovenia–Spain relations

== Sources ==
- Pavlaković, Vjeran (2016). Yugoslav Volunteers in the Spanish Civil War (PDF). Belgrade: Rosa Luxemburg Stiftung. ISBN 978-86-88745-17-8.
