= Claude-France Arnould =

French diplomat

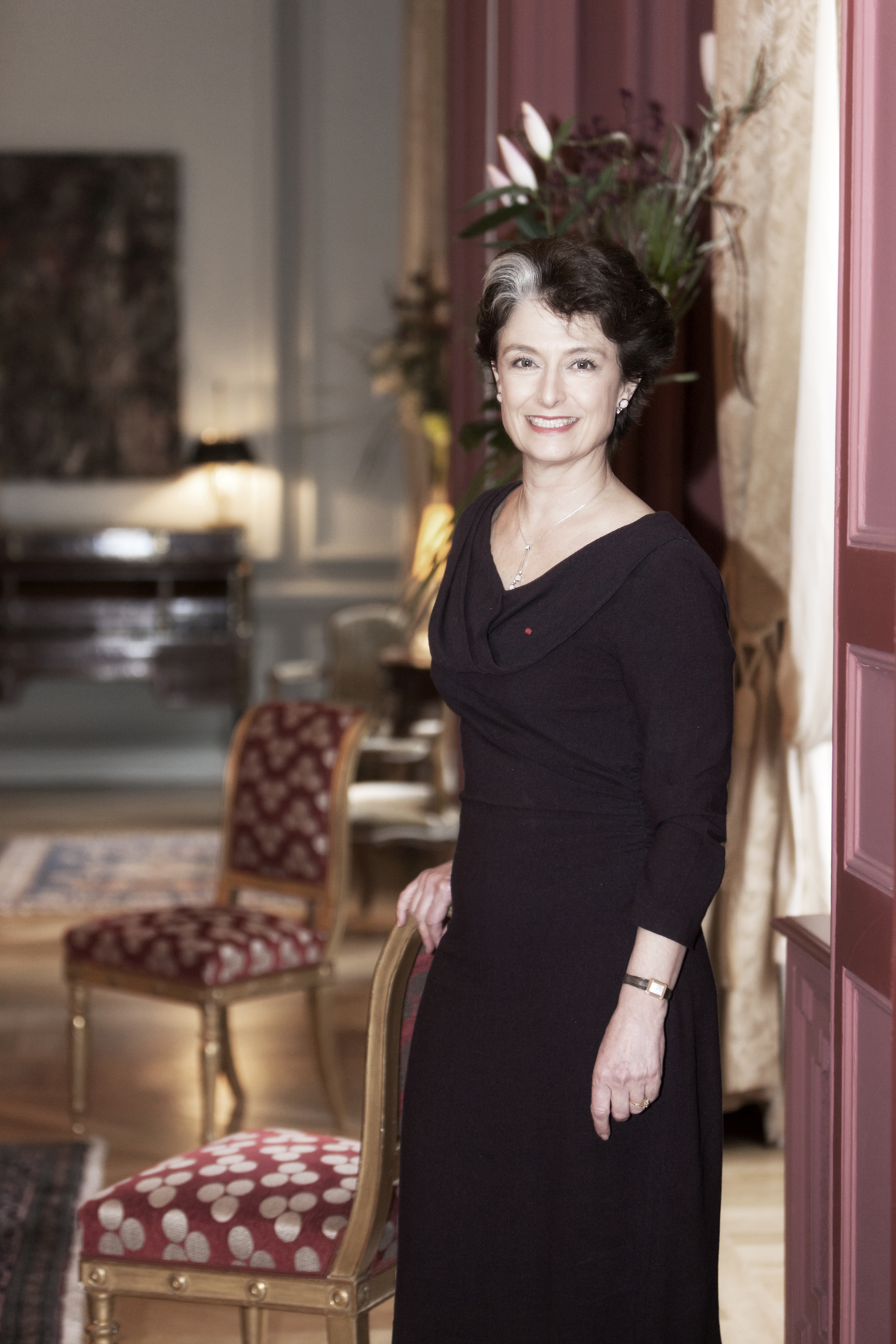
- Incumbent
- Assumed office 1 October 2015
- Preceded by: Bernard Valero

Personal details
- Born: 14 August 1953 (age 72)

Claude-France Arnould (born 14 August 1953) is a French diplomat. She was Chief Executive of the European Defence Agency from 17 January 2011 until 31 January 2015. She was Ambassador of France to Belgium from October 2015 to April 2019.

== Honors ==
- Officer of the Legion of Honour
- Officer of the National Order of Merit
- Officer of the Order of Merit of the Federal Republic of Germany
- Officer of the Spanish Crosses of Military Merit (Grand cross)
