= Serbia–Spain relations =

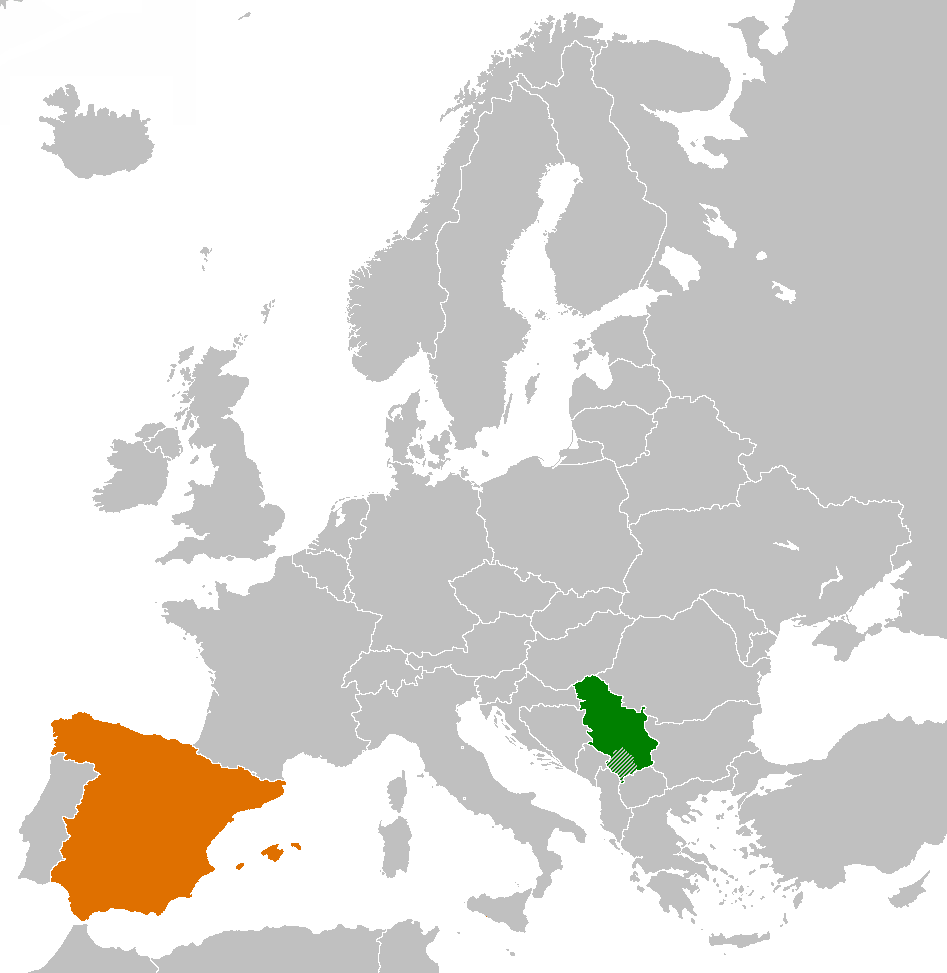
- Serbia: Spain

Diplomatic mission
- Embassy of Serbia in Madrid: Embassy of Spain in Belgrade

Serbia and Spain maintain diplomatic relations established in 1916. From 1918 to 2006, Spain maintained relations with the Kingdom of Yugoslavia, the Socialist Federal Republic of Yugoslavia (SFRY), and the Federal Republic of Yugoslavia (FRY) (later Serbia and Montenegro), of which Serbia is considered shared (SFRY) or sole (FRY) legal successor.

== History ==
After Expulsion of Jews from Spain in 1492 by the Catholic Monarchs ruling Castile and Aragon many Sephardi Jews settled in Balkan provinces of what was then Ottoman Empire. With the rise of nationalism among Orthodox Christians of Ottoman Empire they have organised rebellions against Muslim ruling elite starting with the 1804 Serbian Revolution against Ottoman rule. Revolution was running in parallel with the Napoleonic Wars. Process of decline of the Ottoman Empire will continue until the end of First Balkan War in 1913 with the gradual reconquest of the Balkan peninsula by newly independent states and southward retreat of Ottoman Empire. In 1882 philosopher and senator Ángel Pulido is writing how one Sephardic merchant at the market in Belgrade told him "I am not Spanish from there [Spain], but Spanish from the East." In the same year Milan I was awarded with the Order of Charles III on the occasion of his proclamation as the King of Serbia. In 1895 Đorđe Popović-Daničar have published the first translation of Don Quixote into Serbian which according to him was "the best novel in the world". In his translation undertaking he was helped by Sephardi Jew Hajim Davičo. In 1903 Vicente Blasco Ibáñez arrived at Belgrade on the Orient Express service where he stated that city is "relatively cosmopolitan, with trams, cafes, and theaters, but full of nervous military men, women wanting to imitate French fashion and drunk orthodox priests". Since 1910 Spain had one diplomatic representative in the Kingdom of Serbia, Mr Francisco Serrat i Bonastre, who stayed at that function throughout the Balkan Wars all until the 1914 and the beginning of World War I which began after the Assassination of Archduke Franz Ferdinand, July Crisis and Austria-Hungary declares war on Serbia.

=== World War I and the interwar years ===
Serbian Campaign of World War I resulted in Serbia losing a third of its entire population. After the Serbian Army's retreat through Albania, which resulted in more than 200,000 deaths, the country's government together with some of its population settled at the Greek island of Corfu. Spain was a neutral power in the war but one which was actively involved in mediation among the conflicting parties. At one point Spain was involved in the provision and protection of 1,500 Serbian children and the release of 100 prisoners of war in Banja Luka in 1917. The Serbian Government on Corfu and Spain established diplomatic relations in 1916 and in the same year the first Serbian ambassador arrived at Madrid.

During the interwar years, famous Serbian poet Jovan Dučić (1919–1921) and Ivo Andrić (1928–1929, 1961 recipient of the Nobel Prize in Literature) were serving as ambassadors of the newly founded Kingdom of Yugoslavia to Spain. At the same time Kalmi Baruh was in Spain on scholarship received from the Spanish Government studying for the post-doctoral historical studies in the Spanish center of Historical Studies in Madrid.

=== Post-Franco Spanish-Yugoslav relations ===
The relations between the Socialist Federal Republic of Yugoslavia and the Kingdom of Spain were relatively cordial since the end of Francoist period in Spain. They were mostly kept at the diplomatic level as Spain was focusing on its integrations into European Community and NATO. Some among the Spanish politicians were considering the option to follow the Yugoslav Non-Aligned Movement way like Malta and Cyprus did at the time. Future Spanish foreign minister Miguel Ángel Moratinos served in Belgrade as a young diplomat in the 1980s. Spanish presence in Yugoslavia would later be transferred to Serbia and would not be completely cut of even during the years of sanctions against Serbia and Montenegro.

=== Yugoslav Wars ===
In 1991, the Minister of Foreign Affairs of Spain Francisco Fernández Ordóñez proposed to the Foreign Affairs Council of the European Community to initiate a quick recognition and enlargement procedure with Yugoslavia as the only way to prevent the breakup of the country. Spain preferred to be perceived as the neutral player in the region during the conflict but its foreign policy was generally sympathetic towards Serbia which was perceived as the core state of former multinational and diverse Yugoslav state. It was against Spanish political instincts to recognize independence of Croatia and Slovenia at the time of breakup of Yugoslavia, yet as a new member state of the European Community country was reluctant to break the European unity. At the time, newly united Germany was the strongest advocate of independence for Croatia and Slovenia with all 12 members of the European Community, as well as Austria and Switzerland following German push for recognition.

Under the leadership of José María Aznar, the Spanish Government had decided that the Spanish Armed Forces would be a part of the coalition enacting the 1999 NATO bombing of Yugoslavia. Out of 16 NATO member states at the time, 13 took part in the intervention. The member states that did not partake in the bombings were Iceland, which maintained no standing army; Luxembourg with a very small standing army; and Greece as the only major member state which expressed strong opposition to the intervention. 38% of Spanish citizens supported the participation of Spain and 42% of them opposed it. At the same time all of the Spanish political parties in parliament, with the exception of the radical left which held 23 out of 350 seats, voted in favor of Spanish participation in NATO intervention. Javier Solana was the NATO Secretary-General at the time of intervention. Spanish F-18s were among the first planes to strike targets in Serbia; Aznar's Government supported subsequent interventions in Afghanistan and Iraq as well.

== Political relations ==
In 2009 Minister of Foreign Affairs of Spain Miguel Angel Moratinos urged the Government of Netherlands to unblock Serbia's Stabilization and Association Agreement with the European Union which at the time was already signed but its implementation had been blocked by the Netherlands. After the Council's recommendation of February 2012, Serbia received full candidate status on March that year. In 2013 the European Council endorsed the Council of Ministers conclusions and recommendations to open accession negotiations with Serbia. Spain is strongly supporting Serbia's accession negotiations. On the meeting of European External Action Service in 2018 Spanish representatives together with some of those from Visegrád Group required to get actively involved in the EU facilitated Belgrade–Pristina negotiations.

Serbian president Aleksandar Vučić visited Spain in 2022, with scheduled meetings with king Felipe VI and prime minister Pedro Sánchez, seeking to seal the purchase of two military aircraft C-295. In July 2022, in the wake of a visit to the Western Balkans (including Serbia) of Spanish prime minister Pedro Sánchez and a meeting with Serbian president Aleksandar Vučić, the former stressed the Spanish support to the advance in Serbia's EU membership negotiations, also declaring that "international law and the territorial integrity of nations must be respected" in relation to Kosovo.

=== Spain's stance on Kosovo ===
Spain is one of five member states of the European Union (other being Greece, Cyprus, Romania and Slovakia) that does not recognize unilateral declaration of independence of Kosovo and is actively opposing its membership in international organisations such as UNESCO and Interpol. In addition, Spain is supporting Serbia's insistence on establishment of Community of Serb Municipalities in Kosovo as provided by the 2013 Brussels Agreement signed under the auspices of the European Union.

=== Serbia's stance on Catalonia ===
Serbia strongly supported Spanish territorial integrity during the 2017–2018 Spanish constitutional crisis, with Serbian Foreign Minister stating that Spain is one of the best international friends of Serbia.

=== High-level visits ===
==== Spanish officials in Serbia ====
- 26 February 2007; Miguel Ángel Moratinos (Minister of Foreign Affairs and Cooperation) visits Belgrade and Priština.
- 17 and 18 September 2007; Bernat Soria (Minister of Health) attends 57th Session of the Committee Regional Office of WHO in Belgrade.
- 10 January 2009; Miguel Ángel Moratinos (Minister of Foreign Affairs and Cooperation) visits Belgrade.
- 11 December 2009; Miguel Ángel Moratinos (Minister of Foreign Affairs and Cooperation) visits Belgrade.
- 20 April 2010; Miguel Ángel Moratinos (Minister of Foreign Affairs and Cooperation) visits Belgrade.
- 28 and 29 March 2011; Diego López Garrido (Secretary of State for the European Union) visits Belgrade.
- 14 June 2011; Trinidad Jiménez (Minister of Foreign Affairs and Cooperation) visits Belgrade.
- 4-6 September 2011; Juan Antonio Yañez-Barnuevo (Secretary of State for Foreign Relations) attends 50th Anniversary Non-Aligned Movement Meeting in Belgrade.
- 14 October 2011; María Luisa Cava de Llano (Acting Ombudsman) visits Serbia.
- 16 March 2012; Miguel Cardena (Secretary of State for Sport) attends XII Conference of the Council of European Ministers of Sport in Belgrade.
- 21 and 22 March 2012; Jorge Fernández Díaz (Minister of the Interior) visits Serbia.
- 21 and 22 November 2012; Fernando García Sánchez (Chief of the Defence Staff) visits Serbia.
- 2-4 December 2015; Ignacio Ybáñez (Secretary of State for Foreign Relations) visits Serbia.
- 23 and 24 May 2016; José Manuel García-Margallo (Minister of Foreign Affairs and Cooperation) together with Fernando Eguidazu (Secretary of State for the European Union) visits Serbia.
- 22 June 2017; Juan López Herrera (Director General for Bilateral Relations with European Union Countries) and José Martín y Pérez de Nanclares (Head of the International Law Division) visits Serbia.
- 20 July 2017; Enrique Mora (Director General for Foreign Policy) visits Serbia.
- 30 November 2017; Jorge Toledo (Secretary of State for the European Affairs) and Juan López Herrera (Director General for Bilateral Relations with European Union Countries) visits Serbia.
- 18-20 July 2017; José Manuel Maza (Attorney General of the State) attends "Twinning" project closure in Belgrade.

==== Serbian officials in Spain ====
- 18 July 2007; Vuk Jeremić (Minister of Foreign Affairs) visits Madrid.
- 9 and 10 October 2007; Vuk Jeremić (Minister of Foreign Affairs) attends OSCE Conference of Ministers of Foreign Relations on the topic of discrimination of Muslims in Madrid.
- 29 and 30 November 2007; Vuk Jeremić (Minister of Foreign Affairs) attends OSCE Conference of Ministers of Foreign Relations in Madrid and meets Miguel Ángel Moratinos.
- 14 December 2007; Dušan Spasojević (acting Minister of Defense) visits Madrid and meets the State Secretary for Defense.
- December 2007; Snežana Malović (Minister of Justice) visits Madrid.
- 15 January 2008; Vuk Jeremić (Minister of Foreign Affairs) attends I Forum of the Alliance of Civilizations in Madrid and meets with Miguel Ángel Moratinos.
- 22 April 2008; Vuk Jeremić (Minister of Foreign Affairs) visits Madrid where he meets with Miguel Ángel Moratinos.
- 4 July 2008; Vuk Jeremić (Minister of Foreign Affairs) visits Madrid.
- 1 December 2008; Vuk Jeremić (Minister of Foreign Affairs) and Ivica Dačić (Minister of Internal Affairs) visits Madrid.
- 9 March 2009; Boris Tadić (President of Serbia) and Vuk Jeremić (Minister of Foreign Affairs) visits Madrid.
- 23 February 2010; Vuk Jeremić (Minister of Foreign Affairs) visits Madrid.
- 31 January 2011; Ivica Dačić (Vice Prime Minister and Minister of Internal Affairs) signing of bilateral agreement on fight against crime and organized crime.
- 6 October 2011; Mirko Cvetković (Prime Minister of Serbia) attends Hispanic-Serbian Business Forum in Madrid.
- 10 April 2012; Snežana Malović (Minister of Justice) visits Madrid.
- 3 May 2012; Vuk Jeremić (Minister of Foreign Affairs) visits Madrid.
- 28 May 2013; Suzana Grubješić (Vice Prime Minister for European Integrations of Serbia) visits Madrid.
- 6 June 2017; Katarina Lalić (Vice Prime Minister) attends OSCE Conference in Málaga.
- 8 June 2017; Ivica Dačić (Minister of Foreign Affairs) visits Madrid.
- 19-21 July 2017; Jana Ljubičić (Delegate from the Ministry of the Internal Affairs) and Vladimir Rebić (Director of the Serbian Police) visits Madrid.
- 26 and 27 September 2017; Ivica Dačić (Minister of Foreign Affairs) attends opening of the Honorary Consulate of Serbia in Zaragoza.

== Economic relations ==
Trade between two countries amounted to $1.1 billion in 2023; Spain's merchandise exports were standing at roughly $723 million; Serbia's exports to Spain were about $372 million.

Spanish companies present in Serbia include Viscofan (with packaging plant in Jagodina), Refisa (auto-parts plant in Kragujevac), and Teknia (auto-parts plant in Kragujevac). Inditex through its stores (Zara, Bershka, Massimo Dutti, Oysho, Pull&Bear, Stradivarius) is the biggest fashion retailer in Serbia.

== Cultural cooperation ==
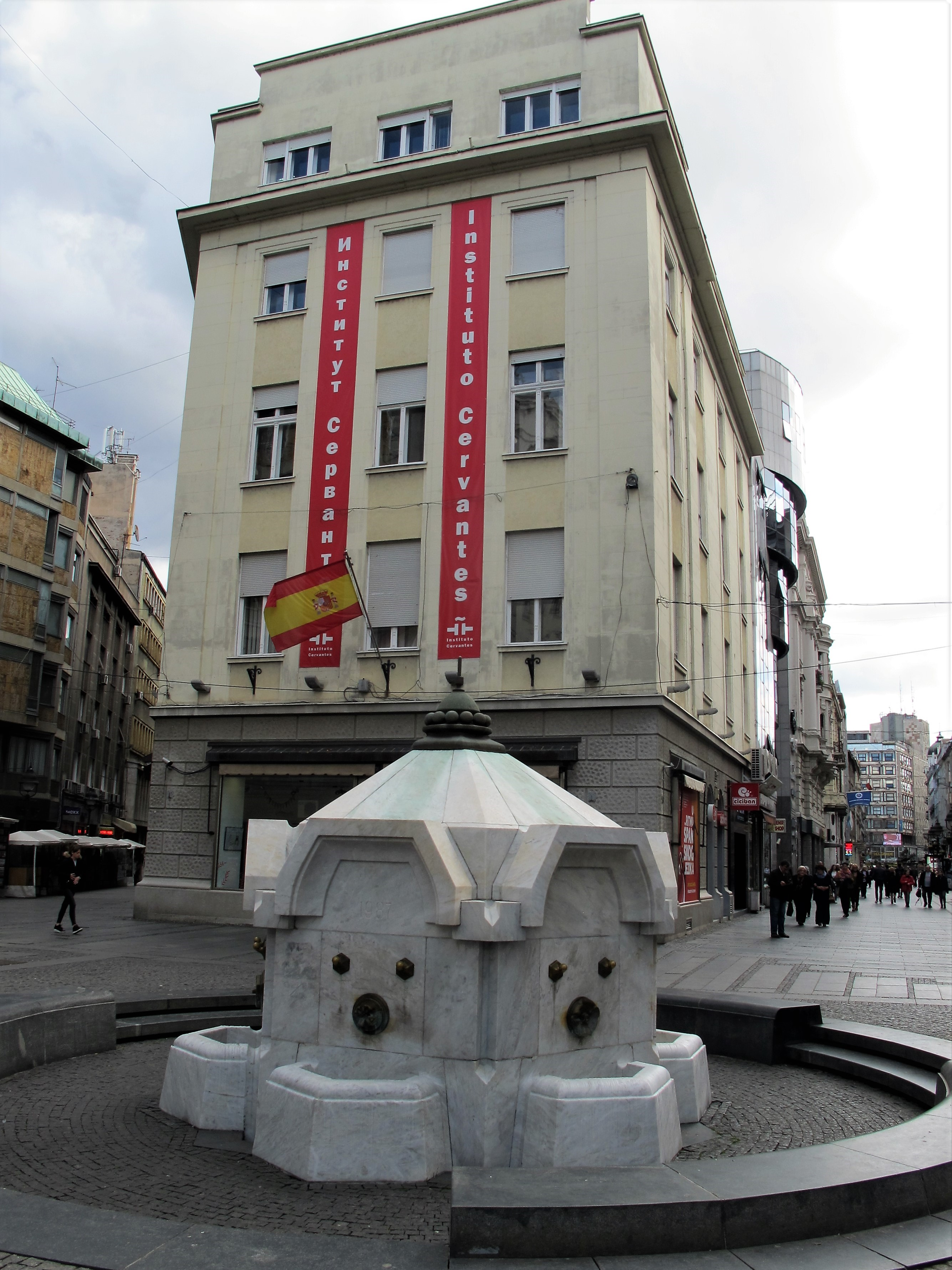
Instituto Cervantes in Belgrade

Instituto Cervantes, cultural centre devoted to the Spanish and Hispanic American culture and Spanish language has been operating in Belgrade since 2004.

In his novel "Danube: A Sentimental Journey from the Source to the Black Sea", Italian novelist Claudio Magris is describing 1734 settlement of Spaniards in the town of Bečkerek in modern-day Serbian province of Vojvodina where they have established a so-called New Barcelona. Northern Serbian city of Zrenjanin is mentioned in the novel "Waiting for Robert Capa" (under its old name of Petrovgrad) of Spanish author Susana Fortes. Jewish protagonist's brothers who are running from persecution, are settling in Petrovgrad, just on the border with Romanian, because as protagonist claim, there was never tradition of antisemitism in Zrenjanin.

== Resident diplomatic missions ==
- Serbia has an embassy in Madrid.
- Spain has an embassy in Belgrade.
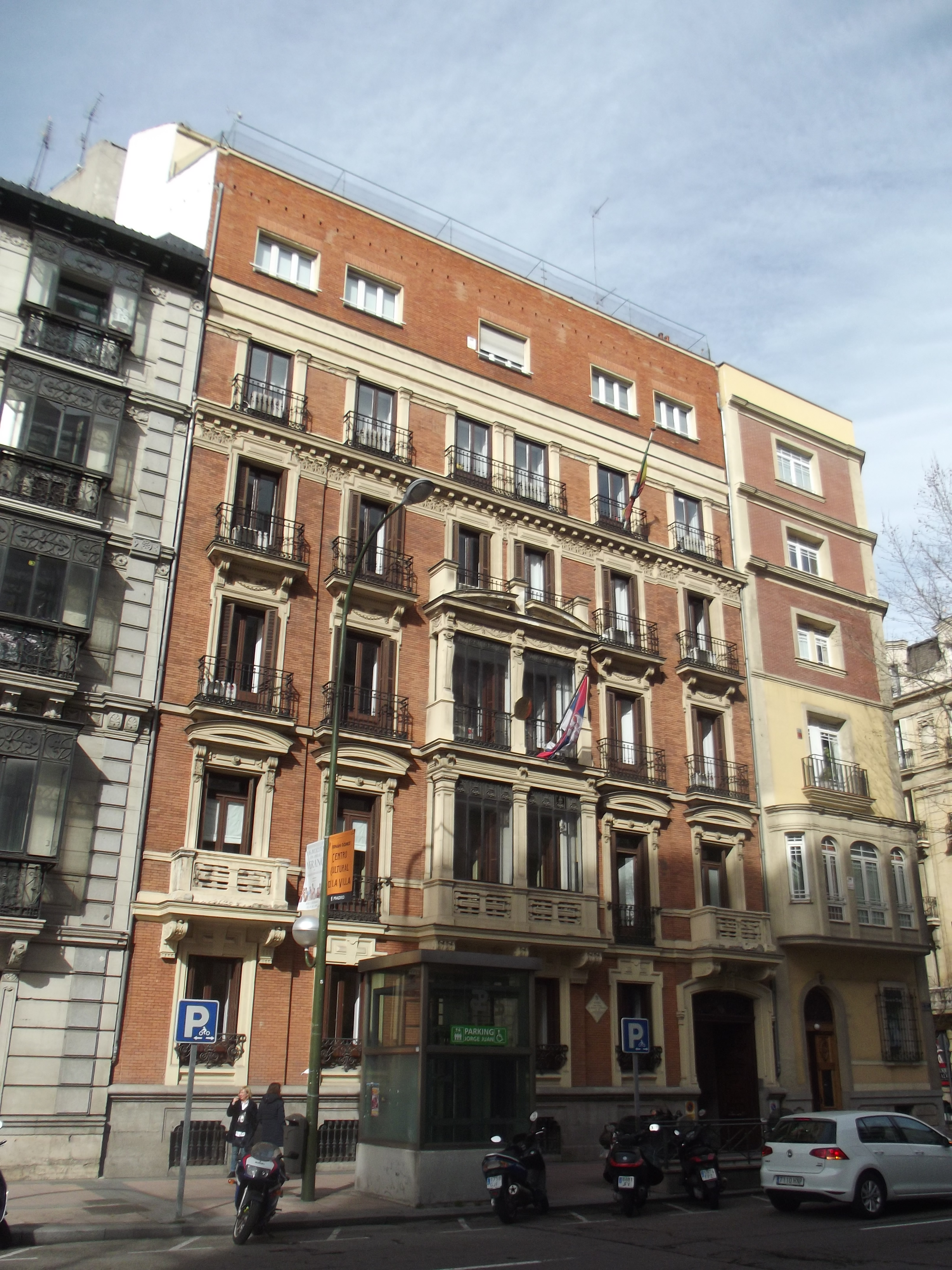
Embassy of Serbia in Madrid

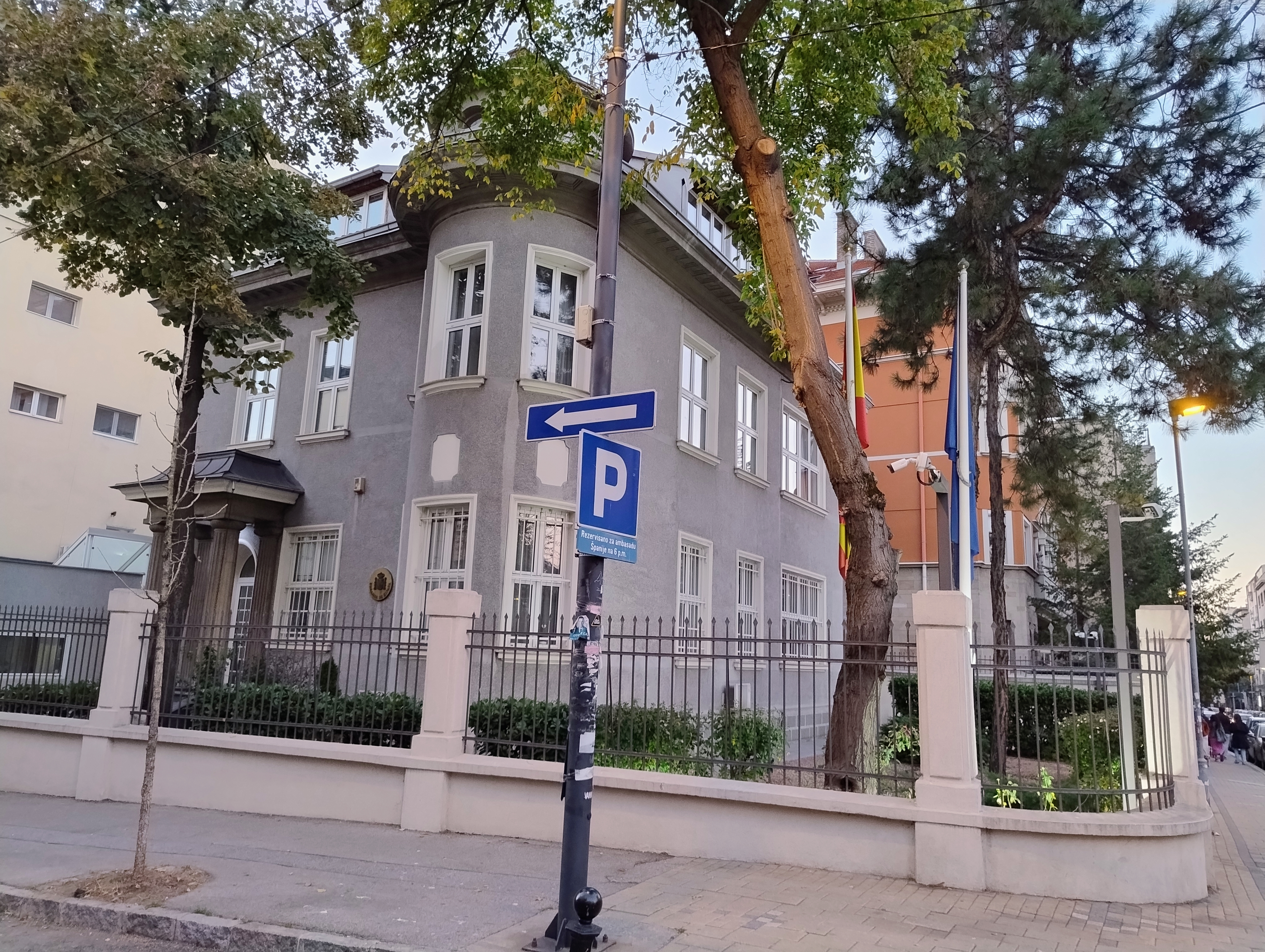
Embassy of Spain in Belgrade

== See also ==
- Foreign relations of Serbia
- Foreign relations of Spain
- Serbia-NATO relations
- Accession of Serbia to the EU
- Serbs in Spain
- Yugoslav volunteers in the Spanish Civil War
- Spain–Yugoslavia relations
