= Corruption in Bosnia and Herzegovina =

Corruption in Bosnia and Herzegovina describes the prevention and occurrence of corruption in Bosnia and Herzegovina. A general public survey on corruption from Transparency International shows that citizens perceive Bosnia and Herzegovina's political structures to be deeply affected by corruption. Two-thirds of citizens believe that the government's efforts to combat corruption are ineffective.

On Transparency International's 2025 Corruption Perceptions Index, Bosnia and Herzegovina scored 34 on a scale from 0 ("highly corrupt") to 100 ("very clean"). When ranked by score, Bosnia and Herzegovina ranked 109th among the 182 countries in the Index, where the country ranked first is perceived to have the most honest public sector. For comparison with regional scores, the best score among Eastern European and Central Asian countries (Note: Albania, Armenia, Azerbaijan, Belarus, Bosnia and Herzegovina, Georgia, Kazakhstan, Kosovo, Kyrgyzstan, Moldova, Montenegro, North Macedonia, Russia, Serbia, Tajikistan, Turkey, Turkmenistan, Ukraine, Uzbekistan) was 50, the average score was 34 and the worst score was 17. For comparison with worldwide scores, the best score was 89 (ranked 1), the average score was 42, and the worst score was 9 (ranked 181, in a two-way tie).

== Dynamics ==
Corruption levels are considered high in Bosnia and Herzegovina and have created stumbling blocks in its bid for future EU membership, according to the EU's Progress Report in 2013. The country's complex legal and regulatory frameworks create opportunities for corruption. Facilitation payments are seen as pervasive throughout the Bosnian business climate.

== Anti-corruption efforts ==
The government has set up the 2009-2014 Strategy for the Fight against Corruption and prosecuted several high-profile cases, yet the overall enforcement of the legislative and institutional frameworks remains poor.

=== Enhancing Civil Society Participation ===
Citizens participation and the values of integrity, accountability, and transparency are crucial components of fighting corruption. It is important to develop programs and actions to change the cultural understanding of corruption and help citizens to act against abuses.
