= Greece–Spain relations =

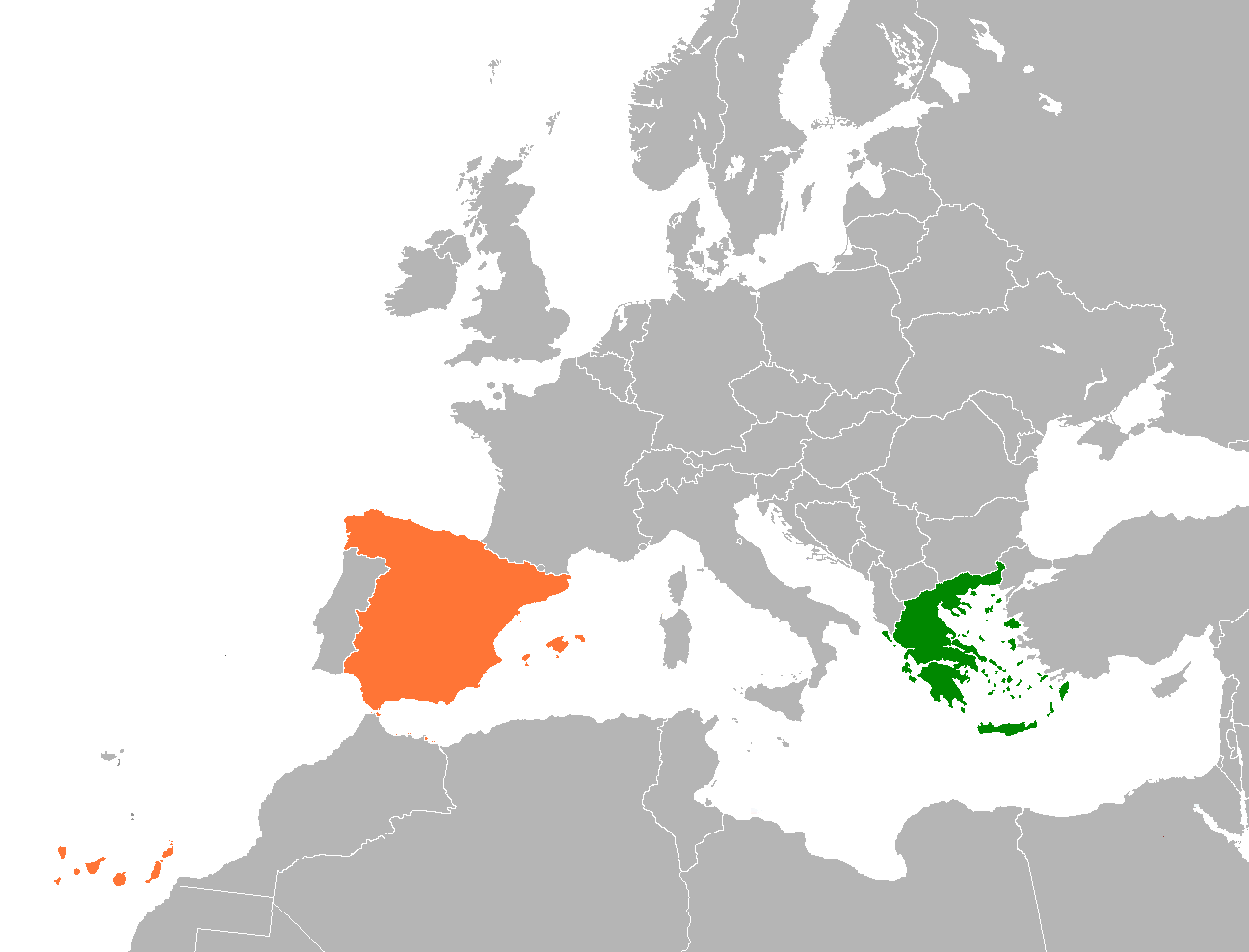
- Greece: Spain

Diplomatic mission
- Embassy of Greece, Madrid: Embassy of Spain, Athens

Both Greece and Spain are members of the European Union, NATO, the Organization for Security and Co-operation in Europe, the OECD, the Union for the Mediterranean, and the United Nations.

== History ==
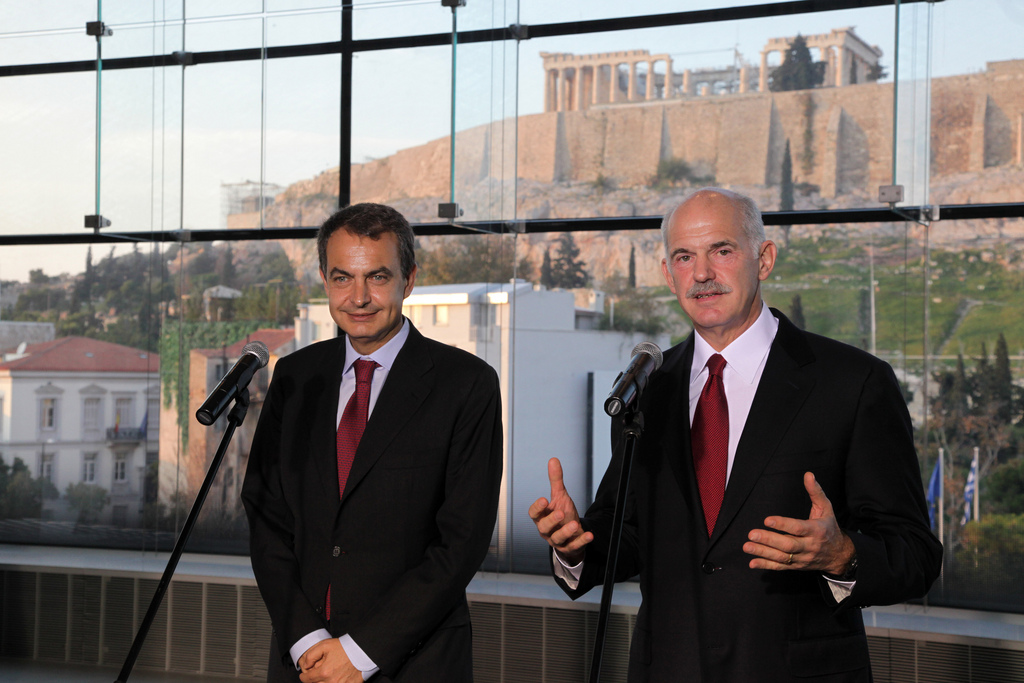
George Papandreou with Jose Luis Zapatero in Athens (2010)

In ancient times, parts of the Mediterranean coast of Spain were colonized by Greeks (Emporion/Empúries and Rhodha/Roses, Girona, plus Zacantha/Sagunt and Dianion/Denia near Valencia). In the late Middle Ages, parts of Greece came under Aragonese rule (the Duchy of Athens and the Duchy of Neopatras). The Renaissance painter Domenikos Theotokopoulos (better known as El Greco) was of Greek descent, as is Queen Sophia of Spain. Another cultural link between the two countries is the Sephardi Jewish community of Greece, particularly the Jews of Thessaloniki, who traditionally spoke Judaeo-Spanish. Both countries are the doors of Europe and share the same Greco-Latin and Mediterranean culture, together with Italy and Portugal.

In Spain there is great interest in the language and literature of Ancient and Modern Greece. A nucleus of neo-Hellenists is very active in the area of popularizing modern Greek letters. In addition, approximately 5,000 Greeks reside in Spain. The vast majority of them reside in Madrid, Catalonia, the Balearic Islands, and the Valencian Community.

The close Turkish-Spanish collaboration in the military sector, sealed with the signing of a military agreement in November 2021, has caused "frictions" in the relations between Spain and Greece. A December 2021 meeting between foreign ministers Dendias and Albares failed to deliver a common position on the matter.

== List of bilateral agreements ==
The following are existing agreements between the countries. Note that no treaties exist.

- Agreement on scientific and technological cooperation (1972)
- Air Cooperation agreement (1975)
- Agreement on the Avoidance of Double Taxation of Income or Capital (2000).

A Spanish military contingent participated in a NATO mission to assist Greece in ensuring security during the 2004 Summer Olympics. The two countries also share close positions in relation to the international status of Kosovo.

== List of bilateral visits ==
- February 6–7, 2006: visit of Spanish Foreign Minister Miguel Ángel Moratinos to Athens
- July 10, 2008: visit of Spanish Prime Minister José Luis Rodríguez Zapatero to Athens

== Resident diplomatic missions ==
- Greece has an embassy in Madrid.
- Spain has an embassy in Athens.

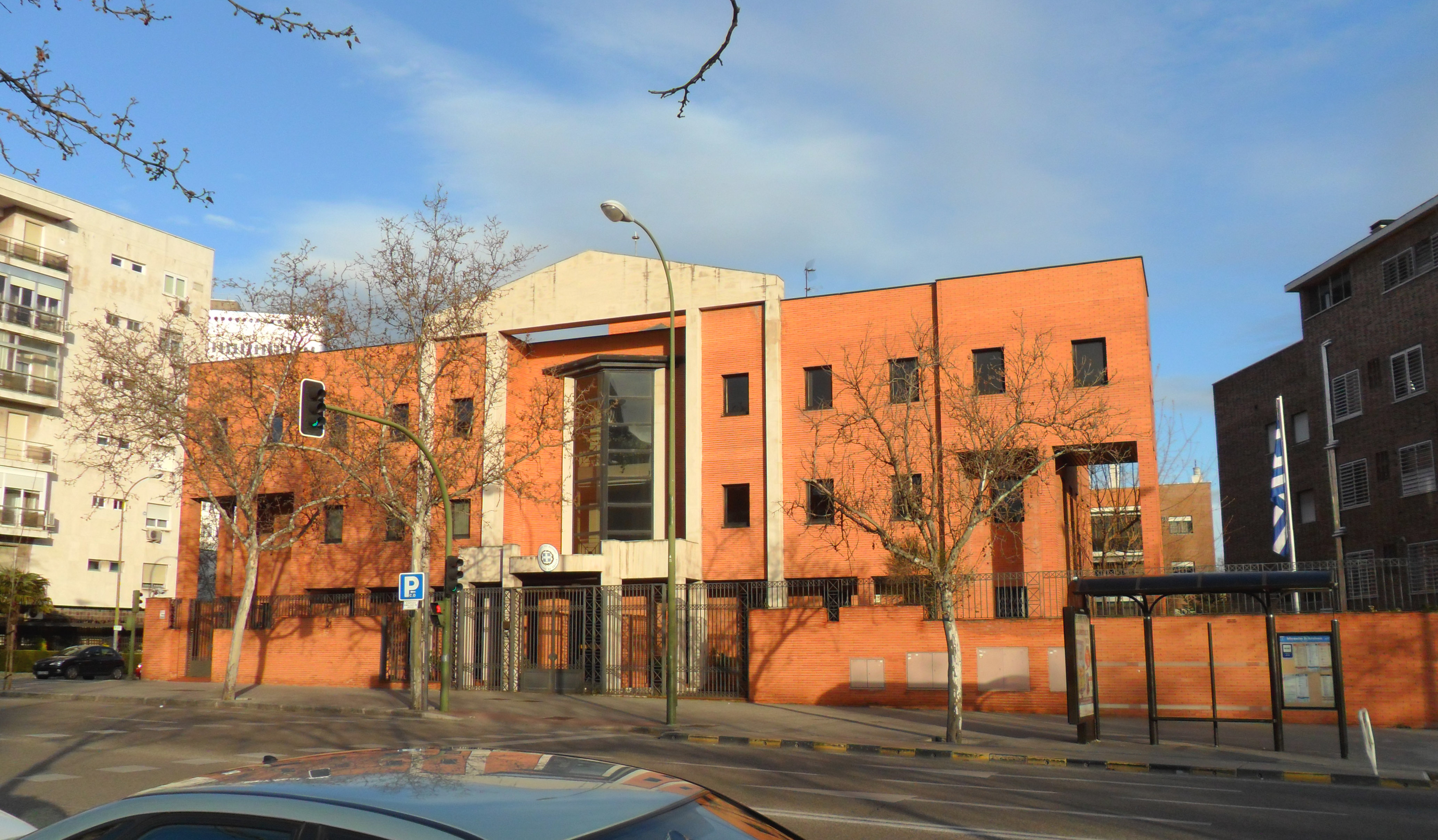
Embassy of Greece in Madrid

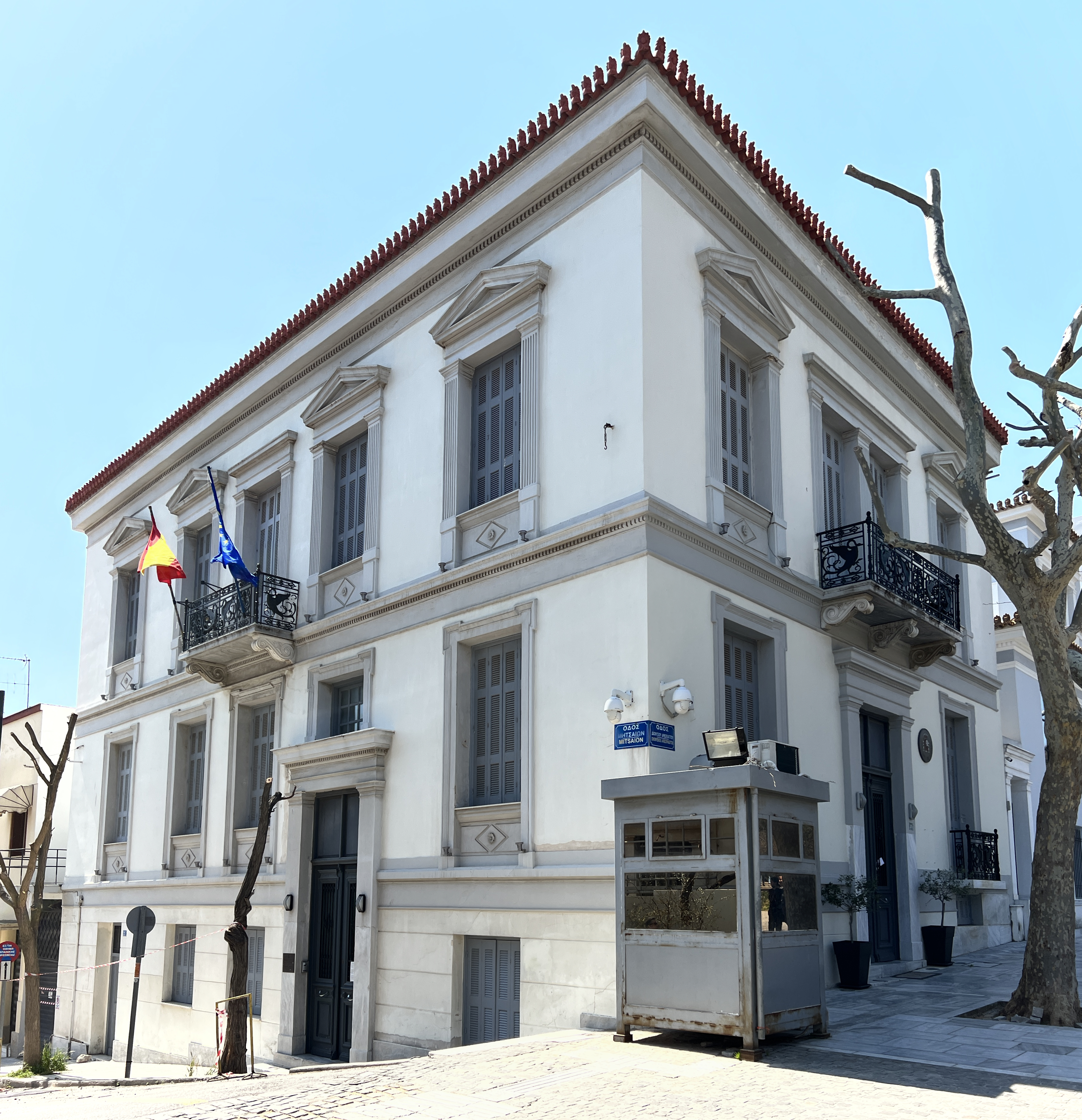
Embassy of Spain in Athens

== See also ==
- Foreign relations of Greece
- Foreign relations of Spain
- Greeks in Spain
- Spaniards in Greece
- Queen Sofía of Spain
