= Ricardo Díez-Hochleitner Rodríguez =

Spanish diplomat (born 1953)

Ricardo Díez-Hochleitner

Secretary-General of the Royal Household
- In office 2002–2011
- Monarch: Juan Carlos I
- Preceded by: Alberto Aza Arias
- Succeeded by: Alfonso Sanz Portolés

Personal details
- Born: Ricardo Díez-Hochleitner Rodríguez; 30 June 1953 (age 73) Bogotá, Colombia
- Children: 3
- Education: Autonomous University of Madrid

Ricardo Díez-Hochleitner Rodríguez (born 30 June 1953) is a retired Spanish diplomat and civil servant.

== Career ==
Hochleitner has a degree of law from the Autonomous University of Madrid, and is the son of the professor, diplomat and honorary president of the Club of Rome, Ricardo Díez-Hochleitner.

=== As Ambassador ===
He entered the Diplomatic Career in 1979 and has served as chief of staff to the Minister of Foreign Affairs, secretary at the Spanish embassy in Germany, deputy director-general of Community Coordination for Commercial Customs Affairs and deputy and director-general for Community Technical Coordination. In 1993 he was named ambassador of Spain to the Dominican Republic and, later, director of the International Department of the Prime Minister's Office and ambassador of Spain in Austria, Slovenia and Bosnia-Herzegovina. In 2000, he became Director-General of Foreign Policy for Europe.

=== Royal Household of Spain ===
From 2002 to 2011 he was Secretary-General of the House of His Majesty the King, under diplomat Alberto Aza. In 2011 he became the Spanish Ambassador to the Organisation for Economic Co-operation and Development (OECD). From 2015 to 2024, he served as ambassador to the Kingdom of Morocco, after having sounded his name for the Portuguese embassy. He is member of the European Academy of Sciences and Arts.
