= List of ambassadors of Spain to Sudan =

Ambassador of Spain to Sudan
- Coat of arms of Spain
- Incumbent; Daniel Losada Millar since 25 February 2026
- Ministry of Foreign Affairs; Secretariat of State for Foreign Affairs
- Style: The Most Excellent
- Residence: Khartoum; Cairo (since 2023)
- Nominator: The Foreign Minister
- Appointer: The Monarch
- Term length: At the government's pleasure
- Inaugural holder: Ángel Sagaz Zubelzu
- Formation: 1967
- Website: Mission of Spain to Sudan

The ambassador of Spain to Sudan is the official representative of the Kingdom of Spain to the Republic of the Sudan. It is also accredited to the State of Eritrea and the Republic of South Sudan.

In October 1963, Spain appointed its ambassador in Cairo as envoy extraordinary and minister plenipotentiary to Sudan. Diplomatic relations were formally established on 20 February 1964 and, in February 1967, a non-resident embassy was established in Khartoum. In 1970 a chargé d'affaires, Julián Ayesta, dependent on the embassy in Cairo, was posted in the Sudanese capital and, three years later, the first resident ambassador was appointed.

The embassy was closed in 1992 and its services were transferred to the ambassador to Egypt. In 2006, Spain reopened its embassy in Khartoum after almost 14 years, but it was closed again in 2023 due to the battle of Kartoum. Since then, the ambassador resides in Cairo. In February 2026, the government appointed a special envoy for Sudan instead of an ambassador to Sudan, South Sudan and Eritrea. In August 2026, the special envoy was formally appointed as ambassador.

After the independence of South Sudan, it is also accredited to this country.

== Jurisdiction ==
- Sudan: The Embassy of Spain in Khartoum manages Spain–Sudan relations. Since 2023, its operations are suspended.

The ambassador is also accredited to:

- Eritrea: Diplomatic relations between the two countries were established on 5 October 1993. Spain has an honorary vice-consul in Asmara.
- South Sudan: Spain recognized South Sudan's independence immediately and accredited the ambassador to Sudan as ambassador to South Sudan. Spain has an honorary consular office in Juba.

In the past, this position served as ambassador to Somalia (1978–1984), Yemen (1989–1992) and South Yemen (1989–1990).

== List of ambassadors ==
This list was compiled using the work "History of the Spanish Diplomacy" by the Spanish historian and diplomat Miguel Ángel Ochoa Brun. The work covers up to the year 2000, so the rest is based on appointments published in the Boletín Oficial del Estado.

Name	Rank	Term
Manuel Valdés Larrañaga (Note: Resident in Cairo.); Marquess of Avella	Minister	1963–1964
Miguel María de Lojendio Irure	Minister	1964–1966
Ángel Sagaz Zubelzu	Minister	1966–1967
Ángel Sagaz Zubelzu	Ambassador	1967–1970
Julián Ayesta Prendes	Chargé d'affaires	1970–1973
José Manuel del Moral y García Sáenz	Ambassador	1973–1978
Manuel Sassot Cañadas (Note: Accredited to Somalia.)	Ambassador	1978–1979
Juan Luis Maestro de León Boletti	Ambassador	1979–1984
Herminio Morales Fernández	Ambassador	1985–1988
José Pedro García-Trelles Dadín (Note: Accredited to Yemen and South Yemen.)	Ambassador	1988–1989
Fernando Martínez Westerhausen	Chargé d'affaires	1989–1990
Tomás Solís Gragera (Note: Accredited to Yemen.)	Ambassador	1990–1992
Eudaldo Mirapeix	Ambassador	1992–1995
Juan Alfonso Ortiz Ramos	Ambassador	1995–2000
Pedro López de Aguirrebengoa	Ambassador	2001–2006
Ramón Álvarez-Novoa Sánchez	Ambassador	2006–2008
María Teresa Daurella de Nadal (Note: Accredited to Eritrea.)	Ambassador	2008–2011
Ramón Gil-Casares	Ambassador	2011–2012
Juan González-Barba Pera (Note: Accredited to Eritrea and South Sudan.)	Ambassador	2012–2015
Juan José Rubio de Urquía	Ambassador	2015–2018
Alberto José Ucelay Urech	Ambassador	2018–2021
Isidro Antonio González Afonso	Ambassador	2021–2025
Daniel Losada Millar (Note: Special Envoy for Sudan)	Ambassador	2026–pres.

== See also ==
- Spain–Sudan relations
