= List of ambassadors of Spain to Syria =

Ambassador of Spain to Syria
- Coat of arms of Spain
- Incumbent; Antonio González-Zavala Peña since 26 August 2026
- Ministry of Foreign Affairs; Secretariat of State for Foreign Affairs
- Style: The Most Excellent
- Residence: Damascus; Beirut (2012–2026)
- Nominator: The Foreign Minister
- Appointer: The Monarch
- Term length: At the government's pleasure
- Inaugural holder: Ramón Sáenz de Heredia
- Formation: 1956
- Website: Mission of Spain to Syria

The ambassador of Spain to Syria is the official representative of the Kingdom of Spain to the Syrian Arab Republic. The embassy is not operational and diplomatic and consular affairs are handled by a chargé d'affaires based in Beirut.

Spain began to show interest in the Middle East —not counting Jerusalem— in the mid-19th century. Agreements with the Ottoman Empire allowed the establishment of consulates in several provinces of the empire, among them, the Consulate-General for Syria and Palestine, located in Beirut, with Antonio Bernal de O'Reilly as its first consul. Spain also had a Vice-Consulate in Damascus. Precisely, during this time the consul had to intervene due to the 1860 civil conflict in Mount Lebanon and Damascus; at this time, a Spanish convent in Damascus was looted and the religious were murdered, and Spain claimed a compensation.

Almost a century later, on 3 April 1948, Spain, under the dictatorship of Francisco Franco, established diplomatic relations with the First Syrian Republic. In May 1949, Joaquín Castillo y Caballero, 6th Marquess of Castro de Torres, was appointed Envoy Extraordinary and Minister Plenipotentiary, resident in Beirut. In 1956, Ramón Sáenz de Heredia y de Manzanos, who had been minister to Siria since 1954, was granted the rank of ambassador, elevating the diplomatic relations to the highest level. Briefly, between 1958 and 1962, during the United Arab Republic, the embassy was merged with that in Cairo, and the diplomatic representation in Damascus was downgraded to Consulate-General.

As a result of the Syrian civil war, tensions began between the two governments. In February 2012, Spanish ambassador in Damascus was recalled and, the following month, the embassy was closed indefinitely. In May 2012, diplomatic relations were definitely halted after Spain expelled the Syrian ambassador and four other diplomats. Following the collapse of the regime of Bashar al-Assad, Spain appointed a special envoy to Syria to support the chargé d'affaires and raised the Spanish flag at the Embassy after 12 years. In August 2026, the special envoy was formally appointed as ambassador.

== List of ambassadors ==
Ambassador		Term	Nominated by	Appointed by	Accredited to
Envoy Extraordinary and Minister Plenipotentiary
-	Joaquín Castillo Caballero (Note: Resident in Beirut, Lebanon.); Marquess of Castro de Torres	1 May 1949 – 20 March 1953 (3 years, 323 days)	Alberto Martín-Artajo	Francisco Franco	Husni al-Za'im
-	Pelayo García-Olay Alvarez	30 March 1953 – 30 July 1954 (1 year, 122 days)	Alberto Martín-Artajo	Francisco Franco	Fawzi Selu
-	Ramón Sáenz de Heredia	30 July 1954 – 4 March 1956 (1 year, 218 days)	Alberto Martín-Artajo	Francisco Franco	Hashim al-Atassi
Ambassador Extraordinary and Plenipotentiary
1	Ramón Sáenz de Heredia	4 March 1956 – 8 June 1956 (96 days)	Alberto Martín-Artaj	Francisco Franco	Shukri al-Quwatli
2	Juan José Pradera Ortega	8 June 1956 – 22 February 1958 (1 year, 259 days)	Alberto Martín-Artaj	Francisco Franco	Shukri al-Quwatli
Embassy in Damascus merged with the Embassy in Cairo. Diplomatic mission downgraded to Consulate-General.
3	Miguel María de Lojendio Irure	16 March 1962 – 6 April 1964 (2 years, 21 days)	Fernando María Castiella	Francisco Franco	Nazim al-Qudsi
4	Juan José Rovira y Sánchez Herrero	17 April 1964 – 13 November 1969 (5 years, 210 days)	Fernando María Castiella	Francisco Franco	Amin al-Hafiz
5	Nuño Aguirre de Cárcer	7 February 1970 – 21 August 1972 (2 years, 196 days)	Gregorio López-Bravo	Francisco Franco	Nureddin al-Atassi
6	Gabriel Mañueco de Lecea	21 August 1972 – 20 April 1976 (3 years, 243 days)	Gregorio López-Bravo	Francisco Franco	Hafez al-Assad
7	José Joaquín Zavala y Alcíbar-Jáuregui	20 April 1976 – 8 June 1978 (2 years, 49 days)	The Count of Motrico	Juan Carlos I	Hafez al-Assad
8	Félix Guillermo Fernández-Shaw Baldasano	28 August 1978 – 21 March 1983 (4 years, 205 days)	The Marquess of Oreja	Juan Carlos I	Hafez al-Assad
9	Felipe de la Morena y Calvet	18 April 1983 – 26 February 1987 (3 years, 314 days)	Fernando Morán	Juan Carlos I	Hafez al-Assad
10	Jesús Carlos Riosalido Gambotti	23 March 1987 – 1 August 1990 (3 years, 131 days)	Francisco Fernández Ordóñez	Juan Carlos I	Hafez al-Assad
11	Gil Armangué Ríus	1 August 1990 – 20 August 1993 (3 years, 19 days)	Francisco Fernández Ordóñez	Juan Carlos I	Hafez al-Assad
12	Manuel Gómez de Valenzuela	31 August 1993 – 15 January 1998 (4 years, 137 days)	Javier Solana	Juan Carlos I	Hafez al-Assad
13	Javier Navarro Izquierdo	15 January 1998 – 17 November 2001 (3 years, 306 days)	Abel Matutes	Juan Carlos I	Hafez al-Assad
14	Manuel Cacho Quesada	8 December 2001 – 14 May 2005 (3 years, 157 days)	Josep Piqué	Juan Carlos I	Bashar al-Assad
15	Juan Ramón Serrat	25 June 2005 – 21 August 2010 (5 years, 57 days)	Miguel Ángel Moratinos	Juan Carlos I	Bashar al-Assad
16	Julio Albi de la Cuesta	21 August 2010 – 21 December 2012 (Note: Recalled since February 2012.) (2 years, 122 days)	Miguel Ángel Moratinos	Juan Carlos I	Bashar al-Assad
Chargé d'affaires, resident in Beirut.
-	Santiago Jiménez Martín	September 2012 – August 2015 (2 years, 334 days)	-		
-	Juan Criado Clemente	August 2015 – August 2019 (4 years, 0 days)	-		
-	José Antonio Ruiz de Casas	August 2019 – August 2021 (2 years, 0 days)	-		
-	Mariana de Jesús Figueroa Sánchez	August 2021 – August 2024 (3 years, 0 days)	-		
-	Francisco Javier Puga Llopis	August 2024 – 26 August 2026 (2 years, 25 days)	-		
Ambassador Extraordinary and Plenipotentiary
17	Antonio González-Zavala Peña (Note: He served as Special Envoy to Syria from 24 December 2024 to 26 August 2026.)	26 August 2026 – present (12 days)	José Manuel Albares	Felipe VI	Ahmed al-Sharaa

== See also ==
- Spain–Syria relations
