= Ambassadors of Spain =

Ambassadors of Spain are government officials appointed by the Spanish monarch on the advice of the Ministry of Foreign Affairs to act as diplomatic representatives to foreign nations, international organizations, and as ambassadors-at-large. These appointments do not require any type of confirmation by the Cortes Generales, although the Constitution prevents the government and, therefore, its representatives, from entering into certain international agreements without its authorization.

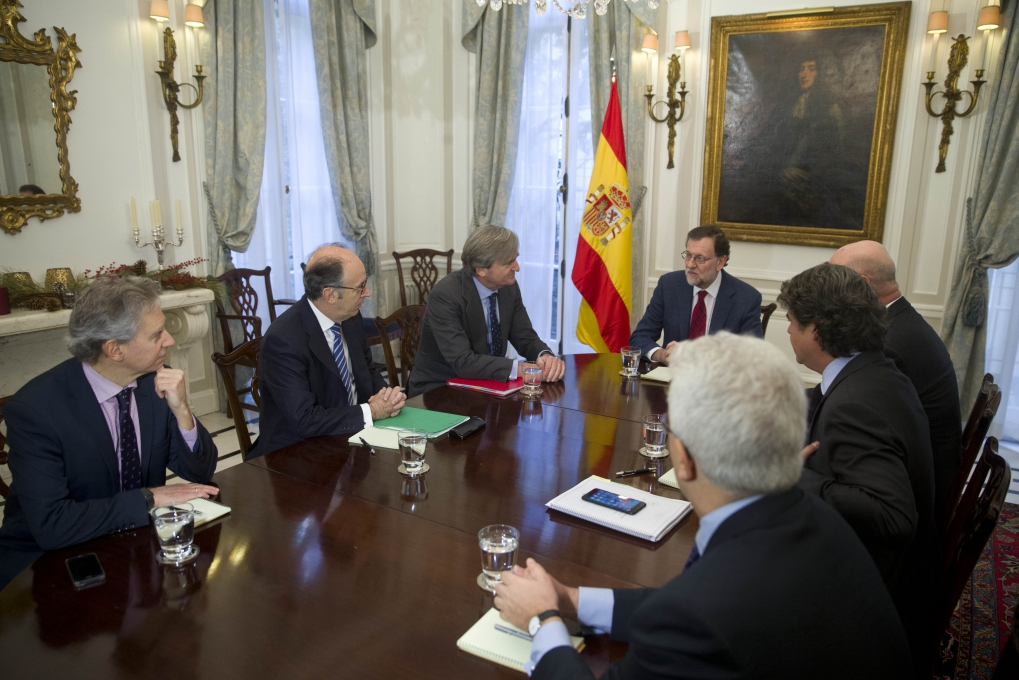
Mariano Rajoy meets Spanish ambassadors based in the United States before the UNSC meeting that approved Resolution 2331

Ambassadors report to the Minister of Foreign Affairs and, depending on the matter or geographical area, also answer to the Ministry's secretaries of state or directors-general. They do not have a fixed term of office, serving at the pleasure of the government. However, it is an unwritten custom that diplomats serve for at least four years.

According to the 2014 State Foreign Action and Service Act, article 44(4), "Extraordinary and Plenipotentiary Ambassadors, Permanent Representative Ambassadors, and Chargés d'Affaires shall be appointed from among officials of the Diplomatic Service in the manner determined by regulations, without prejudice to the Government, in the exercise of its discretionary power, being able to appoint as Ambassadors persons who do not belong to the Diplomatic Service". Thus, in Spain there are two types of ambassadors: career diplomats and political appointees. As of August 2024, there are only five "political" ambassadors.

== Current ambassadors of Spain ==
This list is made up based on information provided by a public list compiled by the Spanish Ministry of Foreign Affairs, European Union and Cooperation. Last update was made on 10 October 2026. Also, the work "History of the Spanish Diplomacy" by diplomat and historian Miguel Ángel Ochoa Brun is used for historical data (until 2000). The date of establishment is the date when the diplomatic relations were first established; it also shows, if there were previous relations, the year in which it was elevated to the rank of embassy.

Political appointees, that is, they are not part of the diplomatic career.

Host country	List	Ambassador	Appointment	Embassy and website	Established (Embassy rank)
Afghanistan (Note: The Embassy of Spain in Kabul was closed and transferred operations to Doha, Qatar (residence), and Islamabad, Pakistan (visas and consular affairs) following the fall of Kabul to the Taliban.)	List	Francisco Javier Puig Saura (Note: In December 2025, the foreign minister appointed Francisco Javier Puig Saura as ambassador-at-large instead of resident ambassador.)	4 December 2025 (11 months ago)	Kabul	1950 (1968)
Albania	List	Gabriel Cremades Ventura	4 March 2025 (20 months ago)	Tirana	1929 (1986)
Algeria	List	Ramiro Fernández Bachiller	4 December 2025 (11 months ago)	Algiers	1493 (1962) (Note: Spain kept diplomatic relations with the Regency of Algiers (since Barbarossa). Modern relations established in 1962, with the first ambassador.)
Andorra	List	Carlos Pérez-Desoy Fages	2 February 2023 (3 years ago)	Andorra la Vella	1993
Angola	List	Miguel Utray Delgado	30 September 2026 (35 days ago)	Luanda	1977
Antigua and Barbuda	List	The ambassador to Jamaica		Kingston	1988 (1989)
Argentina	List	Joaquín María de Arístegui Laborde	29 October 2024 (2 years ago)	Buenos Aires	1848 (1917)
Armenia	List	The ambassador to Russia		Moscow	1992
Australia	List	Esther Monterrubio Villar	30 July 2024 (2 years ago)	Canberra	1967 (1968)
Austria	List	María Aurora Mejía Errasquín	13 March 2024 (2 years ago)	Vienna	1802 (Note: Spain has kept relations with the Holy Roman Empire since the 15th century. Since 1802, Spain has maintained an ambassador in Vienna with hardly any interruptions.)
Azerbaijan	List	The ambassador to Turkey		Ankara	1992 (Note: Ambassador with residence in Moscow until 1998, and in Ankara since then.)
Bahamas	List	The ambassador to Jamaica		Kingston	1976 (1978)
Bahrain	List	The ambassador to Kuwait		Kuwait City	1972
Bangladesh	List	Gabriel María Sistiaga Ochoa de Chinchetru	28 November 2023 (2 years ago)	Dhaka	1972 (Note: Ambassador with residence in New Delhi until 2008.)
Barbados	List	The ambassador to Trinidad and Tobago		Port of Spain	1986 (Note: Ambassador resident in Kingston until 2001 and in Port of Spain since 2007.)
Belarus	List	The ambassador to Russia		Moscow	1992
Belgium	List	José María Rodríguez Coso	3 June 2025 (17 months ago)	Brussels	1843 (1921)
Belize	List	The ambassador to Guatemala		Guatemala City	1989 (Note: From 1989 to 1993, the ambassador to the Organization of American States was accredited to Belize. Since 1993, the ambassador to Guatemala serves as such.)
Benin	List	The ambassador to Nigeria		Abuja	1966 (Note: The ambassador to Benin had its residence in Nigeria (1966–1968), Ivory Coast (1969–1989) and, since 1979, again in Nigeria.)
Bhutan	List	The ambassador to India		New Delhi	2011
Bolivia	List	Fernando García Casas	11 June 2024 (2 years ago)	La Paz	1847 (1949)
Bosnia and Herzegovina	List	María Milagrosa Molina Álvarez de Toledo	30 July 2024 (2 years ago)	Sarajevo	1993
Botswana	List	The ambassador to Namibia		Windhoek	1981 (1983) (Note: Ambassador resident in Harare, Zimbabwe until 1994.)
Brazil	List	Consuelo Femenía	30 June 2026 (4 months ago)	Brasilia	1834 (1933)
Brunei	List	The ambassador to Malaysia		Kuala Lumpur	1984
Bulgaria	List	Miguel Alonso Berrio	29 February 2024 (2 years ago)	Sofia	1910 (1977) (Note: Diplomatic relations since 1910, with a lapsus between the abolition of the Bulgarian monarchy and 1977.)
Burkina Faso	List	The ambassador to Mali		Bamako	1964
Burundi	List	The ambassador to Tanzania		Dar es Salaam	1969 (Note: Ambassador resident in Kinshasa until 1995.)
Cambodia	List	The ambassador to Thailand		Bangkok	1964
Cameroon	List	Juan Pedro Pérez-Gómez Delaunay	1 July 2025 (16 months ago)	Yaoundé	1961
Canada	List	María Luisa Benítez-Donoso Tarascón	28 October 2026 (7 days ago)	Ottawa	1953
Cape Verde	List	Juan Manglano Aboín	4 November 2026 (0 days ago)	Praia	1977
Central African Republic	List	The ambassador to Cameroon		Yaoundé	1964
Chad	List	The ambassador to Cameroon		Yaoundé	1975
Chile	List	Laura Oroz Ulibarri	22 July 2025 (15 months ago)	Santiago de Chile	1844 (1928)
China	List	Marta Betanzos Roig	17 January 2024 (2 years ago)	Beijing	1575 (1973) (Note: Spain has maintained diplomatic relations with Imperial China since the late 16th century. Current diplomatic mission to the People's Republic of China was established in 1973.)
Colombia	List	Santiago Jiménez Martín	7 January 2025 (21 months ago)	Bogotá	1881 (1950)
Comoros	List	The ambassador to South Africa		Pretoria	1983 (1984) (Note: Ambassador resident in Harare, Zimbabwe from 1984 to 1988, in Dar es Salaam, Tanzania from 1989 to 1997 and, since then, in Pretoria, South Africa.)
Democratic Republic of the Congo	List	María de los Ángeles García de Lara	30 June 2026 (4 months ago)	Kinshasa	1969
Republic of the Congo	List	The ambassador to the Democratic Republic of Congo		Kinshasa	1973
Cook Islands	List	The ambassador to New Zealand (Note: Ambassador residence relocated from Canberra to Wellington between 2008 and 2010.)		Wellington	1998
Costa Rica	List	Juan Ignacio Morro Villacián	26 August 2025 (14 months ago)	San José	1850 (1949)
Croatia	List	José Ramón García Hernández	7 May 2025 (17 months ago)	Zagreb	1992
Cuba	List	Francisco Javier Hergueta Garnica	23 March 2024 (2 years ago)	Havana	1902 (1926) (Note: The first ambassador was appointed in 1926, although it has not been a permanent position, having been a permanent since 1975.)
Cyprus	List	Mercedes Alonso Frayle	4 December 2025 (11 months ago)	Nicosia	1968 (Note: Ambassador resident in Beirut until 1979, and from 1998 to 2002, and in Damascus from 1979 to 1998.)
Czech Republic	List	María Pérez Sánchez-Laulhé	1 May 2024 (2 years ago)	Praga	1919 (1977) (Note: Czechoslovakia and Spain established diplomatic relations in 1919. The Second World War interrupted these relations, which were reestablished in 1977, with embassy status.)
Denmark	List	Salvador Rueda Rabanal	21 January 2025 (21 months ago)	Copenhagen	1516
Djibouti	List	The ambassador to Ethiopia		Addis Ababa	1982
Dominica	List	The ambassador to Jamaica		Kingston	1980 (1986)
Dominican Republic	List	Lorea Arribalzaga Ceballos	17 June 2025 (16 months ago)	Santo Domingo	1855 (1948)
East Timor (Timor-Leste)	List	The ambassador to Indonesia		Yakarta	2002
Ecuador	List	Enrique Erik Yturriaga Saldanha	31 January 2024 (2 years ago)	Quito	1840 (1951)
Egypt	List	Sergio Román Carranza Förster	23 September 2025 (13 months ago)	Cairo	1893 (1949) (Note: Peter Martyr d'Anghiera was sent in 1501 with the title of ambassador to the sultan of Egypt. However, modern diplomatic relations were established in 1893. The diplomatic mission has the rank of embassy since 1949.)
El Salvador	List	Sonia Isabel Álvarez Cibanal	30 July 2024 (2 years ago)	San Salvador	1865 (1950)
Equatorial Guinea	List	Francisco Javier Conde y Martínez de Irujo	28 November 2023 (2 years ago)	Malabo	1968
Eritrea	List	The ambassador to Sudan		Khartoum	1993
Estonia	List	Ángel María Vázquez Díaz de Tuesta	1 July 2025 (16 months ago)	Tallinn	1921 (1991) (Note: Ambassador resident in Helsinki until 2003.)
Eswatini	List	The ambassador to Mozambique		Maputo	1979
Ethiopia	List	Guillermo Antonio López Mac-Lellan	28 November 2023 (2 years ago)	Addis Ababa	1951 (1962)
Fiji	List	The ambassador to New Zealand		Wellington	1977
Finland	List	Manuel Montobbio de Balanzó	16 September 2025 (13 months ago)	Helsinki	1918 (1957)
France	List	Victorio Redondo Baldrich	29 September 2021 (5 years ago)	Paris	1475
Gabon	List	Rafael Chaves Beardo	1 July 2025 (16 months ago)	Libreville	1961 (1963)
The Gambia	List	The ambassador to Senegal		Dakar	1965
Georgia	List	The ambassador to Turkey		Ankara	1992 (Note: Ambassador resident in Moscow until 2007. Ambassador-at-large for Georgia and the Caucasus states from 2008 to 2011. Ambassador resident in Sofia between 2011 and 2012 and Ambassador resident in Ankara since 2013.)
Germany	List	Pascual Navarro Ríos	14 February 2024 (2 years ago)	Berlin	1871 (Note: Modern relations established after the German unification in 1871, however, Spain has maintained diplomatic relations with the Holy Roman Empire (1477–1806), the German independent states (such us Prussia, the German Confederation (1855–1866), the North German Confederation (1866–1869) and the following German states.)
Ghana	List	Ángel Lossada Torres-Quevedo	30 July 2024 (2 years ago)	Accra	1968
Greece	List	Jorge Domecq	15 October 2024 (2 years ago)	Athenas	1834 (1953)
Grenada	List	The ambassador to Trinidad and Tobago		Port of Spain	1986
Guatemala	List	María Clara Girbau Ronda	13 March 2024 (2 years ago)	Guatemala City	1863 (1954)
Guinea	List	Ángel Carrascal Gutiérrez	28 November 2023 (2 years ago)	Conakry	1965
Guinea-Bissau	List	Enrique Conde León	30 July 2024 (2 years ago)	Bissau	1975
Guyana	List	The ambassador to Trinidad and Tobago		Port of Spain	1986 (Note: Ambassador with residence in Caracas until 2007 and in Port of Spain since then.)
Haiti	List	Marco Antonio Peñín Toledano	30 January 2024 (2 years ago)	Port-au-Prince	1860 (1952)
Holy See (Vatican City)	List	Isabel Celaá	26 January 2022 (4 years ago)	Vatican City; Homepage	1480
Honduras	List	Guillermo Escribano Manzano	11 March 2026 (7 months ago)	Tegucigalpa	1894 (1951)
Hungary	List	Luis Ángel Redondo Gómez	23 September 2025 (13 months ago)	Budapest	1920 (1977) (Note: Hungary and Spain established diplomatic relations after Hungary's independence from Austria in 1920. Severed after World War II, they were reestablished in 1977 with embassy status.)
Iceland	List	The ambassador to Norway		Oslo	1949 (1966)
India	List	Alfredo Martínez Serrano	28 October 2026 (7 days ago)	New Delhi	1956
Indonesia	List	Bernardo de Sicart Escoda	15 July 2025 (15 months ago)	Yakarta	1958 (1967)
Iran	List	Antonio Sánchez-Benedito Gaspar	14 May 2024 (2 years ago)	Tehran	1842 (1957) (Note: Spain maintained occasional contacts with Safavid Iran and its successors, even exchanging ambassadors. In 1842, a treaty of friendship and trade was signed, officially inaugurating diplomatic relations. In 1957, they were elevated to the rank of ambassador.)
Iraq	List	Alicia Rico Pérez del Pulgar	30 July 2024 (2 years ago)	Baghdad	1946 (1953)
Ireland	List	María Teresa Lizaranzu Perinat	26 August 2025 (14 months ago)	Dublin	1924 (1950)
Israel (Note: Spain recalled its ambassador on 8 September 2025.)	List	Vacant since 11 March 2026; Francisca María Pedrós Carretero, chargé d'affaires a.i.		Tel Aviv	1986
Italy	List	Miguel Ángel Fernández-Palacios	11 October 2022 (4 years ago)	Rome	1865 (1887)
Ivory Coast	List	Guillermo Marín Gorbea	30 July 2024 (2 years ago)	Abidjan	1967 (Note: Non-resident ambassador (Liberia) until 1968.)
Jamaica	List	José María Fernández López de Turiso	5 November 2024 (23 months ago)	Kingston	1966 (1967) (Note: From 1967 to 1977, the ambassador in Haiti was dually accredited to Jamaica. Since 1977, there is an ambasador resident.)
Japan	List	Íñigo de Palacio España	28 January 2025 (21 months ago)	Tokyo	1590 (1952)
Jordan	List	José Luis Pardo Cuerdo	22 April 2026 (6 months ago)	Amman	1947 (1953)
Kazakhstan	List	Luis Francisco Martínez Montes	1 June 2024 (2 years ago)	Astana	1992 (Note: Ambassador resident in Moscow until 1999.)
Kenya	List	Jaime Alejandro Moreno Bau	8 July 2025 (15 months ago)	Nairobi	1965 (1967)
Kiribati	List	The ambassador to New Zealand		Wellington	2011
Kuwait	List	Manuel Hernández Gamallo	19 June 2024 (2 years ago)	Kuwait City	1964 (Note: Ambassador resident in Beirut from 1964 to 1972 and with residence in Kuwait City since 1972.)
Kyrgyzstan	List	The ambassador to Kazakhstan		Astana	1992
Laos	List	The ambassador to Thailand		Bangkok	1967
Latvia	List	Ricardo Díez-Hochleitner Cousteau	29 July 2026 (3 months ago)	Riga	1921 (1991)
Lebanon	List	Miguel María de Lucas González	22 April 2026 (6 months ago)	Beirut	1860s (1953)
Lesotho	List	The ambassador to South Africa		Pretoria	1976 (1982) (Note: Ambassador resident in Maputo, Mozambique from 1982 to 1995 and, since 1996, in Pretoria, South Africa.)
Liberia	List	The ambassador to Ivory Coast		Abidjan	1863 (1954) (Note: Spain established a resident embassy in 1954, but closed it due to the First Liberian Civil War. Following the restablishment of relations in 1997, the ambassador to Ivory Coast assumed responsibility for Liberia–Spain relations.)
Libya (Note: The Embassy of Spain in Tripoli suspended operations in 2014. Diplomatic personnel operate from the Embassy in Tunis, Tunisia.)	List	Javier Soria Quintana	1 May 2024 (2 years ago)	Tripoli	1784 (1962) (Note: Spain established a consulate in Tripoli after signing a Peace Treaty with the Regency of Tripoli.)
Liechtenstein	List	The ambassador to Switzerland		Berna	1991
Lithuania	List	José Fernando Fernández-Aguayo Muñoz	1 July 2025 (16 months ago)	Vilnius	1922 (1991)
Luxembourg (Note: The head of Mission was resident in Amsterdam from 1891 to 1922, and in Brussels until 1970.)	List	María Nieves Blanco Díaz	1 July 2025 (16 months ago)	Luxembourg	1891 (1955)
Madagascar	List	The ambassador to South Africa		Pretoria	1966 (Note: Ambassador resident in Addis Ababa, Ethiopia from 1966 to 1968, in Nairobi, Kenia from 1969 to 1994, and in Pretoria, South Africa since 1994.)
Malawi	List	The ambassador to Zimbabwe		Harare	1972
Malaysia	List	Sergio Farré Salvá	30 June 2026 (4 months ago)	Kuala Lumpur	1967
Maldives	List	The ambassador to India		New Delhi	1979 (1983)
Mali	List	Antonio Guillén Hidalgo	28 November 2023 (2 years ago)	Bamako	1964
Malta	List	Miriam Álvarez de la Rosa Rodríguez	27 December 2025 (10 months ago)	Valletta	1969
Sovereign Military Order of Malta	List	The ambassador to the Holy See		Vatican City; Homepage	1483 (1972)
Marshall Islands	List	The ambassador to the Philippines		Manila	1992
Mauritania	List	Pablo Barbará Gómez	4 March 2025 (20 months ago)	Nouakchott	1961 (1962)
Mauritius	List	The ambassador to South Africa		Pretoria	1979 (1982) (Note: Ambassador resident in Dar es Salaam, Tanzania from 1982 to 1997 and, since then, in Pretoria, South Africa.)
Mexico	List	Juan Duarte Cuadrado	31 August 2022 (4 years ago)	Mexico City	1836 (1860)
Micronesia	List	The ambassador to the Philippines		Manila	1992
Moldova	List	The ambassador to the Romania		Bucarest	1993
Monaco	List	The ambassador to France		Paris	1876 (2013)
Mongolia	List	The ambassador to China		Beijing	1977 (Note: Ambassador resident in Moscow until 1995 and in Beijing since then.)
Montenegro	List	The ambassador to Serbia		Belgrade	2006
Morocco	List	Enrique Ojeda Vila	24 January 2024 (2 years ago)	Rabat	1578 (1956)
Mozambique	List	Teresa Orjales Vidal	28 November 2023 (2 years ago)	Maputo	1977
Myanmar	List	The ambassador to Thailand		Bangkok	1967
Namibia	List	Francisco Javier Pagalday Gastelurrutia	15 July 2025 (15 months ago)	Windhoek	1990
Nauru	List	The ambassador to Australia		Canberra	1995 (1997)
Nepal	List	The ambassador to India		New Delhi	1968
Netherlands	List	Cecilia Robles Cartes	30 June 2026 (4 months ago)	The Hague	1649
New Zealand	List	Luis Alfonso Sánchez-Vellisco	15 July 2025 (15 months ago)	Wellington	1969
Nicaragua	List	Vacant since 4 March 2026; Alejandro Robles Monsalve, chargé d'affaires a.i.		Managua	1850 (1950)
Niger	List	Gloria Mínguez Ropiñón	28 November 2023 (2 years ago)	Niamey	1965 (Note: Ambassador resident in Monrovia from 1965 to 1969 and in Abidjan from 1969 to 2007.)
Nigeria	List	Félix Costales Artieda	27 May 2025 (17 months ago)	Abuja	1961
North Korea	List	The ambassador to South Korea		Seoul	2001
North Macedonia	List	Rafael Soriano Ortiz	30 July 2024 (2 years ago)	Skopje	1994
Norway	List	Alejandra del Río Novo	3 July 2024 (2 years ago)	Oslo	1905 (1958) (Note: Ambassador resident in Stockholm from 1902 to 1907 and in Copenhagen from 1907 to 1919.)
Oman	List	Francisco Javier de Istúriz Simonet	23 April 2024 (2 years ago)	Muscat	1972
Pakistan	List	Carlos Aragón Gil de la Serna	27 December 2025 (10 months ago)	Islamabad	1951
Palau	List	The ambassador to the Philippines		Manila	1997
Palestine	Spain recognized the State of Palestine in May 2024, however, no ambassador has been appointed yet.				
Panama	List	Moisés Morera Martín	29 July 2026 (3 months ago)	Panama City	1880s (1951)
Papua New Guinea	List	The ambassador to Australia		Canberra	1979
Paraguay	List	Javier Parrondo Babarro	10 December 2024 (22 months ago)	Asunción	1880 (1949)
Peru	List	Alejandro Abellán García de Diego	20 March 2024 (2 years ago)	Lima; Homepage	1879 (1939)
Philippines	List	Xavier Martí Martí	30 September 2026 (35 days ago)	Manila	1951
Poland	List	Victoria Ortega Gutiérrez.	17 December 2025 (10 months ago)	Warsaw	1519
Portugal	List	Juan Fernández Trigo	28 December 2023 (2 years ago)	Lisbon	1474 (1479)
Qatar	List	Álvaro Renedo Zalba	4 March 2025 (20 months ago)	Doha	1973 (Note: Ambassador resident in Kuwait between 1973 and 1978 and in Abu Dhabi until 2008. Since then, the ambassador resides in the host country.)
Romania	List	José Antonio Hernández Pérez-Solórzano	7 September 2022 (4 years ago)	Bucarest	1881 (1977) (Note: Relations were interrupted in 1947, following the abdication of King Michael I, and re-established in 1977, with the status of embassy.)
Russia	List	Ricardo Martínez Vázquez	3 July 2024 (2 years ago)	Moscow; Homepage	1718 (Note: Spain and Russia have maintained stable diplomatic relations since the 18th century. After the rupture during dictatorship of Francisco Franco, they were reestablished in 1977.)
Rwanda	List	The ambassador to Tanzania		Dar es Salaam	1967
Saint Kitts and Nevis	List	The ambassador to Jamaica		Kingston	1987
Saint Lucia	List	The ambassador to Trinidad and Tobago		Port of Spain	1986
Saint Vincent and the Grenadines	List	The ambassador to Trinidad and Tobago		Port of Spain	1986
Samoa	List	The ambassador to New Zealand		Wellington	1980 (1992)
San Marino	List	The ambassador to Italy		Rome; Homepage	1978 (1993)
São Tomé and Príncipe	List	The ambassador to Gabon		Libreville	1982 (Note: Resident in Luanda until 1995.)
Saudi Arabia	List	Javier María Carbajosa Sánchez	4 March 2025 (20 months ago)	Riyadh	1948 (1953) (Note: In 1953, the Ambassador to Egypt was dual accredited to Saudi Arabia and, since 1956, there is an independent Embassy in Riyadh.)
Senegal	List	María Dolores Ríos Peset	13 March 2024 (2 years ago)	Dakar	1961
Serbia	List	Ander Ruiz de Gopegui Aramburu	29 July 2026 (3 months ago)	Belgrade	1910 (1977)
Seychelles	List	The ambassador to Ethiopia		Addis Ababa	1978
Sierra Leone	List	The ambassador to Guinea		Conakry	1964
Singapore	List	Álvaro de la Riva Guzmán de Frutos	14 January 2026 (9 months ago)	Singapore	1968
Slovakia	List	Sofía Ruiz del Árbol Moro	17 June 2025 (16 months ago)	Bratislava	1993
Slovenia	List	Javier Herrera García-Canturri	3 July 2024 (2 years ago)	Ljubljana	1992 (Note: Ambassador resident in Vienna until 1998.)
Solomon Islands	List	The ambassador to Australia		Canberra	1981
Somalia	List	The ambassador to Kenya		Nairobi	1968
South Africa	List	José Manuel Pascual García	16 April 2025 (18 months ago)	Pretoria	1951 (1960)
South Korea	List	Julio Herraiz España	1 July 2025 (16 months ago)	Seoul	1950 (1962)
South Sudan	List	The ambassador to Sudan		Khartoum	2012
Sri Lanka	List	The ambassador to India		New Delhi	1955
Sudan (Note: Spain closed its embassy in April 2023 and transferred operations to Cairo, Egypt.)	List	Daniel Losada Millar	25 February 2026 (8 months ago)	Khartoum	1963 (1967)
Suriname	List	The ambassador to Trinidad and Tobago		Port of Spain	1976 (1986) (Note: Ambassador resident in Caracas until 2010 and in Port of Spain since then.)
Sweden	List	Luis Manuel Cuesta Civís	27 August 2024 (2 years ago)	Stockholm	1633
Switzerland	List	Enrique Ignacio Mora Benavente	4 December 2025 (11 months ago)	Berna	1513
Syria (Note: Spain closed it embassy in 2012. In December 2024, the government appointed and special envoy to gradually re-establish diplomatic relations.)	List	Antonio González-Zavala Peña	24 December 2024 (22 months ago)	Damascus	1948 (1956)
Taiwan	Spain maintained relations with the Republic of China until 1973. Since then, diplomatic relations have been carried out by the Taipei Consular Section of the Consulate General in Manila.				
Tajikistan	List	The ambassador to Kazakhstan		Astana	1992
Tanzania	List	Paloma Serra Robles	1 July 2025 (16 months ago)	Dar es Salaam	1967
Thailand	List	Manuel Nuche Bascón	30 June 2026 (4 months ago)	Bangkok	1870 (1961)
Togo	List	The ambassador to Ghana		Accra	1965
Tonga	List	The ambassador to New Zealand		Wellington	1979 (1981)
Trinidad and Tobago	List	María Cristina Pérez Gutiérrez	30 July 2024 (2 years ago)	Port of Spain	1967 (Note: The ambassador in Caracas served as such until 2006.)
Tunisia	List	Isidro Antonio González Afonso	4 December 2025 (11 months ago)	Tunisia	1475
Turkey	List	Cristina Latorre Sancho	27 March 2024 (2 years ago)	Ankara	1782 (1951) (Note: Spain and Turkey —the Ottoman Empire— has kept diplomatic relations since the 16th century. The first Peace, Friendship and Trade treaty was signed in 1782 and, in 1951, modern relations were established.)
Turkmenistan	List	The ambassador to Russia		Moscow	1992
Tuvalu	List	The ambassador to Australia		Canberra	1992 (2002)
Uganda	List	The ambassador to Kenya		Nairobi	1969
Ukraine	List	Adela Díaz Bernárdez	29 July 2026 (3 months ago)	Kyiv	1992
United Arab Emirates	List	Emilio Pin Godos	12 February 2025 (20 months ago)	Abu Dhabi	1972 (Note: Ambassador resident in Kuwait until 1973.)
United Kingdom	List	Emma Aparici Vázquez de Parga	4 December 2025 (11 months ago)	London; Homepage	1494
United States	List	Ángeles Moreno Bau	17 January 2024 (2 years ago)	Washington, D.C. Homepage	1778 (1926)
Uruguay	List	Javier Salido Ortiz	21 January 2025 (21 months ago)	Montevideo	1845 (1953)
Uzbekistan	List	The ambassador to Russia		Moscow	1992 (Note: Modern relations were established in 1992. Historic relations dates back to the 15th century, when Ruy González de Clavijo was sent as ambassador of Castile to court of Timur.)
Vanuatu	List	The ambassador to Australia		Camberra	1981 (1992)
Venezuela	List	Álvaro Albacete Perea	3 December 2024 (23 months ago)	Caracas	1845 (1949)
Vietnam	List	Carmen Cano de Lasala	28 November 2023 (2 years ago)	Hanoi	1964 (Note: Date of creation of the mission in one of the sides before the unification of the country.)
Yemen	List	Spain closed its embassy in Yemen in 2012, transferring its operations to the European Union delegation and, in 2015, it halted all operations indefinitely.			1968
Zambia	List	María Lourdes Sangróniz Guerricagoitia	1 July 2025 (16 months ago)	Harare	1969
Zimbabwe	List	María Lourdes Sangróniz Guerricagoitia	1 July 2025 (16 months ago)	Harare	1980
Abkhazia	The Republic of Abkhazia is not recognized by the United Nations or by Spain.				
Kosovo	The Republic of Kosovo is not recognized by the United Nations or by Spain.				
Northern Cyprus	The Turkish Republic of Northern Cyprus is not recognized by the United Nations or by Spain.				
Sahrawi Arab Democratic Republic	The Sahrawi Arab Democratic Republic is not recognized by the United Nations or by Spain.				
South Ossetia	The Republic of South Ossetia is not recognized by the United Nations or by Spain.				

== Ambassadors to international organizations ==
Political appointees, that is, they are not part of the diplomatic career.

=== Ambassadors to the United Nations ===
Host organization	List	Ambassador	Appointment	Representation and website	Established
United Nations	List	Héctor Gómez Hernández	5 December 2023 (2 years ago)	New York	1956
United Nations (Deputy)	List	Ana Jiménez de la Hoz	6 April 2022 (4 years ago)	New York	
United Nations Office at Geneva	List	Marcos Gómez Martínez	3 July 2024 (2 years ago)	Geneva	1955
United Nations Office at Geneva (Deputy)	List	Clara Cabrera Brasero	12 April 2023 (3 years ago)	Geneva	
United Nations Office at Geneva (Deputy - Disarmament)	List	María Bassols Delgado	18 April 2024 (2 years ago)	Geneva	
United Nations Office at Geneva (Deputy - Trade)	List	María Pilar Morán Reyero	11 April 2025 (18 months ago)	Geneva	
United Nations International Organizations at Rome (U.N. Agencies for Food and Agriculture)	List	The ambassador to Italy		Rome	1951
United Nations Educational, Scientific and Cultural Organization	List	Miquel Iceta	5 December 2023 (2 years ago)	Paris	1954
United Nations Office at Vienna	List	María Sebastián de Erice	30 July 2024 (2 years ago)	Vienna	1980
United Nations Office at Nairobi	List	The ambassador to Kenya		Nairobi	

=== Ambassadors to European organizations ===
Host organization	List	Ambassador	Appointment	Representation and website	Established
European Union	List	Marcos Alonso Alonso	21 July 2021 (5 years ago)	Brussels	1960
European Union (Deputy)	List	Oriol Escalas Nolla	3 July 2024 (2 years ago)	Brussels	1979
Political and Security Committee	List	Guillermo Ardizone García	30 July 2024 (2 years ago)	Brussels	2000
Council of Europe	List	Rosa Velázquez Álvarez	26 August 2025 (14 months ago)	Strasbourg	1977

=== Other international organizations ===
Current Spanish ambassadors to other international organizations:

Host organization	List	Ambassador	Appointment	Representation and website	Established
African Union	List	The ambassador to Ethiopia		Addis Ababa	
Community of Portuguese Language Countries	List	The ambassador to Portugal		Lisboa	2021
International Atomic Energy Agency	List	The ambassador to the UN in Vienna		Vienna	1957 (Note: Until 1980, the ambassador to Austria served as permanent representative to the IAEA.)
North Atlantic Treaty Organization	List	Federico Torres Muro	11 October 2022 (4 years ago)	Brussels	1982
Organisation for Economic Co-operation and Development	List	Ximo Puig	21 February 2024 (2 years ago)	Paris	1955
Organization for the Prohibition of Chemical Weapons	List	The ambassador to the Netherlands		The Hague	1997
Organization for Security and Co-operation in Europe	List	Cristóbal Ramón Valdés y Valentín-Gamazo	25 August 2021 (5 years ago)	Vienna	1995
Organization of American States	List	Carmen Montón Giménez	10 March 2020 (6 years ago)	Washington, D.C.	1972
Inter-American Defense Board	List	Carmen Montón Giménez	10 March 2020 (6 years ago)	Washington, D.C.	1972
Pan American Health Organization	List	Carmen Montón Giménez	10 March 2020 (6 years ago)	Washington, D.C.	1980
International Seabed Authority	List	The ambassador to Jamaica		Kingston	1997

== Ambassadors-at-large ==
Current ambassadors-at-large from Spain, known in Spanish as Embajadores en Misión Especial (lit. 'Ambassadors in Special Mission' or Special Ambassadors), are the following:

Portfolio	Ambassador	Appointment	Established
Peacekeeping Operations	María Luisa Huidobro Martín-Laborda	12 November 2024 (23 months ago)	1993
Mediterranean Affairs	Juan Lugo Sanchiz	25 June 2025 (16 months ago)	1997
Human Rights, Democracy and Rule of Law	Vacant since 27 December 2025		1998
Ibero-American Cooperation	Jorge Mijangos Blanco	3 September 2025 (14 months ago)	2000
Afghanistan	Francisco Javier Puig Saura	4 December 2025 (11 months ago)	2004
Migration Affairs	María del Pilar Méndez Jiménez	21 February 2024 (2 years ago)	2009
Global Health	Mencía de Silos Manso de Zúñiga Spottorno	1 October 2025 (13 months ago)	2011
Sahel	Diego Nuño García	11 March 2026 (7 months ago)	2013
Cross-border Cooperation	Borja Montesino Martínez del Cerro	26 August 2025 (14 months ago)	2021
Femenist Foreign Policy	Ana María Alonso Giganto	12 June 2024 (2 years ago)	2021
Indo-Pacific	María Elena Gómez Castro	18 September 2024 (2 years ago)	2022
Rights of Persons with Disabilities	Jesús Ángel Celada Pérez	28 May 2025 (17 months ago)	2022
Development Financing	Cristina Díaz Fernández-Gil	24 September 2025 (13 months ago)	2024
LGTBI+ rights	Jorge Antonio Noval Álvarez	2 July 2025 (16 months ago)	2025
Great Lakes and the Horn of Africa	José Pascual Marco Martínez	4 December 2025 (11 months ago)	2025

== Other officials with the rank of ambassador ==
Position	Ambassador	Appointed	Date	Law granting the rank
Introducer of Ambassadors	Adrián Martín Couce	30 July 2024 (2 years ago)	1626	Article 23(1), Royal Decree 1184/2024.
Under-Secretary of Foreign Affairs	Sergio Cuesta Francisco	30 September 2026 (35 days ago)	1834	Article 9, Decree of 15 July 1955
Director of the Diplomatic School	Cecilia Robles Cartes	4 December 2024 (23 months ago)	1942	Article 19(4), Royal Decree 1184/2024

== See also ==
- List of diplomatic missions of Spain
- List of foreign ministers of Spain
- Spanish Foreign Service
- Secretary of State for Foreign Affairs (Spain)
- Secretary of State for the European Union
- Secretary of State for International Cooperation
- Secretary of State for Ibero-America
