= List of ambassadors of Spain to Kazakhstan =

Ambassador of Spain to Kazakhstan
- Coat of arms of Spain
- Incumbent; Luis Francisco Martínez Montes since 11 June 2024
- Ministry of Foreign Affairs; Secretariat of State for Foreign Affairs
- Style: The Most Excellent
- Residence: Astana
- Nominator: The Foreign Minister
- Appointer: The Monarch
- Term length: At the government's pleasure
- Inaugural holder: Eugenio Bregolat Obiols
- Formation: 1992
- Website: Mission of Spain to Kazakhstan

The ambassador of Spain to Kazakhstan is the official representative of the Kingdom of Spain to the Republic of Kazakhstan. It is also accredited to the Kyrgyz Republic and the Republic of Tajikistan.

Spain and Kazakhstan established diplomatic relations on 11 February 1992 with a joint statement signed in Moscow, Russia, where the ambassador resided until 1999. This last year, Spain opened a resident embassy in Almaty and, in 2002, the embassy moved to the capital, Astana.

== Jurisdiction ==
- Kazakhstan: Diplomatic relations between both countries are channeled through their respective embassies. In the case of the Spanish one, it is located in Astana and the consular assistance is provided by the Consular Section of the Embassy. It also exists an Honorary Consulate in Almaty.

Also, the ambassador in Astana is dually accredited to two more countries:

- Kyrgyzstan: Spain and Kyrgistan established diplomatic relations on 3 April 1992. Relations have been cordial, with occasional use by Spanish troops of the Manas Military Base. Consular assistance is provided by the Consular Section of the Embassy in Astana.
- Tajikistan: Diplomatic relations were established on 4 August 1992. Although the Consular Section of the Embassy in Astana provides consular services, it also has an Honorary Consulate in Dushanbe.

Spain also has a Trade Office in the Embassy of Kazakhstan and a Interior Office (for security affairs) in the Embassy of Turkey, with jurisdiction over all three countries.

== List of ambassadors ==
Ambassador		Term	Nominated by	Appointed by	Accredited to
1	Eugenio Bregolat (Note: Resident in Moscow)	12 October 1992 – 22 November 1996 (4 years, 41 days)	Javier Solana	Juan Carlos I	Nursultan Nazarbayev
2	José Antonio de Yturriaga	22 February 1997 – 1 May 1999 (2 years, 68 days)	Abel Matutes	Juan Carlos I	Nursultan Nazarbayev
3	Francisco Pascual de la Parte (Note: Accredited to Kyrgyzstan and Tajikistan.)	1 May 1999 – 2 April 2005 (5 years, 336 days)	Josep Piqué	Juan Carlos I	Nursultan Nazarbayev
4	Santiago Chamorro; Marquess of González-Tablas	2 April 2005 – 9 September 2008 (3 years, 160 days)	Miguel Ángel Moratinos	Juan Carlos I	Nursultan Nazarbayev
5	Alberto Antón Cortés	9 September 2008 – 12 May 2012 (3 years, 246 days)	Miguel Ángel Moratinos	Juan Carlos I	Nursultan Nazarbayev
6	Manuel Larrotcha Parada	12 May 2012 – 30 May 2015 (3 years, 18 days)	José Manuel García-Margallo	Juan Carlos I	Nursultan Nazarbayev
7	Pedro José Sanz Serrano	30 May 2015 – 21 July 2018 (3 years, 52 days)	José Manuel García-Margallo	Felipe VI	Nursultan Nazarbayev
8	David Arturo Carriedo Tomás	28 July 2018 – 4 August 2021 (3 years, 7 days)	Josep Borrell	Felipe VI	Nursultan Nazarbayev
9	Jorge Urbiola López de Montenegro	4 August 2021 – 12 June 2024 (2 years, 313 days)	José Manuel Albares	Felipe VI	Kassym-Jomart Tokayev
10	Luis Francisco Martínez Montes	12 June 2024 – present (2 years, 137 days)	José Manuel Albares	Felipe VI	Kassym-Jomart Tokayev

== See also ==
- Kazakhstan–Spain relations
