= List of ambassadors of Spain to Kenya =

Ambassador of Spain to Kenya
- Coat of arms of Spain
- Incumbent; Jaime Alejandro Moreno Bau since July 9, 2025
- Ministry of Foreign Affairs; Secretariat of State for Foreign Affairs; Directorate-General for Africa
- Style: The Most Excellent
- Residence: Nairobi
- Nominator: The Foreign Minister
- Appointer: The Monarch
- Term length: At the government's pleasure
- Inaugural holder: Juan Luis Pan de Soraluce y Olmos
- Formation: 1968
- Website: Mission of Spain to Kenya

The ambassador of Spain to Kenya is the official representative of the Kingdom of Spain to the Republic of Kenya. It also represents Spain to the Federal Republic of Somalia and the Republic of Uganda. In addition, the embassy is accredited as the Permanent Representation of Spain to the United Nations Office at Nairobi.

After the establishment of diplomatic relations between both countries in 1965, in August 1967 the Spanish government created an Embassy in Nairobi and appointed the first ambassador in September 1968.

== Jurisdiction ==
- Kenya: Kenya is the embassy's main jurisdiction, representing Spain before Kenyan authorities and giving consular services through the hole country. In addition, there is an honorary consulate in Mombasa.
- Somalia: Somalia and Spain established diplomatic relations in 1968, creating and embassy in Mogadishu. The ambassador, however, resides in Nairobi and is dually accredited. Consular services are provided by the Honorary Consulate of Spain in Mogadishu.
- Uganda: In 1969, Spain established diplomatic relations with Uganda, creating a non-resident embassy in Kampala. Consular services are provided by the Honorary Consulate of Spain in Kampala.
- United Nations: Nairobi hosts one of the four major headquarters of the United Nations, the United Nations Office at Nairobi. Both the ambassador and the deputy ambassador act as permanent and deputy permanent representatives to the United Nations Environment Programme (UNEP) and the United Nations Human Settlements Programme (UN-Habitat).

In the past, this embassy was also accredited to the Republic of Madagascar (1968–1990), the Republic of Seychelles (1993–2003) and the State of Eritrea (2003–2006).

== List of ambassadors ==
Ambassador		Term	Nominated by	Appointed by	Accredited to
1	Juan Luis Pan de Soraluce y Olmos (Note: Accredited to Uganda and Madagascar.); Count consort of San Román	19 September 1968 – 11 January 1972 (3 years, 114 days)	Fernando María Castiella	Francisco Franco	Jomo Kenyatta
2	Miguel Ángel Velarde y Ruiz de Cenzano	11 January 1972 – 19 February 1977 (5 years, 39 days)	Gregorio López-Bravo	Francisco Franco	Jomo Kenyatta
3	Joaquín Castillo Moreno; Marquess of Castro Torres	5 May 1977 – 11 March 1981 (3 years, 310 days)	The Marquess of Oreja	Juan Carlos I	Jomo Kenyatta
4	José García Bañón	11 March 1981 – 20 September 1985 (4 years, 193 days)	José Pedro Pérez-Llorca	Juan Carlos I	Daniel arap Moi
5	Mariano Baselga Mantecón	20 September 1985 – 25 September 1987 (2 years, 5 days)	Francisco Fernández Ordóñez	Juan Carlos I	Daniel arap Moi
6	Carlos Abella y Ramallo (Note: Accredited to Uganda, Madagascar and Somalia.)	25 September 1987 – 30 January 1991 (3 years, 127 days)	Francisco Fernández Ordóñez	Juan Carlos I	Daniel arap Moi
7	Luis Calvo Merino (Note: Accredited to Uganda and Seychelles.)	7 May 1991 – 3 May 1994 (2 years, 361 days)	Francisco Fernández Ordóñez	Juan Carlos I	Daniel arap Moi
8	Fermín Prieto-Castro Roumier	4 June 1994 – 4 July 1998 (4 years, 30 days)	Javier Solana	Juan Carlos I	Daniel arap Moi
9	Luis Francisco García Cerezo	4 July 1998 – 30 November 2002 (4 years, 149 days)	Abel Matutes	Juan Carlos I	Daniel arap Moi
10	Aníbal Julio Jiménez y Abascal (Note: Accredited to Uganda and Eritrea.)	30 November 2002 – 21 January 2006 (3 years, 52 days)	Ana Palacio	Juan Carlos I	Daniel arap Moi
11	Nicolás Martín Cinto (Note: Accredited to Uganda)	21 January 2006 – 16 November 2010 (4 years, 299 days)	Miguel Ángel Moratinos	Juan Carlos I	Mwai Kibaki
12	Javier Herrera García-Canturri (Note: Accredited to Uganda and Somalia.)	16 November 2010 – 7 June 2014 (3 years, 203 days)	Trinidad Jiménez	Juan Carlos I	Mwai Kibaki
13	José Javier Nagore San Martín	7 June 2014 – 11 March 2017 (2 years, 277 days)	José Manuel García-Margallo	Juan Carlos I	Uhuru Kenyatta
14	Javier García de Viedma	1 April 2017 – 25 August 2021 (3 years, 114 days)	Alfonso Dastis	Felipe VI	William Ruto
15	Cristina Díaz Fernández-Gil	25 August 2021 – 25 August 2021 (3 years, 114 days)	José Manuel Albares	Felipe VI	William Ruto
16	Jaime Alejandro Moreno Bau	9 July 2025 – present	José Manuel Albares	Felipe VI	William Ruto
