= List of ambassadors of Spain to Bangladesh =

Ambassador of Spain to Bangladesh
- Coat of arms of Spain
- Incumbent; Gabriel María Sistiaga Ochoa de Chinchetru since 29 November 2023
- Ministry of Foreign Affairs; Secretariat of State for Foreign Affairs
- Style: The Most Excellent
- Residence: Dhaka
- Nominator: The Foreign Minister
- Appointer: The Monarch
- Term length: At the government's pleasure
- Inaugural holder: Guillermo Nadal Blanes
- Formation: 1972
- Website: Mission of Spain to Bangladesh

The ambassador of Spain to Bangladesh is the official representative of the Kingdom of Spain to the People's Republic of Bangladesh.

Following the proclamation of Bangladeshi Independence, Spain recognized the new state and established diplomatic relations with it, although the ambassador resided in New Delhi, India. In October 2005, the Council of Ministers approved the Plan Asia 2005–2008 which provided for the creation of an embassy in the Bangladeshi capital and designated the Asian country as a "preferred country" for Spanish Cooperation. In compliance with these objectives, in October 2007 the Spanish government created a resident embassy in Dhaka, which was opened the following year.

== List of ambassadors ==
Name		Term	Nominated by	Appointed by	Accredited to
1	Guillermo Nadal Blanes (Note: Resident in New Delhi, India.)	13 May 1972 – 9 September 1975 (3 years, 119 days)	Gregorio López-Bravo	Francisco Franco	Abu Sayeed Chowdhury
2	Leopoldo Martínez de Campos y Muñoz, Duke of the Tower	20 April 1976 – 30 October 1980 (4 years, 193 days)	The Count of Motrico	Francisco Franco	Abu Sadat Mohammad Sayem
3	Enrique Mahou Stauffer	6 March 1982 – 11 June 1986 (4 years, 97 days)	José Pedro Pérez-Llorca	Juan Carlos I	A. F. M. Ahsanuddin Chowdhury
4	Carlos Fernández Espeso	30 June 1987 – 14 July 1990 (3 years, 14 days)	Francisco Fernández Ordóñez	Juan Carlos I	Hussain Muhammad Ershad
5	Santiago Salas Collantes	15 May 1991 – 24 December 1994 (3 years, 223 days)	Francisco Fernández Ordóñez	Juan Carlos I	Shahabuddin Ahmed
6	Álvaro de Castilla y Bermúdez-Cañete	10 July 1995 – 19 January 1998† (2 years, 193 days)	Javier Solana	Juan Carlos I	Abdur Rahman Biswas
7	Alberto Escudero Claramunt	9 January 1999 – 28 December 2002 (3 years, 353 days)	Abel Matutes	Juan Carlos I	Shahabuddin Ahmed
8	Rafael Conde de Saro	30 July 2003 – 2 June 2007 (3 years, 307 days)	Ana Palacio	Juan Carlos I	Iajuddin Ahmed
9	Arturo Manuel Pérez	23 February 2008 – 23 July 2011 (3 years, 150 days)	Miguel Ángel Moratinos	Juan Carlos I	Iajuddin Ahmed
10	Luis Tejada Chacón	23 July 2011 – 24 March 2015 (3 years, 244 days)	Trinidad Jiménez	Juan Carlos I	Zillur Rahman
11	Eduardo de Laiglesia y del Rosal	24 March 2015 – 19 November 2016 (1 year, 240 days)	José Manuel García-Margallo	Felipe VI	Mohammad Abdul Hamid
12	Álvaro de Salas Giménez de Azcárate	4 March 2017 – 8 July 2020 (3 years, 126 days)	Alfonso Dastis	Felipe VI	Mohammad Abdul Hamid
13	Francisco de Asís Benítez Salas	8 July 2020 – 29 November 2023 (3 years, 144 days)	Arancha González Laya	Felipe VI	Mohammad Abdul Hamid
14	Gabriel María Sistiaga Ochoa de Chinchetru	29 November 2023 – present (2 years, 282 days)	José Manuel Albares	Felipe VI	Mohammed Shahabuddin

== See also ==
- Bangladesh–Spain relations
