= List of ambassadors of Spain to Afghanistan =

Ambassador of Spain to Afghanistan
- Coat of arms of Spain
- Incumbent; José Pascual Marco Martínez since 4 December 2025
- Ministry of Foreign Affairs; Secretariat of State for Foreign Affairs
- Style: The Most Excellent
- Residence: Doha, Qatar (since 2021)
- Nominator: The Foreign Minister
- Appointer: The Monarch
- Term length: At the government's pleasure
- Inaugural holder: Juan Manuel Aristegui y Vidaurre
- Formation: 1968
- Website: Mission of Spain to Afghanistan

The ambassador of Spain to Afghanistan is the official representative of the Kingdom of Spain to the Islamic Emirate of Afghanistan.

Afghanistan and Spain established diplomatic relations in 1950. That same year, Spain appointed Juan Manuel Aristegui y Vidaurre as Envoy Extraordinary and Minister Plenipotentiary. After the appointment in 1958 of Emilio García Gómez, ambassador to Iraq, the non-resident embassy followed him in his other assignments —Lebanon and Turkey—, serving as envoy and ambasador to Afghanistan for almost 12 years. In 1968, the Diplomatic Representation was elevated to the rank of Embassy. From 1974 to 1979, the ambassador to Turkey was dually accredited to Afghanistan.

Both countries broke off diplomatic relations after the establishment of the Democratic Republic of Afghanistan. They were reestablished in 2002, with the appointment of Antonio Segura Morís as ambassador, resident in Islamabad. Between 2004 and 2006, two other ambassadors served in the area, one for the International Security Assistance Force (ISAF) and another as ambassador-at-large for the Reconstruction and Political Stability of Afghanistan.

In December 2015, the Spanish embassy was the target of a Taliban terrorist attack that left nine people dead, including four Afghan and two Spanish police officers.

During the 2021 Taliban offensive, ambassador Gabriel Ferrán Carrión, son of former diplomat Gabriel Ferrán de Alfaro, stayed in the Afghan capital despite having been dismissed ten days before the fall of the Afghan government; he decided to stay until the evacuation was completed and no Spaniards remained in the country. For his actions, he was later rewarded with the Cross of the Order of Police Merit, with White Decoration. Following the fall of Kabul to the Taliban in 2021, the Foreign Ministry closed the Embassy of Spain in Kabul and transferred operations to Doha, Qatar (ambassador's residence), and Islamabad, Pakistan (visas and consular affairs). In December 2025, an ambassador-at-large for Afghanistan was appointed to replace the ordinary ambassador.

== List of envoys and ambassadors ==
Ambassador		Term	Nominated by	Appointed by	Accredited to
Envoy Extraordinary and Minister Plenipotentiary
-	Juan Manuel Aristegui y Vidaurre	21 May 1950 – 10 January 1953 (2 years, 234 days)	Alberto Martín-Artajo	Francisco Franco	Mohammad Zahir Shah
-	Pedro E. Schwartz y Díaz-Flores (Note: Resident in Baghdad.)	23 January 1953 – 1 November 1956 (3 years, 283 days)	Alberto Martín-Artajo	Francisco Franco	Mohammad Zahir Shah
-	José Ricardo Gómez-Acebo y Vázquez	20 January 1957 – 25 June 1958 (1 year, 156 days)	Alberto Martín-Artajo	Francisco Franco	Mohammad Zahir Shah
-	Emilio García Gómez (Note: Resident in Baghdad unil 1960 and in Beirut from 1960 to 1962 and in Ankara between 1962 and 1969.); Count of Alixares	25 June 1958 – 13 January 1968 (9 years, 202 days)	Fernando María Castiella	Francisco Franco	Mohammad Zahir Shah
Ambassador Extraordinary and Plenipotentiary
1	Emilio García Gómez; Count of Alixares	13 January 1968 – 17 November 1969 (1 year, 308 days)	Fernando María Castiella	Francisco Franco	Mohammad Zahir Shah
2	Luis García de Llera y Rodríguez (Note: Resident in Ankara.)	4 April 1970 – 24 March 1973 (2 years, 354 days)	Gregorio López-Bravo	Francisco Franco	Mohammad Zahir Shah
3	Carmelo Matesanz Rojo (Note: Resident in Tehran.)	4 April 1974 – 25 October 1975 (1 year, 204 days)	Pedro Cortina Mauri	Francisco Franco	Mohammad Daoud Khan
4	Aurelio Valls Carreras	25 October 1975 – 28 December 1979 (4 years, 64 days)	León Herrera Esteban (acting)	Francisco Franco	Mohammad Daoud Khan
No diplomatic relations with the Democratic Republic of Afghanistan nor the Islamic State of Afghanistan
5	Antonio Segura Morís (Note: Resident in Islamabad.)	27 July 2002 – 1 February 2005 (2 years, 189 days)	Ana Palacio	Juan Carlos I	Hamid Karzai
-	Ángel Losada Fernández (Note: Ambassador to the International Security Assistance Force (ISAF).)	27 August 2004 – 17 December 2005 (1 year, 108 days)	Miguel Ángel Moratinos	Juan Carlos I	-
-	José Luis Solano Gadea (Note: Ambassador-at-large for the Reconstruction and Political Stability of Afghanistan.)	26 August 2005 – 29 July 2006 (337 days)	Miguel Ángel Moratinos	Juan Carlos I	-
6	José Turpín	4 March 2006 – 9 October 2010 (4 years, 219 days)	Miguel Ángel Moratinos	Juan Carlos I	Hamid Karzai
7	Juan José Rubio de Urquía	6 November 2010 – 30 May 2015 (4 years, 205 days)	Trinidad Jiménez	Juan Carlos I	Hamid Karzai
8	Emilio Pérez de Ágreda Sáez	11 July 2015 – 15 September 2018 (4 years, 219 days)	José Manuel García-Margallo	Felipe VI	Ashraf Ghani
9	Gabriel Ferrán Carrión	2 October 2018 – 4 August 2021 (2 years, 306 days)	Josep Borrell	Felipe VI	Ashraf Ghani
10	Ricardo Losa Giménez (Note: Resident in Doha, Qatar.)	4 August 2021 – 4 December 2025 (4 years, 122 days)	José Manuel Albares	Felipe VI	-
-	José Pascual Marco Martínez (Note: Ambassador-at-large for Afghanistan)	4 December 2025 – present (277 days)	José Manuel Albares	Felipe VI	-

== See also ==
- Afghanistan–Spain relations
