= Permanent Representative of Spain to the United Nations in Vienna =

Senior Spanish diplomat

Ambassador Permanent Representative of Spain to the United Nations Office and Other International Organizations in Vienna
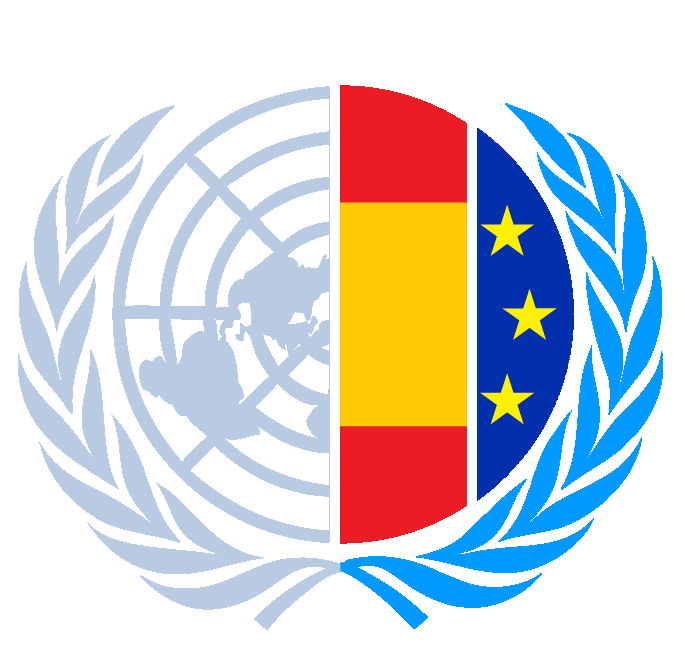
- Emblem of the Spanish Mission to the UN

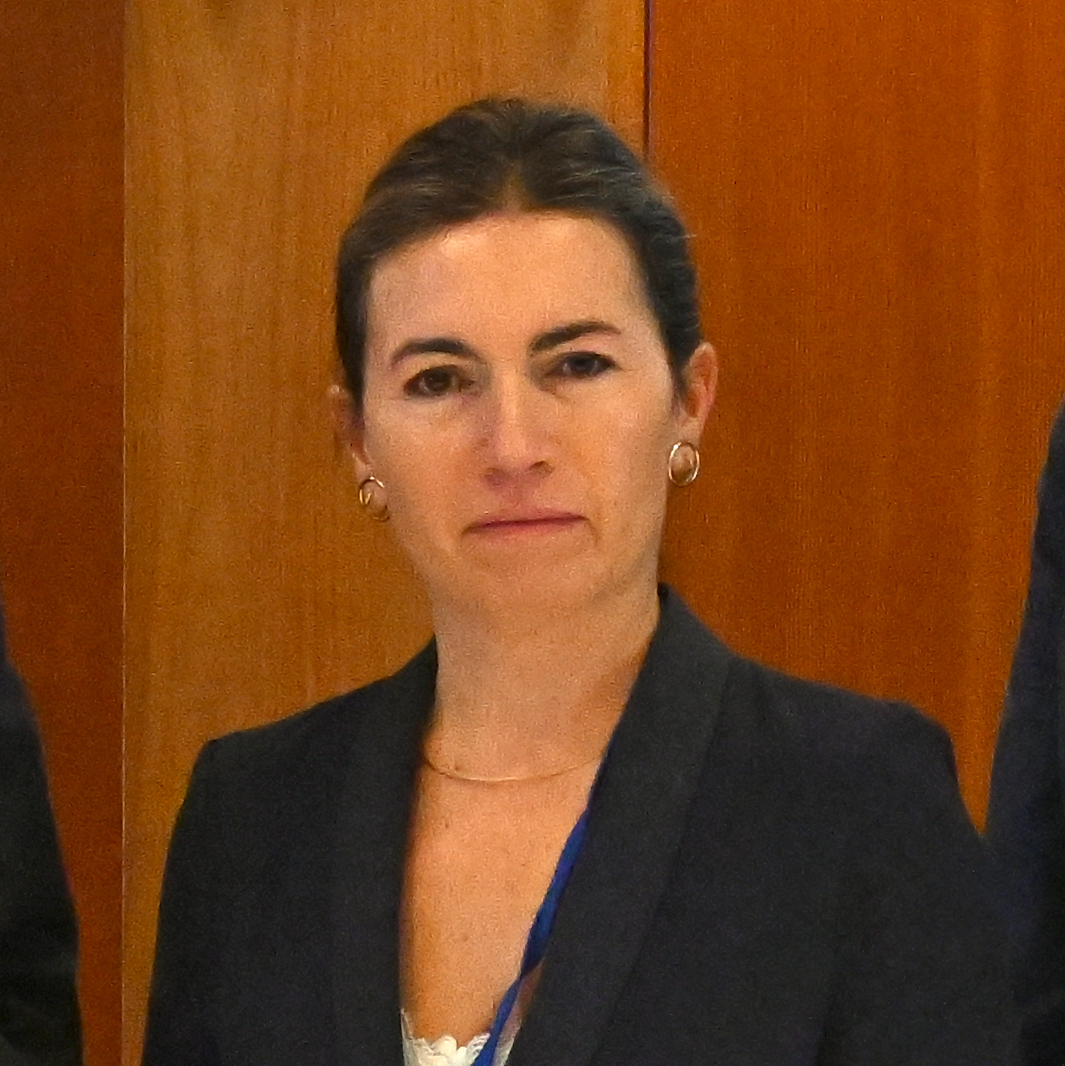
- Incumbent; María Sebastián de Erice since 31 July 2024
- Ministry of Foreign Affairs; Secretariat of State for Foreign Affairs
- Style: His Excellency
- Member of: Permanent Mission of Spain to the United Nations in Vienna
- Residence: Vienna, Austria
- Nominator: The Foreign Minister
- Appointer: The Monarch
- Inaugural holder: Enrique Suárez de Puga
- Formation: October 10, 1980; 45 years ago
- Website: Mission to the UN Vienna

The ambassador permanent representative of Spain to the United Nations Office and Other International Organizations in Vienna is the official representative of the Kingdom of Spain to the United Nations Office at Vienna.

The office was established on 10 October 1980, when diplomat Enrique Suárez de Puga, former ambassador to the Organization of American States, was appointed as permanent representative to the International Atomic Energy Agency (IAEA) and other international organizations based in Vienna. In 1983 the position was elevated to the rank of Ambassador Extraordinary and Plenipotentiary and, in July 1987, the Permanent Representation was formally established.

== Permanent Representation ==
As of 2025, it is formed by:

- The Permanent Representative, with the rank of Ambassador Extraordinary and Plenipotentiary.
- The Deputy Permanent Representative, with the rank of Ambassador.
- The Technical Counsellors, who head the technical offices and assist the representatives in their area of competence.

There are currently three technical offices:

- The Technical Office for Industrial and Energy Cooperation, led by a Counsellor appointed by joint order of the ministers of industry and of ecological transition.
- The Technical Office for Social Affairs, led by a Counsellor appointed by the minister of social affairs.
- The Technical Office for Drugs and Narcotics, led by a Counsellor appointed by the minister of health.

They are assisted by several diplomatic counsellors, attachés and other civil servants, as well as a Chancellery.

== List of ambassadors ==
Ambassadors		Term		Monarch
1	Enrique Suárez de Puga	1980	1987	Juan Carlos I
2	Eloy Ybáñez Bueno	1987	1990	Juan Carlos I
3	Fernando Arias-Salgado	1990	1993	Juan Carlos I
4	José Antonio de Yturriaga	1993	1996	Juan Carlos I
5	Antonio Ortiz García	1996	2000	Juan Carlos I
6	Antonio Núñez García-Saúco	2000	2004	Juan Carlos I
7	Aurelio Pérez Giralda	2004	2006	Juan Carlos I
8	José Luis Roselló Serra	2006	2010	Juan Carlos I
9	Carmen Buján Freire	2010	2014	Juan Carlos I
10	Gonzalo de Salazar Serantes	2014	2018	Felipe VI
11	Senén Florensa i Palau	2018	2020	Felipe VI
12	Esther Monterrubio Villar	2020	2024	Felipe VI
13	María Sebastián de Erice	2024		Felipe VI
