= Juan González-Barba Pera =

Spanish diplomat (born 1966)

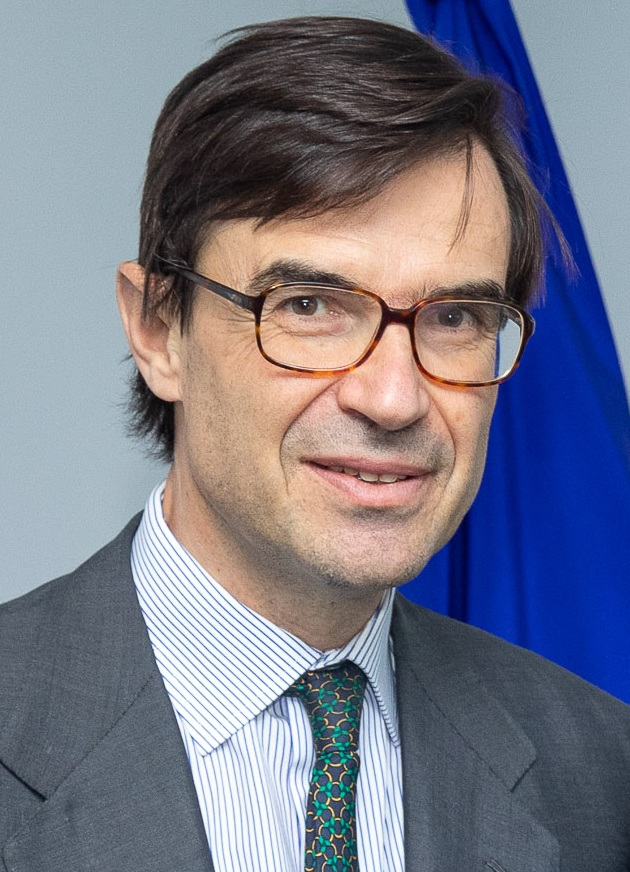
- Juan González-Barba Pera in 2020

Ambassador of Spain to Croatia
- In office 30 March 2022 – 7 May 2025
- Prime Minister: Pedro Sánchez
- Preceded by: Alonso Dezcallar de Mazarredo
- Succeeded by: José Ramón García

Secretary of State for the European Union
- In office 5 February 2020 – 22 December 2021
- Prime Minister: Pedro Sánchez
- Preceded by: Marco Aguiriano
- Succeeded by: Pascual Navarro Ríos

Ambassador of Spain to Turkey
- In office 1 September 2018 – 5 February 2020
- Prime Minister: Pedro Sánchez
- Preceded by: Rafael Mendívil Peydro
- Succeeded by: Francisco Javier Hergueta

Ambassador of Spain to Sudan
- In office 10 July 2012 – 30 May 2015
- Prime Minister: Mariano Rajoy
- Preceded by: Ramón Gil-Casares
- Succeeded by: Juan José Rubio de Urquía
Other posts
Directorate-General for the Maghreb, Africa, the Mediterranean and the Middle East
In office 14 January 2012 – 26 May 2012
Prime Minister	Mariano Rajoy
Preceded by	Himself
Succeeded by	Ignacio Ybáñez Rubio
Directorate-General for the Mediterranean, the Maghreb and the Middle East
In office 16 October 2010 – 31 December 2011
Prime Minister	José Luis Rodríguez Zapatero
Preceded by	Fidel Sendagorta Gómez
Succeeded by	Himself

Personal details
- Party: Democracia 21
- Education: University of Seville

Juan González-Barba Pera (Seville, 1966) is a Spanish diplomat and writer.

== Career ==
While studying Law at the University of Seville he became interested in the diplomatic career.

He has formed part of the Spanish Embassies in South Africa, Greece, Israel and the Permanent Representation of Spain to the European Union.

He has been the Ambassador of Spain to Sudan, South Sudan and Eritea (2012–2015); Turkey, Azerbaijan and Georgia (2018–2020) and Croatia (2022–2025).

While part of the central services of the Spanish Ministry of Foreign Affairs, he has been Deputy Director-General for Cultural Exterior Action (2000–2001), Director-General for the Maghreb, Mediterranean and Middle East (2010–2011), Spanish Representative in the International Syria Support Group (2016) and Secretary of State for the European Union (2020–2021).

In 2022 he assumed the Embassy of Spain to Croatia, however he was later terminated in 2025 by Minister of Foreign Affairs José Manuel Albares. The termination came after González-Barba published an article in El Confidencial showing support to the Spanish Monarchy and the parliamentary monarchy system.

In 2026, he joined the political party Democracia 21 as vicepresident.

== Publications ==
Juan González-Barba has published 3 novels:

- El corresponsal en Oriente Medio (2010)
- Y la luna tocó el mar bajo Sevilla (2018)
- Seguiriyas sudanesas (2022)

He has also published an essay, Europa: la otra patria (2026), and writes articles about foreign and European policy in El País, El Confidencial, El Español, El Mundo and the journals Política Exterior and Cuenta y Razón.
