= List of ambassadors of Spain to South Korea =

Ambassador of Spain to South Korea
- Coat of arms of Spain
- Incumbent; Julio Herraiz España since 12 July 2025
- Ministry of Foreign Affairs; Secretariat of State for Foreign Affairs
- Style: The Most Excellent
- Residence: Seoul
- Nominator: The Foreign Minister
- Appointer: The Monarch
- Term length: At the government's pleasure
- Inaugural holder: Antonio Villacieros y Benito
- Formation: 1962
- Website: Mission of Spain to Korea

The ambassador of Spain to South Korea is the official representative of the Kingdom of Spain to the Republic of Korea (South Korea). It is also accredited to the Democratic People's Republic of Korea (North Korea).

South Korea and Spain established diplomatic relations in March 1950. Initially, the affairs of the Korean Peninsula were the responsibility of the ambassador to Japan (1950–1973), who acted as minister of Spain to the president of South Korea. In 1962 the diplomatic mission was elevated to the rank of embassy and, since 1973, the ambassador has resided in Seoul.

== Jurisdiction ==
- South Korea: The ambassador is responsible for South Korea–Spain relations and the Embassy's Consular Section provides consular protection to the entire Korea.

The ambassador is also accredited to:

- North Korea: Prime minister José María Aznar announced the establishment of diplomatic relations with North Korea in October 2000, during the 3rd Asia–Europe Meeting, and it was approved by the Council of Ministers in December that year. Bilateral relations were formally established in 2001 and the ambassador to China was accredited as ambassador to North Korea. Since 2006, the ambassador to South Korea is dually accredited to North Korea.

== List of ministers (1950–1962) ==
Name	Term	Nominated by	Appointed by	Accredited to
Francisco José del Castillo y Campos (Note: Resident in Tokyo.)	14 May 1950 – 15 June 1954† (4 years, 32 days)	Alberto Martín-Artajo	Francisco Franco	Syngman Rhee
Pelayo García-Olay y Álvarez	30 July 1954 – 9 October 1957 (3 years, 71 days)	Alberto Martín-Artajo	Francisco Franco	Syngman Rhee
Antonio Villaderos y Benito	17 December 1957 – 6 April 1962 (4 years, 110 days)	Fernando María Castiella	Francisco Franco	Syngman Rhee

== List of ambassadors (since 1962) ==
Name	Term	Nominated by	Appointed by	Accredited to
Antonio Villacieros y Benito	6 April 1962 – 10 July 1964 (2 years, 95 days)	Fernando María Castiella	Francisco Franco	Park Chung Hee
Luis García de Llera y Rodríguez	29 May 1965 – 7 February 1970 (4 years, 254 days)	Fernando María Castiella	Francisco Franco	Park Chung Hee
Alfonso Merry del Val y Alzola; Marquess of Merry del Val	7 March 1970 – 2 June 1973 (3 years, 87 days)	Gregorio López-Bravo	Francisco Franco	Park Chung Hee
José María Aguado Saralegui	2 June 1973 – 26 June 1978 (5 years, 24 days)	Gregorio López-Bravo	Francisco Franco	Park Chung Hee
Luis Cuervo Fábrega	26 June 1978 – 2 February 1982 (3 years, 221 days)	The Marquess of Oreja	Juan Carlos I	Park Chung Hee
Ramiro Pérez-Maura; Duke of Maura	2 February 1982 – 7 November 1985 (3 years, 278 days)	José Pedro Pérez-Llorca	Juan Carlos I	Chun Doo-hwan
Fermín Prieto-Castro Roumier	2 April 1986 – 30 September 1991 (5 years, 181 days)	Francisco Fernández Ordóñez	Juan Carlos I	Chun Doo-hwan
Antonio Cosano Pérez	1 October 1991 – 8 June 1994 (2 years, 250 days)	Francisco Fernández Ordóñez	Juan Carlos I	Roh Tae-woo
Carlos Alonso Zaldívar	27 June 1994 – 26 November 1996 (2 years, 152 days)	Javier Solana	Juan Carlos I	Kim Young-sam
Enrique Romeu Ramos	26 November 1996 – 3 November 2001 (4 years, 342 days)	Abel Matutes	Juan Carlos I	Kim Young-sam
Enrique Panés Calpe	3 November 2001 – 31 May 2005 (3 years, 209 days)	Josep Piqué	Juan Carlos I	Kim Dae-jung
Delfín Colomé (Note: Accredited to North Korea.)	5 July 2005 – 11 April 2008† (2 years, 281 days)	Miguel Ángel Moratinos	Juan Carlos I	Roh Moo-hyun
Juan Bautista Leña Casas	20 September 2008 – 11 December 2010 (2 years, 82 days)	Miguel Ángel Moratinos	Juan Carlos I	Lee Myung-bak
Luis Arias Romero	8 January 2011 – 2 August 2014 (3 years, 206 days)	Trinidad Jiménez	Juan Carlos I	Lee Myung-bak
Gonzalo Ortiz Díez-Tortosa	2 August 2014 – 23 October 2018 (4 years, 82 days)	José Manuel García-Margallo	Felipe VI	Park Geun-hye
Juan Ignacio Morro	23 October 2018 – 6 July 2022 (3 years, 256 days)	Josep Borrell	Felipe VI	Moon Jae-in
Guillermo Kirkpatrick de la Vega	6 July 2022 – 2 July 2025 (2 years, 361 days)	José Manuel Albares	Felipe VI	Yoon Suk Yeol
Julio Herraiz España	2 July 2025 – present (126 days)	José Manuel Albares	Felipe VI	Lee Jae Myung

== See also ==
- South Korea–Spain relations
- North Korea–Spain relations
