= List of ambassadors of Spain to Bolivia =

Ambassador of Spain to Bolivia
- Coat of arms of Spain

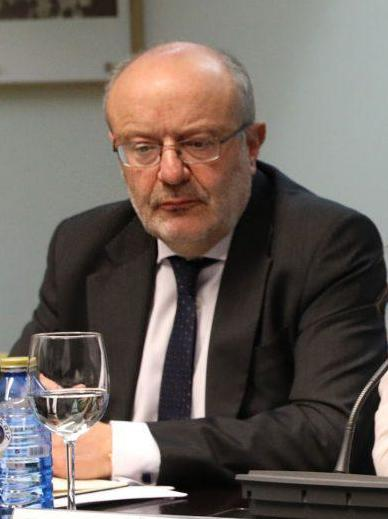
- Incumbent; Fernando García Casas since 12 June 2024
- Ministry of Foreign Affairs; Secretariat of State for Ibero-America
- Style: The Most Excellent
- Residence: La Paz
- Nominator: The Foreign Minister
- Appointer: The Monarch
- Term length: At the government's pleasure
- Inaugural holder: Francisco de Amat y Torres
- Formation: 1949
- Website: Mission of Spain to Bolivia

The ambassador of Spain to Bolivia is the official representative of the Kingdom of Spain to the Plurinational State of Bolivia.

Negotiations between Spain and the young Bolivian republic began in 1847 and the treaty of recognition, peace and friendship was signed by the diplomatic representatives on 21 July 1847, a date considered the starting point of diplomatic relations between the two countries. However, the overthrow of president José Ballivián and the political consequences that followed prevented its ratification until 1861.

For the next 20 years, diplomatic relations would stagnate and both nations even went to war during the Chincha Islands War. During this time, most matters concerning Bolivia were handled through the Minister in Peru, since although a chargé d'affaires was appointed in 1864, he never took office and no one new was appointed until 1881, when Spain and Bolivia signed a new peace and friendship treaty. In November 1949, the legation in La Paz was elevated to the rank of embassy.

== List of ambassadors to Bolivia ==
This list was compiled using the work "History of the Spanish Diplomacy" by the Spanish historian and diplomat Miguel Ángel Ochoa Brun. The work covers up to the year 2000, so the rest is based on appointments published in the Boletín Oficial del Estado.

Name	Rank	Term
José Brunetti y Gayoso, Duke of Arcos	Chargé d'affaires	1881–1882
Emilio de Ojeda y Perpiñán	Chargé d'affaires	1882–1883
Salvador de Cea Bermúdez	Chargé d'affaires a.i.	1883–1884
The Minister to Peru		1883–1929
Formerio González de la Iglesia	Chargé d'affaires	1928–1929
Alberto de Aguilar y Gómez-Acebo	Minister	1929
Eduardo Sáenz Santander	Minister	1929
Pedro García-Conde y Menéndez	Minister	1929–1930
Pedro de Prat y Soutzo	Minister	1930–1932
Julio Prieto Villabrille	Minister	1933
Rafael Triana Blasco	Minister	1933–1939
Adolfo Pérez-Caballero y Moltó	Chargé d'affaires	1939–1943
Francisco José del Castillo y Campos	Minister	1943–1945
Ramón María de Pujadas y Gastón	Minister	1945–1946
José Gallostra y Coello de Portugal	Minister	1947–1948
Francisco de Amat y Torres	Minister	1948–1949
Francisco de Amat y Torres	Ambassador	1949–1954
Miguel Sáenz de Llanos	Ambassador	1954–1955
Mariano Amoedo y Galarmendi	Ambassador	1955–1957
Pedro López García	Ambassador	1957–1959
Joaquín Manuel Rodríguez de Gortázar y Pastor	Ambassador	1959–1962
Rafael Ferrer Sagreras	Ambassador	1962–1964
Luis Arroyo Aznar	Ambassador	1964–1969
Víctor Sánchez-Mesas y Juste	Ambassador	1969–1972
Eduardo García Ontiveros y Herrera	Ambassador	1972–1974
Juan Luis Maestro de León Boletti	Ambassador	1974–1979
Tomás Lozano Escribano	Ambassador	1979–1986
Fausto Navarro Izquierdo	Ambassador	1986–1990
Carmelo Angulo Barturen	Ambassador	1990–1993
Fernando Martínez Westerhausen	Ambassador	1993–1996
Manuel Viturro de la Torre	Ambassador	1996–2001
Víctor Luis Fagilde González	Ambassador	2001–2004
Juan Francisco Montalbán Carrasco	Ambassador	2004–2008
Ramón Santos	Ambassador	2008–2012
Ángel María Vázquez Díaz de Tuesta	Ambassador	2012–2017
Enrique Ojeda Vila	Ambassador	2017–2018
Emilio Pérez de Ágreda Sáez	Ambassador	2018–2020
Francisco Javier Gassó Matoses	Ambassador	2020–2024
Fernando García Casas	Ambassador	2024–pres.

== Bibliography ==
- Guerrero Balfagón, Enrique (1964). "El reconocimiento de la independencia de Bolivia por España" [The recognition of Bolivia's independence by Spain] (PDF). Revista de estudios políticos (in Spanish) (135–136): 181–234. ISSN 0048-7694. Archived from the original (PDF) on June 6, 2025 – via Centre for Political and Constitutional Studies.
