= List of ambassadors of Spain to Croatia =

Ambassador of Spain to Croatia
- Coat of arms of Spain

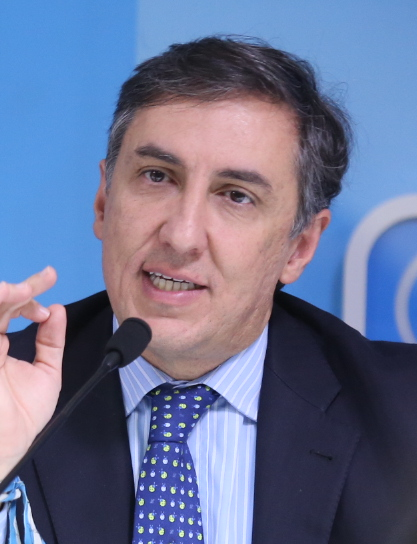
- Incumbent; José Ramón García Hernández since 7 May 2025
- Ministry of Foreign Affairs; Secretariat of State for the European Union
- Style: The Most Excellent
- Residence: Zagreb
- Nominator: The Foreign Minister
- Appointer: The Monarch
- Term length: At the government's pleasure
- Inaugural holder: Luis de la Torre de Andrés
- Formation: 1992
- Website: Mission of Spain to Croatia

The ambassador of Spain to Croatia is the official representative of the Kingdom of Spain to the Republic of Croatia.

Spain established diplomatic relations with the Independent State of Croatia (1941–1945), a puppet state of the Axis powers during the World War II. Diplomatic relations with the current Republic of Croatia were established on 9 March 1992. The first ambassador, Luis de la Torre de Andrés, was resident in Budapest, Hungary.

== List of ambassadors ==
=== List of ministers to the Independent State of Croatia ===
Name	Term	Nominated by	Appointed by	Accredited to
Vicente González-Arnao y de Amar de la Torre (Note: Envoy Extraordinary and Minister Plenipotentiary)	1941–1944	Ramón Serrano Suñer	Francisco Franco	Tomislav II
Rafael Maspóns de Grasset (Note: Chargé d'affaires)	1944–1945	-	Francisco Franco	Tomislav II

=== List of ambassadors to the Republic of Croatia ===
Ambassador		Term	Nominated by	Appointed by	Accredited to
1	Luis de la Torre de Andrés (Note: Resident in Budapest.)	18 June 1992 – 27 April 1993 (313 days)	Francisco Fernández Ordóñez	Juan Carlos I	Franjo Tuđman
2	Luis Felipe Fernández de la Peña	27 April 1993 – 18 July 1998 (5 years, 82 days)	Javier Solana	Juan Carlos I	Franjo Tuđman
3	Antonio Pedauyé González	18 July 1998 – 28 December 2002 (4 years, 163 days)	Abel Matutes	Juan Carlos I	Franjo Tuđman
4	Álvaro Sebastián de Erice y Gómez-Acebo	28 December 2002 – 3 December 2005 (2 years, 340 days)	Ana Palacio	Juan Carlos I	Stjepan Mesić
5	Manuel Salazar Palma	3 December 2005 – 6 November 2010 (4 years, 338 days)	Miguel Ángel Moratinos	Juan Carlos I	Stjepan Mesić
6	Rodrigo Aguirre de Cárcer	6 November 2010 – 12 July 2014 (3 years, 248 days)	Trinidad Jiménez	Juan Carlos I	Ivo Josipović
7	Eduardo Aznar Campos	12 July 2014 – 8 September 2018 (4 years, 58 days)	José Manuel García-Margallo	Felipe VI	Ivo Josipović
8	Alonso Dezcallar	2 October 2018 – 30 March 2022 (3 years, 179 days)	Josep Borrell	Felipe VI	Kolinda Grabar-Kitarović
9	Juan González-Barba Pera	30 March 2022 – 7 May 2025 (3 years, 38 days)	José Manuel Albares	Felipe VI	Zoran Milanović
10	José Ramón García Hernández	7 May 2025 – present (1 year, 183 days)	José Manuel Albares	Felipe VI	Zoran Milanović

== See also ==
- Croatia–Spain relations
