= List of ambassadors of Spain to Thailand =

Ambassador of Spain to Thailand
- Coat of arms of Spain
- Incumbent; Manuel Nuche Bascón since 30 June 2026
- Ministry of Foreign Affairs; Secretariat of State for Foreign Affairs
- Style: The Most Excellent
- Residence: Bangkok
- Nominator: The Foreign Minister
- Appointer: The Monarch
- Term length: At the government's pleasure
- Inaugural holder: Santiago Tabanera Ruiz
- Formation: 1961
- Website: Mission of Spain to Thailand

The ambassador of Spain to Thailand is the official representative of the Kingdom of Spain to the Kingdom of Thailand. It is also accredited to the Kingdom of Cambodia, the Lao People's Democratic Republic and the Republic of the Union of Myanmar.

Spain had some contact with the Kingdom of Siam between the 16th and 18th centuries, during the times of the Ayutthaya Kingdom. In 1870, both Kingdoms formalized their relations with the signing of a Treaty of Friendship, Trade and Navigation. Spain established a Consulate in Bangkok, but it was largely inactive, and consular services to Spaniards were often provided by diplomats from other European powers. Diplomatic relations were managed by the Embassy of Spain to China until 1949, when a chargé d'affaires—later envoy—was appointed, based in Bangkok. In 1961, the Spanish legation in the Thai capital was elevated to the rank of embassy.

== Jurisdiction ==
- Thailand: Resident in Bangkok, the ambassador manages Spain's diplomatic relations with the Thai Kingdom. The Embassy's consular section gives services to the entire country. It has also honorary consulates in Chiang Mai and Phuket.

The ambassador to Thailand is also accredited to:

- Cambodia: Spain and Cambodia established diplomatic relations in 1964. Consular services are provided by the French Embassy in Phnom Penh, although Spain has an honorary consul in the city.
- Laos: Spain and Cambodia established diplomatic relations in 1967. Consular services are provided by the German Embassy in Vientiane, although Spain has an honorary consul in the city.
- Myanmar: First contacts between Burma and Spain took place in the late 1870s, during the Konbaung dynasty, however, annexation by the British Crown prevented them from going further. Finally, diplomatic relations were established in 1967, during the dictatorship of Francisco Franco. Consular services are provided by the French Embassy in Yangon. Spain also counts with a "Diplomatic Antenna" in the country's capital.

In the past, this ambassador has also served as ambassador to Malaysia (1967–1986), Singapore (1968–1990) and Vietnam (South Vietnam 1964–1972 and Vietnam 1990–1992).

== List of ambassadors (1598–1962) ==
Name	Term	Rank	Appointed by
Juan Tello de Aguirre	1598	Envoy	The Governor-General of the Philippines, in the name of the King of Spain.
Jaun Ruiz de Ycoaga	1598	Envoy	The Governor-General of the Philippines, in the name of the King of Spain.
Juan de Mendoza Gamboa	1598	Envoy	The Governor-General of the Philippines, in the name of the King of Spain.
Fray Francisco de Anunciación	1618	Envoy	The Governor-General of the Philippines, in the name of the King of Spain.
Pedro de Morejón	1626	Ambassador	The Governor-General of the Philippines, in the name of the King of Spain.
Antonio Cardim	1626	Ambassador	The Governor-General of the Philippines, in the name of the King of Spain.
Francisco Enríquez de Lojada	1656	Ambassador	The Governor-General of the Philippines, in the name of the King of Spain.
Juan Ventura Serra	1673	Envoy	The Governor-General of the Philippines, in the name of the King of Spain.
Gregorio Alejandro de Bustamante y Bustillo	1718	Ambassador	The Governor-General of the Philippines, in the name of the King of Spain.
Adolfo Patxot (Note: Also envoy to China and Annam.)	1870–1871	Envoy	The Duke of the Tower, Regent of Spain
Juan Manuel Pereira	1871–1873	Envoy	Amadeo I
The ambassador to China from 1872 to 1949
Fernando Vázquez Méndez	1949–1951	Chargé d'affaires	Francisco Franco
Fernando Vázquez Méndez	1951–1961	Minister	Francisco Franco

== List of ambassadors (since 1962) ==
Ambassador		Term	Nominated by	Appointed by	Accredited to
1	Santiago Ruiz Tabanera (Note: Accredited to Cambodia and South Vietnam.)	15 June 1962 – 10 April 1967 (4 years, 299 days)	Fernando María Castiella	Francisco Franco	Rama IX
2	Emilio Beladíez Navarro (Note: Accredited to Malaysia, Singapore and South Vietnam.)	19 June 1967 – 27 October 1969 (2 years, 130 days)	Fernando María Castiella	Francisco Franco	Rama IX
3	Carlos Fernández de Henestrosa y Le Motheux (Note: Accredited to Cambodia, Laos, Malaysia, Singapore and South Vietnam.); Marquess of Villadarias	27 October 1969 – 22 July 1972 (2 years, 269 days)	Fernando María Castiella	Francisco Franco	Rama IX
4	Mariano Sanz Briz	22 July 1972 – 17 July 1975 (2 years, 360 days)	Alfredo Sánchez Bella	Francisco Franco	Rama IX
5	Antonio Cirera y Prim (Note: Accredited to Malaysia and Singapore.)	9 September 1975 – 21 October 1977 (2 years, 42 days)	Pedro Cortina Mauri	Francisco Franco	Rama IX
6	Nicolás Revenga Domínguez (Note: Accredited to Burma, Malaysia and Singapore.)	26 June 1978 – 23 January 1986 (7 years, 211 days)	The Marquess of Oreja	Juan Carlos I	Rama IX
7	Carlos Reparaz Madinaveitia (Note: Accredited to Burma, Laos and Singapore.)	22 March 1986 – 11 September 1990 (4 years, 173 days)	Francisco Fernández Ordóñez	Juan Carlos I	Rama IX
8	Tomás Chávarri Rivero (Note: Accredited to Cambodia, Laos, Myanmar and Vietnam.)	11 September 1990 – 4 October 1994 (4 years, 23 days)	Francisco Fernández Ordóñez	Juan Carlos I	Rama IX
9	Carlos Spottorno Díaz-Caro	8 October 1994 – 2 September 1996 (1 year, 330 days)	Javier Solana	Juan Carlos I	Rama IX
10	César González Palacios (Note: Accredited to Cambodia, Laos and Myanmar.)	2 September 1996 – 23 June 2001 (4 years, 294 days)	Abel Matutes	Juan Carlos I	Rama IX
11	José Eugenio Salarich	14 July 2001 – 8 May 2004 (2 years, 299 days)	Josep Piqué	Juan Carlos I	Rama IX
12	Juan Manuel López Nadal	18 September 2004 – 7 February 2009 (4 years, 142 days)	Miguel Ángel Moratinos	Juan Carlos I	Rama IX
13	Ignacio Sagaz Temprano (Note: Accredited to Laos and Myanmar.)	7 February 2009 – 1 December 2012 (3 years, 298 days)	Miguel Ángel Moratinos	Juan Carlos I	Rama IX
14	María del Carmen Moreno Raymundo	1 December 2012 – 17 June 2017 (4 years, 198 days)	José Manuel García-Margallo	Juan Carlos I	Rama IX
15	Emilio de Miguel Calabia	17 June 2017 – 8 December 2021 (4 years, 174 days)	Alfonso Dastis	Felipe VI	Rama X
16	Felipe de la Morena	8 December 2021 – 30 June 2026 (4 years, 204 days)	José Manuel Albares	Felipe VI	Rama X
17	Manuel Nuche Bascón	30 June 2026 – present (69 days)	José Manuel Albares	Felipe VI	Rama X

== See also ==
- Spain–Thailand relations
