= List of ambassadors of Spain to Nigeria =

Ambassador of Spain to Nigeria
- Coat of arms of Spain
- Incumbent; Félix Costales Artieda since 28 May 2025
- Ministry of Foreign Affairs; Secretariat of State for Foreign Affairs
- Style: The Most Excellent
- Residence: Abuja
- Nominator: The Foreign Minister
- Appointer: The Monarch
- Term length: At the government's pleasure
- Inaugural holder: Antonio Vidal Gabás
- Formation: 1962
- Website: Mission of Spain to Nigeria

The ambassador of Spain to Nigeria is the official representative of the Kingdom of Spain to the Federal Republic of Nigeria. It is also accredited to the Republic of Benin and the Economic Community of West African States (ECOWAS).

== Jurisdiction ==
- Nigeria: The Embassy of Spain in Abuja manages Nigeria–Spain relations, as well as the diplomatic relations with Benin and those related to the ECOWAS. Diplomatic services to these countries are managed through the Consular Section of the Embassy and the Consulate-General in Lagos.

The ambassador is also accredited to:

- Benin: Dahomey (today Benin) and Spain established diplomatic relations on 25 March 1966 and, except for a brief interruption between 1968 and 1978, the ambassador to Nigeria has been responsible for this country. Spain has an honorary consulate in Cotonou.

In the past, this ambassador was also in charge of Sierra Leone (1991–1993) and Togo (1965–1968).

== List of ambassadors ==
Name	Term	Nominated by	Appointed by	Accredited to
Antonio Vidal Gabás (Note: Chargé d'affaires from 10 April 1961 to 21 September 1962.)	21 September 1962 – 11 May 1964 (1 year, 233 days)	Fernando María Castiella	Francisco Franco	Nnamdi Azikiwe
José Luis Aparicio y Aparicio (Note: Accredited to Benin and Togo.)	11 May 1964 – 20 April 1968 (3 years, 345 days)	Fernando María Castiella	Francisco Franco	Nnamdi Azikiwe
Carlos Martínez de Orense y García	20 April 1968 – 19 December 1969† (1 year, 243 days)	Fernando María Castiella	Francisco Franco	Yakubu Gowon
Eduardo Sebastián de Erice y O'Shea	17 April 1970 – 28 January 1976 (5 years, 286 days)	Gregorio López-Bravo	Francisco Franco	Yakubu Gowon
Domingo Sánchez Sánchez	12 August 1976 – 28 July 1978 (1 year, 352 days)	The Marquess of Oreja	Juan Carlos I	Olusegun Obasanjo
José Luis Castillejo (Note: Accredited to Benin.)	28 July 1978 – 26 May 1986 (7 years, 302 days)	The Marquess of Oreja	Juan Carlos I	Olusegun Obasanjo
Joaquín María de Arístegui y Petit	26 May 1986 – 1 July 1991 (5 years, 36 days)	Francisco Fernández Ordóñez	Juan Carlos I	Ibrahim Babangida
Carlos Bárcena Portolés (Note: Accredited to Benin and Sierra Leone.)	11 September 1991 – 12 June 1993 (1 year, 274 days)	Francisco Fernández Ordóñez	Juan Carlos I	Ibrahim Babangida
Manuel Pombo Bravo	26 June 1993 – 15 January 1998 (4 years, 203 days)	Javier Solana	Juan Carlos I	Ibrahim Babangida
Manuel Cacho Quesada	26 February 1998 – 8 December 2001 (3 years, 285 days)	Abel Matutes	Juan Carlos I	Sani Abacha
Alfonso Manuel Portabales Vázquez	12 January 2002 – 21 January 2006 (4 years, 9 days)	Josep Piqué	Juan Carlos I	Olusegun Obasanjo
Ángel Losada Fernández	21 January 2006 – 8 January 2011 (4 years, 352 days)	Miguel Ángel Moratinos	Juan Carlos I	Olusegun Obasanjo
Álvaro Castillo Aguilar	8 January 2011 – 12 July 2014 (3 years, 185 days)	Trinidad Jiménez	Juan Carlos I	Goodluck Jonathan
Alfonso Barnuevo	12 July 2014 – 22 July 2017 (3 years, 10 days)	José Manuel García-Margallo	Felipe VI	Goodluck Jonathan
Marcelino Cabanas Ansorena	26 August 2017 – 22 December 2021 (4 years, 118 days)	Alfonso Dastis	Felipe VI	Muhammadu Buhari
Juan Ignacio Sell	22 December 2021 – 15 January 2025 (3 years, 24 days)	José Manuel Albares	Felipe VI	Muhammadu Buhari
Félix Costales Artieda	28 May 2025 – present (1 year, 152 days)	José Manuel Albares	Felipe VI	Bola Tinubu

== See also ==
- Nigeria–Spain relations
