= List of ambassadors of Spain to the Philippines =

Ambassador of Kingdom of Spain to the Republic of the Philippines
- Embajador del Reino de España ante la República de Filipinas; Sugo ng Kaharian ng Espanya sa Republika ng Pilipinas
- Coat of arms of Spain

- Incumbent; Xavier Martí Martí since September 30, 2026
- Ministry of Foreign Affairs; Secretariat of State for Foreign Affairs
- Style: The Most Excellent
- Reports to: The Foreign Minister
- Seat: Level 27, Equitable Bank Tower, 8751 Paseo de Roxas, Makati, Metro Manila
- Nominator: The Foreign Minister
- Appointer: The Monarch
- Term length: At the government's pleasure
- Inaugural holder: Teodomiro de Aguilar (minister); Antonio Gullón (ambassador)
- Formation: September 20, 1946
- Website: Spanish Embassy, Manila

The Ambassador of Spain to the Philippines is the official representative of the Kingdom of Spain to the Republic of the Philippines. As head of Spain's diplomatic mission there, the ambassador is the official representative of the monarch and government of Spain to the president and the government of the Philippines. The position has the rank and status of an ambassador extraordinary and plenipotentiary and the embassy is located on the 27th Floor, Equitable Bank Tower, 8751 Paseo de Roxas, Makati, Metro Manila.

This diplomatic post and the embassy have jurisdiction over the countries of the Philippines, Marshall Islands, Federated States of Micronesia, and Palau. It formerly covered the jurisdiction over the countries of Indonesia until 1972 and China until 1959.

== Heads of mission ==
Diplomatic ranks
Ambassador
Envoy
Resident minister
Consul
Charge d'affaires

Name	Start	End	Appointed by	Accredited during the administration of	Notes	References
Teodomiro de Aguilar	September 20, 1946	December 9, 1949	Francisco Franco	Manuel Roxas		
Antonio Gullón	February 24, 1950	March 12, 1954	Francisco Franco	Elpidio Quirino		
Fermín Sanz-Orrio	May 5, 1954	July 26, 1956	Francisco Franco	Ramon Magsaysay		
Francisco Javier Conde García	July 26, 1956	December 17, 1959	Francisco Franco	Ramon Magsaysay		
Mariano Vidal Tolosana	February 4, 1960	February 8, 1962	Francisco Franco	Carlos P. García		
Jaime Alba Delibes	February 8, 1962	February 15, 1963	Francisco Franco	Diosdado Macapagal		
Miguel Teus	March 21, 1963	April 7, 1966	Francisco Franco	Diosdado Macapagal		
José Pérez del Arco	April 7, 1966	March 6, 1970	Francisco Franco	Ferdinand E. Marcos Sr.		
Nicolás Martín Alonso	June 11, 1970	June 6, 1975	Francisco Franco	Ferdinand E. Marcos Sr.		
Cleofé Liquiniano Elgorriaga	August 23, 1975	July 24, 1981	Carlos Arias Navarro	Ferdinand E. Marcos Sr.		
Pedro Ortiz-Armengol	July 24, 1981	February 20, 1987	Leopoldo Calvo-Sotelo	Ferdinand E. Marcos Sr.		
Enrique Romeu Ramos	February 20, 1987	July 26, 1991	Felipe González	Corazón Aquino		
Herminio Morales Fernández	August 30, 1991	December 5, 1996	Felipe González	Corazón Aquino		
Delfín Colomé	December 5, 1996	November 10, 2000	José María Aznar	Fidel V. Ramos		
Tomás Rodríguez-Pantoja Márquez	January 12, 2001	January 10, 2003	José María Aznar	Gloria Macapagal-Arroyo		
Ignacio Sagaz Temprano	January 10, 2003	January 12, 2007	José María Aznar	Gloria Macapagal-Arroyo		
Luis Arias Romero	January 12, 2007	January 7, 2011	José Luis Rodríguez Zapatero	Gloria Macapagal-Arroyo		
Jorge Domecq	January 21, 2011	March 21, 2014	José Luis Rodríguez Zapatero	Benigno S. Aquino III		
Luis Antonio Calvo Castaño	June 6, 2014	August 24, 2018	Mariano Rajoy	Benigno S. Aquino III		
Jorge Moragas	October 1, 2018	September 4, 2022	Pedro Sánchez	Rodrigo R. Duterte		
Miguel Utray Delgado	September 5, 2022	September 30, 2026	Pedro Sánchez	Ferdinand R. Marcos Jr.	Presentation of credentials on October 13, 2022.	
Xavier Martí Martí	September 30, 2026	present	Pedro Sánchez	Ferdinand R. Marcos Jr.		

== See also ==
- Foreign relations of the Philippines
- Foreign relations of Spain
- List of ambassadors of the Philippines to Spain
