= List of ambassadors of Spain to Malaysia =

Ambassador of Spain to Malaysia
- Coat of arms of Spain
- Incumbent; Sergio Farré Salvá since 30 June 2026
- Ministry of Foreign Affairs; Secretariat of State for Foreign Affairs
- Style: The Most Excellent
- Residence: Kuala Lumpur
- Nominator: The Foreign Minister
- Appointer: The Monarch
- Term length: At the government's pleasure
- Inaugural holder: Emilio Beladiez Navarro
- Formation: 1967
- Website: Mission of Spain to Malaysia

The ambassador of Spain to Malaysia is the official representative of the Kingdom of Spain to Malaysia. It is also accredited to Brunei.

Spain and Malasya established diplomatic relations on 12 May 1967 and that same month Spain founded the Spanish embassy in Kuala Lumpur, with residence in Bangkok, Thailand. The first resident ambassador was appointed in 1986 and, since then, it also managed the relations with Brunei.

== Jurisdiction ==
- Malaysia: With residence in Kuala Lumpur, Malaysia is the main jurisdiction of the Embassy. Consular affairs are directly managed by the Consular Section of the embassy, although it is supported by an honorary consulate in Kota Kinabalu.

The ambassador is also accredited to:

- Brunei: Both nations established diplomatic relations in 1984. Consular protection in the country is provided by the Embassy in Kuala Lumpur.

== List of ambassadors to Malaysia ==
This list was compiled using the work "History of the Spanish Diplomacy" by the Spanish historian and diplomat Miguel Ángel Ochoa Brun. The work covers up to the year 2000, so the rest is based on appointments published in the Boletín Oficial del Estado or in news media.

No.	Name	Term
1	Emilio Beladiez Navarro (Note: Resident in Bangkok, Thailand.)	1967–1969
2	Carlos Fernández de Henestrosa y Le Motheux; Marquess of Villadarías and of the Vera	1969–1972
3	Mariano Sanz Briz	1972–1975
4	Antonio Cirera y Prim	1975–1977
5	Nicolás Revenga Domínguez	1978–1986
6	Roberto Bermúdez Ruiz (Note: Accredited to Brunei.)	1986–1991
7	Manuel Alabart	1992–1996
8	Carles Casajuana	1996–2001
9	Álvaro Iranzo Gutiérrez	2001–2004
10	Germán Bejarano García	2004–2007
11	José Ramón Barañano Fernández	2007–2011
12	María Bassols Delgado	2011–2014
13	Carlos Domínguez Díaz	2014–2018
14	José Miguel Corvinos	2018–2022
15	José Luis Pardo Cuerdo	2022–2026
16	Sergio Farré Salvá	2026–pres.
