= List of ambassadors of Spain to Indonesia =

Ambassador of Spain to Indonesia
- Coat of arms of Spain
- Incumbent; Bernardo de Sicart Escoda since 16 July 2025
- Ministry of Foreign Affairs; Secretariat of State for Foreign Affairs
- Style: The Most Excellent
- Residence: Jakarta
- Nominator: The Foreign Minister
- Appointer: The Monarch
- Term length: At the government's pleasure
- Inaugural holder: José Pérez del Arco y Rodríguez
- Formation: 1967
- Website: Mission of Spain to Indonesia

The ambassador of Spain to Indonesia is the official representative of the Kingdom of Spain to the Republic of Indonesia. It is also accredited to the Democratic Republic of Timor-Leste.

Indonesia and Spain established diplomatic relations in February 1958. In 1967, Spain appointed the first ambassador, resident in Manila. The first resident ambassador was appointed in 1972.

== Jurisdiction ==
- Indonesia: Diplomatic relations between both nations are managed through the respective ambassadors. The Consular Section of the Embassy provides consular services to the entire country, and an honorary consulate is located in Seminyak, close to Denpasar.

Also, the ambassador to Indonesia is accredited to:

- Timor-Leste: Spain recognized and established diplomatic relations with Timor on 20 May 2002. The president of the Senate, Esperanza Aguirre, led the Spanish delegation to the independence festivities. The Embassy in Jakarta is responsible for consular issues in the country, although there is an honorary consulate in Dili.

In the past, the ambassador to Indonesia also managed the diplomatic and consular relations with Singapore (1991–2003).

== List of ambassadors ==
Ambassador		Term	Nominated by	Appointed by	Accredited to
1	José Pérez del Arco y Rodríguez (Note: Resident in Manila.)	19 June 1967 – 7 March 1970 (2 years, 261 days)	Fernando María Castiella	Francisco Franco	Suharto
2	Víctor Sánchez-Mesas y Juste	5 February 1972 – 5 May 1977 (5 years, 70 days)	Gregorio López-Bravo	Francisco Franco	Suharto
3	Alberto Pascual Villar	5 May 1977 – 1 March 1982 (4 years, 300 days)	The Marquess of Oreja	Juan Carlos I	Suharto
4	Eugenio Bregolat y Obiols	1 March 1982 – 23 December 1986 (4 years, 297 days)	José Pedro Pérez-Llorca	Juan Carlos I	Suharto
5	Antonio Acebal y Monfort	18 March 1987 – 29 July 1989 (4 years, 364 days)	Francisco Fernández Ordóñez	Juan Carlos I	Suharto
6	Leopoldo Stampa Piñeiro (Note: Accredited to Singapore.)	29 July 1989 – 5 May 1993 (3 years, 280 days)	Francisco Fernández Ordóñez	Juan Carlos I	Suharto
7	Antonio Sánchez Jara	27 July 1993 – 17 May 1997 (3 years, 292 days)	Javier Solana	Juan Carlos I	Suharto
8	Antonio Segura Morís	17 May 1997 – 22 December 2001 (4 years, 219 days)	Abel Matutes	Juan Carlos I	Suharto
9	Dámaso de Lario (Note: Accredited to Singapore and Timor-Leste.)	22 December 2001 – 28 April 2007 (5 years, 127 days)	Josep Piqué	Juan Carlos I	Megawati Sukarnoputri
10	Aurora Bernáldez (Note: Accredited to Timor-Leste.)	28 April 2007 – 18 September 2010 (3 years, 143 days)	Miguel Ángel Moratinos	Juan Carlos I	Susilo Bambang Yudhoyono
11	Rafael Conde de Saro	16 October 2010 – 22 February 2014 (3 years, 129 days)	Miguel Ángel Moratinos	Juan Carlos I	Susilo Bambang Yudhoyono
12	Francisco José Viqueira Niel	22 February 2014 – 10 December 2016 (2 years, 292 days)	José Manuel García-Margallo	Juan Carlos I	Susilo Bambang Yudhoyono
13	José María Matrés Manso	25 February 2017 – 6 October 2021 (4 years, 223 days)	Alfonso Dastis	Felipe VI	Joko Widodo
14	Francisco de Asís Aguilera Aranda	6 October 2021 – 16 July 2025 (3 years, 283 days)	José Manuel Albares	Felipe VI	Joko Widodo
15	Bernardo de Sicart Escoda	16 July 2025 – present (1 year, 53 days)	José Manuel Albares	Felipe VI	Prabowo Subianto

== See also ==
- Indonesia–Spain relations
