= Carlos Abella y Ramallo =

Spanish diplomat

Carlos Abella y Ramallo (13 April 1934 – 12 August 2014) was a Spanish diplomat whose career with the Ministry of Foreign Affairs spanned forty years until his retirement in 2004. Abella served as the Ambassador of Spain to Kenya, dual accredited to Uganda, Madagascar and Somalia, from 1987 to 1991 and Ambassador to the Holy See from 1997 until 2004.

Abella died on 12 August 2014, at the age of 80.
