= Ángel Sagaz Zubelzu =

Spanish diplomat (1933–1974)

Ambassador of Spain to Egypt Accredited to Somalia, Sudan, Yemen and South Yemen
- In office 1966–1972

Ambassador of Spain to the United States
- In office 7 March 1972 – 6 May 1974
- Preceded by: Jaime Arguelles
- Succeeded by: Joaquin Cervino

Personal details
- Born: 1 March 1913 Madrid, Spain
- Died: 6 May 1974 (aged 61) Jaén, Spain
- Spouse: Ursula Zinsel Steeger de Sagaz (m. 1956)
- Children: 5
- Education: Diplomatic School of Spain

Ángel Sagaz Zubelzu (1 March 1913 – 6 May 1974) was a Spanish diplomat. As Ambassador of Spain to Egypt, Sagaz's actions helped to free more than 1,500 Jews who were imprisoned by the Egyptian government and evacuate them from the country amidst the Egyptian government's campaign of intimidation and harassment after its defeat in the Six-Day War in 1967.

== Early life ==
Ángel Sagaz Zubelzu was born in Madrid on 1 March 1913. He earned a graduate degree in law, then completed training at the Diplomatic School of Spain.

== Diplomatic career ==
He entered service as a career diplomat in the Spanish Ministry of Foreign Affairs (MFA) in 1943. Early in his career, Sagaz was posted to Ottawa, Stockholm, and Helsinki. From 1953 to 1958, he was posted in Washington, D.C. He was director of the MFA's North America and Canada desk from 1960 to 1964. From 1964 through 1966, he was Director-General for North America. In 1966, Sagaz became the Spanish Ambassador to Egypt in Cairo.

=== Ambassador to Egypt and Operation Pasaporte 128 ===
In the aftermath of Egypt's participation and decisive defeat in the Six-Day War, fought between Israel and a coalition of Arab states (primarily Egypt, Syria, and Jordan) in June 1967, the Egyptian government began a campaign of intimidation and harassment of Egypt's Jewish population. The Egyptian police began to detain Jews, trying, in general, to have one member of each Jewish family in prison. Most of the Jewish community's men were arrested. Most of these were imprisoned in the Tora Prison south of Cairo, a prison in Abu Zaabal, a suburb to the north of Cairo, and a women's prison in El Qantara in the Nile Delta.

The Spanish embassy became involved to deal with the consular needs of Egyptian Jews who had a Spanish passport. Sagaz appealed to Egyptian police, the Egyptian Ministry of Interior, and Egyptian President Gamal Abdel Nasser himself for the release and granting of permission for the Jews to leave Egypt. Sagaz argued that the Jews in Egypt held Spanish citizenship by virtue of the decree issued by former Spanish dictator Primo de Rivera in December 1924 "on the granting of Spanish nationality by naturalization letter to protected of Spanish origin". Fellow Spanish diplomat Ángel Sanz Briz had used the same tactic to provide Spanish passports to more than 5,000 Jews in German-occupied Hungary during the Holocaust. Sagaz emphasized, as a ploy, that he did not believe that Egypt was discriminating for reasons of race or religion, but was taking prudent steps during wartime. He also pointed to the fact that Spain had never recognized Israel as proof of his country's friendship with the Arab world.

The Egyptian government agreed to the Jews' release, with two conditions. First, the freed Jews were to maintain absolute silence about their experience in prison, so that they could not be used as propaganda against Nasser. Second, they were not to immediately go to Israel. Between 1967 and 1970, as many as 1,500 Jews, consisting of more than 615 families, left Egypt due to the efforts of Sagaz and his wife.

The first tranche of Jews departed from the Alexandria Port on the Spanish ships Benidorm and Benicarló and traveled to Marseille, Genoa, or Barcelona. The Spanish government paid for the trip. Sagaz would personally pick up the Jews at the prison, sign their passports, and drive them in a car with diplomatic license plates to Alexandria. The second group left on regular Air France flights, averaging four people per day, on tickets paid for by global Jewish organizations such as HIAS. According to the testimony of some of the Jews, they were not immediately informed of the involvement of the Spanish embassy in Cairo, only handed Spanish passports shortly before the flight to France. The Spanish passports were valid for only 2 years and could not be renewed.

As Spanish ambassador, Sagaz also represented the interests of the United States after the severing of relations between Egypt and the U.S. after the war. The efforts of Sagaz and the Spanish embassy were revealed by the American press in 1968.

=== Ambassador to the United States ===
Sagaz served in Cairo until 1972, when he became Ambassador of Spain to the United States on 7 March 1972.

== Death ==
Due to illness, Sagaz temporarily returned to Spain on 16 April 1974, flying on a U.S. Air Force plane provided by President Richard Nixon. He died on 6 May 1974, in Jaén.

== Personal ==
Sagaz spoke Spanish, English, and French. He married his wife Ursula Zinsel Steeger de Sagaz in Washington in 1956 and had five sons: Jose, Gabriel, Juan Carlos, Manuel, and Santiago.
