= List of ambassadors of Spain to Namibia =

Ambassador of Spain to Namibia
- Coat of arms of Spain
- Incumbent; Francisco Javier Pagalday Gastelurrutia since 16 July 2025
- Ministry of Foreign Affairs; Secretariat of State for Foreign Affairs
- Style: The Most Excellent
- Residence: Windhoek
- Nominator: The Foreign Minister
- Appointer: The Monarch
- Term length: At the government's pleasure
- Inaugural holder: Carlos Sánchez de Boado y de la Válgoma
- Formation: 1990
- Website: Mission of Spain to Namibia

The ambassador of Spain to Namibia is the official representative of the Kingdom of Spain to the Republic of Namibia. It is also accredited to the Republic of Botswana and the Southern African Development Community (SADC).

Before Namibia's independence, Spain established an "Office for Diplomatic Observation" in Windhoek and participated in the United Nations Transition Assistance Group. After the approval of the Constitution of Namibia, the Council of Ministers of Spain agreed to recognized and establish diplomatic relations with Namibia on 2 March 1990. Spain established its Embassy in the country's capital on 20 March 1990, the day before the aforementioned Constitution came into effect. Carlos Sánchez de Boado y de la Válgoma, who led the Office for Diplomatic Observation, was appointed as first ambassador of Spain to Namibia in April 1990.

== Jurisdiction ==
- Namibia: The Embassy of Spain in Windhoek manages Namibia–Spain relations and offers consular protection to Spaniards in the country, as well as in Botswana. Spain also has an honorary consulate in Lüderitz, which serves the ǁKaras Region.

The ambassador to Namibia is also accredited to:

- Botswana: Both nations established diplomatic relations on 29 April 1981. The ambassador to Zimbabwe was responsible for this country until 1995, when the ambassador to Namibia assumed the role. Spain has an honorary consulate in Gaborone and an honorary vice-consulate in Maun.
- Southern African Development Community,

== List of ambassadors ==
Ambassador		Term	Nominated by	Appointed by	Accredited to
1	Carlos Sánchez de Boado	21 April 1990 – 23 July 1994 (4 years, 93 days)	Francisco Fernández Ordóñez	Juan Carlos I	Sam Nujoma
2	Germán Zurita y Sáenz de Navarrete (Note: Accredited to Botswana.)	23 July 1994 – 6 June 1998 (3 years, 318 days)	Javier Solana	Juan Carlos I	Sam Nujoma
3	Eduardo Garrigues López-Chicheri	6 June 1998 – 16 October 2001 (3 years, 132 days)	Abel Matutes	Juan Carlos I	Sam Nujoma
4	Francisco Javier Pérez-Griffo y de Vides	27 October 2001 – 5 March 2005 (3 years, 129 days)	Josep Piqué	Juan Carlos I	Sam Nujoma
5	María Victoria Scola Pliego	5 March 2005 – 2 August 2008 (3 years, 150 days)	Miguel Ángel Moratinos	Juan Carlos I	Hifikepunye Pohamba
6	Alfonso Barnuevo	9 September 2008 – 15 October 2011 (3 years, 36 days)	Miguel Ángel Moratinos	Juan Carlos I	Hifikepunye Pohamba
7	María del Carmen Díez Orejas	15 October 2011 – 11 July 2015 (3 years, 269 days)	Trinidad Jiménez	Juan Carlos I	Hifikepunye Pohamba
8	Concepción Figuerola Santos	11 July 2015 – 21 July 2018 (3 years, 10 days)	José Manuel García-Margallo	Felipe VI	Hage Geingob
9	Antonio Javier Romera Pintor	25 August 2018 – 6 July 2022 (3 years, 315 days)	Josep Borrell	Felipe VI	Hage Geingob
10	Alberto Pablo de la Calle García	6 July 2022 – 16 July 2025 (3 years, 10 days)	José Manuel Albares	Felipe VI	Hage Geingob
11	Francisco Javier Pagalday	16 July 2025 – present (1 year, 103 days)	José Manuel Albares	Felipe VI	Netumbo Nandi-Ndaitwah
