= List of ambassadors of Spain to Bosnia and Herzegovina =

Ambassador of Spain to Bosnia and Herzegovina
- Coat of arms of Spain
- Incumbent; María Molina Álvarez de Toledo since 31 July 2024
- Ministry of Foreign Affairs; Secretariat of State for the European Union
- Style: The Most Excellent
- Residence: Sarajevo
- Nominator: The Foreign Minister
- Appointer: The Monarch
- Term length: At the government's pleasure
- Inaugural holder: Miguel Ángel Ochoa Brun
- Formation: 1993
- Website: Mission of Spain to Bosnia and Herzegovina

The ambassador of Spain to Bosnia and Herzegovina is the official representative of the Kingdom of Spain to Bosnia and Herzegovina.

Spain recognized Bosnia and Herzegovina's independence on 14 December 1992 and actively participated in the Bosnian War. Spain's role in supporting Bosnia and Herzegovina was rewarded with the appointment of Carlos Westendorp as high representative in 1997. Also, from 1998 to 1999, Spain had an additional ambassador (an ambassador-at-large) in the country, responsible for the relations with the Office of the High Representative. In October 2010, Spain end its main military operations in Bosnia after 18 years, although it continues to provide military advice and training through the European Union's Operation Althea.

From 1993 to 1997 the ambassador to Bosnia was resident in Vienna, Austria and, since then, a resident embassy was established in Sarajevo.

== List of ambassadors ==
Ambassador		Term	Nominated by	Appointed by	Accredited to
1	Miguel Ángel Ochoa Brun (Note: Resident in Vienna.)	27 October 1993 – 20 April 1996 (2 years, 176 days)	Javier Solana	Juan Carlos I	Alija Izetbegović
2	Ricardo Díez-Hochleitner Rodríguez	8 February 1997 – 21 November 1997 (286 days)	Abel Matutes	Juan Carlos I	Alija Izetbegović
3	José Ángel López Jorrin	21 November 1997 – 10 March 2001 (3 years, 109 days)	Abel Matutes	Juan Carlos I	Alija Izetbegović
4	Rafael Valle Garagorri	2 June 2001 – 21 January 2006 (4 years, 233 days)	Josep Piqué	Juan Carlos I	Jozo Križanović
5	José María Castroviejo y Bolíbar	21 January 2006 – 15 November 2008 (2 years, 299 days)	Miguel Ángel Moratinos	Juan Carlos I	Ivo Miro Jović
6	Alejandro Alvargonzález	15 November 2008 – 14 January 2012 (3 years, 60 days)	Miguel Ángel Moratinos	Juan Carlos I	Nebojša Radmanović
7	María Aurora Mejía Errasquín	24 March 2012 – 24 March 2015 (3 years, 0 days)	José Manuel García-Margallo	Juan Carlos I	Bakir Izetbegović
8	Juan Bosco Giménez Soriano	24 March 2015 – 12 May 2018 (3 years, 49 days)	José Manuel García-Margallo	Felipe VI	Mladen Ivanić
9	José María Valdemoro Giménez	12 May 2018 – 24 March 2021 (2 years, 305 days)	Alfonso Dastis	Felipe VI	Bakir Izetbegović
10	María Teresa Lizaranzu Perinat	21 July 2021 – 31 July 2024 (3 years, 10 days)	José Manuel Albares	Felipe VI	Željko Komšić
11	María Molina Álvarez de Toledo	31 July 2024 – present (2 years, 88 days)	José Manuel Albares	Felipe VI	Denis Bećirović

== See also ==
- Bosnia and Herzegovina–Spain relations
