= List of ambassadors of Spain to Slovenia =

Ambassador of Spain to Slovenia
- Coat of arms of Spain
- Incumbent; Javier Herrera García-Canturri since 3 July 2024
- Ministry of Foreign Affairs; Secretariat of State for the European Union
- Style: The Most Excellent
- Residence: Ljubljana
- Nominator: The Foreign Minister
- Appointer: The Monarch
- Term length: At the government's pleasure
- Inaugural holder: Miguel Ángel Ochoa Brun
- Formation: 1992
- Website: Mission of Spain to Slovenia

The ambassador of Spain to Slovenia is the official representative of the Kingdom of Spain to the Republic of Slovenia.

Spain recognized the new Slovenian state in 1992 and entrusted diplomatic relations to its ambassador in Austria. In June 1998, the Spanish government created a resident embassy in Ljubljana that started functioning in early 1999.

== Lists of ambassadors ==
This list was compiled using the work "History of the Spanish Diplomacy" by the Spanish historian and diplomat Miguel Ángel Ochoa Brun. The work covers up to the year 2000, so the rest is based on appointments published in the Boletín Oficial del Estado or news media.

Name	Rank	Term
The Ambassador to Austria		1992–1999
Luis Felipe Fernández de la Peña	Ambassador	1998–2002
Pablo Zaldívar Miquelarena	Ambassador	2002–2005
Carmen Fontes Muñoz	Ambassador	2005–2009
Anunciada Fernández de Córdova	Ambassador	2009–2015
José Luis de la Peña Vela	Ambassador	2015–2020
Juan de Arístegui Laborde	Ambassador	2020–2024
Javier Herrera García-Canturri	Ambassador	2024–pres.

== See also ==
- Slovenia–Spain relations
