= List of ambassadors of Spain to Turkey =

Ambassador of Spain to Turkey
- Coat of arms of Spain

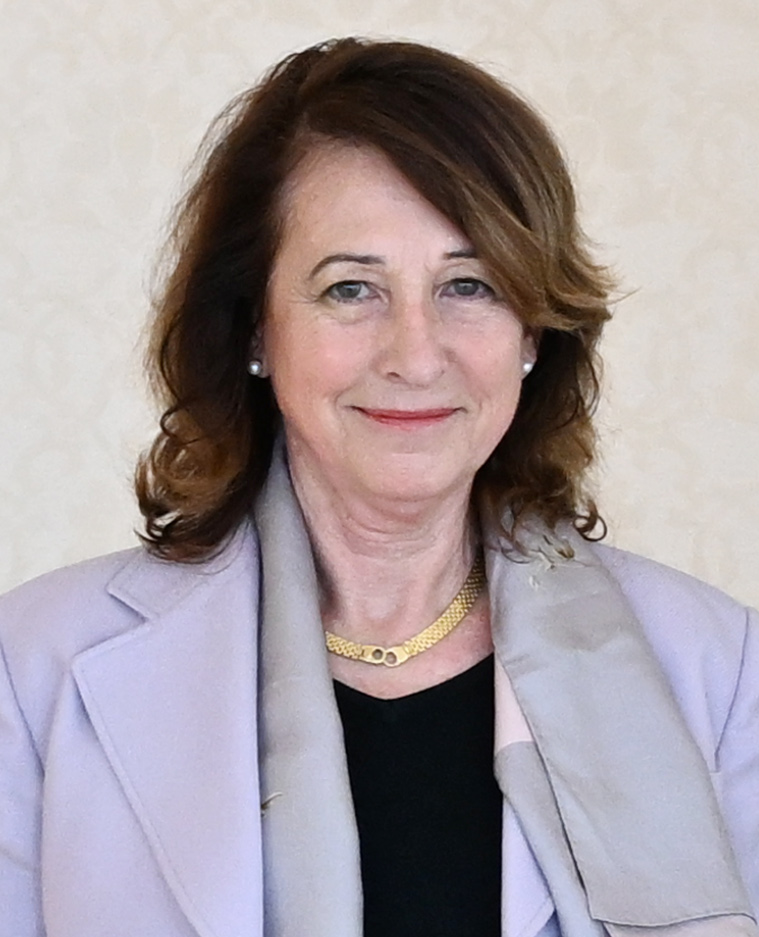
- Incumbent; Cristina Latorre Sancho since 27 March 2024
- Ministry of Foreign Affairs; Secretariat of State for the European Union
- Style: The Most Excellent
- Residence: Ankara
- Nominator: The Foreign Minister
- Appointer: The Monarch
- Term length: At the government's pleasure
- Inaugural holder: Alfonso Fiscowich y Gullón
- Formation: 1951
- Website: Mission of Spain to Turkey

The ambassador of Spain to Turkey is the official representative of the Kingdom of Spain to the Republic of Turkey. It is also accredited to the Republic of Azerbaijan and the Republic of Georgia.

The Ottoman and Spanish empires had diplomatic contacts from the 16th century onwards and, although representatives with the rank of ambassador were sent, these were not ambassadors in the modern sense, but temporary ambassadors to negotiate a specific matter or resolve a dispute.

Following the Treaty of Peace, Friendship and Trade between both empires, signed in Constantinople on 14 September 1782, permanent diplomatic relations were established. Spain was allowed to establish consulates "in all ports and convenient maritime locations within the Ottoman domain". Thanks to this authorization, Juan de Bouligny, minister to Turkey, created a general consulate in Smyrna, consulates in Thessaloniki, Cyprus and Aleppo, and vice-consulates in Alexandria, Arta and Athens. Finally, in 1951 the legation to Turkey was elevated to the rank of ambassador.

== Jurisdiction ==
- Turkey: The Embassy of Spain in Ankara manages Spain–Turkey relations. In addition, Spain has a Consulate-General in Istanbul and honorary consuls in Antalya, İskenderun, İzmir, İzmit and Nevşehir.

The ambassador is also accredited to:

- Azerbaijan: Diplomatic relations between the two countries were established on 11 February 1992. Spain has a chargé d'affaires in Baku.
- Georgia: Georgia and Spain maintain diplomatic relations since 1992. In addition to the ambassador resident in Ankara, Spain has a chargé d'affaires and an honorary consul in Tbilisi.

In the past, this position served as ambassador to Afghanistan (1962–1973), Greece (1892–1914) and Iran (1943–1954).

== List of ambassadors ==
This list was compiled using the work "History of the Spanish Diplomacy" by the Spanish historian and diplomat Miguel Ángel Ochoa Brun. The work covers up to the year 2000, so the rest is based on appointments published in the Boletín Oficial del Estado.

Name	Rank	Term
García de Loaysa	Ambassador	1519
Leonardo de Nogarolo	Ambassador	1532
Jerónimo de Zara	Ambassador	1534
Cornelis de Schepper	Ambassador	1533–1534
Juan Gallego	Envoy (to Barbarossa)	1540
Gerard Veltwyck	Ambassador	1544–1547
Ogier Ghiselin de Busbecq	Envoy	1555
Ogier Ghiselin de Busbecq	Envoy	1563
Francisco de Francis	Envoy	1559
Aurelio Santa Cruz	Secret agent	1564–1584
Juan de Marliano	Envoy	1568
Carlos Ryn	Ambassador	1569
Miguel Cernovici	Secret agent	c.1573
Joaquín de Uceda	Secret agent	1575
Martín de Acuña	Envoy	1577
Juan de Marliano	Envoy	1578–1583
Allegretto Allegretti	Diplomatic agent	1650
Santiago de Boissimene	Envoy	1717–1718
Wilhelm Moritz; Count of Ludolf	Minister	1760–1767
Juan de Bouligny	Minister	1779–1793
Gabriel de Aristizábal y Espinosa	Extraordinary Envoy	1784
José de Bouligny	Chargé d'affaires	1793–1799
Ignacio María del Corral y Aguirre	Minister	1800–1805
Julián del Corral	Chargé d'affaires	1805
José Martínez de Hervás y de Madrid; Marquess of Almenara	Minister	1805–1808
José de Endériz y López de Angulo	Chargé d'affaires	1808–1809
José Rodrigo de Carratalá	Chargé d'affaires	1809
Constantino Deval (Note: Since 1809 representing the government of Joseph Bonaparte.)	Chargé d'affaires	1809–1814
Juan Jabat Aztal	Minister	1809–1819
Francisco Javier Pérez	Chargé d'affaires	1819–1821
Francisco Cea Bermúdez	Minister	1821–1823
Francisco Javier Pérez	Chargé d'affaires	1824
Luis del Castillo Estévez	Chargé d'affaires	1824–1828
Luis del Castillo Estévez	Minister	1828–1829
Andrés Villalba	Minister	1829–1831
Juan Vial	Minister	1831–1833
Antonio López de Córdoba	Minister	1833–1847
Gerardo de Souza	Minister	1847–1852
José Neviet	Minister	1852–1853
Antonio Riquelme	Minister	1853–1854
Gerardo de Souza	Minister	1854–1861
Juan Tomás Comyn y Martínez	Minister	1862–1863
Eduardo Sancho	Minister	1863–1864
Pedro Sorela y Maury	Minister	1864
Rafael Jabat	Minister	1864–1865
The Duke of Bivona	Minister	1865–1867
Francisco de Cea Bermúdez y Colombí; Count of Colombí	Chargé d'affaires	1867–1868
The Marquess of Zarco	Chargé d'affaires	1868–1869
Edmundo Tirel y Gómez de las Casas; Marquess of the Ulagares	Minister	1869–1873
José Antonio de Aguilar	Chargé d'affaires	1869–1872
Ángel Ruata	Chargé d'affaires	1872
Miguel Azara	Chargé d'affaires	1873
Guillermo Crespo y Crespo	Minister	1873–1875
Augusto Conte Lerdo de Tejada	Minister	1875–1878
Antonio Mantilla de los Ríos; Marquess of Villamantilla	Minister	1878–1881
Juan Antonio Rascón y Navarro; Count of Rascón	Minister	1881–1883
The Count of Coello de Portugal	Minister	1884–1885
Guillermo Crespo	Minister	1886–1888
The Marquess of Bendaña	Minister	1888–1890
Angel Ruata y Sichar (Note: Accredited to Greece.)	Minister	1890–1893
Francisco Rafael Figuera	Minister	1893–1894
The Marquess of Potestad-Fornari	Chargé d'affaires	1894–1896
The Marquess of Villa-Urrutia	Minister	1896–1897
José María Bernaldo de Quirós; Marquess of Campo Sagrado	Minister	1897–1909
Pedro de Prat y Agacino; Marquess of Prat de Nantouillet	Minister	1909–1913
Germán María de Ory y Morey	Minister	1913–1914
Julián María del Arroyo y Moret	Minister	1914–1918
Juan Servert y Vest	Minister	1918–1932
Juan María Arístegui y Vidaurre	Minister	1932
Julio Palencia y Álvarez-Tubau (Note: Representing the Junta Técnica del Estado and the first government of Francisco Franco during the Spanish Civil War.)	Chargé d'affaires	1935–1939
Ricardo Begoña Calderón (Note: Representative of the Republican government.)	Minister	1937–1939
Carlos López-Dóriga y Salaverría	Minister	1939–1940
Pedro Prat y Soutzo	Chargé d'affaires	1940–1941
José María Doussinague	Chargé d'affaires	1941–1943
Antonio Gullón y Gómez	Chargé d'affaires	1943
The Count of Casa Rojas	Minister	1943–1946
Alfonso Fiscowich y Gullón	Minister	1946–1951
Alfonso Fiscowich y Gullón	Ambassador	1951–1954
José Ruiz de Arana y Bauer; Duke of Baena	Ambassador	1954–1956
Juan Teixidor y Sánchez	Ambassador	1956–1962
Emilio García Gómez (Note: Accredited to Afghanistan.)	Ambassador	1962–1970
Luis García de Llera y Rodríguez	Ambassador	1970–1973
Emilio Garrigues y Díaz-Cañabate	Ambassador	1973–1975
Guillermo Nadal Blanes	Ambassador	1975–1976
Gabriel Cañadas Nouvilas	Ambassador	1976–1977
Santiago Martínez Caro	Ambassador	1977–1984
Ramón Villanueva Etcheverría	Ambassador	1984–1990
Javier Villacieros Machimbarrena; Count of Villacieros	Ambassador	1990–1993
Carlos Carderera Soler	Ambassador	1993–1996
Jesús Atienza Serna (Note: Accredited to Azerbaijan.)	Ambassador	1996–2000
Manuel de la Cámara Hermoso	Ambassador	2000–2004
Luis Felipe Fernández de la Peña	Ambassador	2004–2008
Joan Clos	Ambassador	2008–2010
Cristóbal González-Aller Jurado (Note: Accredited to Azerbaijan and Georgia.)	Ambassador	2010–2014
Rafael Mendívil Peydro	Ambassador	2014–2018
Juan González-Barba Pera	Ambassador	2018–2020
Francisco Javier Hergueta Garnica	Ambassador	2020–2024
Cristina Latorre Sancho	Ambassador	2024–pres.

== See also ==
- Spain–Turkey relations
