= United Nations Security Council Resolution 2331 =

UN Security Council Resolution 2331
- UN emblem
- Date: 20 December 2016
- Meeting no.: 7847
- Code: S/RES/2331 (Document)
- Subject: on trafficking in persons in armed conflicts
- Voting summary: 15 voted for; None voted against; None abstained
- Result: Adopted

Security Council composition
- Permanent members: China; France; Russia; United Kingdom; United States
- Non-permanent members: Angola; Egypt; Japan; Malaysia; New Zealand; Senegal; Spain; Ukraine; Uruguay; Venezuela

United Nations Security Council Resolution 2331 was unanimously adopted by the United Nations Security Council on December 20, 2016. Members of the Security Council condemned, in the strongest terms, all instances of human trafficking in areas affected by armed conflicts. The resolution stresses that human trafficking undermines the rule of law and contributes to other forms of transnational organized crime, by which terrorist organizations can earn money, strengthen their ranks, and acquire sex and work slaves. The Islamic State, in particular, has also attempted to destroy religious and ethnic minorities such as the Yezidis of Iraq.

== Background ==
The issue of human trafficking was debated that entire day. The United Kingdom suggested that measures should be taken globally such as gathering evidence of the crimes that IS has committed in Iraq. Secretary-General Ban Ki-moon called it a global problem and said that women, children, and refugees in conflict areas were the most vulnerable people in this case. Mr. Moon depicted examples. He mentioned the Nigerian terrorist group, Boko Haram, who turned women and girls into sex slaves, and the Islamic State, who imprisoned girls kidnapped from Yezidi religious minority in Iraq and sold them in slave markets.

His special representative for sexual violence in conflict situations, Zainab Hawa Bangura, said that a number of extremist groups used sexual violence as a tactic to frighten the population. Her office defined six conditions to determine the case:

- It is done systematically by extremists and terror groups;
- It is deliberately used to spread terror;
- Terrorism is financed by it;
- Political, ethnic and religious groups are targeted;
- It is a strategy to radicalize, recruit, retain or reward fighters;
- It is part of an ideology to control women's body, sexuality and reproduction;

Yazidi women's rights activist Ameena Saeed Hasan said that IS had abducted and sold more than 6,000 Yazidi women and children at slave markets, under the motto that the virginity of the girls had become the "gateway to paradise" (for IS fighters). She complained about Islamic leaders’ silence and wondered why no military action was taken against the group. The goodwill ambassador for the dignity of survivors of human trafficking, Nadia Murad Base Taha, has declared that more than 3,000 Yazidi were still being held in the custody of IS. She asked why there was no investigation and there was no court to prosecute perpetrators.

== Content ==
In 2000, in the United Nations Convention against Transnational Organized Crime, a definition of "trafficking in human beings" was agreed for the first time, and a framework was set up to address it. The few countries that did not accede to this multilateral treaty were asked to do so and to take immediate measures against human trafficking. If human trafficking was done in conflict areas, the conflict could drag on and worsen. For the terrorist groups, such as the Islamic State, sexual violence against religious and ethnic minorities, linked to human trafficking, was part of the tactics, strategy and ideology to get money, power and members and to destroy communities. The Boko Haram, Al-Shabaab and Resistance Army groups also traded people for sexual slavery and forced labor. Countries were asked to build up expertise in knowledge of how funding and financing the terrorism through human trafficking is managed, to end up this cooperation between them and with the private sector. They were also encouraged to teach blue helmets to deal with human trafficking and sexual violence before they leave on a UN mission.

The UN Security Council considered introducing targeted sanctions against those involved in human trafficking and sexual violence in conflict areas. Their victims had to be considered victims of terrorism.
