= List of ambassadors of Spain to Egypt =

Ambassador of Spain to Egypt
- Coat of arms of Spain
- Incumbent; Sergio Román Carranza Förster since 24 September 2025
- Ministry of Foreign Affairs; Secretariat of State for Foreign Affairs
- Style: The Most Excellent
- Residence: Cairo
- Nominator: The Foreign Minister
- Appointer: The Monarch
- Term length: At the government's pleasure
- Inaugural holder: Alonso Caro y del Arroyo
- Formation: 1949
- Website: Mission of Spain to Egypt

The ambassador of Spain to Egypt is the official representative of the Kingdom of Spain to the Arab Republic of Egypt. As of 2026, the Embassy in Cairo is responsible for consular affairs regarding Yemen.

Before the unification of the Spanish kingdoms at the end of the 15th century, Castile and Aragon sent diplomatic missions to the Mamluk Sultanate. Also, at the beginning of the 16th century, the Catholic Monarchs sent Peter Martyr d'Anghiera to avoid reprisals from the Sultanate against the Christian population for the expulsion of the Muslims from the Peninsula.

Since 1893, Spain appointed diplomatic agents to the region and, once Egypt declared its independence from the United Kingdom, Spain established a legation in Cairo around 1925, appointing the first minister resident the following year. In 1949, this legation was elevated to the rank of embassy. From 1958 to 1971, this embassy served as main diplomatic representation to he United Arab Republic.

== List of ambassadors to Egypt ==
This list was compiled using the work "History of the Spanish Diplomacy" by the Spanish historian and diplomat Miguel Ángel Ochoa Brun. The work covers up to the year 2000, so the rest is based on appointments published in the Boletín Oficial del Estado.

Name	Rank	Term
Luis Polo de Bernabé	Diplomatic agent	1893–1894
Antonio de la Corte y Castañeira	Diplomatic agent	1894–1895
Federico Huesca y Madrid	Diplomatic agent	1895
Federico de Rojas y Alonso	Diplomatic agent	1896–1898
Antonio de Castro y Casaléiz	Diplomatic agent	1898–1899
Antonio de la Corte y Castañeira	Diplomatic agent	1899
Ricardo Larios y Segura	Diplomatic agent	1899–1905
Germán de Ory y Morey	Diplomatic agent	1905–1907
Fernando Osorio y Elola	Diplomatic agent	1907–1908
Pedro de Prat y Agacino, Marquess of Prat de Nantouillet	Diplomatic agent	1908–1909
Fernando Osorio y Elola	Diplomatic agent	1909–1912
Cristóbal Fernández-Vallín y Alfonso	Diplomatic agent	1912–1919
Silvio Fernández-Vallín y Alfonso	Diplomatic agent	1919–1926
Joaquín Carrillo de Albornoz y Faura, Marquess of Faura	Minister	1926–1929
Carlos López-Dóriga y Salaverría	Minister	1929–1931
José de Landecho y Allendesalazar	Minister	1931–1932
Alonso Caro y del Arroyo	Minister	1932–1937
César Daniel de Alarcón (Note: Representing the Republican government.)	Chargé d'affaires	1937
Gabriel Alomar Villalonga	Minister	1937–1939
Juan de las Bárcenas y de la Huerta	Chargé d'affaires	1939
Ángel Sanz Briz	Chargé d'affaires	1939–1941
Carlos de Miranda y Quartín, Count of Casa Miranda	Minister	1941–1947
Alonso Caro y del Arroyo	Minister	1947–1949
Alonso Caro y del Arroyo	Ambassador	1949–1950
Domingo de las Bárcenas y López-Mollinedo	Ambassador	1950–1953
José Fernández-Villaverde, Marquess de Santa Cruz	Ambassador	1953–1955
José del Castaño Cardona	Ambassador	1955–1958
José Felipe de Alcover y Sureda	Ambassador	1958–1962
Manuel Valdés Larrañaga, Marquess of Avella	Ambassador	1963–1964
Miguel María de Lojendio Irure	Ambassador	1964–1966
Ángel Sagaz Zubelzu	Ambassador	1966–1972
Manuel Alabart Miranda	Ambassador	1972–1976
Manuel Díez-Alegría	Ambassador	1976–1978
José Luis Flórez-Estrada y Ayala	Ambassador	1978–1981
Alberto López Herce	Ambassador	1981–1985
Carlos Fernández-Longoria	Ambassador	1985–1990
Eudaldo Mirapeix, Baron of Abella	Ambassador	1990–1995
Juan Alfonso Ortiz Ramos	Ambassador	1995–2000
Pedro López de Aguirrebengoa	Ambassador	2000–2006
Antonio López Martínez	Ambassador	2006–2010
Fidel Sendagorta Gómez del Campillo	Ambassador	2010–2014
Arturo Avello Díez del Corral	Ambassador	2014–2018
Ramón Gil-Casares	Ambassador	2018–2022
Álvaro Iranzo Gutiérrez	Ambassador	2022–2025
Sergio Román Carranza Förster	Ambassador	2025–pres.

== See also ==
- Egypt–Spain relations
