= Peter Gerstoft =

- Born: Denmark
- Citizenship: Danish, American
- Education: Technical University of Denmark; University of Western Ontario
- Known for: Geoacoustic inversion Seismic imaging Machine learning in physical systems
- Awards: Fellow, IEEE (2023); Member, American Geophysical Union (since 2004); Fellow, Acoustical Society of America (2003); Fulbright Scholar (1989–1990)
- Scientific career
- Fields: Ocean acoustics, Seismology, Signal processing
- Workplaces: Technical University of Denmark, Scripps Institution of Oceanography, University of California, San Diego

Peter Gerstoft is a Danish-American scientist and engineer specializing in ocean acoustics, seismology, and signal processing. He is currently a professor in the Department of Electrical and Photonics Engineering at the Technical University of Denmark. He was previously a Distinguished Data Scientist at the Scripps Institution of Oceanography at the University of California, San Diego and an adjunct professor in the Department of Electrical and Computer Engineering at UC San Diego.

== Education ==
Gerstoft received his MSc in engineering from the Technical University of Denmark in 1983 and another MSc from the University of Western Ontario in 1984. He completed his PhD in engineering at the Technical University of Denmark in 1986.

== Career ==
Gerstoft began his career in acoustics and vibrations at Odegaard & Danneskiold-Samsøe (1987–1992). He then served as a Senior Scientist at the NATO SACLANT Undersea Research Centre in La Spezia, Italy, from 1992 to 1997. Between 1999 and 2000, Gerstoft worked as a Senior Seismic Acoustic Officer with the Comprehensive Nuclear-Test-Ban Treaty Organization. He has been a Data Scientist at the Scripps Institution of Oceanography since 1997.

From 2013, he held an adjunct faculty position in Electrical and Computer Engineering at UC San Diego, where he taught courses on seismology, data assimilation, and machine learning for physical systems.

Gerstoft retired from UC San Diego in 2025 and accepted an appointment as Professor of Electrical and Photonics Engineering at the Technical University of Denmark in 2026.

== Research and contributions ==
Gerstoft's research focuses on environmental signal processing, with a particular emphasis on inversion methods, including their theoretical development, algorithmic implementation, and practical applications. In the 1990s, he investigated the use of nonlinear optimization and Bayesian approaches in acoustic inverse problems related to source localization and environmental parameter estimation. His work integrated physical propagation models with Bayesian sampling methods and a range of likelihood functions. These techniques have been applied to various data types, including vertical sensor arrays, single-sensor broadband data, and transmission loss measurements, and contributed to a general framework for inversion based on Gaussian assumptions.

He has also conducted research in machine learning and sparse signal processing, particularly in the context of sensor array data. This includes applications such as direction of arrival estimation and source localization, including for seismic events such as the 2011 Tōhoku earthquake and for ship tracking in ocean environments. His work on sparse Bayesian sequential methods and techniques for estimating Lagrange multipliers in constrained optimization problems has contributed to the development of adaptive and high-resolution signal processing techniques.

Gerstoft has applied supervised learning and deep neural networks to problems in physical acoustics, including source localization in ocean waveguides. He has also co-authored several review articles on the use of machine learning in acoustics and seismology.

== Honors ==
- Fulbright Scholar, Massachusetts Institute of Technology (1989–1990)
- Fellow, Acoustical Society of America (2003)
- Member, American Geophysical Union (since 2004)
- Senior Member, Institute of Electrical and Electronics Engineers (2018)
- Fellow, Institute of Electrical and Electronics Engineers (2023)

== Selected publications ==
=== Book ===
- Diachok, O., Caiti, A., Gerstoft, P., & Schmidt, H. (Eds.). Full Field Inversion Methods in Ocean and Seismo-Acoustics. Kluwer Academic Publishers, 1995.

=== Selected articles ===
- Gerstoft, P. (1994). "Inversion of seismo-acoustic data using genetic algorithms and a posteriori probability distributions". Journal of the Acoustical Society of America. 95 (2): 770–782. doi:10.1121/1.408467.
- Gerstoft, P., & Mecklenbrauker, C. F. (1998). "Ocean acoustic inversion with estimation of a posteriori probability distributions". Journal of the Acoustical Society of America. 104 (2): 808–819. doi:10.1121/1.423287.
- Sabra, K. G., Gerstoft, P., Roux, P., Kuperman, W. A., & Fehler, M. (2005). "Extracting time-domain Green's function estimates from ambient seismic noise". Geophysical Research Letters. 32, L03310.
- Xenaki, A., Gerstoft, P., & Mosegaard, K. (2014). "Compressive beamforming". Journal of the Acoustical Society of America. 136, 260–271.
- Niu, H., Reeves, D., & Gerstoft, P. (2017). "Source localization in an ocean waveguide using supervised machine learning". Journal of the Acoustical Society of America. 142, 1176–1188.
