= List of Brazilian diplomats =

This is a list of Brazilian diplomats.

- Baron of Rio Branco
- Viscount of Rio Branco
- Joaquim Nabuco
- José Maurício Bustani
- Luiz Martins de Souza Dantas
- Oswaldo Aranha
- Rubens Ricupero
- Rui Barbosa
- Walter Moreira Salles
- Antonio Patriota
- Roberto Azevedo, Director-General of WTO
- Maria Luiza Ribeiro Viotti
- Sérgio Vieira de Mello
