= International Dialogue on Underwater Munitions =

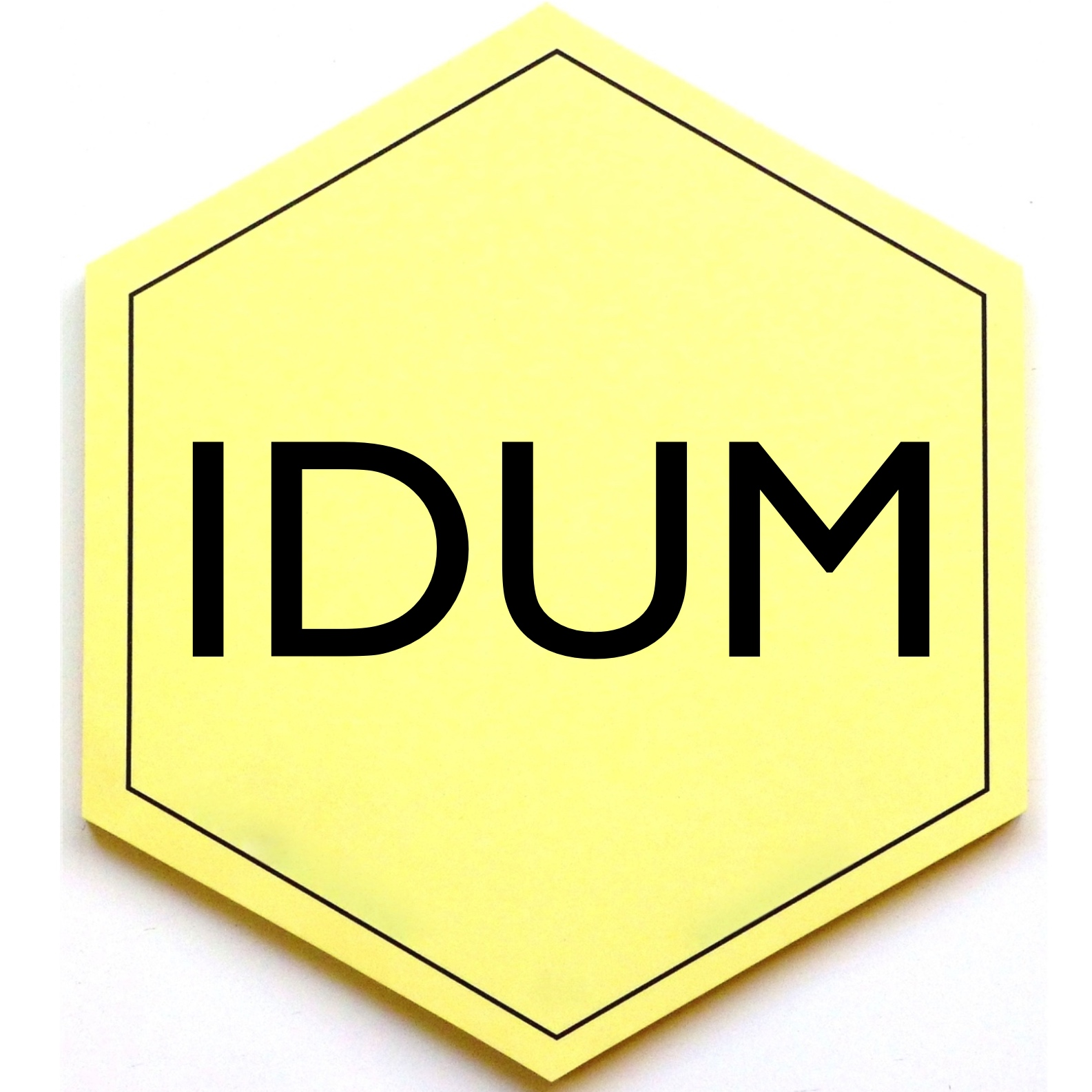
- Founded: 2004
- Founder: Terrance P. Long
- Purpose: Underwater Munitions
- Location: Niastraat 1, Utrecht, The Netherlands
- Region served: Worldwide
- Key people: Terrance P. Long (CEO & Chairman)
- Website: http://www.underwatermunitions.org

International Dialogues on Underwater Munitions (IDUM) is a non-governmental organization (NGO) that was founded in Canada in 2004 and established as a Dutch Foundation in The Hague, The Netherlands in 2014. The IDUM was founded by Terrance P. Long CPSM.SSM. CD., a retired Canadian Military Engineer with more than thirty years of experience, having served in Explosive Ordnance Disposal (EOD) Centre Chief, and demining expert all over the world. His expertise and passion for marine ecosystems led to the birth of IDUM.

IDUM is Accredited by:

- NATO Science for Peace and Security - MODUM Program, Sopot, Poland
- International Seabed Authority (ISA) for Law of the Sea, Kingston, Jamaica
- OSPAR Commission for the Protection of the North-East Atlantic Oceans, London, England
- HELCOM Helsinki Commission for the Protection of the Baltic Sea, Helsinki, Finland
- Organization for the Prohibition of Chemical Weapons (OPCW), Chemical Weapons Convention (CWC), The Hague, The Netherlands
- United Nations High-level Summits for Sustainable Development Goal 13 Climate Action, UN New York
- United Nations High-level Summits for Sustainable Development Goal 14 Life Below Water, UN New York
- United Nations Oceans Conferences, UN New York and Lisbon 2022

== Mission and activity ==
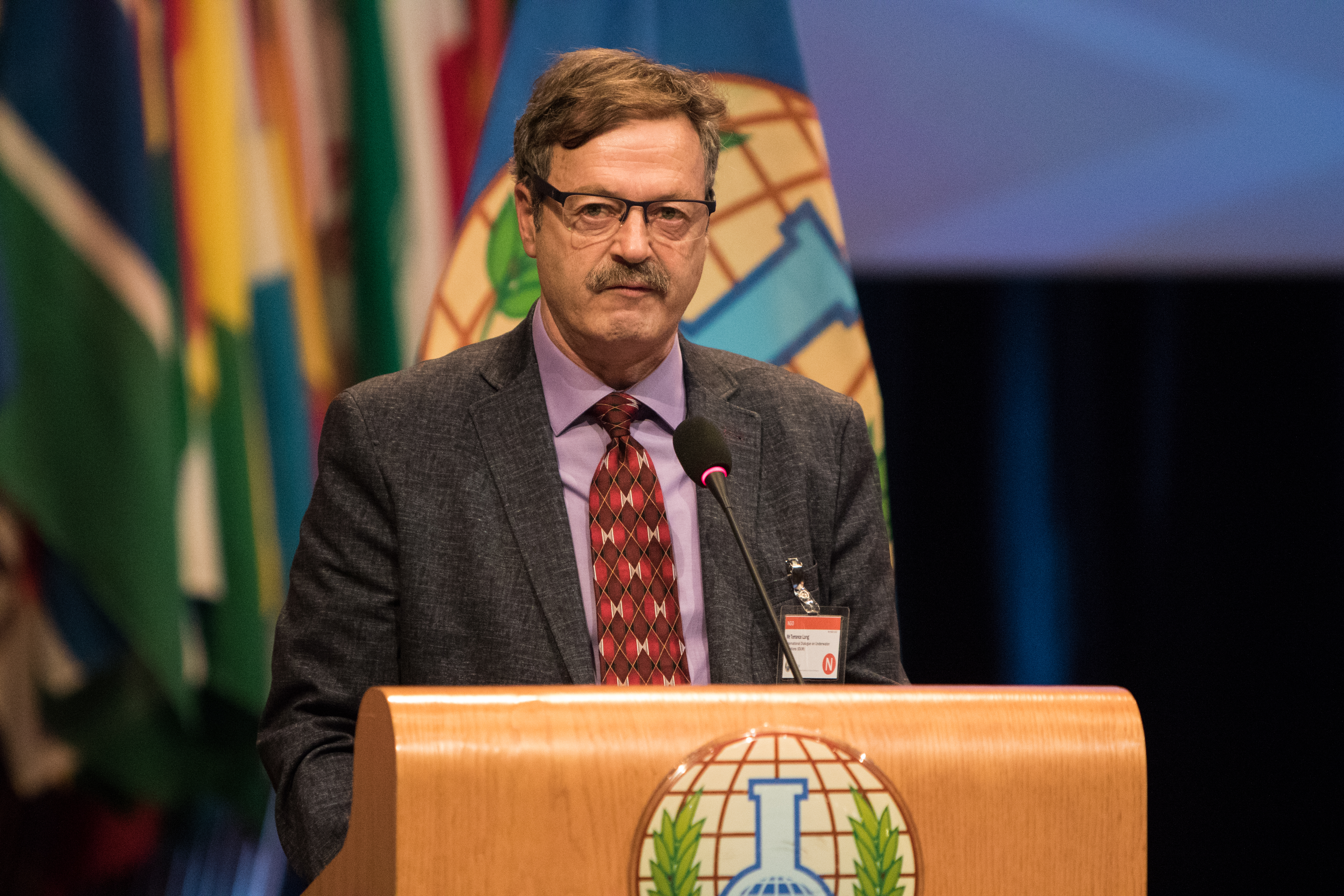
Terrance P. Long CD., speaking at Organization for the Prohibition of Chemical Weapons (OPCW) Fourth Review Conference.

Terrance is the founder of IDUM an internationally recognized NGO where all stakeholders (diplomats, government departments including external affairs, environmental protection and fishery, fossil fuel and fishing industry, salvage divers, militaries, and others) can come together to cooperate in an open and transparent forum to discuss underwater munitions, seek solutions, and promote international cooperation on related ocean issues. IDUM Mission is promote the creation of a Treaty and to Eradicate the Chemical, Conventional, Radiological Weapons from the Marine Environment (lakes, rivers, inland waterways, wetlands seas and oceans). This treaty would encourage countries to collaborate on aspects of underwater munitions research, science, and policy including environmentally friendly remediation.

IDUM and our sponsors have successfully hosted seven international dialogues on underwater munitions policy, science, technology and responses. IDUM efforts were recognized by inter-governmental institutions and bodies leading to the founder of Ocean Action# 21356 in the United Nations Ocean Registry to Eradicate the Munitions from the Seas. OA# 21356 was passed by the United Nations Security Council to support the implement of Sustainable Development Goal 14: Conserve and sustainably use the oceans, seas and marine resources for sustainable development. IDUM also eradicate munitions to support United Nations Sustainable Development Goals 13 Climate Actions. As a member of the Chemical Weapons Coalition (CWC) IDUM was awarded the 2022 prestigious "The Hague The OPCW Award" by Organisation for the Prohibition of Chemical Weapons (OPCW); the rare 2020 Protecting the Ocean Coin from the Royal Canadian Mint; a 2023 nominee for The Prince Charlies Veteran Entrepreneur Award and a Special Editor's Award from the Marine Technology Society Journal (MTS) for a two-part journal titled ‘The Legacy of Underwater Munitions: Policy and the Science of Assessment, Evaluation of Impacts and Potential Responses. IDUM have published and have helped to create international awareness with award winning international documentaries, that IDUM is featured in, titled: Deadly Depths, Canada Over the Edge, Footprints of War and NATO TV - Bomb Hunters of the Baltic Sea.

IDUM continues to seek cooperation and partnerships for scientific investigations, monitoring and remediation of underwater munitions. IDUM efforts has been in manned and unmanned autonomous and remotely operated underwater and surface vehicles, survey, intrusive investigation, risk management, monitoring, technology research and development and potential options (NATO, Russian Federation, Belgium, Denmark, Poland, Germany, Lithuania, Finland, Estonia, The Netherlands, USA, and Canada).

The UN identified IDUM efforts in the 2014 ‘UN Resolution on Sea Dumped Munitions,’ and in the 2013 Secretary General’s report titled ‘Cooperative Measures on Sea Dumped Chemical Munitions.' In 2014, the OPCW report titled ‘Third Review Conference of State Parties’ outlined the need for international cooperation on SDWs. 2021, delivered the Special Remarks in the European Parliament, Brussels, Belgium: “Unexploded munitions and chemical residues in the sea, while searching for lasting and economically viable solutions” and 2022 delivered the Thematic Keynote Address in Kiel, Germany, “Expert Panel Round Table on Dumped Munitions in the Baltic Sea.” Terrance chaired the Expert Panel on Sea Dumped Chemical Weapons, Centre for Disease Control (CDC), Atlanta, Georgia.

== Projects ==
=== Decision Aid for Marine Munitions (DAIMON) ===
Co-Director - Partner, The project which aimed to support maritime, defense and environmental administrations in making decisions on management strategies for dumped chemical and conventional warfare in the Baltic Sea, and the Skagerrak to assess the risk associated with corroding warfare objects, such as dumped containers filled with munitions. DAIMON will focus on the evaluation of risks associated with individual munitions, categorization of threats, and possible remediation methods. Economical and legal issues will also be addressed. Risk assessment/categorization methods will be applied in field studies in the Gulf of Finland, Bornholm and Gdańsk Deeps, Little Belt, and Skagerrak to produce examples of evaluation in different regions of the Baltic Sea. As the main result, an easy-to-use software, based on the research carried out within the project, will be presented to stakeholders (maritime administration, environmental agencies, etc.) in the Baltic Sea countries to provide them with a tool for the efficient management of the problem in their respective exclusive economic zones. The tool aims at making the knowledge gained in previous projects related to dumped munitions available to decision makers in the Baltic Sea area. Project activities:

1. Performing both laboratory and in-situ experiments to assess the potential impacts of munitions on the Baltic Sea ecosystem. Food safety will also be addressed.
2. Pilot studies evaluating the risk associated with selected warfare objects, e.g., wrecks filled with chemical munitions and single corroding chemical and conventional munitions on the sea bottom. Designation of objects for removal.
3. Assessment of the different remediation techniques on the designated objects regarding their impact on the environment and their costs vs. costs of no-action.

=== Chemical Munitions Search & Assessment (CHEMSEA) ===
Chemical Munitions, Search and Assessment (CHEMSEA) is a flagship project of the Baltic Sea Region Strategy, financed by the EU Baltic Sea Region Program 2007-2013. The project was initiated in autumn 2011 and will last through early 2014. It has a budget of €4.5M, which is part-financed by the European Union through the European Regional Development Fund. Goals that were formulated for the project:

1. Production of detailed maps of the Gotland and Gdansk Deep dumpsites including location of munitions and areas of contaminated sediments and potentially affected benthic fauna
2. Assessment of the toxicity of CWA degradation products to aquatic life based on in-situ and laboratory studies
3. Development of a model predicting the magnitude and direction of leakage events
4. Integrated assessment of ecosystem risks from CWA dumps
5. Development of novel, unified methodologies for CWA and CWA degradation product analysis to be used in all Baltic countries
6. Formulation of guidelines for different target groups for use when working with contaminated Baltic sediments

=== MODUM - NATO Science for Peace and Security ===
Co-Director - Partner, The project with the motto "Towards the monitoring of dumped munitions threat" aims the establishment of the monitoring network observing Chemical Weapons dumpsites in the Baltic Sea, using Autonomous Underwater Vehicles (AUVs)and Remotely Operated Underwater Vehicles (ROVs), and utilizing existing research vessels of partner institutions as launching platforms. The project consists of the test phase, which will serve to choose best available solutions for the difficult Baltic Sea environment, Survey phase, which will locate actual objects of concern, and monitoring phase, which will concentrate on the collection of environmental data close to the objects of concern. The project will concentrate on three representative areas chosen during the first phase of the project and will provide a solution for expanding such a network to all areas of concern in the Baltic Sea area. Performed monitoring activities will include habitat status evaluation, fish health studies, and modeling of possible threats to adjacent areas. https://www.youtube.com/watch?v=e4F3BtNaiSo

=== The Pentarius Deep Sub Project ===
The Deep Sub submersible is engineered to go to 36,000′ of depth – 16,000 PSI or 1100 Atmospheres. The pressure hull is built of carbon fiber with an aluminum dome at the back end and a fused quartz dome at the front. The fused quartz is a man-made ingot that has taken over three years to machine from a 2800 lb ingot to a 550 lb hemisphere. The dome offers an unprecedented view – no one on the seafloor has ever had a view like this. The rest of the sub is “flooded” – water is around the components. Important items are filled with oil but are still exposed to the full pressure. This includes the batteries, servos, and electric motors that are used for motion on the seafloor. Syntactic foam, a special buoyancy material, makes up the rest of the volume of the sub. The sub’s instruments include high-def sonar, video, and chemical sensors. Together, they will allow scientists to paint a full picture of the deep environment based on an unprecedented amount of raw data.

== Partnerships ==
- United Nations
- Organization for Prohibition of Chemical Weapons
- North Atlantic Treaty Organization
- European Union
- General Inspectorate for Environment
- Centers for Disease Control and Prevention
- Helsinki Commission
- Polish Naval Academy
- Finland Ministry of the Environment
- Swedish Coast Guard
