= Organisation for the Prohibition of Chemical Weapons =

Intergovernmental organisation

Organisation for the Prohibition of Chemical Weapons (OPCW)
Arabic	منظمة حظر الأسلحة الكيميائية
Spanish	Organización para la Prohibición de las Armas Químicas
French	Organisation pour l'interdiction des armes chimiques
Russian	Организация по запрещению химического оружия
Chinese	禁止化学武器组织
- Logo of the OPCW

- Member states of the OPCW (green)
- Formation: 29 April 1997
- Headquarters: The Hague, Netherlands
- Coordinates: 52.091241°N 4.283193°E
- Members: 193 member states (all states party to the CWC are automatically members. 4 UN Member States are non-members: Egypt, Israel, North Korea and South Sudan)
- Official languages: Arabic, Chinese, English, French, Russian, Spanish
- Director General: Sabrina Dallafior Matter
- Official organs: Conference of the States Parties; Executive Council; Technical Secretariat
- Website: www.opcw.org

The Organisation for the Prohibition of Chemical Weapons (OPCW) is an intergovernmental organisation and the implementing body for the Chemical Weapons Convention (CWC), which entered into force on 29 April 1997. The OPCW, with its 193 member states, has its seat in The Hague, Netherlands; it oversees the global endeavour for the permanent and verifiable elimination of chemical weapons.

The organisation promotes and verifies the adherence to the Chemical Weapons Convention, which prohibits the use of chemical weapons and requires their destruction. Verification consists both of evaluation of declarations by member states and onsite inspections.

The organisation was awarded the 2013 Nobel Peace Prize "for its extensive efforts to eliminate chemical weapons". Nobel Committee chairman Thorbjørn Jagland said, "The conventions and the work of the OPCW have defined the use of chemical weapons as a taboo under international law".

== History ==
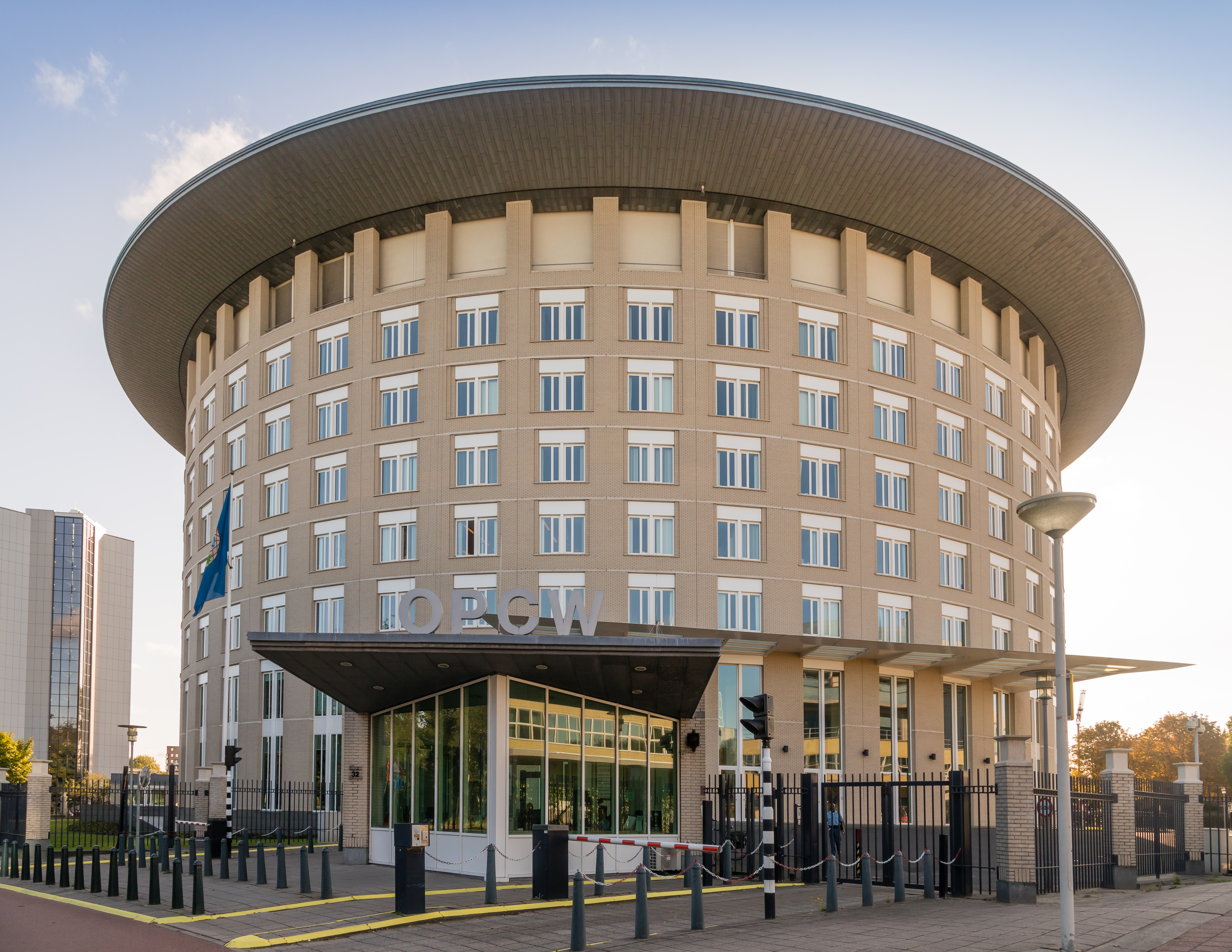
The headquarters of the Organisation for the Prohibition of Chemical Weapons

The Hague was chosen as the location for the seat of the organisation after a successful lobby of the Dutch government, competing against Vienna and Geneva. The organisation has its headquarters next to the World Forum Convention Centre (where it holds its yearly Conference of States Parties) and an equipment store and laboratory facility in Rijswijk. The headquarters were officially opened by Queen Beatrix of the Netherlands on 20 May 1998. and consist of an eight-story building built in a semi-circle. A permanent memorial to all victims is present at the back of the building and is open to the public.

The OPCW headquarters building was designed by American architect Gerhard Kallmann of Kallmann McKinnell & Wood.

The first Director-General only served about one year of his second term, after which, in April 2002, he was removed from office on grounds of lack of confidence by the member states. It was argued by The Guardian's columnist George Monbiot that Director-General José Bustani was being forced out by the U.S. government, despite the convention insisting the OPCW "shall not seek or receive instructions from any government"; the US had tried to persuade Brazil to recall Bustani. Monbiot wrote that the U.S. had tried other measures, although the convention also indicates that states should "not seek to influence" staff. In line with his mandate, Bustani wanted Iraq to sign the convention thus allowing international chemical weapons monitors into Iraq and thus potentially impeding the U.S. push for war against Iraq. The U.S. gave three main arguments for the removal of Bustani's from his position: "polarising and confrontational conduct", "mismanagement issues" and "advocacy of inappropriate roles for the OPCW". The removal was subsequently determined to be improper by an Administrative Tribunal of the International Labour Organization and consequently Bustani was awarded €50,000 in moral damages, his pay for the remainder of his second term, and his legal costs.

On 11 October 2013, the Norwegian Nobel Committee announced that the OPCW had been awarded the Nobel Peace Prize for "extensive work to eliminate chemical weapons". The committee further indicated how "Recent events in Syria, where chemical weapons have again been put to use, have underlined the need to enhance the efforts to do away with such weapons." In the year ending September 2014, the OPCW had overseen the destruction of some 97 per cent of Syria's declared chemical weapons.

In 2014, The OPCW–The Hague Award was established to honour select individuals and institutions by highlighting their exceptional contributions towards the goal of a world permanently free of chemical weapons. The award was created as a legacy of the OPCW winning the 2013 Nobel Peace Prize. The OPCW—The Hague Award fund was created using the approximately €900,000 monetary prize which accompanied the Nobel Peace Prize, and is also supported financially by the City of The Hague, where the OPCW is based.

On 13 April 2018, the OPCW became the target of an attempted cyberattack by Russian GRU agents. The agents were detained by Dutch Intelligence agents with hacking equipment in their possession. The agents were later expelled from the country. The British Culture Secretary Jeremy Wright alleged that the attempted cyberattack was meant to interfere with the OPCW investigation into the 2018 Salisbury poisonings.

In June 2018, the OPCW voted to expand its own powers, allowing itself to assign blame for a contravention of its regulations.

In November 2019, a unanimous agreement of OPCW member states allowed the addition of the Novichok agents to "list of controlled substances" of the CWC "in one of the first major changes to the treaty since it was agreed in the 1990s" in response to the 2018 poisonings in the UK.

== Organisational structure ==
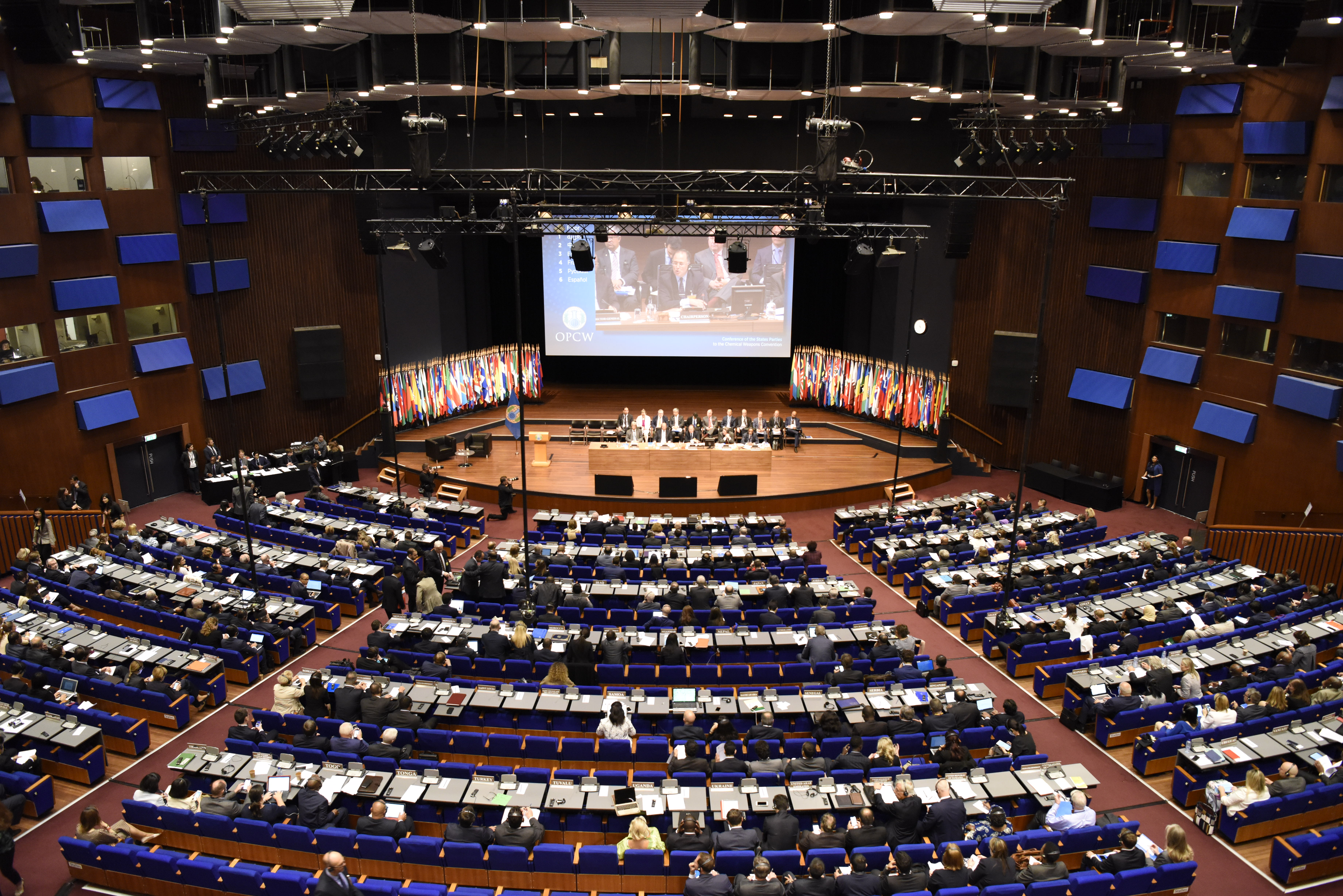
Fourth Special Session of the Conference of the States Parties (2018)

The activities of the OPCW and its core organisational structure are described in the Chemical Weapons Convention (whose members are all in OPCW). The principal body is the Conference of the States Parties (CSP), which normally is convened yearly, and in which all countries can participate, with equal voting rights. Countries are generally represented in the conference by a permanent representative to the organisation, which in most cases is also the ambassador to the Netherlands. The conference decides on all main topics regarding the organisation (for example, taking retaliation measures) and the convention (approving guidelines, imposing retaliating measures against members).

The Executive Council (EC) is the executive organ of the organisation and consists of 41 states parties, which are appointed by the conference on a two-year term. The council amongst others oversees the budget and cooperates with the General Secretariat on all matters related to the convention.

The Technical Secretariat (TS) applies most of the activities mandated by the council and is the body where most of the employees of the organisation work. The main activities of the OPCW are performed by the inspection and the verification divisions.

All states parties make contributions to the OPCW budget, based on a modified UN scale of assessments. The OPCW budget for 2020 is €70,958,760

== Powers ==
The OPCW has the power to report on whether chemical weapons were used in an attack it has investigated.

"The OPCW has the power to send inspectors to any signatory country to search for evidence of production of banned chemicals. It also can send experts to help countries to investigate crime scenes where chemical agents may have been used."

In June 2018 following the Skripal poisoning the UK convinced other members despite the Russian opposition that the OPCW needed to grant itself new powers to assign blame for attacks. The vote was won by a margin of 82 to 24, which exceeded the two-thirds majority needed for the motion to pass.

== Inspections ==
=== Chemical weapons destruction facilities ===
At all operational chemical weapons destruction facilities, 24/7 inspections by the OPCW take place on site to verify the success of the destruction as well as the amounts of weapons being destroyed. In light of the hazardous environment in which the inspections take place, they are generally performed by evaluation via CCTV-systems.

=== Industry inspections ===
Inspections are designed to verify compliance of States Parties with the requirements imposed on production and use of scheduled chemicals and to verify that industrial activities of member states have been correctly declared according to the obligation set by the CWC. The intensity and frequency of the inspections is dependent on the type of chemical produced (in descending order: Schedule 1, Schedule 2, Schedule 3 or DOC, see Scheduled Chemicals), but is regardless of the standing of the member state. For Schedule 1 and 2 facilities, a mass balance is prepared to identify whether all produced chemicals can be accounted for and whether the amounts are consistent with the declarations made by member states. Furthermore, at Schedule 2 and 3 facilities clues are investigated whether, contrary to the declaration and to the rules in the convention, Schedule 1 chemicals are produced. At Schedule 3 and DOC, the main aim is to check the declaration and to verify the absence of Schedule 2 and Schedule 1 production units. The time limit Schedule 2 inspections is 96 hours while Schedule 3 and DOC inspections can take a maximum of 24 hours. There is no time limit on Schedule 1 inspections.

=== Challenge inspections and investigations of alleged use ===
In case of allegation of use of chemical weapons or the prohibited production, a fact-finding inspection can be employed according to the convention. None of those activities have taken place, although the OPCW contributed to investigations of alleged use of chemical weapons in Syria as part of a United Nations mission. The OPCW only undertakes these inspections on request of another member state, after verification of the presented proof. To avoid misuse, a majority of three-quarters can block a challenge inspection request.

== Relations with the United Nations ==
While the OPCW is not a specialised agency of the United Nations, it cooperates both on policy and practical issues as a related organisation within the United Nations System. On 7 September 2000, the OPCW and the United Nations signed a cooperation agreement outlining how they were to coordinate their activities. The inspectors furthermore travel on the United Nations Laissez-Passer in which a sticker is placed explaining their position, and privileges and immunities. The United Nations Regional Groups also operate at the OPCW to govern the rotations on the Executive Council and provide informal discussion platform.

== Membership ==
All 193 parties to the Chemical Weapons Convention are automatically members of the OPCW. Other states which are eligible to become members are UN member states: Israel is a signatory state that has not ratified the Convention; and Egypt, North Korea and South Sudan, which have neither signed nor acceded to the Convention. Palestine was the most recent state to submit its instrument of accession to the Convention. On 21 April 2021, Syria was stripped of its voting rights at the OPCW after Syrian forces were found to have repeatedly used poison gas during the Syrian civil war. A two-thirds majority of members voted to immediately revoke Syria's privileges at the agency.

== Leadership ==
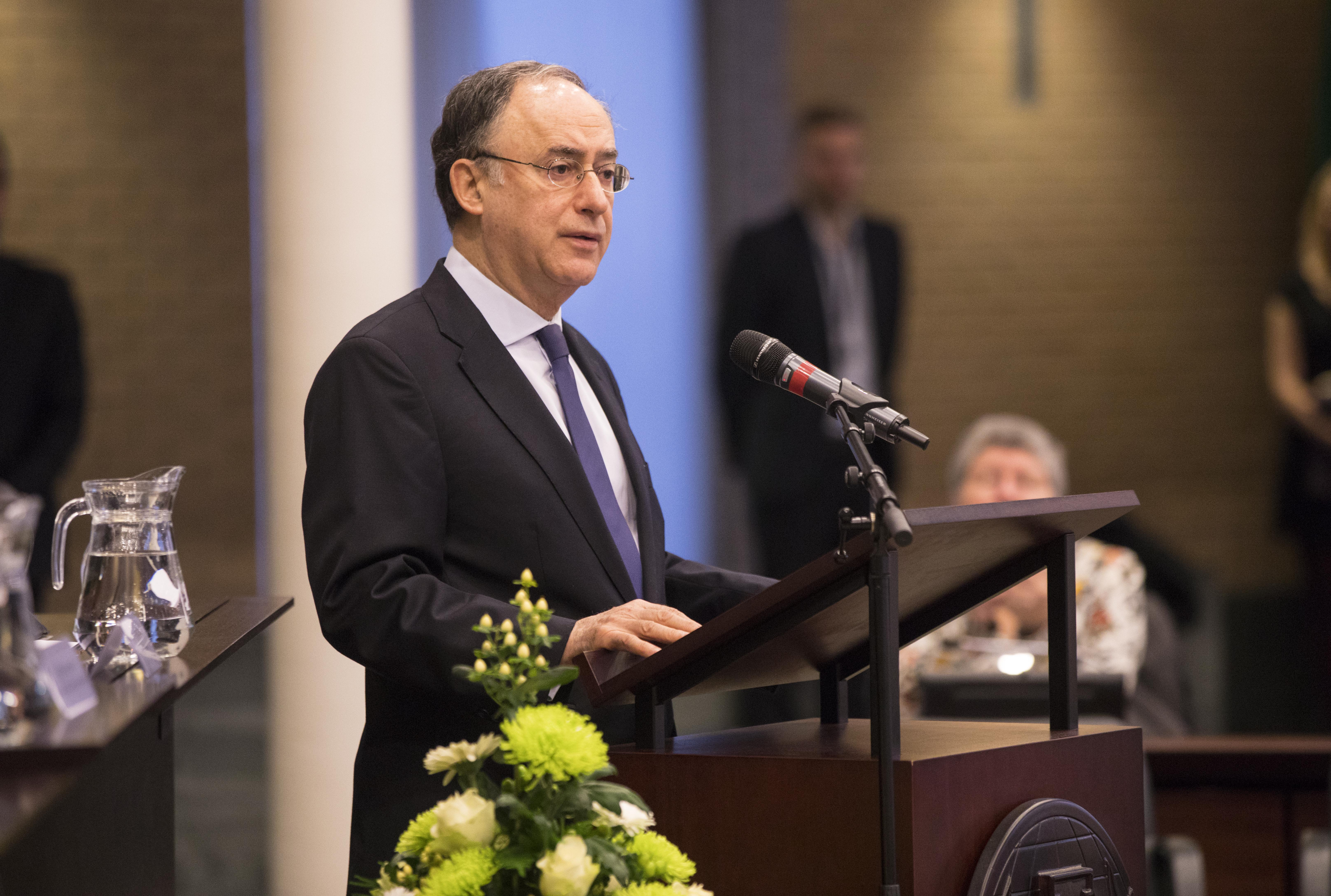
Fernando Arias, former Director-General of the OPCW

The Director-General is directly appointed by the Conference for a maximum of two four-year terms. A historical list of Directors-General is shown below.

Country	Name	Start of term
Brazil	José Bustani	13 May 1997
Argentina	Rogelio Pfirter	25 July 2002
Turkey	Ahmet Üzümcü	25 July 2010
Spain	Fernando Arias	25 July 2018
Switzerland	Sabrina Dallafior Matter (Current)	25 July 2026

The Organisation is currently led by the Swiss Director-General Ambassador Sabrina Dallafior Matter.In November 2025, she was elected director general following a consensus recommendation by the Executive Council of the Organization. She is the first woman to lead the Organization.

== Findings by the Administrative Tribunal of the International Labour Organization ==
In 2002, the United States convened an extraordinary session of the Conference of the States Parties of the OPCW to request the dismissal of José Bustani, then Director General of the OPCW. Bustani was dismissed following the vote, held on 22 April 2002, with 48 states voting in favor, 7 against and 43 abstaining. Subsequently, Bustani accused the United States of having provoked his impeachment because he had succeeded in convincing Saddam Hussein to ratify the Chemical Weapons Convention, which implied inspection of the Iraqi arsenal by OPCW investigators and would have thwarted the American plan of an invasion of Iraq. He also lodged a complaint before the Administrative Tribunal of the International Labour Organization, which, by a judgment of 16 July 2003, quashed the dismissal and condemned the OPCW to compensation for material and moral damage. Bustani did not seek to be reinstated in office.

== See also ==
- 1990 Chemical Weapons Accord
- Australia Group
- Chemical bombing of Sardasht
- Day of Remembrance for All Victims of Chemical Warfare
- Halabja poison gas attack
- International Dialogue on Underwater Munitions (IDUM)

Awards and achievements
Preceded by European Union	Laureate of the Nobel Peace Prize; 2013	Succeeded by Kailash Satyarthi; Malala Yousafzai
