= List of ambassadors of Spain to North Macedonia =

Ambassador of Spain to North Macedonia
- Coat of arms of Spain
- Incumbent; Rafael Soriano Ortiz since 31 July 2024
- Ministry of Foreign Affairs; Secretariat of State for the European Union
- Style: The Most Excellent
- Residence: Skopje
- Nominator: The Foreign Minister
- Appointer: The Monarch
- Term length: At the government's pleasure
- Inaugural holder: Jorge Fuentes Monzonís-Villalonga
- Formation: 1995
- Website: Mission of Spain to North Macedonia

The ambassador of Spain to North Macedonia is the official representative of the Kingdom of Spain to the Republic of North Macedonia.

Diplomatic relations between both countries were established on 28 July 1994. Initially, the ambassador was resident in Sofia, Bulgaria, and in 2006 it was created a resident embassy in Skopje.

== List of ambassadors ==
Name		Term	Nominated by	Appointed by	Accredited to
1	Jorge Fuentes Monzonís-Villalonga (Note: Resident in Sofia.)	11 February 1995 – 8 February 1997 (1 year, 363 days)	Javier Solana	Juan Carlos I	Kiro Gligorov
2	José Coderch Planas	7 June 1997 – 3 March 2001 (3 years, 269 days)	Abel Matutes	Juan Carlos I	Kiro Gligorov
3	José Ángel López Jorrín	30 June 2001 – 18 September 2004 (3 years, 80 days)	Josep Piqué	Juan Carlos I	Boris Trajkovski
4	Fernando Arias	26 February 2005 – 9 September 2006 (1 year, 195 days)	Miguel Ángel Moratinos	Juan Carlos I	Branko Crvenkovski
5	José Manuel Paz y Agüeras	9 September 2006 – 6 November 2010 (4 years, 58 days)	Miguel Ángel Moratinos	Juan Carlos I	Branko Crvenkovski
6	Fernando de Galainena Rodríguez	6 November 2010 – 26 July 2014 (3 years, 262 days)	Trinidad Jiménez	Juan Carlos I	Gjorge Ivanov
7	Ramón Abaroa Carranza	26 July 2014 – 26 August 2017 (3 years, 31 days)	José Manuel García-Margallo	Felipe VI	Gjorge Ivanov
8	Emilio Lorenzo Serra	26 August 2017 – 16 September 2021 (4 years, 21 days)	Alfonso Dastis	Felipe VI	Gjorge Ivanov
9	José Luis Lozano García	16 September 2021 – 31 July 2024 (2 years, 319 days)	José Manuel Albares	Felipe VI	Stevo Pendarovski
10	Rafael Soriano Ortiz	31 July 2024 – present (2 years, 38 days)	José Manuel Albares	Felipe VI	Gordana Siljanovska-Davkova

== See also ==
- North Macedonia–Spain relations
