= Sabrina Dallafior =

Swiss diplomat

Director-General of the Organisation for the Prohibition of Chemical Weapons
- Incumbent
- Assumed office 25 July 2026
- Preceded by: Fernando Arias

Personal details
- Born: Sabrina Dallafior Matte; 13 August 1970 (age 55) Basel, Switzerland
- Citizenship: Swiss
- Occupation: Diplomat

Sabrina Dallafior Matter (born 13 August 1970 in Basel, Switzerland) is Swiss diplomat currently serving as director-general of the Organisation for the Prohibition of Chemical Weapons (OPCW), the first woman to hold that office. She was previously ambassador of Switzerland to Finland.

== Biography ==
From 2019 to 2023, she was Consul General of Switzerland in Milan. In 2023, she was appointed ambassador of Switzerland to Finland.

In November 2025, she was elected director-general of the OPCW for a four-year term beginning in July 2026.
