= Fernando Arias =

Spanish diplomat

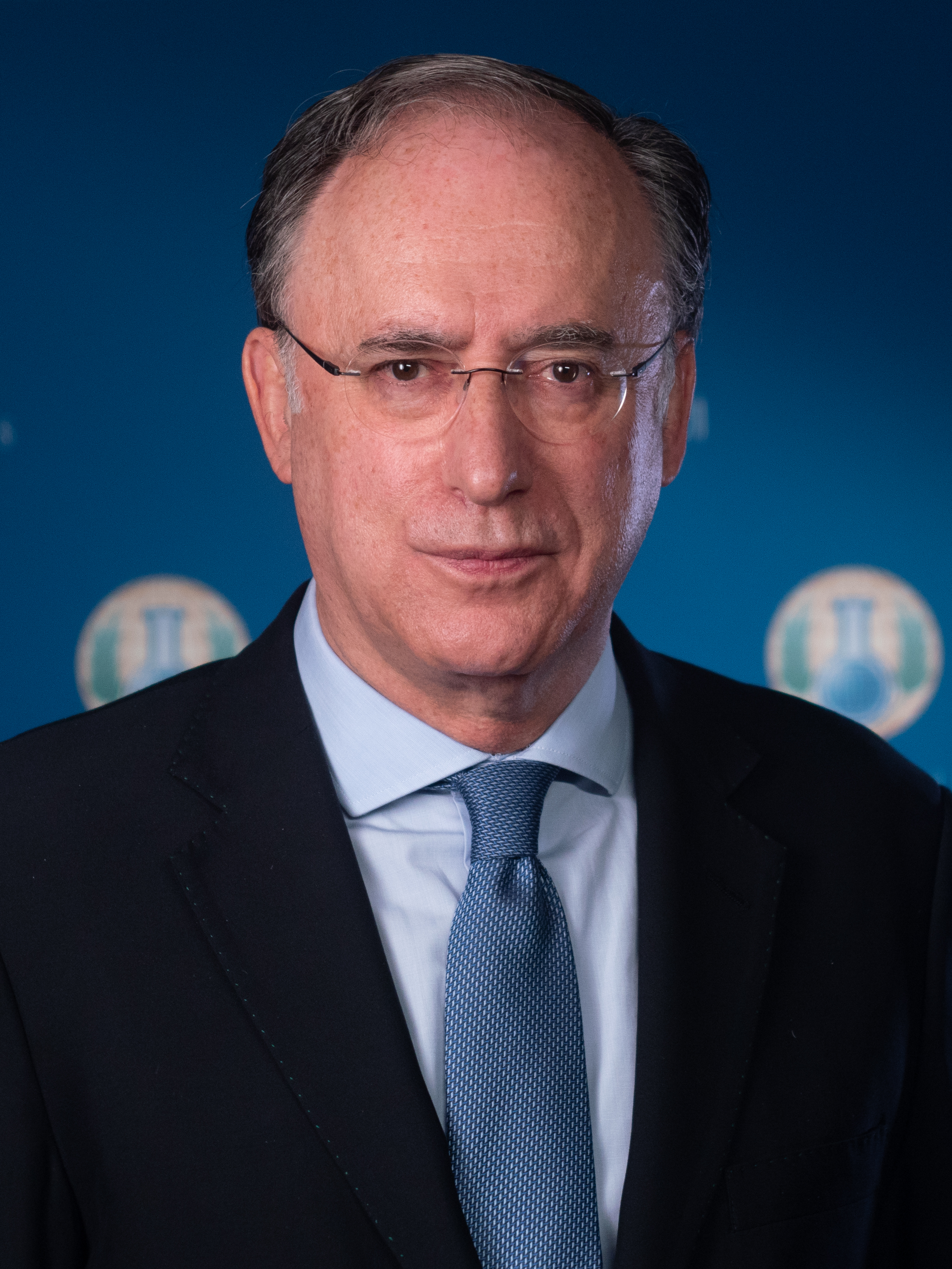
- Official portrait, 2018

Director-General of the Organisation for the Prohibition of Chemical Weapons
- In office 25 July 2018 – 25 July 2026
- Preceded by: Ahmet Üzümcü
- Succeeded by: Sabrina Dallafior

Personal details
- Born: Fernando Arias González; 27 February 1952 (age 74) Madrid, Spain
- Occupation: Diplomat

Fernando Arias González (February 27, 1952, Madrid) is a Spanish diplomat, who was the Director-General of the Organisation for the Prohibition of Chemical Weapons (OPCW) between 2018 and 2026. He previously served as an ambassador of Spain.

== Background ==
The appointment of Arias followed a consensus recommendation by the OPCW Executive Council in October 2017. Arias was re-appointed for a second four year term on 30 November 2021.

Arias is a career diplomat with extensive experience in multilateral diplomacy. He previously served as Ambassador of Spain to the Netherlands and as Spain's Permanent Representative to the OPCW. He also has served as Permanent Representative of Spain to the United Nations in New York and Ambassador of Spain to Mali, Mauritania, former Macedonia, and Bulgaria.

== Decorations ==
Spanish Decorations
Decoration	Date Awarded
Commander (Highest Grade), Order of Charles III	2004
Commander, (Highest Grade) Order of Isabella the Catholic	12 March 2012
Commander, Order of Isabella the Catholic	6 December 1995
Official, Order of Isabella the Catholic	24 June 1987
Commander, Order of Civil Merit	23 June 1990
Official, Order of Civil Merit	23 June 1984
Cross of the Spanish Police with White Distinctive	2006

Foreign Decorations
Decoration	Country
Grand Cross, Order of Orange-Nassau	Netherlands
Commander, Order of Orange Nassau	Netherlands
Official, Order of Orange Nassau	Netherlands
Commander, National Order of Merit	Mauritania
Grand Cross, Order of May	Argentina
Grand Cross, Grand-Duchy of Luxembourg	Luxembourg
Grand Cross, Order of Bernardo O'Higgins	Chile
Grand Cross, Order of Honorato Vásquez	Ecuador
Grand Cross, Order of the Phoenix	Greece
Grand Officer, Order of Merit of the Federal Republic of Germany	Germany
Grand Cross, Stara Planina	Bulgaria
Grand Cross, Rio Branco	Brazil
Commander, Order of St. Gregory the Great	Vatican City
Knight, National Order of the Legion of Honour	France
