= José Bustani =

Brazilian diplomat (born 1945)

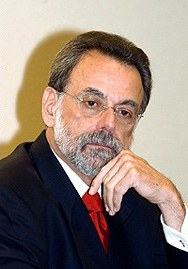
José Maurício Bustani, 2003.

José Maurício de Figueiredo Bustani (born June 5, 1945) is a Brazilian diplomat who was the first director-general of the Organisation for the Prohibition of Chemical Weapons until he was ousted after pressure from the US government in April 2002 over disagreements about how to address Iraq's alleged weapons of mass destruction.

== Career ==
Born in Porto Velho, Rondônia, he received his law degree from the Pontifical Catholic University of Rio de Janeiro in 1967, and attended the Rio Branco Institute in the same year, after which he joined the Brazilian Foreign Service. He was the ambassador of Brazil in several countries, including the United Kingdom, between 2003 and 2008, and France, from 2008 up to retiring in 2015.

== Director General of the OPCW ==
Bustani was appointed the first director general of the OPCW in 1997. His four-year term was due to expire in 2001. However, he was unanimously reelected to this position one year early, in May 2000 for a term of four years.

=== Removal from Office ===
Soon after, Bustani fell out of favour with the U.S., who began to lobby aggressively for his removal, in a campaign orchestrated by U.S. official John Bolton. Finally, at Bolton's behest, a special meeting was held in The Hague on April 21, 2002. Following what are reputed to have been both secretive and tempestuous deliberations, a vote was held, with Bustani's removal being carried by a vote of 48–7, with 43 abstentions. This is thought to be the first time in history that the head of a major international organisation was removed during his or her term of office, and the most bitter public campaign by the United States to force a senior international official from office since the Clinton administration blocked the 1996 reelection of U.N. Secretary General Boutros Boutros Ghali.

There is much controversy surrounding the reasons behind Bustani's removal. He had been negotiating with the Iraqi government, and was hoping to persuade them to sign up to the OPCW, thus granting OPCW inspectors full access to Iraq's purported "chemical weapons arsenal". If Bustani had succeeded, this would have placed an extremely uncomfortable obstacle in the path of the Bush administration's war plans, by removing their ostensible motive. While Bustani's supporters insist this was the reason why the US forced him out the Bush administration claimed that Bustani's position was no longer tenable, stating three main reasons: "polarizing and confrontational conduct", "mismanagement issues" and "advocacy of inappropriate roles for the OPCW". Bolton's claims of mismanagement were later dismissed by a tribunal.

Bustani's supporters also claim that the U.S. ambassador John Bolton issued threats against OPCW - including the withdrawal of U.S. support for the organization - in order to coerce the member states to support the U.S. initiative against Bustani. Bustani stated that, when he refused to resign prior to the 2003 Iraq War, he was bullied and threatened by Bolton, who told him "You have 24 hours to leave the organization, and if you don't comply with this decision by Washington, we have ways to retaliate against you. ... We know where your kids live. You have two sons in New York". Bustani's statement appears to be consistent with what was said about Bolton's practices during the U.S. Senate hearings prior to his appointment as U.S. ambassador to the United Nations.

Bustani filed a complaint with the International Labour Organization Administrative Tribunal, which found that he had been unlawfully dismissed and set aside the dismissal decision. He was awarded compensation for both material and moral damages, as well as costs. In their judgment the tribunal condemned "political interference by member states" in the workings of the OPCW. Bustani did not seek reinstatement. According to the Statement of the Delegation of Brazil, on the IX Conference of States Parties to the Chemical Weapons Convention on 3 December 2004, Bustani donated 100% of his compensation for moral damages ("an amount which exceeds Euro 50,000.00") to the International Cooperation programmes of the OPCW: "A letter of Ambassador Bustani regarding this donation and comments about the final Judgement of the ILOAT on the issue of his removal can be found in a National Paper distributed by Brazil, document C-9/NAT.1, dated 13 August 2004."

== Nomination for the Nobel Peace Prize ==
In 2003, Bustani was nominated for the Nobel Peace Prize for his achievements at the OPCW. For many, this nomination represented the acknowledgement of his commitment to the neutrality, independence and emphasis on the multilateral character of the organization as well as the non-discriminatory treatment of member states. However he did not receive the prize. Ten years after, in 2013, the OPCW, as an organization, won the Nobel Peace Prize. The OPCW Director-General recognised the contributions of former staff members of the Preparatory Commission and the Technical Secretariat by giving them a certificate marking the historic achievement.

== Douma Chemical Attack ==
In October 2019, Bustani was part of a Courage Foundation panel which heard a presentation from one of the OPCW whistleblowers related to the Douma chemical attack. Bustani wrote that "The convincing evidence of irregular behaviour in the OPCW investigation of the alleged Douma chemical attack confirms doubts and suspicions I already had". In November 2019, he signed a letter asking the OPCW to "permit all inspectors who took part in the Douma investigation to come forward and report their differing observations in an appropriate forum".

In October 2020, Bustani was scheduled to testify at the United Nations Security Council about the alleged cover up by the OPCW regarding the Douma chemical attack. The United States, Britain and France blocked Bustani from testifying on the grounds that Bustani left the OPCW in 2002 and thus was not involved in the issues being discussed. The representative of the Russian Federation read out the statement Bustani would have delivered. According to Democracy Now, Bustani had intended asking the OPCW to look into statements by some of its inspectors who have questioned the official OPCW findings into the chemical attack and have stated that the OPCW engaged in "evidence suppression, selective use of data and exclusion of key investigators" when making its report.
