= SACLANT ASW Research Centre =

SACLANT ASW Research Centre (1959–1986) SACLANT Undersea Research Centre (1987–2003)
- SACLANTCEN logo
- Abbreviation: SACLANTCEN
- Formation: 1959
- Dissolved: 2003
- Type: Military research
- Legal status: Treaty
- Purpose: ASW research
- Headquarters: La Spezia, Italy
- Region served: Europe and North America
- Members: NATO
- Official languages: English and French

The SACLANT ASW Research Centre was the predecessor to the NATO Undersea Research Centre. It was known as The SACLANT ASW Research Centre from 1959 through 1986, and the SACLANT Undersea Research Centre from 1987 through 2003. The centre was commonly referred to as SACLANTCEN.

== Establishment of the centre ==
In the mid-1950s a series of events challenged the balance of power between the United States and the Soviet Union. In 1955 the Soviet Union, for the first time, launched a ballistic missile from a submarine. Two years later, on 4 October 1957, the world's first artificial satellite, Sputnik 1, was launched into orbit by the USSR. The U.S. started its own submarine-launched ballistic missile (SLBM) programme under then Chief of Naval Operations, Admiral Arleigh Burke, with the mission to launch a 1,500-nautical-mile (2,800 km) UGM-27 Polaris missile from a submarine. The initial goal was to have this operational by 1965, but Soviet activities resulted in an accelerated schedule to deliver the first submarine by December 1959 and the second vessel by March 1960.

The United States and NATO strived to restrict movement of the USSR submarine fleet. Many nations had active research laboratories in this field. Members of the U.S. Naval Research Advisory Committee paid a visit to numerous nations—Canada, Denmark, France, Germany, Italy, the Netherlands, Norway, and the United Kingdom—and reached an agreement to work together by pooling scientific information and expertise in anti-submarine warfare (ASW) research. Italy offered to provide a facility within its naval base in La Spezia. A nice climate, which allowed experiments to be carried out for most of the year, and the location, which provided easy access both to deep and shallow waters, favoured this solution.

The Supreme Allied Commander Atlantic (SACLANT), Admiral Jerauld Wright, USN, was the NATO commander responsible for ASW, and in June 1958, he endorsed the creation of a NATO international scientific organisation devoted to undersea research under the umbrella of the Virginia-based SACLANT command structure. Pending final approval of financial support from NATO members, the U.S. Secretary of Defence agreed to provide the necessary funding for the immediate establishment of this organisation. On 2 May 1959 the "SACLANT ASW Research Centre" or SACLANTCEN was officially commissioned. The flags of the nine NATO nations that provided personnel to the centre were raised for the first time with that of the Atlantic Alliance in the Italian naval compound east of La Spezia. During its first 4 years, the centre was managed by an Italian non-profit company, Società Internazionale Ricerche Marine or SIRIMAR, initially a subsidiary of Raytheon, but later owned and managed by Pennsylvania State University. In mid-1962, discussions in Paris resulted in a charter that was officially adopted by the North Atlantic Council on 20 October. This charter recognised the centre as a NATO organization under the direction of the Supreme Allied Commander Atlantic (SACLANT). The Scientific Advisory Council, which provided advice to SACLANT in the early years, evolved into the Scientific Committee of National Representatives (SCNR), which to this day provides advice related to the centre's programme of work.

== The early years ==
SACLANTCEN's mission was to conduct research and provide scientific and technical advice in the field of anti-submarine warfare to SACLANT. It could also be called upon to assist NATO nations in this domain. To carry out its mission the centre chartered an old freighter, the Aragonese (ship), which was quickly transformed into a research vessel, giving the organisation a seagoing capability. In 1964 the 2,800 tonne Maria Paolina G. was chartered, replacing the aging Aragonese.

In the early years the scientific programme was mostly centred on underwater acoustics, oceanography, systems concepts evaluation, and antisubmarine warfare. Understanding the complexities of how sound propagates underwater was, and continues to be, the basis for detecting and classifying submarines. Until the mid-1970s, the centre's research focus was mainly on deep waters, where Soviet nuclear submarines prowled for possible attack on the continental U.S. or to disrupt lines of communications between North America and Europe. In particular the Mediterranean Sea and the Strait of Gibraltar, which connected the two main operational areas, were of major interest. Studies in these two areas, carried out in the mid-1960s, resulted in significant developments in oceanographic buoy technology. Two longer cruises were carried out in the Greenland-Iceland-U.K. Gap.

== The centre in the 1970s ==
SACLANCEN was a pioneer in the use of underwater buoy connectors, which led to a significant increase in the efficiency of data recording operations. At the same time, progress in electronics and the close links to the U.S. resulted in the updating of digital computing equipment. Activity at-sea remained pretty intensive, and in 1974 the Manning, a T-Boat built for the U.S. Army and previously used by Columbia University for oceanographic work, joined the SACLANTCEN fleet on loan from the U.S. government.

In 1975, the scientific side of SACLANTCEN was reorganised into two main divisions: the Environmental and Systems Research Division and the Operational and Analytical Research Division. After more than a decade mostly dedicated to deep waters, shallow waters became a new priority as submarine activity in those areas was increasing and submarines were becoming quieter and available to more nations. To address shallow water problems, new factors had to be taken into consideration such as the type of ocean floor, sound reflection, reverberation, and clutter.

This led to further research on oceanography and acoustics with experiments carried out mostly along the Ligurian coast, while in the meantime new instruments were studied and developed for collecting data in shallower waters, although the improvement of data collection in deep waters continued. In the late 1970s, towed arrays made their presence in La Spezia. The centre started testing the first experimental hydrophone linear array built by Hughes Aircraft Corporation, on loan from the U.S. Office of Naval Research. Noise generated by the towing vessel proved to be the ultimate limiting factor. However the directionality (due to its length) and the possibility of positioning it at the optimal depth, as well as its passive and active capabilities, were the main advantages highlighted by tests. Based on studies carried out in 1976, two years later the Bistatic Active Towed Array (BITOW) sonar programme was launched. This system used a second vessel as auxiliary receiver, leading to a considerable increase of the detection range. The omnidirectional hydrophones used resulted in an inability to determine whether signals were coming from the right or left. SACLANTCEN resolved this problem by designing cardioid hydrophones which provided the left-right discrimination.

For towed arrays to be effective, the noise problem of the towing vessel needed to be solved. In 1984 the keel of a new research vessel specially designed for SACLANTCEN was laid at the Muggiano Fincantieri shipyard, a few hundred meters away from the centre. The design priority for this 3,180-tonne ship was the reduction of ship radiated noise. This goal was accomplished with a double hull and a specially designed propulsion system. The NATO Research Vessel (NRV) Alliance was launched in 1986 and commissioned in 1988, replacing the Maria Paolina G. Since then, it has retained its reputation as one of the quietest ships afloat, spending an average of 170 days a year at sea supporting the centre's experiments.

== The centre, 1980 to 2003 ==
In 1986 a five-year survey of the Greenland, Iceland, and Norwegian Seas (GIN Sea) was started. New technologies were adopted to be able to collect data over long periods of time in a harsh environment, with problems ranging from thermal shock on sensors to difficulties in lowering the buoys into the water. A total of 31 buoys with 118 sensors were deployed to record data over one year. With a loss of buoys below 5 percent, this was a notable achievement in oceanographic research. While this experiment was underway, on 9 November 1989 the Berlin Wall came down, marking the end of the Cold War. The centre's name change in 1987 to the SACLANT Undersea Research Centre clearly indicated the shift in focus from "Anti-Submarine Warfare" to "Underwater" research. The Iran–Iraq War with its Tanker War was a major event during that period.

=== Mine countermeasures ===
During this period, the decrease in NATO's strategic interest in anti-submarine warfare (ASW) was matched by a corresponding increase in the significance of mine countermeasures (MCM), especially in the context of expeditionary operations. This was highlighted by operations in the Northern Persian Gulf in 1990–91 when the projection of coalition power ashore was constrained by its maritime forces' ability to reduce, at an adequate rate, the risk posed by Iraqi mines. The new focus required higher sonar frequencies, the ability to identify mines masked by the environment, and an increase in the tempo of MCM operations. The centre's research activity was concentrated mainly on minehunting techniques, i.e. finding mines on the sea floor, which might be partly buried, discriminating mines from other harmless objects (clutter), and classifying them in order to take appropriate actions. High quality images were needed, which required high-frequency, high-resolution sonar imagery techniques. This in turn led to the development of automatic sonar interpretation systems, which reduced the amount of time needed to train personnel. The research focus shifted to remote minehunting with the ultimate objective of replacing a surface ship with robotic systems. This led the centre to revive some studies on synthetic aperture sonar (SAS), which had been shelved in the early 1970s as technologies were not yet mature at that time.

=== Anti-submarine warfare research ===
Submarine detection and classification remained on the research agenda, although the focus shifted gradually toward shallow waters. Low frequency active sonar (LFAS) research started in the early 1980s with a project to verify the feasibility of towed sonar systems, analysing typical performance-linked parameters such as propagation loss, signal coherence, noise, reverberation and target strength. SACLANTCEN links to military organisations were vital in obtaining support of naval submarine services, and numerous experiments were carried out in the Mediterranean. The shift in focus from deep to shallow waters came with the advent of small diesel-electric submarines that can operate close to home base. Detection in shallow waters is difficult due mainly to signal interferences from reverberation and clutter. New research programmes at the centre investigated how to reduce the number of false alarms caused by reverberation, directional interference and target-like clutter when LFAS was used closer to the coasts. Fixed feature removal methods were investigated, while studies on detection optimisation and information extraction were also carried out to automate and improve LFAS performances in shallow waters. Research was also conducted on static deployable sonar systems.

=== Marine mammal programme ===
In May 1996, SACLANTCEN carried out a shallow water acoustic classification experiment in Greece, in the Gulf of Kyparissia, with the source level towed by the NRV Alliance. During that time about 14 Cuvier's beaked whales stranded along the coast. As a result of the incident, SACLANTCEN hosted a bioascoustic panel with independent scientists to investigate the cause of the stranding. At that time, no clear-cut conclusions were made, as it was impossible to establish or to exclude a direct link between the experiment and the stranding. A recommendation was issued for environmental assessment procedures to be implemented, and this led in 1999 to the Sound Ocean Living Marine Resources (SOLMAR) programme at the centre. Since SACLANTCEN's location, La Spezia, is close to the Ligurian Sea International Marine Sanctuary whose northern boundaries are the coasts of Italy and France while its southern limit is Corsica, the first aim of the SOLMAR programme was to monitor and acquire information on marine mammals living in that area. This was carried out both visually and acoustically during a series of annual sea trials known as SIRENA.

Controlled exposed experiments have also been undertaken to verify any possible relationship between noise and marine mammal behaviour. Oceanographic measurements were also carried out to better understand the environment where the marine mammals live. Following other strandings in 2000 and 2002 in areas where NATO exercises were conducted, high priority was assigned to mitigate risks to marine mammals during NATO naval exercises. In 2002, the SOLMAR programme became the Marine Mammal Risk Mitigation (MMRM) project. Activities continued focusing on the optimisation of the risk mitigation package designed by SACLANTCEN, which includes passive acoustic monitors, a predictive habitat model, a sound propagation model, a website with planning and training aids, and a guiding policy for the use of active sonar in experiments. The package was updated following each cruise, which contributed to increased knowledge of marine mammal behaviour. A Human Diver and Marine Mammal Incident Action Team staffed by personnel from the centre was established and stood ready to deploy in case of stranding or diving incidents, although no strandings have been linked to SACLANTCEN operations since the SOLMAR/MMRM programme was established. One of the values of the project was that an increasing number of independent scientific and environmental organisations began to cooperate with the centre in this research area.

=== Military oceanography (MILOC) ===
Although both theoretical studies and MILOC operations partly covered shallow waters, such as the Shallow Meadow campaign in the Baltic in 1983–1987, most of SACLANTCEN activities were initially dedicated to deep waters, oriented towards antisubmarine warfare and the protection of sea lines of communication. The output of those activities were new concepts for the improvement of sonar or the development of underwater detection systems. MILOC activities also resulted in oceanographic and acoustic databases that supported modelling, resulting in improved exploitation of operational sensors.

In a post-Cold War environment, crises tended to be regional, taking place in unknown coastal waters, with operations involving joint and combined forces. MCM and ASW activities related to those operations required different knowledge of the related environment, silent diesel-electric submarines and mines becoming the dominant threat. Higher resolution models were needed as well as geographical information systems (GIS) containing all possible information related to the area. The challenge was to provide information in a short time frame. The new name of this task became Rapid Environmental Assessment, or REA, which was identified by SACLANT as a new underwater operational requirement in 1995.

The Adriatic Sea became the focus of attention in 1992 when NATO took part in a monitoring operation to verify sanctions imposed on Serbia and Montenegro by the United Nations. It was the start of the Balkan crisis, which would involve NATO naval forces for several years. A shallow water environment with intense trawler fishing activities, such as the Adriatic, required robust new instrumentation for oceanographic surveys conducted to support naval operations. SACLANTCEN designed an Acoustic Doppler Current Profiler (ADCP) with a low profile that is resistant to fishing trawlers. Named Barny, the ADCP sensors were at 0.5 m from the bottom providing optimal boundary layer coverage, and following tests of the prototype built at SACLANTCEN, it was mass-produced by a commercial company under centre supervision. The original model was equipped with a self-recoding device and had to be picked up for data retrieval after six months. An enhanced version better suited for small boat operations was developed together with the U.S. Naval Research Laboratory in 1996.

The need to measure ocean properties in the shortest possible time with expendable equipment led to the development of the Shallow-Water Expendable Environmental Profiler (SWEEP). SWEEP, which could operate in waters up to 100 meters deep, was moored to the bottom and at pre-programmed intervals would surface to transmit physical data collected on the bottom and while traveling to and from the surface. However, SWEEP was not usable in areas with trawler fishing activities. SACLANTCEN merged the features of Barny and SWEEP and developed the Shallow-water Environmental Profiler Trawl-safe Real-time (SEPTR), a buoy similar to Barny but with a profiler similar to the one used on SWEEP, which would surface at fixed intervals. Tested in 2000, SEPTR was available for use in the ASCOT01 sea trial and updated versions are still in operation today.

=== Operations research and analysis ===
Operational research has been a key activity at SACLANTCEN since its creation. Mostly dedicated to operational analysis and operational support, numerous software aids developed in the 1990s were provided to NATO nations through the centre's Scientific Committee of National Representatives (SCNR). Leveraging the knowledge acquired from different areas of activities, and showing how a multidisciplinary approach can produce useful tools for warfighters, SACLANTCEN was asked by several naval commands to provide them with antisubmarine warfare planning tools. The centre was also involved in studies related to changes in naval forces after the end of the Cold War, as well as in exercise evaluation. In 1993 the Commander Allied Naval Forces Southern Europe requested support for planning ASW operations in the Mediterranean, in order to optimise the protection of shipping in the Mediterranean.

With the increase in mine-related activities, SACLANTCEN also took part in the development of MCM Exclusive Planning and Evaluation Tool (EXPERT), led by NATO Consultation, Command and Control Agency (NC3A). MCM EXPERT helps commanders optimise mine search operations. Similarly the Electronic Minefield Referee (EMIR) tool developed by the operational analysis group was widely used in NATO and national exercises. Experts from the Centre often deployed onboard MCM vessels during exercises to compare predicted performances with actual minehunting results. They also provided advice on how to best use the knowledge on environmental conditions to clear more mines.

== Staffing and facilities ==
The number of scientists at the centre was authorised at a maximum of 50, hired mostly on limited-term contracts. This rotation of personnel enabled a regular inflow of new ideas and, over time, resulted in the establishment of a network of close contacts between SACLANTCEN and the national research centres as well as many universities and private companies, to which many scientists returned after their work at the centre. The scientific outputs from the centre were especially valuable to the smaller NATO nations, whose research capabilities were behind those of the larger nations, thus helping to reduce the gap between their institutions and those in the U.S. and U.K., for example. Scientists were supported by administrative and technical teams, in particular, an engineering department that provided the means to carry out the experimental work needed to develop or verify scientific theories. SACLANTCEN also features a unique facility in Europe: the Oceanography Calibrating Laboratory, created in the early 1980s, which provided instrument calibration according to the World Ocean Circulation Experiment (WOCE) standard in support of the centre's activities as well as for most NATO navies and research laboratories.

Most of the research activities required the support of ship assets managed by the SACLANTCEN Ship Management Office. At the turn of the 21st century, the T-Boat Manning had been in service for 45 years. The advantage of operations carried out with a silent ship were highlighted by the activity of NRV Alliance, which recorded about 170 days per year at sea, mostly dedicated to the centre's activities but also chartered to other organisations. In the late 1990s the Ship Management Office developed the mission profile and requirements for a new ship with a size comparable to that of the Manning but with characteristics similar to the NRV Alliance in terms of silent movement and scientific support capabilities. Once funds were obtained from NATO, a contract with McTay Marine Ltd. was signed in 2000 and the Coastal Research Vessel (CRV) Leonardo was delivered to NATO in the UK on 31 July 2002, a few months after the lease of the Manning had expired. CRV Leonardo was commissioned in La Spezia on 6 September 2002 as the first Italian public vessel.

== Into the new millennium ==
During the 2002 Prague Summit, NATO's military command structure was reorganized with a focus to become leaner and more efficient. Supreme Headquarters Allied Power Europe was to become the single strategic command focused on NATO field operations under the name Allied Command Operations (ACO) while Supreme Allied Commander Atlantic would be focused on transforming NATO operations, changing its name in Allied Command Transformation (ACT). ACT was formally established on June 19, 2003, and the same day SACLANTCEN changed its name into the NATO Undersea Research Centre (NURC).
