= List of ambassadors of Spain to India =

Ambassador of Spain to India
- Coat of arms of Spain
- Incumbent; Alfredo Martínez Serrano since 28 October 2026
- Ministry of Foreign Affairs; Secretariat of State for Foreign Affairs
- Style: The Most Excellent
- Residence: New Delhi
- Nominator: The Foreign Minister
- Appointer: The Monarch
- Term length: At the government's pleasure
- Inaugural holder: Luis de Olivares y Bruguera, 2nd Count of Artaza
- Formation: 1956
- Website: Mission of Spain to India

Blue: Embassy in New Delhi Green: Consulate General in Mumbai Yellow: Consulate General in Bangaluru

The ambassador of Spain to India is the official representative of the Kingdom of Spain to the Republic of India. It is also accredited to the Kingdom of Bhutan, the Republic of Maldives, the Federal Democratic Republic of Nepal and the Democratic Socialist Republic of Sri Lanka.

India and Spain established diplomatic relations in 1956, and Spain created a resident embassy in New Delhi in June of that year.

Since 28 October 2026, diplomat Alfredo Martínez Serrano, former chief of protocol of the Royal Household and ambassador to Canada, has served as ambassador of Spain to India.

== Jurisdiction ==
- India: Diplomatic relations between both nations are managed through the Embassy in New Delhi. The Embassy also offers consular services to the National Capital Territory of Delhi and the northern, eastern and insular areas of India, as well as to the other Asian states to which it is dually accredited. Spain also has a Consulate General in Mumbai, that offers consular protection to the citizens located in western and central India and a Consulate General in Bengaluru for the south part of the country. Consular protection is complemented with honorary consulates in Bengaluru, Chennai and Kolkata.

The ambassador is also accredited to:

- Bhutan: Both kingdoms maintained informal relations since Bhutan's accession to the United Nations in 1971. After high-level meetings, both countries established diplomatic relations on 11 February 2011. Consular protection is responsibility of the Embassy in New Delhi.
- Maldives: Diplomatic relations were established on 24 August 1979. Spain has an honorary consulate in Malé.
- Nepal: Both nations established diplomatic relations on 14 May 1968. Spain has an honorary consulate in Kathmandu.
- Sri Lanka: Since 10 July 1955, both countries maintain diplomatic links and, until 1958, it was responsibility of the ambassador to Pakistan. Spain has an honorary consulate in Colombo.

In the past, the ambassador to India also served as ambassador to Bangladesh (1972–2007) and Burma (Myanmar; 1967–1981).

== List of ambassadors ==
Ambassador		Term	Nominated by	Appointed by	Accredited to
1	Luis de Olivares y Bruguera (Note: Accredited to Sri Lanka.); Count of Artaza	30 August 1956 – 6 April 1962 (5 years, 219 days)	Alberto Martín-Artajo	Francisco Franco	Rajendra Prasad
2	Pelayo García-Olay y Álvarez	6 April 1962 – 1 May 1965 (3 years, 25 days)	Fernando María Castiella	Francisco Franco	Rajendra Prasad
3	Miguel Teus y López (Note: Accredited to Burma, Nepal and Sri Lanka.)	25 April 1966 – October 1968 (2 years, 160 days)	Fernando María Castiella	Francisco Franco	Sarvepalli Radhakrishnan
4	Guillermo Nadal y Blanes (Note: Chargé d'affaires from October 1968 to March 1969.) (Note: Accredited to Bangladesh, Burma, Nepal and Sri Lanka.)	24 March 1969 – 17 July 1975 (6 years, 115 days)	Fernando María Castiella	Francisco Franco	Zakir Husain
5	Leopoldo Martínez de Campos y Muñoz; Count of Santovenia	9 September 1975 – 30 October 1980 (5 years, 51 days)	Pedro Cortina Mauri	Francisco Franco	Fakhruddin Ali Ahmed
6	Enrique Mahou Stauffer (Note: Accredited to Bangladesh, Maldives, Nepal and Sri Lanka.)	12 June 1981 – 11 June 1986 (4 years, 364 days)	José Pedro Pérez-Llorca	Juan Carlos I	Neelam Sanjiva Reddy
7	Carlos Fernández Espeso	11 June 1986 – 14 July 1990 (4 years, 33 days)	Francisco Fernández Ordóñez	Juan Carlos I	Zail Singh
8	Santiago Salas Collantes	14 July 1990 – 24 December 1994 (4 years, 163 days)	Francisco Fernández Ordóñez	Juan Carlos I	Ramaswamy Venkataraman
9	Álvaro de Castilla y Bermúdez-Cañete	24 December 1994 – 19 January 1998† (1 year, 342 days)	Javier Solana	Juan Carlos I	Shankar Dayal Sharma
10	Alberto Escudero Claramunt	6 June 1998 – 28 December 2002 (4 years, 205 days)	Abel Matutes	Juan Carlos I	K. R. Narayanan
11	Rafael Conde de Saro	28 December 2002 – 2 June 2007 (4 years, 156 days)	Ana Palacio	Juan Carlos I	A. P. J. Abdul Kalam
12	Ion de la Riva (Note: Accredited to Maldives, Nepal and Sri Lanka.)	2 June 2007 – 16 November 2010 (4 years, 205 days)	Miguel Ángel Moratinos	Juan Carlos I	A. P. J. Abdul Kalam
13	Francisco Javier Elorza y Cavengt (Note: Accredited to Bhutan, Maldives, Nepal and Sri Lanka.); Marquess of Nerva	5 February 2011 – 14 April 2012 (1 year, 69 days)	Trinidad Jiménez	Juan Carlos I	Pratibha Patil
14	Gustavo de Arístegui	14 April 2012 – 19 December 2015 (3 years, 249 days)	José Manuel García-Margallo	Juan Carlos I	Pratibha Patil
-	María Magdalena Cruz Yábar, chargé d'affaires (2015–2017)				
15	José Ramón Barañano Fernández	11 March 2017 – 28 October 2020 (3 years, 231 days)	Alfonso Dastis	Felipe VI	Pranab Mukherjee
16	José María Ridao	21 July 2021 – 5 June 2024 (2 years, 320 days)	José Manuel Albares	Felipe VI	Ram Nath Kovind
17	Juan Antonio March Pujol	5 June 2024 – 28 October 2026 (2 years, 145 days)	José Manuel Albares	Felipe VI	Droupadi Murmu
18	Alfredo Martínez Serrano	28 October 2026 – present (3 days)	José Manuel Albares	Felipe VI	Droupadi Murmu

== See also ==
- India–Spain relations
