= United Nations Security Council Resolution 10 =

United Nations Security Council resolution

UN Security Council Resolution 10
- The Flag of Spain under Franco
- Date: November 4 1946
- Meeting no.: 79
- Code: S/RES/10 (Document)
- Subject: The impact of Spain's dictatorship on International Peace and Security
- Voting summary: 11 voted for; None voted against; None abstained
- Result: Adopted

Security Council composition
- Permanent members: China; France; Soviet Union; United Kingdom; United States
- Non-permanent members: Australia; Brazil; Egypt; Mexico; Netherlands; Poland

United Nations Security Council Resolution 10 was adopted unanimously on 4 November 1946. The Council determined that Francoist Spain no longer warranted continuous observation and turned over all related documents to the General Assembly.

== See also ==
- Spanish question (United Nations)
- Spain and the United Nations
- United Nations Security Council Resolution 4
- United Nations Security Council Resolution 7
