= Spanish question =

Spanish question may refer to:

- Spanish question, a discussion at the 1822 Congress of Verona
- Spanish question (United Nations), concerning the relationship between Francoist Spain and the UN after World War II

== See also ==
- Inverted question and exclamation marks, used to mark the start of questions and exclamations in Spanish orthography
