= United Nations Security Council Resolution 7 =

United Nations Security Council resolution

UN Security Council Resolution 7
- The Flag of Spain under Franco
- Date: June 26 1946
- Meeting no.: 49
- Code: S/RES/7 (Document)
- Subject: The impact of Spain's dictatorship on International Peace and Security
- Result: Adopted

Security Council composition
- Permanent members: China; France; Soviet Union; United Kingdom; United States
- Non-permanent members: Australia; Brazil; Egypt; Mexico; Netherlands; Poland

United Nations Security Council Resolution 7 was adopted on 26 June 1946. The Council resolved to maintain continuous observation of Francoist Spain and protect international security.

The resolution was adopted in parts. No vote was taken on the text as a whole.

== See also ==
- Spanish question (United Nations)
- Spain and the United Nations
- United Nations Security Council Resolution 4
- United Nations Security Council Resolution 10
