= List of ambassadors of Spain to Lithuania =

Ambassador of Spain to Lithuania
- Coat of arms of Spain
- Incumbent; José Fernando Fernández-Aguayo Muñoz since 1 July 2025
- Ministry of Foreign Affairs; Secretariat of State for the European Union
- Style: The Most Excellent
- Residence: Vilnius
- Nominator: The Foreign Minister
- Appointer: The Monarch
- Term length: At the government's pleasure
- Inaugural holder: Carlos Fernández-Longoria y Pavía
- Formation: 1991
- Website: Mission of Spain to Lithuania

The ambassador of Spain to Lithuania is the official representative of the Kingdom of Spain to the Republic of Lithuania.

Lithuania and Spain maintained diplomatic relations in the past, during the Polish–Lithuanian Commonwealth, however, these were managed through the ambassador in Warsaw, seat of the royal court. After Lithuania's independence, Spain recognized the country on 27 July 1922. Since 1929, the Spanish minister to Latvia was also accredited to Lithuania, and it served until 1940, when the Soviet Union invaded the country. Diplomatic relations were re-established on 7 October 1991. The ambassador to Denmark assumed the diplomatic and consular affairs until 2004, when Spain created a resident embassy in the Vilnius.

== List of ambassadors ==
This list was compiled using the work "History of the Spanish Diplomacy" by the Spanish historian and diplomat Miguel Ángel Ochoa Brun. The work covers up to the year 2000, so the rest is based on appointments published in the Boletín Oficial del Estado.

=== List of ministers to the First Lithuanian Republic (1922–1940) ===
During this period, the minister was resident in Riga, Latvia.

| Name | Term | Rank |
|---|---|---|
| Eduardo García Comin | 1929–1932 | Minister |
| Bunaventura Caro y del Arroyo | 1932 | Minister |
| Jesús de Encío y Cortés | 1936 | Chargé d'affaires |
| Ceferino Palencia y Álvarez-Tubau | 1936–1939 | Chargé d'affaires |
| Luis de Olivares y Bruguera | 1939–1940 | Chargé d'affaires |

=== List of ambassadors to Lithuania (1991–present) ===
Resident in Copenhagen, Denmark until 2004.

| Name | | Term | Rank |
|---|---|---|---|
| 1 | Carlos Fernández-Longoria y Pavía | 1991–1993 | Ambassador |
| 2 | Jesús Ezquerra Calvo | 1993–1994 | Ambassador |
| 3 | Antonio de Oyarzábal Marchesi | 1995–1996 | Ambassador |
| 4 | José Luis Pardos | 1997–2001 | Ambassador |
| 5 | José María Pons Irazazábal | 2001–2004 | Ambassador |
| 6 | Fidel López Álvarez | 2004–2007 | Ambassador |
| 7 | José Luis Solano Gadea | 2007–2011 | Ambassador |
| 8 | Miguel Antonio Arias Estévez | 2011–2014 | Ambassador |
| 9 | Emilio Fernández-Castaño y Díaz-Caneja | 2014–2018 | Ambassador |
| 10 | José María Robles Fraga | 2018–2022 | Ambassador |
| 11 | María Nieves Blanco Díaz | 2022–2025 | Ambassador |
| 12 | José Fernando Fernández-Aguayo Muñoz | 2025–present | Ambassador |

== See also ==
- Lithuania–Spain relations
