= United Nations Security Council Resolution 4 =

United Nations Security Council resolution

UN Security Council Resolution 4
- The Flag of Spain under Franco
- Date: April 29 1946
- Meeting no.: 39
- Code: S/RES/4 (Document)
- Subject: The impact of Spain's dictatorship on International Peace and Security
- Voting summary: 10 voted for; None voted against; 1 abstained
- Result: Adopted

Security Council composition
- Permanent members: China; France; Soviet Union; United Kingdom; United States
- Non-permanent members: Australia; Brazil; Egypt; Mexico; Netherlands; Poland

United Nations Security Council Resolution 4 was adopted on 29 April 1946. The Council condemned Francoist Spain and formed a sub-committee to assess the conflict in the country.

Resolution 4 passed with ten votes to none. The Soviet Union abstained. It marked the first time that a permanent member abstained without casting a veto.

== See also ==
- Spanish question (United Nations)
- Spain and the United Nations
- United Nations Security Council Resolution 7
- United Nations Security Council Resolution 10
