= List of ambassadors of Spain to Pakistan =

Ambassador of Spain to Pakistan
- Coat of arms of Spain
- Incumbent; Carlos Aragón Gil de la Serna since 27 December 2025
- Ministry of Foreign Affairs; Secretariat of State for Foreign Affairs
- Style: The Most Excellent
- Residence: Islamabad
- Nominator: The Foreign Minister
- Appointer: The Monarch
- Term length: At the government's pleasure
- Inaugural holder: Fermín Sanz-Orrio
- Formation: 1951
- Website: Mission of Spain to Pakistan

The ambassador of Spain to Pakistan is the official representative of the Kingdom of Spain to the Islamic Republic of Pakistan.

Both countries have maintained diplomatic relations since 1951. In September that year, Spain established a resident embassy in Karachi and was later moved to Islamabad. The Embassy's Consular Section provides consular protection throughout the country, supported by honorary consulates in Karachi and Lahore.

In the past, the ambassador to Pakistan has been also responsible for Afghanistan (1979–2005 (Note: The ambassador to Pakistan acted as de facto ambassador to Afghanistan from 1979 to 2002. In 2002 this situation was confirmed with an appointment with double accreditation until 2005, when the Embassy in Kabul was reopened.)) and Sri Lanka (1955–1958). Since the fall of Kabul to the Taliban in 2021, the Embassy of Spain in Islamabad is responsible for visas and consular affairs related to Afghanistan.

== List of ambassadors ==
Name		Term	Nominated by	Appointed by	Accredited to
1	Fermín Sanz-Orrio	26 January 1952 – 5 May 1954 (2 years, 99 days)	Alberto Martín-Artajo	Francisco Franco	Malik Ghulam Muhammad
2	Francisco de Amat y Torres	1 June 1954 – 22 June 1955 (1 year, 21 days)	Alberto Martín-Artajo	Francisco Franco	Malik Ghulam Muhammad
3	Manuel Galán Pacheco de Padilla (Note: Accredited to Sri Lanka.)	25 June 1955 – 15 January 1958 (2 years, 204 days)	Alberto Martín-Artajo	Francisco Franco	Iskander Mirza
4	Fernando Canthal y Girón	15 January 1958 – 25 August 1958 (222 days)	Fernando María Castiella	Francisco Franco	Iskander Mirza
5	Pedro Seoane y Diana; Marquess of Orellana la Vieja	25 August 1958 – 6 March 1967 (8 years, 193 days)	Fernando María Castiella	Francisco Franco	Iskander Mirza
6	Eduardo Gasset y Díez de Ulzurrun; Count of Peñarrubias	20 March 1967 – 4 April 1970 (3 years, 15 days)	Fernando María Castiella	Francisco Franco	Ayub Khan
7	Manuel de la Calzada Herranz; Marquess of Santa Cruz de Inguanzo	27 June 1970 – 18 March 1972 (1 year, 265 days)	Gregorio López-Bravo	Francisco Franco	Yahya Khan
8	Marcelino Fernández Díez	18 March 1972 – 25 March 1976 (4 years, 7 days)	Gregorio López-Bravo	Francisco Franco	Zulfikar Ali Bhutto
9	Ignacio de Casso García	20 May 1976 – 29 July 1981 (5 years, 70 days)	The Count of Motrico	Juan Carlos I	Fazal Ilahi Chaudhry
10	Víctor Sánchez-Mesas y Juste	29 July 1981 – 8 October 1984 (3 years, 71 days)	José Pedro Pérez-Llorca	Juan Carlos I	Muhammad Zia-ul-Haq
11	José María Campoamor Elías	8 October 1984 – 28 July 1986 (1 year, 293 days)	Fernando Morán	Juan Carlos I	Muhammad Zia-ul-Haq
12	José García Bañón	28 July 1986 – 22 June 1991 (4 years, 329 days)	Francisco Fernández Ordóñez	Juan Carlos I	Muhammad Zia-ul-Haq
13	José María Ullrich Rojas	4 September 1991 – 12 March 1994 (5 years, 219 days)	Francisco Fernández Ordóñez	Juan Carlos I	Ghulam Ishaq Khan
14	Lorenzo González Alonso	26 March 1994 – 26 February 1998 (3 years, 337 days)	Javier Solana	Juan Carlos I	Farooq Leghari
15	Aurora Bernáldez	26 February 1998 – 3 January 2002 (3 years, 311 days)	Abel Matutes	Juan Carlos I	Muhammad Rafiq Tarar
16	Antonio Segura Morís (Note: Accredited to Afghanistan.)	3 January 2002 – 1 February 2005 (3 years, 1 day)	Josep Piqué	Juan Carlos I	Pervez Musharraf
17	José María Robles Fraga	1 February 2005 – 23 December 2008 (3 years, 326 days)	Miguel Ángel Moratinos	Juan Carlos I	Pervez Musharraf
18	Gonzalo María Quintero	23 December 2008 – 26 May 2012 (3 years, 155 days)	Miguel Ángel Moratinos	Juan Carlos I	Asif Ali Zardari
19	Javier María Carbajosa Sánchez	26 May 2012 – 13 June 2015 (3 years, 18 days)	José Manuel García-Margallo	Juan Carlos I	Asif Ali Zardari
20	Carlos César Morales Sánchez	13 June 2015 – 12 October 2018 (3 years, 121 days)	José Manuel García-Margallo	Felipe VI	Mamnoon Hussain
21	Manuel Durán Giménez-Rico	12 October 2018 – 15 June 2022 (3 years, 246 days)	Josep Borrell	Felipe VI	Arif Alvi
22	José Antonio de Ory Peral	15 June 2022 – 27 December 2025 (3 years, 195 days)	José Manuel Albares	Felipe VI	Arif Alvi
23	Carlos Aragón Gil de la Serna	27 December 2025 – present (254 days)	José Manuel Albares	Felipe VI	Asif Ali Zardari

== See also ==
- Pakistan–Spain relations
