= Juan Antonio March Pujol =

Spanish diplomat

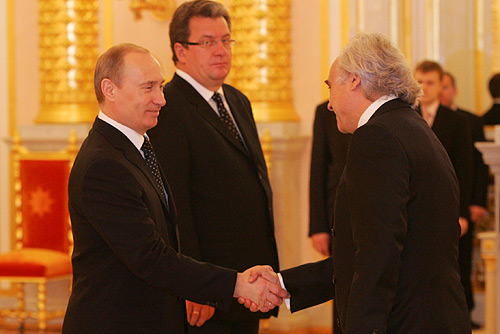
- Juan Antonio March Pujol presents his Letter of Credence to then-President of Russia Vladimir Putin on 22 April 2008.

Ambassador of Spain to India
- In office 4 June 2024 – 28 October 2026
- Preceded by: José María Ridao
- Succeeded by: Alfredo Martínez Serrano

Ambassador of Spain to Russia
- In office 28 December 2007 – 1 July 2011
- Preceded by: Francisco Javier Elorza
- Succeeded by: Luis Felipe Fernández

Permanent Representative of Spain to the United Nations
- In office 21 May 2004 – 28 December 2007
- Preceded by: Joaquín Pérez-Villanueva
- Succeeded by: Javier Garrigues

Personal details
- Born: 27 February 1958 (age 68) Barcelona, Spain
- Education: Diplomatic School of Spain
- Occupation: Diplomat, singer, composer

Juan Antonio March Pujol (born 27 February 1958) is a Spanish diplomat.

He served as Permanent Representative of Spain to the United Nations in Geneva (2004–2007) and as ambassador of Spain to Russia (2007–2011), accredited also to Armenia, Belarus, Turkmenistan and Uzbekistan. He presented his letter of credence to then-President of Russia Vladimir Putin on 22 April 2008.

From 2024 to 2026, he served as ambassador of Spain to India since 2024, accredited to Bhutan, Maldives, Nepal and Sri Lanka.

== Publications ==
- Poder y futuro. Veinte líderes mundiales y el mañana, La Vanguardia, Barcelona, 2019, 208 pp, ISBN 978-8416372584.
- Momentum: En el umbral del nuevo mundo, Espurna Nec&Otium, Barcelona, 2020, 281 pp, ISBN 978-8494579363.
