= Agustín Santos Maraver =

Spanish diplomat

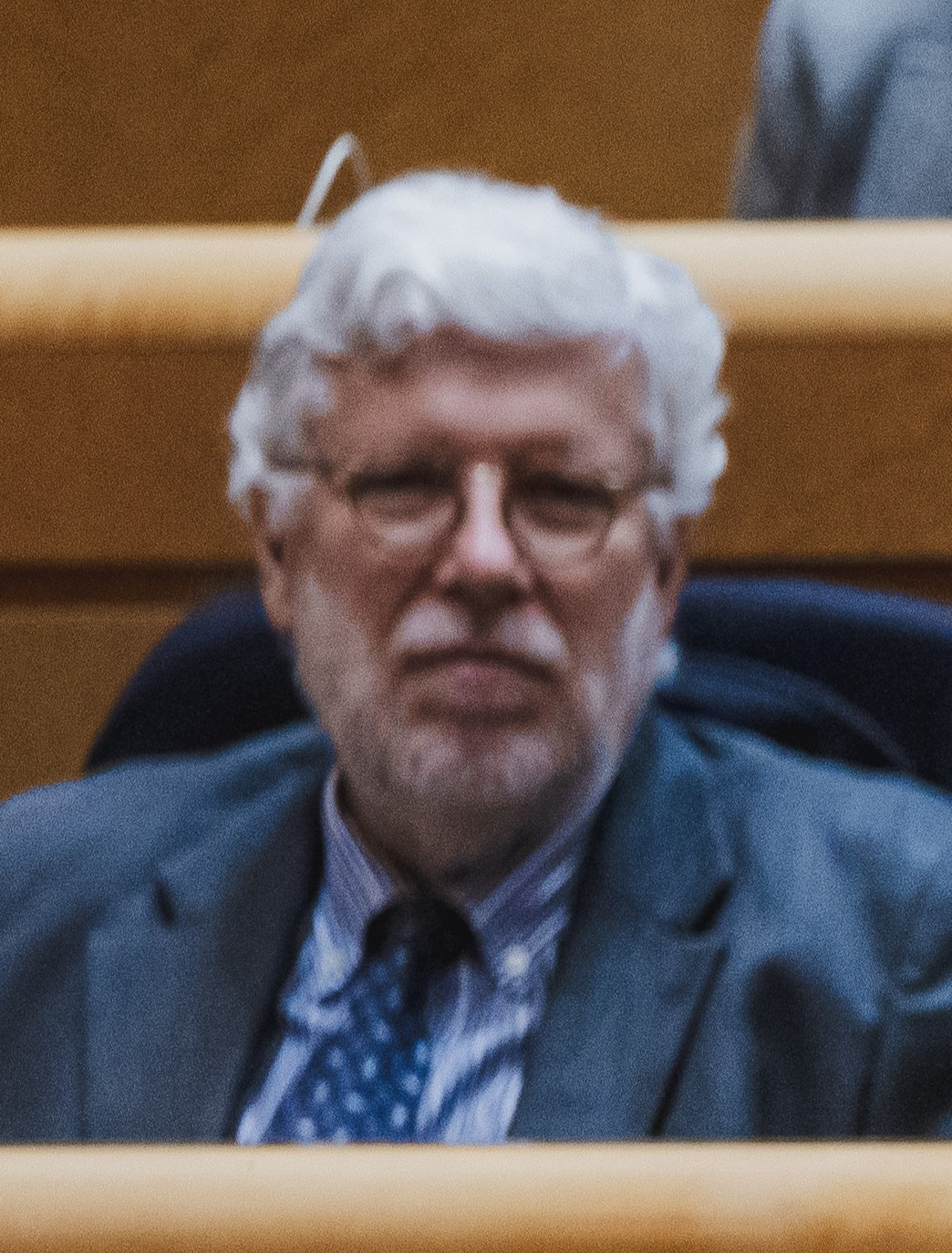

Member of the Congress of Deputies
- Incumbent
- Assumed office August 17, 2023
- Constituency: Madrid

Ambassador Permanent Representative of Spain to the United Nations
- In office August 4, 2018 – June 14, 2023
- Preceded by: Jorge Moragas
- Succeeded by: Héctor Gómez Hernández

Ambassador Permanent Representative of Spain to the United Nations Office and the International Organizations at Geneva
- In office January 22, 2011 – February 11, 2012
- Preceded by: Javier Garrigues Flórez
- Succeeded by: Ana María Menéndez Pérez

Personal details
- Born: September 21, 1955 (age 70) Los Angeles, United States

Agustín Santos Maraver (born September 21, 1955) is a Spanish diplomat and politician serving since 2023 as member of the Congress of Deputies from Madrid.

== Early life, family and education ==
Santos was born in Los Angeles, California, on September 21, 1955. His father, a well-known doctor from the province of Málaga, moved to the United States as he received an scholarship in pediatric cardiology. In the 1960s, the family returned to Spain. His uncle, Jesús Santos Rein, was a politician known for being the first president of Ferrocarriles Españoles de Vía Estrecha (FEVE).

Santos studied at the St. Augustine's College of Málaga and later attended the Complutense University of Madrid, graduating in philosophy and literature and in politics and sociology.

== Diplomatic career ==
In 1982 he joined the diplomatic corps and, during his first years, he was assigned to the Spanish diplomatic missions in China, Laos, Cuba and the United States. He also served as adviser in the Diplomatic Office of the Office of the Prime Minister, during the last years of the premiership of Felipe González.

In July 2008, foreign minister Miguel Ángel Moratinos appointed him as chief of staff, serving until October 2010. In January 2011, he was appointed as ambassador permanent representative of Spain to the United Nations Office at Geneva, and was dismissed in February 2012.

From 2013 to 2017 he served as consul general in Cape Town and in April 2017 he was appointed consul general in Perpignan, serving in this position until his appointment in August 2018 as Permanent Representative of Spain to the United Nations. As permanent representative, he chaired the United Nations General Assembly First Committee during the seventy-fifth session of the United Nations General Assembly (September 2020 – September 2021). He resigned in June 2023 to run in the next general election.

In June 2022, he was awarded with the Grand Cross of Military Merit.

On December 27, 2023, he was promoted to Ambassador, the highest rank in the diplomatic career.

== Political career ==
In June 2023, he joined the progressive coalition Sumar, led by deputy prime minister Yolanda Díaz. Santos ran in the 2023 general election for the province of Madrid, in second place after Díaz. He was elected member of the Congress of Deputies.

As a member of Congress, he has been a member of several committees —Foreign Affairs, Defence, Health and Joint Congress-Senate Committee on the European Union— and has chaired the Congress of Deputies Committee on Health since December 4, 2023.
