= Cristina Gallach =

Spanish journalist, former EU and UN official

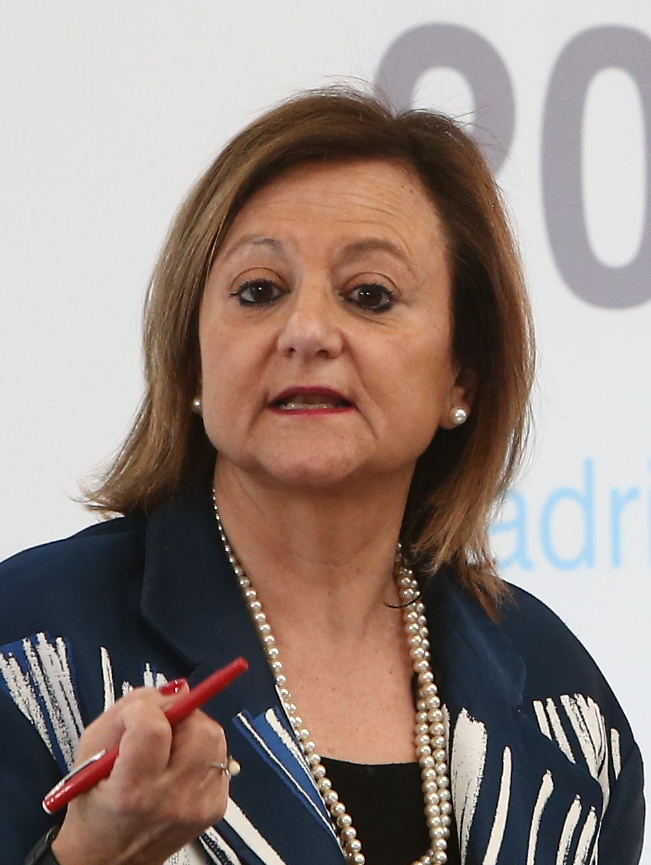

Special Commissioner for the Alliance for the New Economy of Language
- In office 3 March 2022 – 14 February 2024
- Monarch: Felipe VI
- Prime Minister: Pedro Sánchez
- Preceded by: Office established
- Succeeded by: Office abolished

Secretary of State for Foreign Affairs and for Ibero-America and the Caribbean
- In office 5 February 2020 – 21 July 2021
- Monarch: Felipe VI
- Prime Minister: Pedro Sánchez
- Preceded by: Fernando Martín Valenzuela Marzo (Foreign Affairs); Juan Pablo de Laiglesia (Ibero-American Affairs)
- Succeeded by: Ángeles Moreno Bau (Foreign Affairs); Juan Fernández Trigo (Ibero-American Affairs)

High Commissioner for the 2030 Agenda
- In office 7 July 2018 – 29 January 2020
- Monarch: Felipe VI
- Prime Minister: Pedro Sánchez
- Preceded by: Office established
- Succeeded by: Office abolished

Under-Secretary General of the United Nations for Communications and Public Information
- In office 1 February 2015 – 9 August 2017
- Secretary-General: Ban Ki-moon
- Preceded by: Peter Launsky-Tieffenthal
- Succeeded by: Alison Smale

Personal details
- Born: 1 April 1960 (age 66) Sant Quirze de Besora, Spain
- Party: Socialists' Party of Catalonia
- Education: Autonomous University of Barcelona; Columbia University

Cristina Gallach (born 1960) is a Spanish journalist and former European Union and United Nations official. She was the Secretary of State for Foreign Affairs and for Ibero-America and the Caribbean of the Spanish government from 2020 to 2021. She is a member of the Socialists' Party of Catalonia (PSC).

She is the only Spanish woman who has served in high rank positions both in EU, NATO and UN organizations.

== Early life ==
Cristina Gallach was born in 1960 in Spain. She obtained an licentiate degree in sciences of information (journalism) from the Autonomous University of Barcelona in 1982. She earned a master's degree in international affairs from New York's Columbia University in 1986, after being granted a Fulbright Scholarship.

== Career ==
Gallach worked as a journalist for the publication El 9 Nou, El Periódico, EFE, Avui and TVE in Barcelona.

Gallach has extensive experience in the field of communications. She has held several high-level positions and has worked as an aide to Javier Solana for 14 years during the latter's tenures as spokesperson for the Spanish Government, Secretary-general of NATO, Secretary-general of the European Union and thereafter as Secretary-general of both the European Union and Western European Union. When Gallach first met Javier Solana in the early 90’s, she was based in Russia as the Foreign Correspondent for the Spanish News Agency (EFE) covering the last years of the Perestroika.

Gallach was with the Council of the European Union as Head of the Public Relations Unit in the Directorate-General for Information and Communication.

Gallach, Wonder Woman actresses Gal Gadot and Lynda Carter, Wonder Woman director Patty Jenkins, and DC Entertainment President Diane Nelson appeared at the United Nations on October 21, 2016, the 75th anniversary of the first appearance of Wonder Woman, to mark the character's designation by the United Nations as its "Honorary Ambassador for the Empowerment of Women and Girls". The gesture was intended to raise awareness of UN Sustainable Development Goal No. 5, which seeks to achieve gender equality and empower all women and girls by 2030. The decision was met with protests from UN staff members who stated in their petition to UN Secretary-General Ban Ki-moon that the character is "not culturally encompassing or sensitive", and served to objectify women. As a result, the character was stripped of the designation, and the project ended December 16.

In July 2018, she was appointed High Commissioner for the 2030 Agenda of Spain, a new office created this year to coordinate the actions of the government to accomplish with the UN Sustainable Development Goals. She left the office in January 2020, when she was appointed as the 14th secretary of state for foreign affairs. In July 2021, new foreign minister José Manuel Albares replaced her with Ángeles Moreno Bau.

From March 2022 to February 2024, she served as high commissioner for Spain's New language economy strategic project.

Diplomatic posts
Preceded by Peter Launsky-Tieffenthal	Undersecretary General of the United Nations for Communications and Public Information; 2015–2017	Succeeded by Alison Smale
