= Kiyotaka Akasaka =

Japanese diplomat

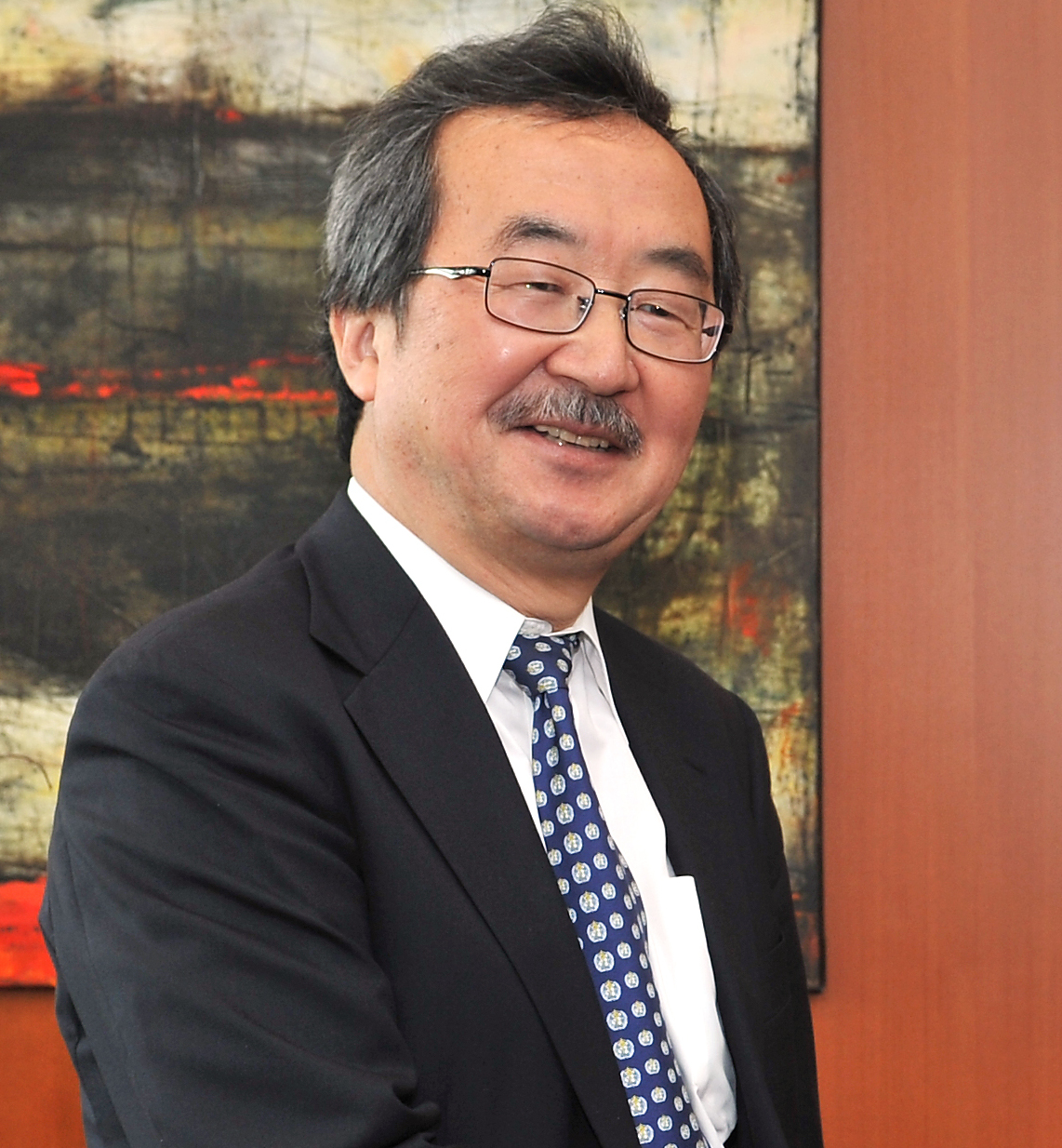
- Kiyotaka Akasaka in 2011
- Born: August 24, 1948 (age 78); Osaka, Japan
- Education: Kyoto University, Trinity College, Cambridge
- Occupation: Diplomat

Kiyotaka Akasaka (赤阪 清隆, Akasaka Kiyotaka; born August 24, 1948 in Osaka, Japan) is the former United Nations Under-Secretary-General for Communications and Public Information. He was appointed to the position by the UN Secretary-General Ban Ki-moon in February 2007. Akasaka also served as Coordinator for Multilingualism in the UN Secretariat. He completed his appointment at the UN in March 2012 and was succeeded by Peter Launsky-Tieffenthal of Austria.

A career diplomat, Mr. Akasaka has served several multilateral organizations in different capacities. From 2003 to 2007, he was the Deputy Secretary-General of the Organisation for Economic Co-operation and Development (OECD), where he was responsible for issues on development, environment, sustainable development and building and maintaining partnership with other international organizations.

From 1997 to 2000, he served as Deputy Director-General in the Multilateral Cooperation Department of the Japanese Foreign Ministry. He acted as one of the top negotiators in the Kyoto Conference on Climate Change in December 1997.

From 2000 to 2001, he served as the Japanese Ambassador to the United Nations. Previously, he worked at the Secretariat of the General Agreement on Tariffs and Trade (GATT) (1988–1991) and the World Health Organization (1993–1997).

Akasaka joined the Japanese Foreign Ministry in April 1971, where he held several posts. He was Deputy Director of the Press Division and later the Ministry's Spokesman on climate change issues for many years.

He obtained his Bachelor of Arts in law from Kyoto University in 1971. In the following year, he pursued his studies at Trinity College, Cambridge, where he obtained a Bachelor and a Master of Arts in economics.

He co-authored the books The GATT and the Uruguay Round Negotiations and The Cartagena Protocol on Biosafety. He also published many articles on trade, the environment and sustainable development in Japanese journals and newspapers.

Aside from his native Japanese, Akasaka is also fluent in both English and French.
