= Permanent Representative of Spain to the United Nations in Geneva =

Senior Spanish diplomat

Ambassador Permanent Representative of Spain to the United Nations Office and Other International Organizations in Geneva
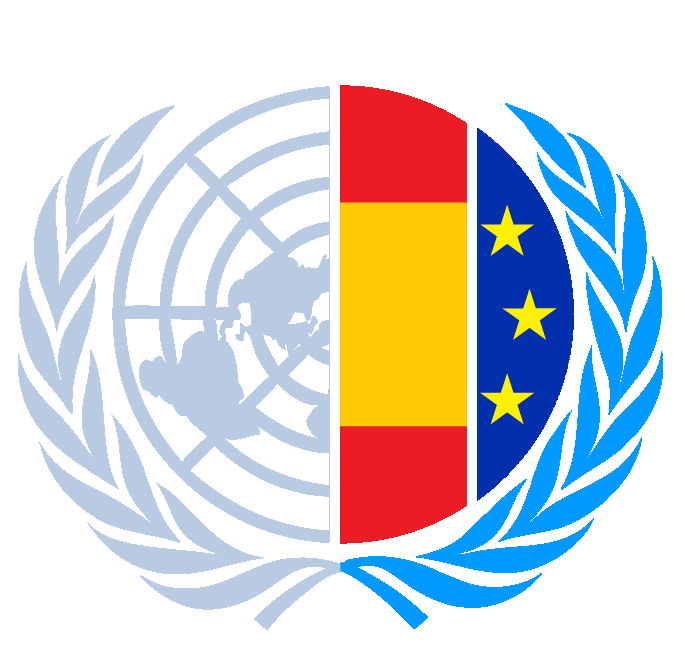
- Emblem of the Spanish Mission to the UN
- Incumbent; Marcos Gómez Martínez since 3 July 2024
- Ministry of Foreign Affairs; Secretariat of State for Foreign Affairs
- Style: His Excellency
- Member of: Permanent Mission of Spain to the United Nations in Geneva
- Residence: Geneva, Switzerland
- Nominator: The Foreign Minister
- Appointer: The Monarch
- Inaugural holder: Luis García de Llera y Rodríguez
- Formation: September 23, 1955; 70 years ago
- Website: Mission to the UN Geneva

The ambassador permanent representative of Spain to the United Nations Office and Other International Organizations in Geneva is the official representative of the Kingdom of Spain to the United Nations Office at Geneva. It also represents Spanish interests before the World Trade Organization (WTO), the European Organization for Nuclear Research (CERN), the International Committee of the Red Cross (ICRC) and the International Organization for Migration (IOM), among others, that are not part of the United Nations (UN).

The office was established on 23 September 1955, when Spain joined the United Nations and Luis García de Llera y Rodríguez, then Consul-General in Geneva, was appointed permanent delegate.

== Permanent Representation ==
As of 2025, it is formed by:

- The Permanent Representative, with the rank of Ambassador Extraordinary and Plenipotentiary.
- The Deputy Representative, with the rank of Ambassador.
- The Deputy Representative-Ambassador to the Conference on Disarmament, with the rank of Ambassador.
- The Deputy Representative for trade affairs. Not a diplomat, but a trade official.

Other government departments also have units in the Representation, led by government officials appointed by the competent minister, but reporting to the Ambassador Permanent Representative. These are:

- The Economic and Trade Office, led by the Deputy Representative for Trade Affairs, to issues regarding the World Trade Organization (WTO) and the UN Trade and Development (UNCTAD).
- The Office for Agriculture, Fisheries and Food, led by a Counsellor appointed by the minister of agriculture to follow affairs of the WTO related to trade negotiations, agriculture, fisheries, food, Uruguay Round, TRIPS Agreement (mainly about geographical indication). It also assists in matters related to Codex Alimentarius, the International Union for the Protection of New Varieties of Plants and the Ramsar Convention.
- The Office for Finance, led by a Counsellor appointed by the minister of finance to supervise the WTO affairs related to finance and taxes, the Committee of Experts on International Tax Cooperation of the United Nations Economic and Social Council, the WHO Framework Convention on Tobacco Control and the Inland Transport Committee of the United Nations Economic Commission for Europe. It also maintains close contacts with the Swiss Federal Department of Finance.
- The Office for Labour, Migration and Social Security, led by a Counsellor appointed by joint order of the ministers of labour and social security. It assists the permanent representative in the field of the International Labour Organization (ILO).

They are assisted by several diplomatic counsellors, trade officials and other civil servants, as well as a Chancellery.

== List of ambassadors ==
Ambassadors		Term		Head of State
Ambassadors		Start	End	Head of State
1	Luis García de Llera y Rodríguez	1955	1960	Francisco Franco
2	José Manuel Aniel-Quiroga y Redondo	1960	1964	Francisco Franco
3	José Antonio Giménez-Arnau	1964	1967	Francisco Franco
4	Enrique Pérez Hernández y Moreno	1967	1971	Francisco Franco
5	Fernando Benito Mestre	1971	1973	Francisco Franco
6	Miguel Solano Aza	1973	1977	Francisco Franco
7	Fernando Benito Mestre	1977	1981	Juan Carlos I
8	Enrique Domínguez Passier	1981	1983	Juan Carlos I
9	Alfonso de la Serna	1983	1986	Juan Carlos I
10	Emilio Artacho Castellano	1986	1991	Juan Carlos I
11	Fernando Martín Valenzuela Marzo	1991	1996	Juan Carlos I
12	Raimundo Pérez-Hernández Torra	1996	2000	Juan Carlos I
13	Joaquín Antonio Pérez-Villanueva y Tovar	2000	2004	Juan Carlos I
14	Juan Antonio March Pujol	2004	2008	Juan Carlos I
15	Javier Garrigues Flórez	2008	2011	Juan Carlos I
16	Agustín Santos Maraver	2011	2012	Juan Carlos I
17	Ana María Menéndez Pérez	2012	2017	Juan Carlos I
18	Cristóbal González-Aller Jurado	2017	2020	Felipe VI
19	Aurora Díaz-Rato Revuelta	2020	2024	Felipe VI
20	Marcos Gómez Martínez	2024		Felipe VI

== Deputies ==
As of 2025, there are three deputies to the permanent representative.

=== List of deputy ambassadors ===
- Joaquín María de Arístegui Laborde (2007–2008)
- Borja Montesino Martínez del Cerro (2008–2013)
- Victorio Redondo Baldrich (2013–2018)
- Carlos Domínguez Díaz (2018–2023)
- Clara Cabrera Brasero (since 2023)

=== List of deputy ambassadors for disarmament ===
- Luis Javier Gil Catalina (2009–2014)
- Julio Herráiz España (2015–2019)
- Ignacio Sánchez de Lerín García-Ovies (2019–2024)
- María Bassols Delgado (since 2024)

=== List of deputy ambassadors for trade ===
- Víctor Echeverría Ugarte (2011–2016)
- Alberto Sanz Serrano (2016–2020)
- Agustín Jaime Navarro de Vincente-Gella (2020–2025)
- María Pilar Morán Reyero (since 2025)
