= Jorge Moragas =

Spanish diplomat

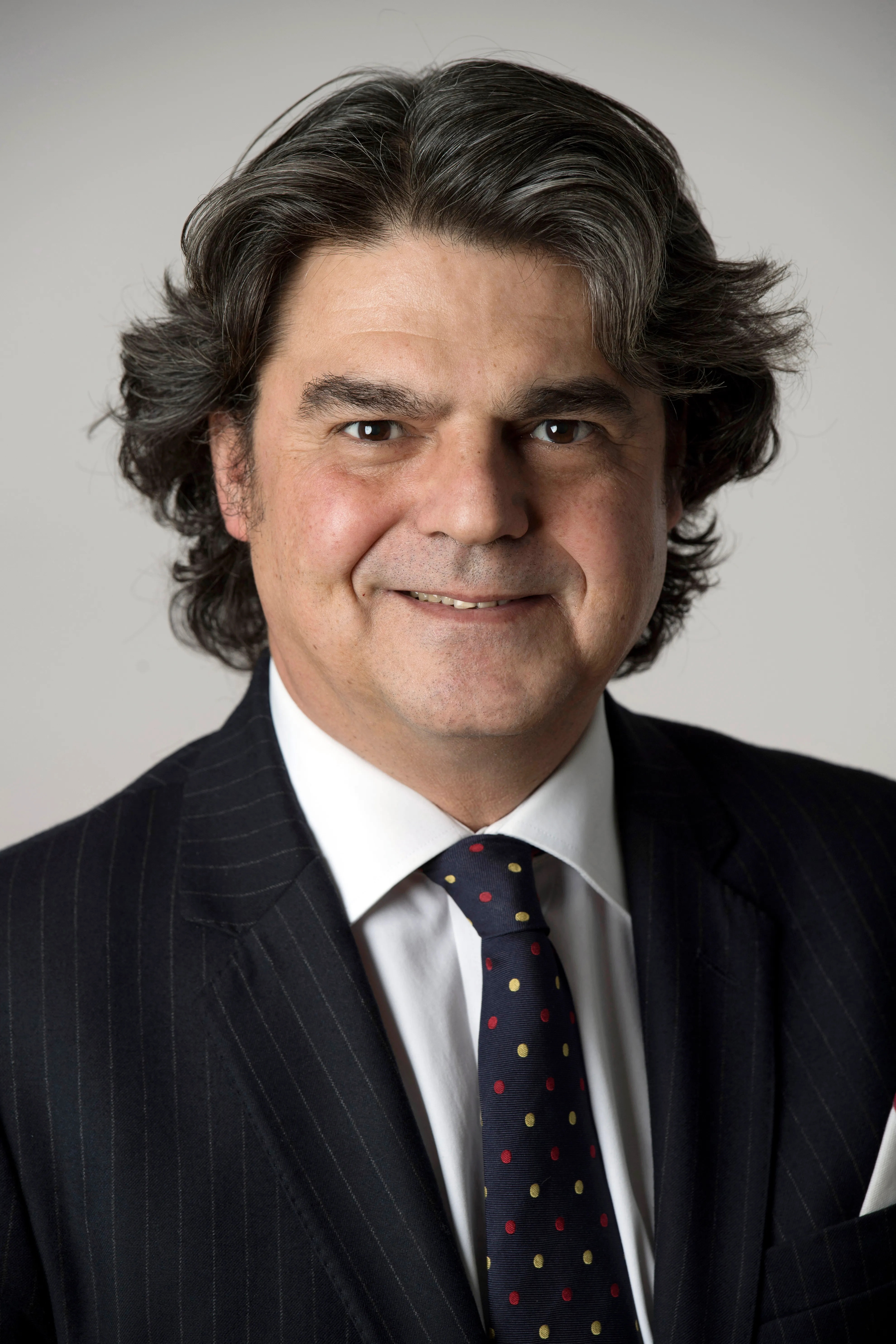
- Official portrait, 2018

Ambassador of Spain to the Philippines
- In office 21 September 2018 – 2 August 2022
- Monarch: Felipe VI
- President: Pedro Sánchez
- Preceded by: Luis Antonio Calvo Castaño
- Succeeded by: Miguel Utray Delgado

Permanent Representative of Spain to the United Nations
- In office 22 December 2017 – 4 August 2018
- Monarch: Felipe VI
- President: Mariano Rajoy; Pedro Sánchez
- Preceded by: Román Oyarzun Marchesi
- Succeeded by: Agustín Santos Maraver

9th Moncloa Chief of Staff
- In office 24 December 2011 – 22 December 2017
- Preceded by: José Enrique Serrano
- Succeeded by: José Luis Ayllón

Member of the Congress of Deputies
- In office 14 March 2004 – 28 December 2017
- Constituency: Barcelona

Personal details
- Born: 21 June 1965 (age 61) Barcelona, Spain
- Party: People's Party
- Education: University of Barcelona
- Profession: Diplomat and politician

Jorge Moragas Sánchez (born 21 June 1965) is a Spanish politician and diplomat, who last served as the Ambassador of Spain to the Philippines from 2018 to 2022. Married and father of two daughters, he was previously the Chief of Staff of the Spanish Prime Minister, Mariano Rajoy, as well as the Ambassador of Spain to the United Nations from 2017 to 2018.

== Early life and education ==
Graduated with a BA in law from the University of Barcelona, and after obtaining a diploma from the International Studies Center of Barcelona, he completed his education in Tours (France), at Drew University in the United States and at the Headquarters of the UN in New York City. He joined the Spanish Diplomatic Corps in 1995.

== Political career ==
After joining the Spanish Diplomatic Corps, Moragas was appointed adviser on protocol to the Presidency of the Government, holding the position from 1995 to 1998. He was then appointed director of the Cabinet of the Secretary General of the Presidency of the Government, where he served until 2002.

Moragas joined the People's Party in 2000 and two years later was selected to lead the International Relations Secretariat of the party, from where he directs all the external action of the party, its participation in the European People's Party and in international organizations such as the Centrist Democrat International or the International Democrat Union. He was also the coordinator of the international area of the party's electoral program for the 2004 and 2008 elections.

Moragas has represented Barcelona in the Congress of Deputies as a member of the People's Party since 2004. During his legislative career, Moragas has been a member of the Committee on Foreign Affairs, the Joint Commission for the European Union and the Committee on International Cooperation for Development. He has made more than twenty interventions in Parliament defending the principles and values of democracy, freedom and human rights in areas of the world where they are threatened. He has also promoted various initiatives on Cuba and Venezuela in the European Parliament.

In June 2008 he was appointed Coordinator of Presidency and of International Relations of the People's Party, where he is currently a member of the National Executive Committee. After the elections of 2011 he was appointed head of the Cabinet of the President of the Government of Spain, position that continues to hold today after his appointment in November 2016. Jorge Moragas is also Secretary of the National Security Council, body responsible for the elaboration of the National Security Strategy.

Mariano Rajoy appointed Moragas the director of the party's campaign for the general elections of 2015 and 2016,

== Honors and recognition ==
During the first years of his career, the Condor of the Andes in Degree of Comendador was imposed to him by the Government of Bolivia thanks to his work in order to strengthen the relations with Spain. He also received the Grand Cross Bernardo de O'Higgins from the Government of Chile. In the same way, in Spain was named Knight of the Order of Carlos III, of the Order of the Civil Merit and awarded with the Cross to the Military Merit.

In 2007, he received the Freedom Prize for his support for the transition to democracy in Cuba and to strengthen transatlantic relations, granted by the Florida Banking Association.

Already in his phase as Moncloa Chief of Staff, he is awarded the Agrarian Merit Award in 2013 for his decisive work in negotiating the 2014–2020 Multiannual Financial Framework, which is fundamental to Spanish agrarian interests. That same year, the Government of Colombia grants him the Grand Cross of the Order of San Carlos for promoting initiatives in favor of relations between both countries.

Later, in 2014, he is appointed Grand Officer of the Order of the Star of Italy and, in 2015, receives the Grand Cross of the Order of the Sun of Peru, for his role during the State Visit of the President of the Republic, as well as his role in strengthening the bilateral relationship between the two countries.

In March 2016 he was appointed Commander of the Legion of Honor of the French Republic.
