= Diane Nelson (businesswoman) =

American media executive

- Born: Diane Whelan; 1968 (age 57–58)
- Citizenship: American
- Education: Syracuse University
- Occupation: Business executive
- Known for: President of DC Entertainment; President and chief content officer, Warner Bros. Interactive Entertainment
- Spouse: Peter Nelson

Diane Whelan Nelson (born 1968) is an American business executive who was president of DC Entertainment from 2009 to 2018, and president and chief content officer of Warner Bros. Interactive Entertainment from 2013 to 2018.

== Early life ==
Diane Nelson was raised in Newport, Rhode Island. She received a bachelor's degree in liberal arts in 1989 from Syracuse University's Newhouse School of Communications. She met her husband Peter while both were attending Syracuse.

== Career ==
After working at Foote, Cone & Belding, Nelson served as Director of National Promotions for Walt Disney Records and moved to Warner Bros. in 1996, where she oversaw the cross-company brand management of the Harry Potter property. She became the executive vice president, Global Brand Management in May 2004.

In September 2009, Warner Bros. announced that DC Comics would become a subsidiary of DC Entertainment, Inc. and Nelson would serve as President of the new division. Nelson reported to Jeff Robinov, president of Warner Bros. Pictures Group. She appointed Jim Lee and Dan DiDio as Co-Publishers of DC Comics and Geoff Johns as chief creative officer on February 18, 2010.

After Kevin Tsujihara became chairman and CEO of Warner Bros. Entertainment, he promoted Nelson to the post of chief content officer of Warner Bros. Interactive Entertainment. In 2013, Nelson detailed some of the future film plans for DC properties and stated that a Sandman film will be "as rich as the Harry Potter universe." Later that year, Nelson announced the decision to relocate DC's offices from New York City to Burbank, California. She explained that "it was never optimal to run any business, but certainly not a creative business, on two coasts."

At a 2014 Time Warner shareholders meeting, Nelson addressed the need for greater visibility of female characters and creators in DC's comics and film and television projects. Earlier in the year, Nelson had described Wonder Woman as her favorite character, stating "I would be lying if I didn't admit that Wonder Woman has an affinity for me...She's an incredibly strong representative woman. So when I think about women in business and that balance between compassion and being a warrior, there's just a lot in the character that really resonates for me."

In August 2015, Nelson was given oversight over Warner Bros Consumer Products. Warner Bros CEO Kevin Tsujihara stated "Diane's background, which includes a great balance of business, creative and marketing, will help us bring fans exciting news ways to enjoy all of Warner Bros.' great entertainment properties through wide-reaching, innovative consumer products experiences."

After a leave of absence starting in March 2018, Nelson resigned as DC Entertainment president.

== Humanitarian work ==
Nelson oversees the "We Can Be Heroes" campaign which has raised more than $2.3 million as of 2013 for hunger and drought relief in the Horn of Africa. She serves on the board of directors for "There With Care", a nonprofit organization that supports families with children affected by critical illness.

Nelson, Wonder Woman actresses Gal Gadot and Lynda Carter, Wonder Woman (2017) director Patty Jenkins and U.N. Under-Secretary General Cristina Gallach appeared at the United Nations in October 2016, the 75th anniversary of the first appearance of Wonder Woman, to mark the character's designation by the United Nations as its "Honorary Ambassador for the Empowerment of Women and Girls". The gesture was intended to raise awareness of UN Sustainable Development Goal #5, which seeks to achieve gender equality and empower all women and girls by 2030.

== Awards and honors ==
In December 2013, The Hollywood Reporter ranked Nelson as #39 on its "2013 Women in Entertainment Power 100" list. In July 2017, Nelson received the Arents Award which is Syracuse University's highest alumni honor.

Preceded by Paul Levitz	President of DC Comics; 2009–2018	Succeeded by Jim Lee
