= Seventy-fifth session of the United Nations General Assembly =

Session of UNGA which ran from 16 September 2020 to 15 September 2021

- 16 September 2020 – 15 September 2021 75th session 75th general debate
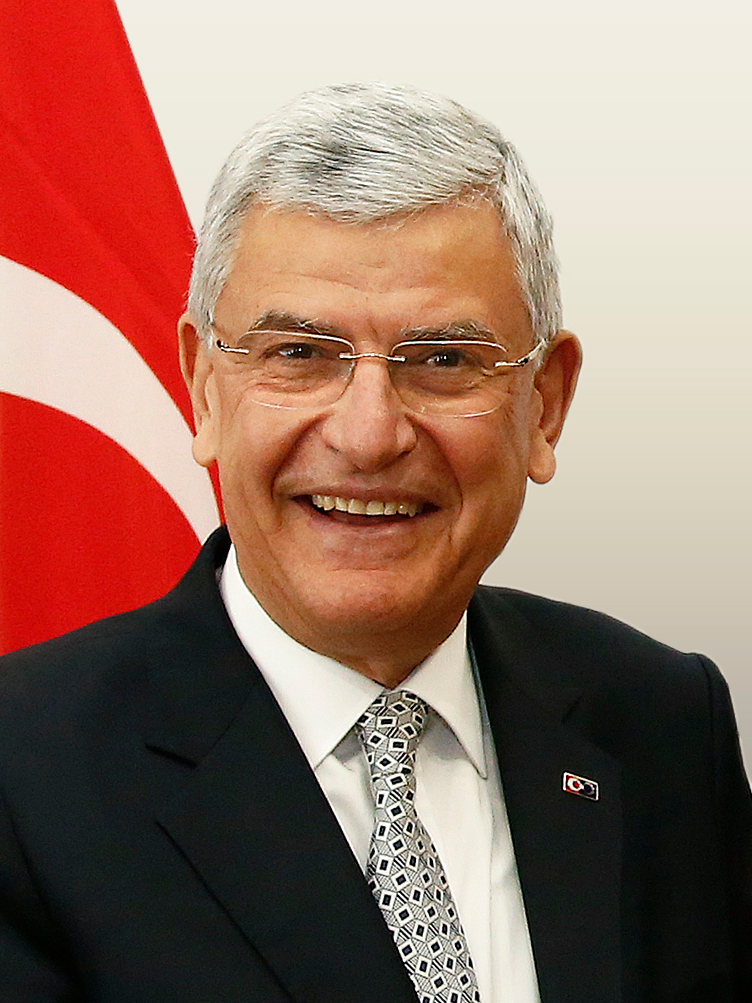
- President of the 75th General Assembly; Volkan Bozkır
- Host country: United Nations
- Cities: New York City, United States
- Venues: General Assembly Hall at the United Nations Headquarters
- Participants: United Nations Member States
- President: Volkan Bozkır
- Secretary-General: António Guterres
- Website: www.un.org/eng/ga

The Seventy-fifth session of the United Nations General Assembly was the session of the United Nations General Assembly which ran from 16 September 2020 to 15 September 2021. The President for the session was Volkan Bozkır, who stated that the session's theme was "The future we want, the United Nations we need; reaffirming our collective commitment to multilateralism".

== Organisation for the session ==
=== President ===
On 17 June 2020, Turkish diplomat, and former Minister of European Union Affairs, Volkan Bozkır was elected as President of the United Nations General Assembly. He was the sole candidate for the post and was elected by an overwhelming majority.

In his vision statement, Bozkır laid out some of his priorities for the session. Specifically, he pledged to underline the irreplaceable nature of the rules-based international system and of multilateralism, with the theme of the 75th session being selected as: "The future we want, the United Nations we need; reaffirming our collective commitment to multilateralism." He further pledged to give a voice to the most vulnerable, namely, refugees, immigrants, and stateless persons through the UN. In regard to the 2030 Agenda, he pledged to strengthen global partnership, paying special attention to Least Developed Countries that are falling behind on meeting their SDG obligations. Finally, he stated his commitment to improving the living standards and rights of women around the world by strengthening their status within society, and of achieving gender parity at all levels at the UN.

=== Vice-Presidents ===
The General Assembly elected the following countries as the vice-presidents of the 75th session:

The five permanent members of the Security Council:

- China
- France
- Russia
- United Kingdom of Great Britain and Northern Ireland
- United States of America

As well as the following nations:

- Afghanistan
- Albania
- Cambodia
- Eswatini
- Grenada
- Jordan
- Lebanon
- Libya
- Mali
- Morocco
- Pakistan
- Paraguay
- Peru
- Somalia
- Togo
- Turkmenistan

=== Committees ===
The following were elected Chairs and Officers of the General Assembly's Main Committees for the 75th Session:

First Committee (Disarmament and International Security)
Name	Country	Position
H.E. Agustín Santos Maraver	Spain	Chair
Bassem Hassan	Egypt	Vice-Chair
Ariel R. Penaranda	Philippines	Vice-Chair
Corina-Cristina Lefter	Romania	Vice-Chair
Maria del Rosario Estrada Giron	Guatemala	Rapporteur

Second Committee (Economic and Financial)
Name	Country	Position
H.E. Amrit Bahadur Rai	Nepal	Chair
Rosemary O'Hehir	Australia	Vice-Chair
Christine Bailey	Jamaica	Vice-Chair
Maria Danielcakova	Slovakia	Vice-Chair
Diamane Diome	Senegal	Rapporteur

Social, Humanitarian & Cultural Issues (Third Committee)
Name	Country	Position
H.E. Katalin Bogyay	Hungary	Chair
Ahlem Sara Charikhi	Algeria	Vice-Chair
Pilar Eugenio	Argentina	Vice-Chair
Khaled Mohammed AlManzlawiy	Saudi Arabia	Vice-Chair
Myriam Oehri	Liechtenstein	Rapporteur

Special Political and Decolonization (Fourth Committee)
Name	Country	Position
H.E. Collen Vixen Kelapile	Botswana	Chair
Darren Camilleri	Malta	Vice-Chair
Paul Hussar	Romania	Vice-Chair
Jose Osvaldo Sanabria Rivarola	Paraguay	Vice-Chair
Jassim Sayar A.J. Al-Maawda	Qatar	Rapporteur

Administrative and Budgetary Committee (Fifth Committee)
Name	Country	Position
H.E. Carlos Amorín	Uruguay	Chair
Katlego Boase Mmalane	Botswana	Vice-Chair
Jakub Krzysztof Chmielewski	Poland	Vice-Chair
Armağan Ayşe Can Crabtree	Turkey	Vice-Chair
Tsu Tang Terrence Teo	Singapore	Rapporteur

Sixth Committee (Legal)
Name	Country	Position
H.E. Milenko E Skoknic	Chile	Chair
Ghanshyam Bhandari	Nepal	Vice-Chair
Kristina Pelkiö	Czech Republic	Vice-Chair
Sarah Weiss Ma'udi	Israel	Vice-Chair
Solomon Korbieh	Ghana	Rapporteur

=== Seat allocation ===
As is tradition before each session of the General Assembly, the Secretary-General drew lots to see which member state would occupy the first seat in the General Assembly Chamber, with the other member states following according to the English translation of their name. For the 75th Session, Iceland was selected to sit in the first seat by Secretary-General António Guterres. This same order is followed in the six main committees, as well as other United Nations bodies.

=== Agenda ===
The agenda for the 75th session, as approved by the General Committee, is as follows:

- Promotion of sustained economic growth and sustainable development in accordance with the relevant resolutions of the General Assembly and recent United Nations conferences
- Maintenance of international peace and security
- Development of Africa
- Promotion of human rights
- Effective coordination of humanitarian assistance efforts
- Promotion of justice and international law
- Disarmament
- Drug control, crime prevention and combating international terrorism in all its forms and manifestations
- Organizational, administrative and other matters

New agenda items can also be included in this list if proposed by Member States. This is done via a formal submission of an agenda item by letter, which must be accompanied by an explanatory memorandum. However, this is rare and relies on the support of the General Committee.

=== General debate ===
Each member of the General Assembly had a representative speaking about issues concerning their country and the hopes for the coming year as to what the UNGA would do. This is an opportunity for the member states to opine on international issues of their concern. The General Debate occurred from the 22 of September until 29 September 2020.

The order of speakers is given first to member states, then observer states and supranational bodies. Any other observers entities will have a chance to speak at the end of the debate, if they so choose. Speakers will be put on the list in the order of their request, with special consideration for ministers and other government officials of similar or higher rank. According to the rules in place for the General Debate, the statements should be in of the United Nations official languages of Arabic, Chinese, English, French, Russian or Spanish, and will be translated by the United Nations translators. Each speaker is requested to provide 20 advance copies of their statements to the conference officers to facilitate translation and to be presented at the podium.

== See also ==
- List of UN General Assembly sessions
- List of General debates of the United Nations General Assembly
