= Peter Launsky-Tieffenthal =

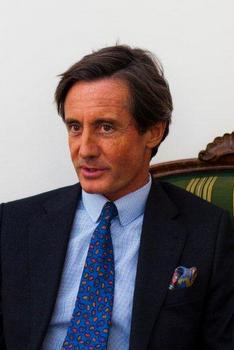

United Nations Under-Secretary-General for Communications and Public Information, Coordinator for Multilingualism
- In office August 2012 – January 2015
- Secretary-General: Ban Ki-moon
- Preceded by: Kiyotaka Akasaka
- Succeeded by: Cristina Gallach

Personal details
- Born: 30 November 1957 (age 68) Vienna, Austria

Peter Launsky-Tieffenthal served as the Under-Secretary-General for Public Information at the United Nations from August 2012 to January 2015, succeeding Kiyotaka Akasaka. He is also the United Nations Coordinator for Multilingualism, a position in which he coordinates the issue of multilingualism throughout the UN Secretariat.

Previously, as the spokesperson and head of the Department for Communication and Information of the Austrian Federal Ministry for European and International Affairs, he collaborated with approximately 100 national offices abroad to design, develop and implement an integrated and coherent message.

Prior to his appointment with the UN, Launsky-Tieffenthal held a variety of posts in which he oversaw the formulation of communications strategies with the application of various media tools. He was Head of Department for Press and Information at the Federal Ministry for European and International Affairs from September 2007 to August 2012.

From 2005 to 2007, he was Head of Department for Crisis Management and Citizens Services, Federal Ministry for Foreign Affairs, Vienna, Austria. In this position, he was involved in crisis management and negotiating international agreements.

His posts with the Austrian Foreign Service included a stint as consul-general in Los Angeles, California, United States, from 2000 to 2004. From 1996 to 2000, he was Deputy Chief of Mission of the Austrian Embassy in New Delhi, India.

Earlier in his diplomatic career, he had also been stationed in Riyadh, Saudi Arabia.

Before joining the Austrian Foreign Service, he worked for the International Finance Corporation in London, United Kingdom, and the Investkredit Bank in Vienna, Austria.
