= José María Robles Fraga =

Spanish politician & diplomat (born 1956)

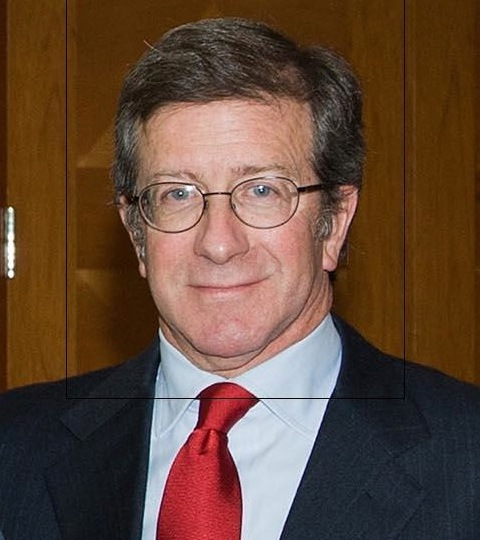

Member of the Congress of Deputies
- In office 29 June 1993 – 22 October 2001
- Constituency: Córdoba

Personal details
- Born: Bogotá, Colombia; 10 April 1956 (age 70)
- Party: People's Party

José María Robles Fraga (born 10 April 1956) is a Spanish politician and diplomat who represented Córdoba in the Congress of Deputies from 1993 to 2001.

He has served as ambassador to Russia, Pakistan, and Lithuania, among other destinations.

== Family ==
He was born in Bogotá in 1956. His father Carlos Robles Piquer and uncle Manuel Fraga Iribarne were also politicians.

== Other activities ==
- European Council on Foreign Relations (ECFR), Member

== Decorations ==
- Grand Cross of Aeronautical Merit, white decoration (2021)
