= José Félix de Lequerica y Erquiza =

Spanish lawyer, diplomat and politician

José Félix de Lequerica

José Félix de Lequerica y Erquiza (30 January 1891 in Bilbao, Spain – 9 June 1963) was a Spanish lawyer, diplomat and politician who served as Minister of Foreign Affairs between 1944 and 1945.

He had previously served as mayor of Bilbao between 1938 and 1939, during the Spanish Civil War. After the Nationalists won the war he was appointed ambassador to France between 1939 and 1944. He favored Nazi Germany during the Second World War, and wrote antisemitic reports about Prime Minister Édouard Daladier and his successor Paul Reynaud. Philippe Pétain later used de Lequerica as an intermediary to request an armistice from the Wehrmacht. During the last year of the war he was appointed Minister of Foreign Affairs, and severed diplomatic relations with Imperial Japan in retaliation for the Manila massacre. He went on to serve as ambassador to the United States between 1951 and 1954, and was influential in the drafting of the Pact of Madrid. He next served as Spain's permanent representative to the United Nations between 1956 and 1963.
