= Alison Smale =

British journalist

Alison Smale is a British journalist. From 2017 until 2019, she served as the Under-Secretary-General for Global Communications, United Nations Department of Public Information.

Appointed by United Nations Secretary-General António Guterres on 9 August 2017, Smale succeeded Cristina Gallach of Spain, who had served in the position from 4 December 2014 to 31 March 2017. Maher Nasser was appointed Acting Under-Secretary-General for Global Communications on 1 April 2017, while a replacement for Gallach was sought out. Born on 5 February 1955 (London, UK), Smale has almost 40-years of journalism experience gained in an international career that has included holding some of the most prestigious posts in the profession. In December 2008, Smale became the Executive Editor of the International Herald Tribune, after being promoted from Managing Editor, making her the first woman to be in charge of the paper. She is the former bureau chief of The New York Times in Berlin.

== Career ==
Smale was appointed the Under-Secretary-General for Global Communications, United Nations Department of Public Information by United Nations Secretary-General António Guterres on 9 August 2017.

Since August 2013, Smale served as chief correspondent for The New York Times for Germany and central and eastern Europe. In December 2008, she was the first woman to take up the post of Executive Editor at the International Herald Tribune in Paris. Prior, she had been the Deputy Foreign Editor at The New York Times. She organized much of the paper's coverage of the Iraq war and the war in Afghanistan.

In her reporting days, Smale worked for United Press International in Central Europe, then was The Associated Press bureau chief for Eastern Europe between 1987 and 1998, based in Vienna. In this capacity, she covered the rise of Slobodan Milosevic in Serbia and changes in Russia. She covered the anti-Communist revolutions in Eastern Europe and, on the night of the fall of the Berlin Wall in 1989, crossed Checkpoint Charlie along with the first East Germans to do so.

== Education ==
Smale graduated from the University of Bristol in 1977.

== Recognition ==
The Independent, in an article about the IHT's redesign in April 2009, which Smale oversaw, called her "the most powerful British female editor overseas."

She received the America Award of the Italy-USA Foundation in 2009. In that same year, she was awarded an honorary degree from the University of Bristol, of which she is an alumna.

== Other activities ==
- Hertie School of Governance, Member of the Board of Trustees (-2017)
