= List of ambassadors of Spain to Canada =

Ambassador of Spain to Canada
- Coat of arms of Spain
- Incumbent; María Luisa Benítez-Donoso Tarascón since 28 October 2026
- Ministry of Foreign Affairs; Secretariat of State for Foreign Affairs
- Style: The Most Excellent
- Residence: Ottawa
- Nominator: The Foreign Minister
- Appointer: The Monarch
- Term length: At the government's pleasure
- Inaugural holder: Mariano de Yturralde y Orbegoso
- Formation: 1953
- Website: Mission of Spain to Canada

The ambassador of Spain to Canada is the official representative of the Kingdom of Spain to Canada.

Canada and Spain signed their first trade agreements in the 1930s, although diplomatic relations were not formally established until 1953. In March 1953, Spain established an Embassy in Ottawa.

== List of ambassadors ==
Ambassador		Term	Nominated by	Appointed by	Accredited to
1	Mariano de Yturralde y Orbegoso	5 April 1953 – 9 November 1955 (2 years, 227 days)	Alberto Martín-Artajo	Francisco Franco	Vincent Massey
2	Eduardo Propper de Callejón	9 November 1955 – 4 January 1958 (2 years, 56 days)	Alberto Martín-Artajo	Francisco Franco	Vincent Massey
3	Juan de las Bárcenas y de la Huerta	4 January 1958 – 6 April 1962 (4 years, 92 days)	Fernando María Castiella	Francisco Franco	Vincent Massey
4	Félix de Iturriaga y Codes, Marquess of Romeral	6 April 1962 – 25 April 1964 (2 years, 19 days)	Fernando María Castiella	Francisco Franco	Georges Vanier
5	Francisco Javier Conde	25 April 1964 – 24 June 1969 (5 years, 60 days)	Fernando María Castiella	Francisco Franco	Georges Vanier
6	Juan José Rovira y Sánchez Herrero	13 November 1969 – 12 May 1973 (3 years, 180 days)	Fernando María Castiella	Francisco Franco	Roland Michener
7	José María Moro Martín-Montalbo	12 May 1973 – 17 July 1975 (2 years, 66 days)	Gregorio López-Bravo	Francisco Franco	Roland Michener
8	Enrique Domínguez Passier	17 July 1975 – 11 July 1979 (3 years, 359 days)	Pedro Cortina Mauri	Francisco Franco	Jules Léger
9	Antonio Elías Martinena	11 July 1979 – 30 January 1985 (5 years, 203 days)	The Marquess of Oreja	Juan Carlos I	Edward Schreyer
10	Francisco Javier Oyarzun Iñarra	18 February 1985 – 9 February 1987 (1 year, 356 days)	Fernando Morán	Juan Carlos I	Jeanne Sauvé
11	Antonio José Fournier Bermejo	9 February 1987 – 21 May 1991 (4 years, 101 days)	Francisco Fernández Ordóñez	Juan Carlos I	Jeanne Sauvé
12	Eugenio Bregolat	16 July 1991 – 18 February 1992 (217 days)	Francisco Fernández Ordóñez	Juan Carlos I	Ray Hnatyshyn
13	José Luis Pardos	18 February 1992 – 24 February 1996 (4 years, 6 days)	Francisco Fernández Ordóñez	Juan Carlos I	Ray Hnatyshyn
14	Fernando Martín Valenzuela Marzo	24 February 1996 – 13 March 1999 (3 years, 18 days)	Carlos Westendorp	Juan Carlos I	Roméo LeBlanc
15	José Cuenca Anaya	13 March 1999 – 17 May 2003 (4 years, 65 days)	Abel Matutes	Juan Carlos I	Roméo LeBlanc
16	José Ignacio Carbajal Gárate	17 May 2003 – 28 June 2005 (2 years, 42 days)	Ana Palacio	Juan Carlos I	Adrienne Clarkson
17	Mariano Alonso-Burón Aberasturi	28 June 2005 – 31 January 2009 (3 years, 217 days)	Miguel Ángel Moratinos	Juan Carlos I	Adrienne Clarkson
18	Eudaldo Mirapeix	31 January 2009 – 26 May 2012 (3 years, 116 days)	Miguel Ángel Moratinos	Juan Carlos I	Michaëlle Jean
19	Carlos Gómez-Múgica	26 May 2012 – 11 March 2017 (4 years, 289 days)	José Manuel García-Margallo	Juan Carlos I	David Johnston
20	Enrique Ruiz Molero	22 April 2017 – 29 September 2021 (4 years, 160 days)	Alfonso Dastis	Felipe VI	David Johnston
21	Alfredo Martínez Serrano	29 September 2021 – 28 October 2026 (5 years, 29 days)	José Manuel Albares	Felipe VI	Mary Simon
22	María Luisa Benítez-Donoso Tarascón	28 October 2026 – present (5 years, 32 days)	José Manuel Albares	Felipe VI	Louise Arbour

== See also ==
- Canada–Spain relations
