= Permanent Representative of Spain to the United Nations =

Senior diplomat

Ambassador Permanent Representative of Spain to the United Nations
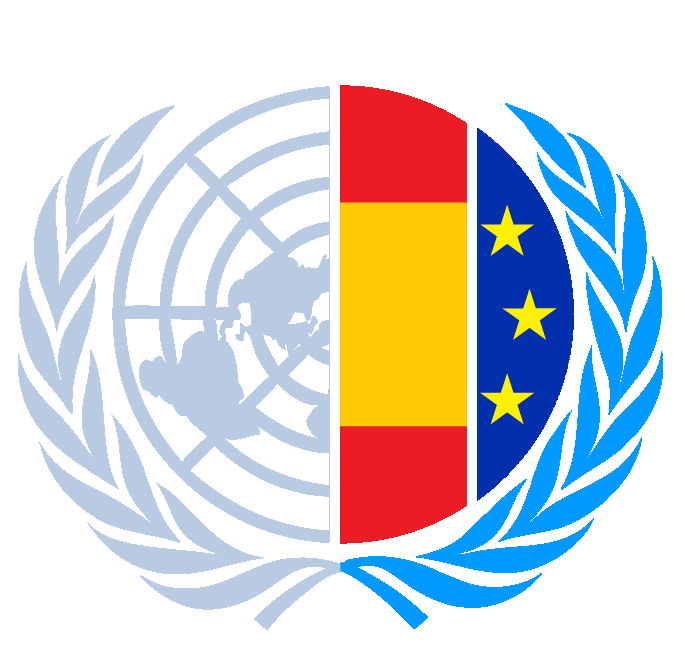
- Emblem of the Spanish Mission to the UN

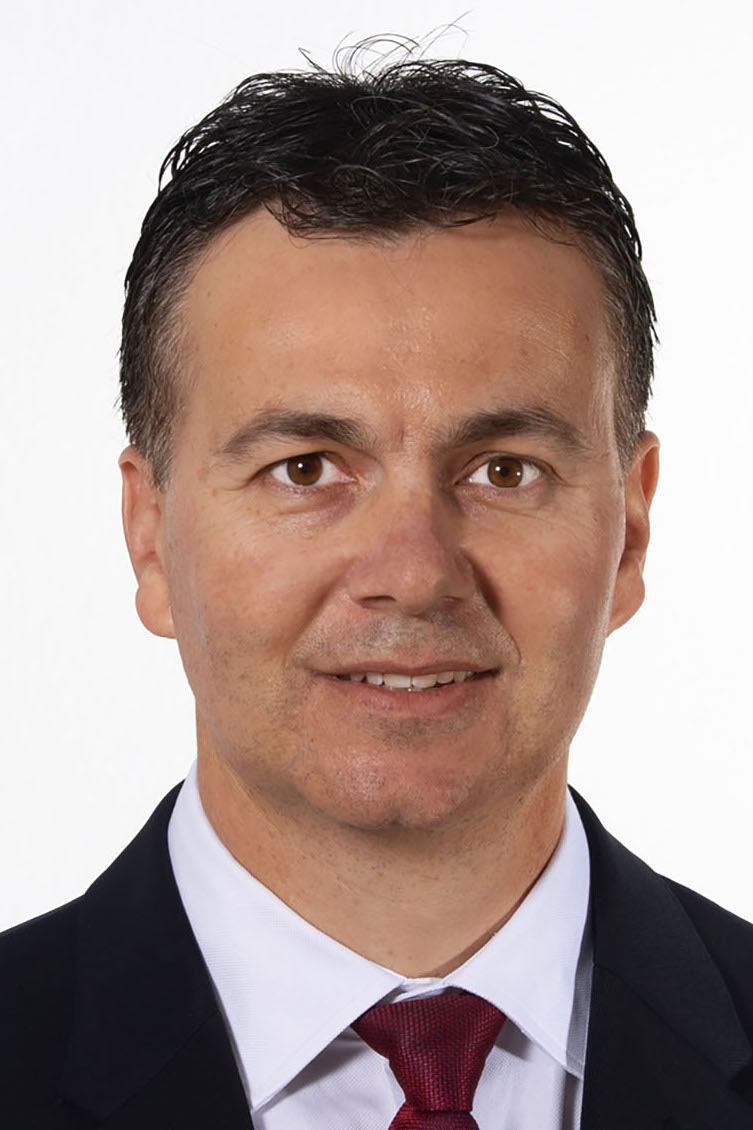
- Incumbent; Héctor Gómez Hernández since 5 December 2023
- Ministry of Foreign Affairs; Secretariat of State for Foreign Affairs
- Style: His Excellency
- Member of: Permanent Mission of Spain to the United Nations
- Residence: New York City
- Nominator: The Foreign Minister
- Appointer: The Monarch
- Inaugural holder: José Félix de Lequerica y Erquiza
- Formation: January 1, 1956; 70 years ago
- Website: Mission of Spain to the UN

The ambassador permanent representative of Spain to the United Nations is the official representative of the Kingdom of Spain to the United Nations (UN) based in New York City, United States. This permanent representation, unlike the Permanent Representation of Spain to the European Union, does not have its own legislation and is regulated by the general regulations governing diplomatic missions, by international law and by the internal law of the UN.

The United Nations has several headquarters in different countries. This position should not be confused with that of the ambassadors posted in Geneva, Nairobi, Rome and Vienna.

As of 7 September 2026, the current permanent representative of Spain to the United Nations is Héctor Gómez Hernández, who previously served as minister of Industry, Trade and Tourism from March to November 2023.

== Permanent Mission of Spain to the United Nations ==
The Permanent Mission of Spain to the United Nations is the organization within the Spanish Foreign Service in charge of representing Spain before the UN and defending its interests and those of its citizens. It is also in charge of developing international relations with the UN, conducting the necessary negotiations and cooperating with the European External Action Service for the promotion and defense of the interests of the Union.

The Permanent Mission consists of the Permanent Representative, the Deputy Permanent Representative and the Chancellery. In addition, it is also made up of councillors, attachés, Sectoral Offices, Economic and Commercial Offices, Technical Cooperation Offices, Cultural Centers, Spanish Cooperation Training Centers, as well as the Cervantes Institute and, where appropriate, the Common Services Section.

The permanent representative, which is organizationally and functionally dependent on the Ministry of Foreign Affairs, represents the General State Administration as a whole, is the superior head of all the personnel of the Mission, directs the same and coordinates the Spanish External Action and the Foreign Service at the UN.

It works in close collaboration with the Secretary of State for Foreign Affairs and the Directorate-General for the United Nations, International Organizations and Human Rights.

== Origin ==
The Permanent Representation of Spain to the United Nations was approved by the Council of Ministers on December 23, 1955, and came into force on January 1 of the following year. It was established to represent Spain at the headquarters of the United Nations in New York and all its agencies, as a consequence of the country's entry into the organization on December 14, 1955.

== List of ambassadors ==
For the purposes of this list, the date of publication of the appointment or dismissal in the Official State Gazette is taken into account.

Ambassador (Birth–Death)		Mandato			Prime Minister (Tenure)	Head of State (Tenure)	Ref.
Ambassador (Birth–Death)		Took office	Left office	Duration	Prime Minister (Tenure)	Head of State (Tenure)	Ref.
1	José Félix de Lequerica y Erquiza (1890–1963)	1 January 1956	9 June 1963†	7 years, 159 days	Francisco Franco (1939–1975)		
2	Manuel Aznar Zubigaray (1894–1975)	22 February 1964	25 September 1967	3 years, 215 days	Francisco Franco (1939–1975)		
3	Jaime de Piniés (1917–2003)	26 October 1968	4 March 1972	3 years, 130 days	Francisco Franco (1939–1975)		
4	Jaime Alba Delibes (1908–1998)	18 March 1972	20 August 1973	1 year, 155 days	Francisco Franco (1939–1975)		
4	Jaime Alba Delibes (1908–1998)	18 March 1972	20 August 1973	1 year, 155 days	Luis Carrero Blanco (1973)		
5	Jaime de Piniés (1917–2003)	20 August 1973	30 August 1985	12 years, 10 days	Luis Carrero Blanco (1973)		
5	Jaime de Piniés (1917–2003)	20 August 1973	30 August 1985	12 years, 10 days	Carlos Arias Navarro (1973–1976)		
5	Jaime de Piniés (1917–2003)	20 August 1973	30 August 1985	12 years, 10 days	Carlos Arias Navarro (1973–1976)	Juan Carlos I (1975–2014)	
5	Jaime de Piniés (1917–2003)	20 August 1973	30 August 1985	12 years, 10 days	Adolfo Suárez (1976–1981)	Juan Carlos I (1975–2014)	
5	Jaime de Piniés (1917–2003)	20 August 1973	30 August 1985	12 years, 10 days	Leopoldo Calvo-Sotelo (1981–1982)	Juan Carlos I (1975–2014)	
5	Jaime de Piniés (1917–2003)	20 August 1973	30 August 1985	12 years, 10 days	Felipe González (1982–1996)	Juan Carlos I (1975–2014)	
6	Fernando Morán (1926–2020)	6 December 1985	30 April 1987	1 year, 145 days	Felipe González (1982–1996)	Juan Carlos I (1975–2014)	
7	Francisco Villar y Ortiz de Urbina (born 1945)	30 April 1987	15 March 1991	3 years, 319 days	Felipe González (1982–1996)	Juan Carlos I (1975–2014)	
8	Juan Antonio Yáñez-Barnuevo (born 1942)	29 April 1991	1 June 1996	5 years, 33 days	Felipe González (1982–1996)	Juan Carlos I (1975–2014)	
9	Carlos Westendorp (1937–2026)	1 June 1996	28 June 1997	1 year, 27 days	José María Aznar (1996–2004)	Juan Carlos I (1975–2014)	
10	Inocencio Arias (born 1940)	25 July 1997	20 April 2004	6 years, 270 days	José María Aznar (1996–2004)	Juan Carlos I (1975–2014)	
11	Juan Antonio Yáñez-Barnuevo (born 1942)	20 April 2004	6 November 2010	6 years, 200 days	José Luis Rodríguez Zapatero (2004–2011)	Juan Carlos I (1975–2014)	
12	Juan Pablo de Laiglesia (1948–2022)	6 November 2010	11 February 2012	1 year, 97 days	José Luis Rodríguez Zapatero (2004–2011)	Juan Carlos I (1975–2014)	
12	Juan Pablo de Laiglesia (1948–2022)	6 November 2010	11 February 2012	1 year, 97 days	Mariano Rajoy (2011–2018)	Juan Carlos I (1975–2014)	
13	Fernando Arias (born 1952)	11 February 2012	9 November 2013	1 year, 271 days	Mariano Rajoy (2011–2018)	Juan Carlos I (1975–2014)	
14	Román Oyarzun Marchesi (born 1957)	9 November 2013	23 December 2017	4 years, 44 days	Mariano Rajoy (2011–2018)	Juan Carlos I (1975–2014)	
14	Román Oyarzun Marchesi (born 1957)	9 November 2013	23 December 2017	4 years, 44 days	Mariano Rajoy (2011–2018)	Felipe VI (2014–present)	
15	Jorge Moragas (born 1965)	23 December 2017	4 August 2018	224 days	Mariano Rajoy (2011–2018)	Felipe VI (2014–present)	
15	Jorge Moragas (born 1965)	23 December 2017	4 August 2018	224 days	Pedro Sánchez (2018–present)	Felipe VI (2014–present)	
16	Agustín Santos Maraver (born 1955)	4 August 2018	14 June 2023	4 years, 314 days	Pedro Sánchez (2018–present)	Felipe VI (2014–present)	
17	Héctor Gómez Hernández (born 1978)	6 December 2023	Incumbent	2 years, 275 days	Pedro Sánchez (2018–present)	Felipe VI (2014–present)	

== List of deputy ambassadors ==
- Ana María Menéndez Pérez (8 February 2003 – 20 April 2004)
- Íñigo de Palacio España (20 April 2004 – 19 July 2008)
- Román Oyarzun Marchesi (19 July 2008 – 6 March 2012)
- Manuel González de Linares Palou (27 July 2012 – 25 August 2017)
- María Bassols Delgado (25 August 2017 – August 2022)
- Ana Jiménez de la Hoz (August 2022 – )

== See also ==
- Spain and the United Nations
- Foreign relations of Spain
