= Héctor Gómez Hernández =

Spanish politician (born 1978)

The Most Excellent Héctor Gómez
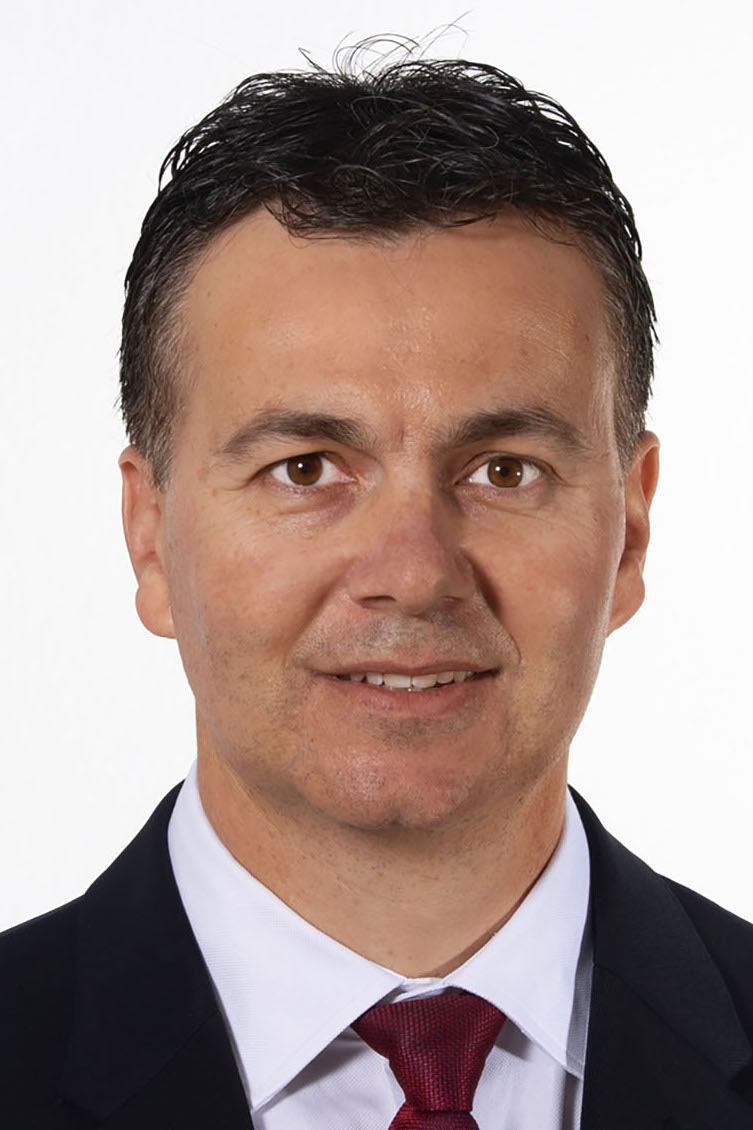
- Héctor Gómez in 2023

Ambassador Permanent Representative of Spain to the United Nations
- Incumbent
- Assumed office 6 December 2023
- Preceded by: Agustín Santos Maraver

Minister of Industry, Trade and Tourism
- In office 28 March 2023 – 21 November 2023
- Monarch: Felipe VI
- Prime Minister: Pedro Sánchez
- Preceded by: Reyes Maroto
- Succeeded by: Jordi Hereu

Member of the Congress of Deputies
- In office 21 May 2019 – 6 December 2023
- Constituency: Santa Cruz de Tenerife

Personal details
- Born: Héctor Gómez Hernández; 16 November 1978 (age 48) Santa Cruz de Tenerife, Spain
- Party: PSOE
- Occupation: Politician

Héctor Gómez Hernández (Santa Cruz de Tenerife, 16 November 1978) is a Spanish politician of the Spanish Socialist Party who served as minister of Industry, Trade and Tourism in 2023.

He also served as member of the Congress of Deputies, representing Santa Cruz de Tenerife, from May 2019 to December 2023.

Since December 2023 he has served as Ambassador Permanent Representative of Spain to the United Nations.

Political offices
Preceded by Reyes Maroto	Minister of Industry, Trade and Tourism; 2023–2023	Incumbent
