= Fernando Martín Valenzuela Marzo =

Spanish diplomat

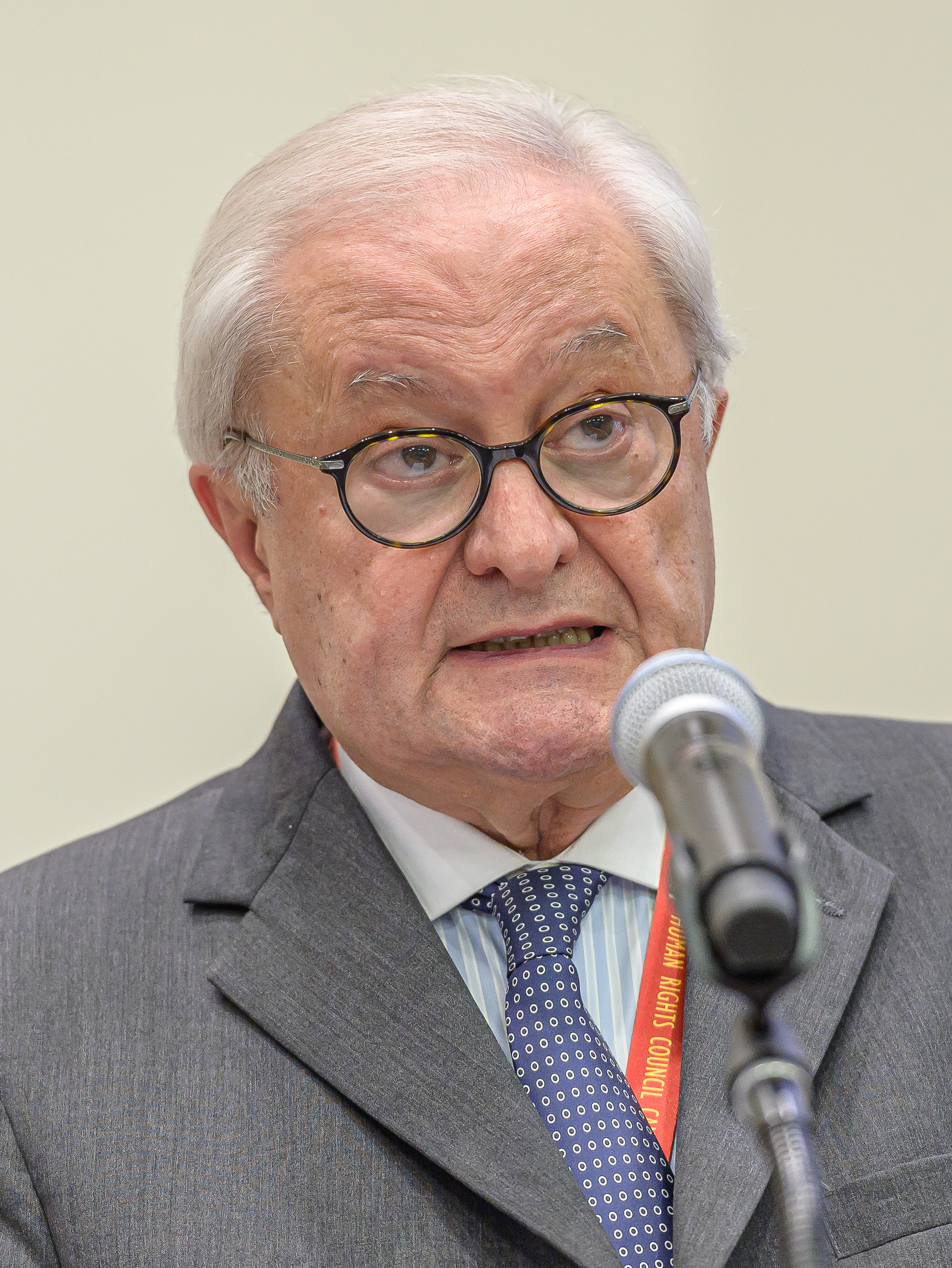

Personal details
- Born: 12 November 1948 (age 77) Montalbán, Spain
- Education: University of Zaragoza; Diplomatic School
- Occupation: Diplomat

Fernando Martín-Valenzuela Marzo (born 1948) is a Spanish diplomat. He served as Secretary of State for Foreign Affairs from 2018 to 2020.

== Biography ==
Born in Montalbán (province of Teruel) on 12 November 1948, he earned a licentiate degree in Law from the University of Zaragoza and a diploma in International Studies from the Diplomatic School, joining the diplomatic corps in 1974. Martín-Valenzuela, who was appointed as chairman and CEO of the Spanish Agency for International Development Cooperation (AECID) in 1989, left the later post in 1991, becoming the Spanish permanent representative to the United Nations and other organizations in Geneva. He served as ambassador to Canada from 1996 to 1999.

Following the investiture of Pedro Sánchez as Prime Minister in June 2018, Valenzuela was appointed as secretary of state for foreign affairs of the Ministry of Foreign Affairs, European Union and Cooperation (second to Minister Josep Borrell in the informal hierarchy). He assumed office on 27 June 2018. Valenzuela left the office on 5 February 2020, being replaced by Cristina Gallach.

Non-profit organization positions
Preceded by -	President of the Spanish Agency for International Development Cooperation; 1989–1991	Succeeded by Alfonso Fidel Carbajo Isla
Diplomatic posts
Preceded by José Luis Pardos Pérez	Ambassador of Spain to Canada; 1996–1999	Succeeded by José Cuenca Anaya
Preceded by Ildefonso Castro López	Secretary of State for Foreign Affairs; 2018–2020	Succeeded by Cristina Gallach
