= List of ambassadors of Spain to Poland =

Ambassador of Spain to Poland
- Coat of arms of Spain
- Incumbent; Victoria Ortega Gutiérrez since 17 December 2025
- Ministry of Foreign Affairs; Secretariat of State for the European Union
- Style: The Most Excellent
- Residence: Warsaw
- Nominator: The Foreign Minister
- Appointer: The Monarch
- Term length: At the government's pleasure
- Inaugural holder: Maximiliano de Bergkcz
- Formation: 1519
- Website: Mission of Spain to Poland

The ambassador of Spain to Poland is the official representative of the Kingdom of Spain to the Republic of Poland.

Although there had been some sporadic contacts previously, Poland and Spain began to maintain regular relations during the reign of Charles I (V of the Holy Roman Empire). These relations broke down after the third and final partition of the Polish–Lithuanian Commonwealth, which meant its dissolution. Diplomatic ties were once more established with the Second Polish Republic until 1939, when Nazi Germany invaded the country. Finally, current diplomatic relations exists since 1977, when Spain transitioned to democracy and re-established ties with numerous countries, including communist countries like the Polish People's Republic.

== List of ambassadors ==
This list was compiled using the work "History of the Spanish Diplomacy" by the Spanish historian and diplomat Miguel Ángel Ochoa Brun. The work covers up to the year 2000, so the rest is based on appointments published in the Boletín Oficial del Estado.

Name	Rank	Term
Maximiliano de Bergkcz	Ambassador	1519
Andrea del Burgo	Ambassador	1519
Wilhelm von Roggendorf	Co-ambassadors	1520
Sebastian Sprenz	Co-ambassadors	1520
Antonio de Conti	Ambassador	1523
Carlos Felipe de Borgoña	Ambassador	1524
Leonardo de Nogarolles	Ambassador	1526
Cornelis de Schepper	Ambassador	1528
John, Margrave of Brandenburg-Küstrin	Ambassador	1543
Adam Karolyi	Ambassador	1543
Juan Lange	Ambassador	1545
William of Waldburg	Extraordinary Ambassador	1548
Sigismund von Herberstein	Co-ambassadors	1550
Juan Lange	Co-ambassadors	1550
Juan de Ayala	Ambassador	1555
Pedro II Fajardo, Marquess of Los Vélez	Extraordinary Ambassador	1573
Guillén de San Clemente y de Centelles	Extraordinary Ambassador	1578–1579
Pedro Cornejo	Agent	1583
Guillén de San Clemente y de Centelles	Extraordinary Ambassador	1587
Vespasiano I Gonzaga	Extraordinary Ambassador	1588
Francisco de Mendoza, Admiral of Aragon	Extraordinary Ambassador	1597
Luis Enríquez de Cabrera y Mendoza, Duke of Medina de Rioseco	Ambassador	1597
Claude Lamoral, 3rd Prince of Ligne	Extraordinary Ambassador	1600
Girolamo Morone	Extraordinary Ambassador	1611
Abraham von Dohna	Ambassador	1611–1612
Jean de Croÿ, Count of Solre	Ambassador	1626
Charles de Bonnières, Baron of Auchy	Ambassador	1626–1629
Gabriel de Roy	Ambassador	1627–1632
Juan de Velasco, Count of Siruela	Ambassador	1633
Charles de Bonnières, Baron of Auchy	Ambassador	1633–1635
Jean de Croÿ, Count of Solre	Ambassador	1635
Alonso Vázquez de Miranda	Extraordinary Ambassador	1635
Ercole Visconti	Extraordinary Ambassador	1635
Agustín Navarro Burena	Envoy	1639
Maximilian, Prince of Dietrichstein	Extraordinary Ambassador	1644–1645
Charles de Bonnières, Baron of Auchy	Ambassador	1644; 1647
Allegretto Allegretti	Agent	1648–1650
François-Paul de Lisola	Minister	1648–1651
Francisco de Moura Corte Real, Marquess of Castelo Rodrigo	Minister	1648–1651
Juan María de Borja y Aragón	Minister	1651–1652
Gaspar de Teves y Tello de Guzmán, Marquess of La Fuente	Minister	1656–1661
Fray Tommaso de Sarria	Co-ambassadors	1660
Hércules Visconti	Co-ambassadors	1660
Sebastián de Luciani	Chargé d'affaires	1661
Ferdinand Bonaventura I, Count Harrach	Extraordinary Ambassador	1669
Francisco Gutiérrez de los Ríos, Count of Fernán Núñez	Extraordinary Ambassador	1670
Pedro Ronquillo Briceño	Ambassador	1674–1675
Leopoldo de Montecúcoli	Extraordinary Ambassador	1683
Wilhelm Ludwig von Berlepsch, Baron of Berlepsch	Extraordinary Ambassador	1694
Father Francisco Arcelli	Agent and later Minister	1731–1738
Pedro Cebrián, 5th Count of Fuenclara	Ambassador	1737–1738
Cristóbal Gregorio Portocarrero, 5th Count of Montijo	Ambassador	1742
Jacinto Ferrero Fieschi y de Saboya, Counf of Bena	Minister	1745–1749
Pedro Pablo Abarca de Bolea, 10th Count of Aranda	Extraordinary Ambassador	1760–1762
José de Onís	Chargé d'affaires	1762
José de Onís	Minister	1774–1783
Francisco de Tutavilla y del Rufo, Duque de San Germán	Ambassador	1763–1764
Toribio Ventura de la Cruz Gasca de la Vega, Marquess of Revilla	Ambassador	1763
Pedro Normande y Merican	Minister	1790–1791
Miguel Cuber y Aniñón	Minister	1791–1793
Leonardo Gómez de Terán y Negrete	Chargé d'affaires	1793–1794
Domingo d'Yriarte	Minister	1793–1794
Dissolution of the Polish–Lithuanian Commonwealth
Fernando Gómez Contreras	Chargé d'affaires	1919–1920
Francisco Gutiérrez de Agüera y Bayo	Acting Minister	1920–1926
Alfredo de Mariátegui y Carratalá	Minister	1926
Silvio Fernández-Vallín y Alfonso	Minister	1926–1931
Francisco Serrat y Bonastre	Minister	1931; 1933–1936
José Gil Delgado y Olazábal	Minister	1931–1932
Mariano Ruiz-Funes	Chargé d'affaires (Note: Representing the Republican government.)	1937
Manuel Martínez Aguilar y de Pedroso	Minister	1937–1938
José Medina Echavarría	Chargé d'affaires	1938
Juan Serrat y Valera	Chargé d'affaires (Note: Representing the Junta Técnica del Estado (1937–1938) and the first government of Francisco Franco (1938–1939).)	1937–1939
Luis del Pedroso y Madam	Minister	1939
Nazi invasion of Poland
Emilio Beladíez Navarro	Head of Consular and Trade Relations	1969–1974
Jesús Millaruelo Cleméntez	Head of Consulate	1975–1977
Jesús Millaruelo Cleméntez	Ambassador	1977–1978
José Joaquín Zavala Alcíbar-Jáuregui	Ambassador	1978–1982
Jesús Villacieros Machimbarrena	Ambassador	1982–1986
Fernando Olivié González-Pumariega	Ambassador	1986–1991
José Antonio López Zatón	Ambassador	1991–1993
Fernando Riquelme Lidón	Ambassador	1993–1998
Juan Pablo de Laiglesia	Ambassador	1998–2003
Miguel Ángel Navarro Portera	Ambassador	2003–2004
Rafael Mendívil Peydro	Ambassador	2004–2008
Francisco Fernández Fábregas	Ambassador	2008–2012
Agustín Núñez Martínez	Ambassador	2012–2017
Francisco Javier Sanabria Valderrama	Ambassador	2017–2022
Ramiro Fernández Bachiller	Ambassador	2022–2025
Victoria Ortega Gutiérrez	Ambassador	2025–pres.

== See also ==
- Poland–Spain relations
