= Spanish question (United Nations) =

Attitude in the beginning of the international organization towards Franco Spain

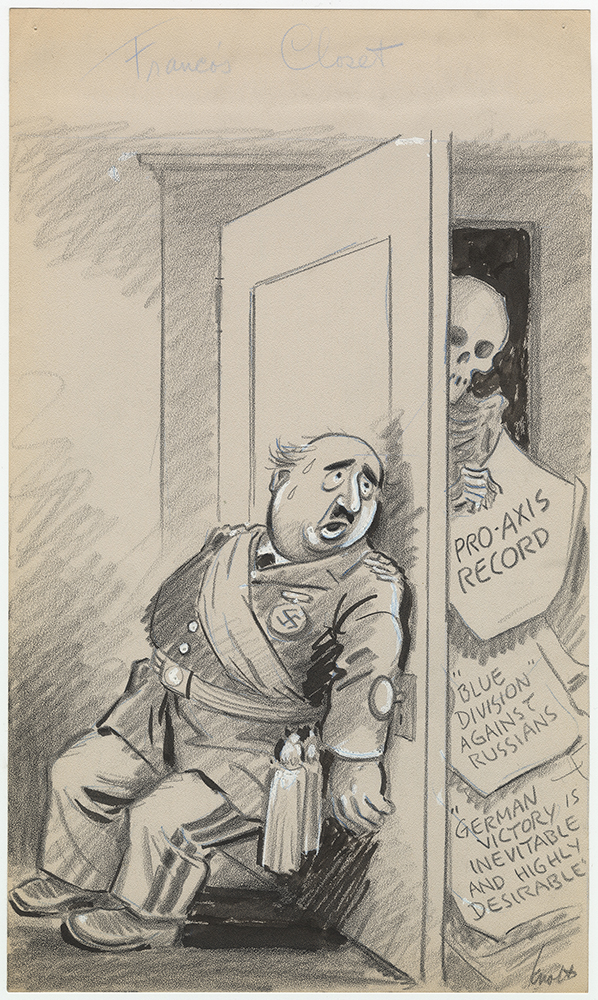
An American cartoon from 1945 depicts Francisco Franco attempting to stop his "pro-Axis record", and other evidence of pro-Nazi sympathies, escaping alongside the skeleton in the closet.

The Spanish question (Spanish: cuestión española) was the set of geopolitical and diplomatic circumstances that marked the relationship between Spain and the United Nations between 1945 and 1955, centred on the UN's refusal to admit Spain to the organization due to Francoist Spain's sympathy for the Axis powers, defeated in World War II.

== Background ==
When World War II began on September 1, 1939, Francoist Spain proclaimed that Spain would remain neutral. The German victories over the Benelux countries and France in June 1940 and Italy's entry into the war on the German side (on June 10), however, changed the situation. On June 13, 1940, when the Germans were about to enter Paris, Franco abandoned "strict neutrality" and declared himself "non-belligerent", which was the status that Italy had before entering the war. The next day Spanish troops occupied Tangier, an international city that was de facto incorporated to the Spanish Protectorate of Morocco. In late June 1941, the Francoist regime decided to participate in the "anti-communist crusade", the invasion of the USSR by the Axis, by sending a Spanish infantry division composed of volunteers, known as the Blue Division, to the Russian front.

In November 1942 British and American troops landed in North Africa to dislodge the German Afrika Korps and the Italian troops. For Franco it was the end of his putative aspirations of conquest and a possible risk of invasion by the allies given their alignment with Germany and Italy. It was not until the fall of Mussolini in July 1943, after the allied landing in Sicily, that General Franco returned to "strict neutrality" against his wishes, ordering in November the withdrawal of the Blue Division from the Russian front.

Due to Franco's sympathy with the Axis powers, the winners of the war excluded Spain from the post-war international order.

== Origins ==
The Spanish question arose at the San Francisco Conference. During that conference, on the initiative of the delegations of Australia and Mexico, a motion was adopted which, without explicitly mentioning Spain, referred to it with these terms:

"It is the understanding of the Delegation of Mexico that paragraph 2 of Chapter III cannot be applied to the states whose regimes have been established with the help of military forces belonging to the countries which have waged war against the United Nations, as long as those regimes are in power.

Spain was not present at the conference. However, prominent Spanish Republican leaders did attend the conference, exerting a notorious influence on several delegations, extended to the conditions of entry into the United Nations.

At the Potsdam Conference, the question of how to proceed with post-war Spain was one of the first to be dealt with. In this sense, Stalin was, in a certain way, seeking revenge against the Francoist State, due in part to the fact that the State had sent the Blue Division (volunteers fighting with the German armed forces) to the Soviet Union during World War II.

At this conference, the three winning powers in World War II (the United States, the United Kingdom and the Soviet Union) issued a statement on the matter:

"The three Governments feel bound however to make it clear that they for their part would not favour any application for membership put forward by the present Spanish Government, which, having been founded with the support of the Axis Powers, does not, in view of its origins, its nature, its record and its close association with the aggressor States, possess the qualifications necessary to justify such membership."

== Resolution 39 ==
UN General Assembly Resolution 39
- Date: December 12 1946
- Meeting no.: 59
- Code: A/RES/39 (I) (Document)
- Subject: Relations of members of the United Nations with Spain
- Voting summary: 34 voted for; 6 voted against; 13 abstained
- Result: Adopted

At the UN, the issue of Spain was one of the first to be addressed by the organization, on the initiative of the Polish delegation. On 29 April 1946, the Security Council adopted UNSC Resolution 4, in which it noted its "unanimous moral condemnation of the Franco regime", resolved to undertake further studies in order to determine whether the situation in Spain was causing international friction and endangering international peace and security and, to that end, appointed a subcommittee to further examine the matter and report on it. Between May and June 1946, the Security Council conducted its study of the political situation in Spain, in which it arrived at the following conclusions:

- Franco's regime was fascist in nature, established with the help of the Nazi regime in Germany and the fascist regime in Italy.
- Despite Allied protests, Franco aided the Axis Powers by sending the Blue Division to the Soviet Union and seizing Tangier in 1940.
- Franco was a guilty party, with Hitler and Mussolini, in the conspiracy to wage war against those countries that later banded together as the United Nations. It was part of the conspiracy that Franco's full belligerency should be postponed until a time to be mutually agreed upon.

Convinced that the Francoist State was imposed on the Spanish people by force with the help of the Axis powers (which it helped during the war) and did not represent the Spanish people, making it impossible to participate in international affairs of the Spanish people with The United Nations, on December 12, 1946, the General Assembly adopted Resolution 39, which excluded the Spanish government from international organizations and conferences established by the United Nations. In addition, the resolution recommended that the Security Council take the necessary measures if, within a "reasonable time", no new Government was established whose authority emanated from the consent of the governed. Likewise, the resolution recommended the immediate withdrawal of ambassadors accredited to the Government of Spain. The resolution was adopted with 34 votes in favour, 6 votes against, 13 abstentions and one absence.

The day after the adoption of the resolution, the Francoist State responded with a large demonstration in the Plaza de Oriente vindicating national pride in the face of foreign hostility and appealing to the Spanish people's self-sufficiency. These sanctions failed to weaken Francoist Spain, which in domestic politics reacted to a propaganda campaign that managed to strengthen Franco by stirring up the spectre of "foreign interference." Neither did internationally have great effects, beyond constituting a symbol of international ostracism of the Spanish State. Some countries (especially Argentina) did not abide by the recommendation to withdraw their ambassadors, while many others simply left their delegations in charge of chargés d'affaires. In addition, the Francoist State overcame the storm through the so-called substitution policies, bridging with Spanish-American republics and Arab countries in the hope that the Western countries, driven by the Cold War, rectify their attitude towards Spain.

=== Voting ===
For

Australia, Belgium, Bolivia, Brazil, Byelorussian SSR, Chile, China, Czechoslovakia, Denmark, Ethiopia, France, Guatemala, Haiti, Iceland, India, Iran, Liberia, Luxembourg, Mexico, New Zealand, Nicaragua, Norway, Panama, Paraguay, Philippines, Poland, Sweden, Ukrainian SSR, United Kingdom, United States, Uruguay, USSR, Venezuela, Yugoslavia.

Against

Argentina, Costa Rica, Dominican Republic, Ecuador, El Salvador, Peru.

Abstentions

Afghanistan, Canada, Colombia, Cuba, Egypt, Greece, Honduras, Lebanon, Netherlands, Saudi Arabia, South Africa, Syria, Turkey.

Absent

Iraq.

== Resolution 386 ==
UN General Assembly Resolution 386
- Date: November 4 1950
- Meeting no.: 304
- Code: A/RES/386 (V) (Document)
- Subject: Relations of states members and specialized agencies with Spain
- Voting summary: 38 voted for; 10 voted against; 12 abstained
- Result: Adopted

However, the Cold War caused the US government to change its attitude towards Francoist Spain since its geographical situation and anticommunist government would be a valuable asset to the so-called "free world" plans. Under those conditions, Spain was gaining sympathy among several member countries of the UN. In January 1950, the American newspaper The New York Times published a letter of the Secretary of State Dean Acheson that admitted that Resolution 39 had been a failure and said that the government was able to support a resolution that would end both issues. However, the Francoist State continued to be condemned on the grounds that the policy pursued had been erroneous but not in the moral condemnation of Franco's reign and so the United States excluded Spain from the Marshall Plan and did not invite it to join NATO.

On November 4, 1950, the General Assembly adopted Resolution 386, which revoked the recommendation for the withdrawal of ambassadors accredited to the Spanish government while repealing the recommendation that prevented Spain from being a member of the International agencies established or linked by the United Nations. The resolution was adopted with 38 votes in favour, 10 against, 12 abstentions and no absences.

=== Voting ===
For

Afghanistan, Argentina, Belgium, Bolivia, Brazil, Canada, Chile, China, Colombia, Costa Rica, Dominican Republic, Ecuador, Egypt, El Salvador, Greece, Haiti, Honduras, Iceland, Iran, Iraq, Lebanon, Liberia, Luxembourg, Netherlands, Nicaragua, Pakistan, Panama, Paraguay, Peru, Philippines, Saudi Arabia, South Africa, Syria, Thailand, Turkey, United States, Venezuela, Yemen.

Against

Byelorussian SSR, Czechoslovakia, Guatemala, Israel, Mexico, Poland, Ukrainian SSR, Uruguay, USSR, Yugoslavia.

Abstentions

Australia, Burma, Cuba, Denmark, Ethiopia, France, India, Indonesia, New Zealand, Norway, Sweden, United Kingdom.

Absent

None.

== Conclusion ==
Resolution 386 paved the way for Spain to join the United Nations system, a process that began in 1951 with its incorporation into agencies such as UPU, ITU, FAO and WHO and was completed with its accession to the UN on December 14, 1955.

== See also ==
- United Nations Security Council Resolution 4
- United Nations Security Council Resolution 7
- Dates of establishment of diplomatic relations with Francoist Spain
