= Spain and the United Nations =

Kingdom of Spain

United Nations membership
- Membership: Full member
- Since: 14 December 1955
- UNSC seat: Non-permanent
- Permanent Representative: Héctor Gómez Hernández

Spain–United Nations relations are the international relations between the United Nations (UN) and Spain.

== History ==
=== Precedents ===
The forerunner of the United Nations was the League of Nations, an organization that was established in 1919, after the signing of the Treaty of Versailles, "to promote international cooperation and achieve peace and security", and to which Spain adhered as a founding country included in Annex I of the Treaty of Versailles (1920). The outbreak of World War II revealed the failure of the League of Nations.

== Membership of the organization ==
In the aftermath of the Second World War, the newly formed United Nations was initially reluctant to admit Francoist Spain because:

- Franco's regime was fascist in nature, established with the help of the Nazi regime in Germany and the fascist regime in Italy.
- Despite Allied protests, Franco aided the Axis Powers by sending the Blue Division to the Soviet Union and seizing Tangier in 1940.
- Franco was a guilty party, with Hitler and Mussolini, in the conspiracy to wage war against those countries that later banded together as the United Nations. It was part of the conspiracy that Franco's full belligerency should be postponed until a time to be mutually agreed upon.

Thus, on 12 December 1946, the General Assembly adopted Resolution 39(I), which excluded the Spanish government from international organizations and conferences established by the United Nations. Resolution 39 further recommended that the Security Council take the necessary measures if, within a "reasonable time", no new government was established in Spain whose authority emanated from the consent of the governed and, in addition, recommended the immediate withdrawal of ambassadors accredited to the Government of Spain. The resolution was adopted with 34 votes in favour, 6 votes against, 13 abstentions and one absence.

The outbreak of the Cold War, however, caused the US government to change its attitude towards Francoist Spain since its geographical situation and anticommunist government was seen as a valuable asset to the plans of the "free world". At the same time, Spain was gaining sympathy among several member countries of the UN. In January 1950, The New York Times published a letter by the U.S. Secretary of State Dean Acheson that admitted that Resolution 39 had been a failure.

Accordingly, on 4 November 1950, the General Assembly adopted Resolution 386, which revoked the recommendation for the withdrawal of ambassadors accredited to the Spanish government and repealed the recommendation that prevented Spain from being a member of the international agencies established by or linked to the United Nations. The resolution was adopted with 38 votes in favour, 10 against, 12 abstentions and no absences.

Spain presented its application for membership on 23 September 1955 and joined the UN the following 14 December. (Note: See also: United Nations Security Council Resolution 109.) It has been an elected member of the Security Council on five occasions: approximately once every ten years, most recently in 2015–2016. Throughout this period, and especially since the return of democracy following Franco's death in November 1975, Spain has been actively involved in the organization, reiterating the need for the international community to be based on the pillars of security, development and respect for human rights.

== Economic contribution ==
Spain ranks eleventh on the scale of financial contributions to the United Nations Regular Budget and is a member of the Geneva Group, made up of the largest contributors, which carries out exhaustive monitoring of administrative and budgetary issues in the United Nations system, including the specialized agencies and international technical organizations.

== Organizations based in Spain ==
UN organizations with their headquarters in Spanish cities include the World Tourism Organization in Madrid, the United Nations Global Service Centre in Valencia and in the past the United Nations University – Institute for Globalization, Culture and Mobility in Barcelona.
