= Secretary of State for Foreign Affairs (Spain) =

- Secretario de Estado de Asuntos Exteriores
- Coat of Arms used by the Government

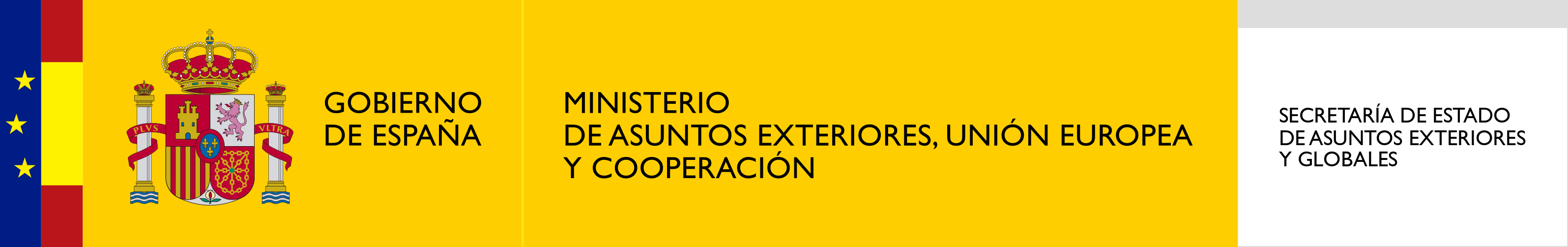

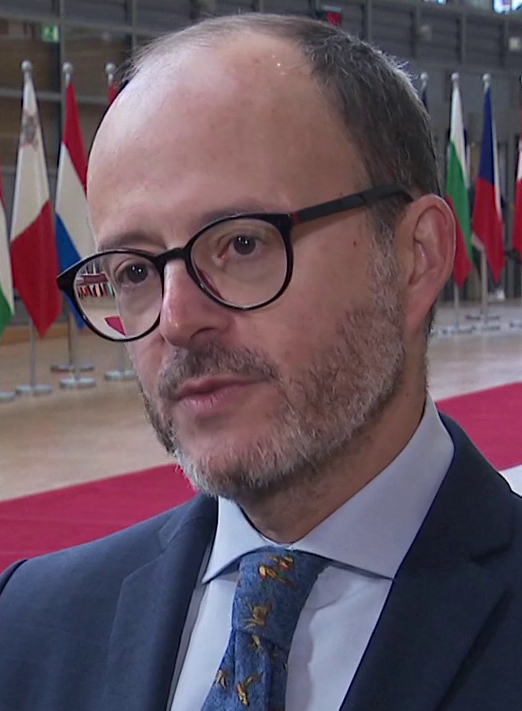
- Incumbent; Diego Martínez Belío since 20 December 2023
- Ministry of Foreign Affairs; Secretariat of State for Foreign Affairs
- Style: The Most Excellent (formal); Mr. Secretary of State (informal)
- Abbreviation: SEAEX
- Member of: National Security Council; Foreign Policy Executive Council
- Reports to: The Foreign Minister
- Nominator: The Foreign Minister
- Appointer: The Monarch
- Formation: 27 April 1979; 47 years ago
- First holder: Carlos Robles Piquer
- Website: exteriores.gob.es

The secretary of state for foreign and global affairs (SEAEX) is a senior minister of the Ministry of Foreign Affairs, European Union and Cooperation of the Government of Spain. Although he or she has the same rank as the other secretaries of state of the department, the SEAEX is considered the second-in-command to the minister.

The secretary of state for foreign affairs is responsible for assisting the minister in the planning of the foreign policy guidelines and its subsequent implementation. It is also responsible for the foreign policy regarding Eastern Europe, Africa, Asia—including the Middle East—and Oceanic countries.

Finally, it also coordinates the foreign policy with respect to international organizations—primarily the United Nations and others related to international security—except for those that fall under the jurisdiction of other secretaries of state. This also includes issues like terrorism, security, peacekeeping operations, non-proliferation and nuclear disarmament, and human rights.

== History ==
The Secretariat of State for Foreign Affairs was created in 1979 as a body of «general competence» destinated to help the Foreign Minister in his duties. This body was suppressed in 1982 and its competences were re-assumed by the Minister.

In 1985, the department was reactivated with the level of General Secretariat and was called General Secretariat for Foreign Policy and the Secretary General had the rank of Under Secretary. In 1996, with the change of government, the General Secretariat was subordinated to a new Secretariat of State called Secretariat of State for Foreign Policy and for the European Union, assuming the coordinations competences of the General Secretariat and the competences of the Secretariat of State for the European Union. This was reverted again in 2000 when the secretariat of state was split in two.

In 2004, the new government gave the competencies over Ibero-America to this Secretariat of State that before belonged to the Secretariat of State for International Cooperation but in 2008 this competences were assumed by a new Secretariat of State for Ibero-America and were re-assumed again in the very late 2010 under the name of Secretariat of State for Foreign and Ibero-American Affairs.

With the Rajoy government, the Secretariat of State established its current structure, with the exception of everything regarding Ibero-America and the Caribbean, which was established in 2020.

=== Names ===
- Secretary of State for Foreign Affairs (1979–1982).
- Competences assumed by the Minister between 1982 and 1985.
- General Secretariat for Foreign Policy (1985–1996).
- Secretary of State for Foreign Policy and for the European Union (1996–2000).
- Secretary of State for Foreign Affairs (2000–2004).
- Secretary of State for Foreign Affairs and Ibero-America (2004–2008).
- Secretary of State for Foreign Affairs (2008–2010).
- Secretary of State for Foreign and Ibero-American Affairs. (2010–2011).
- Secretary of State for Foreign Affairs (2011–2020)
- Secretary of State for Foreign Affairs and for Ibero-America and the Caribbean (2020–2021)
- Secretary of State for Foreign and Global Affairs (2021–present)

== Structure ==
The Secretariat of State is composed of six departments, all of them run by a director-general:

- The Directorate-General for Foreign Policy and Security.
  Described as the "Policy Director", it assists the secretary of state in the coordination of the other directorates-general and implements the secretary of state's instructions. It also coordinates Spanish participation at the Common Foreign and Security Policy of the European Union, the Organization for Security and Co-operation in Europe and in other international organizations focused on international security, terrorism, non-proliferation and disarmament.
- The Directorate-General for the United Nations, International Organizations and Human Rights.
  It's responsible for coordinating Spanish policy regarding the United Nations and all its bodies, as well as those focused on human rights, democracy and rule of law, environment and climate change. It also assists and promotes the participation of Spanish nationals as international civil servants in this organizations.
- The Directorate-General for the Maghreb, the Mediterranean and the Middle East.
  It's the department in charge of designing and implementing Spain's foreign policy regarding the Maghreb, the south Mediterranean countries and the Middle East, the promotion of bilateral relations with the countries it encompasses and the follow-up of the initiatives and multilateral forums of the geographic area of its competence.
- The Directorate-General for Africa.
  It's the department in charge of the rest of the African continent, specifically Sub-Saharan Africa, promoting bilateral relations with the countries it encompasses and the follow-up of the initiatives and multilateral forums of the geographic area of its competence.
- The Directorate-General for North America, Eastern Europe, Asia and Pacific.
  It's the department in charge of the proposal and execution of the foreign policy of Spain in its corresponding geographical area, the promotion of bilateral relations with the countries it encompasses, the follow-up of the initiatives and multilateral forums of the geographic area of its competence and the impulse to the Foundations Council Spain-United States, Spain-China, Spain-Japan, Spain-India and Spain-Australia.

== List of secretaries of state ==
No.	Image	Name	Term of Office			Minister(s) serving under	Prime Minister
No.	Image	Name	Began	Ended	Duration	Minister(s) serving under	Prime Minister
1º		Carlos Robles Piquer	27 April 1979	24 October 1981	2 years, 180 days	Marcelino Oreja Aguirre José Pedro Pérez-Llorca	Adolfo Suárez Leopoldo Calvo-Sotelo
2º		Gabriel Mañueco de Lecea	6 November 1981	21 October 1982	349 days	José Pedro Pérez-Llorca	Leopoldo Calvo-Sotelo
3º		Ramón de Miguel y Egea	14 May 1996	6 May 2000	3 years, 358 days	Abel Matutes	José María Aznar
4º		Miquel Nadal Segalá	6 May 2000	20 July 2002	2 years, 75 days	Josep Piqué	José María Aznar
5º		Ramón Gil-Casares	20 July 2002	20 April 2004	1 year, 275 days	Ana Palacio	José María Aznar
6º		Bernardino León	20 April 2004	22 April 2008	4 years, 2 days	Miguel Ángel Moratinos	José Luis Rodríguez Zapatero
7º		Ángel Lossada Torres-Quevedo	22 April 2008	27 July 2010	2 years, 96 days	Miguel Ángel Moratinos	José Luis Rodríguez Zapatero
8º		Juan Pablo de Laiglesia y González de Peredo	27 July 2010	6 November 2010	102 days	Trinidad Jiménez	José Luis Rodríguez Zapatero
9º		Juan Antonio Yáñez-Barnuevo García	6 November 2010	24 December 2011	1 year, 48 days	Trinidad Jiménez	José Luis Rodríguez Zapatero
10º		Gonzalo de Benito Secades	24 December 2011	15 November 2014	2 years, 326 days	José Manuel García-Margallo	Mariano Rajoy
11º		Ignacio Ybáñez Rubio	15 November 2014	21 January 2017	2 years, 67 days	José Manuel García-Margallo	Mariano Rajoy
12º		Ildefonso Castro López	21 January 2017	19 June 2018	1 year, 149 days	Alfonso Dastis	Mariano Rajoy
13º		Fernando Martín Valenzuela Marzo	19 June 2018	5 February 2020	1 year, 231 days	Josep Borrell	Pedro Sánchez
14º		Cristina Gallach	5 February 2020	21 July 2021	1 year, 166 days	Arancha González Laya	Pedro Sánchez
15º		Ángeles Moreno Bau	21 July 2021	20 December 2023	2 years, 152 days	José Manuel Albares	Pedro Sánchez
16º		Diego Martínez Belío	20 December 2023	Incumbent	2 years, 261 days	José Manuel Albares	Pedro Sánchez

== See also ==
- Permanent Representative of Spain to the United Nations
- Permanent Representative of Spain to the United Nations in Geneva
- Permanent Representative of Spain to the United Nations in Vienna
