= Spanish Australians =

Spanish Australians Hispano-australianos

Total population
- 128,693 (by ancestry, 2021) (0.5% of the Australian population); 17,281 (by birth, 2021)

Regions with significant populations
- Primarily capital cities

Languages
- Australian English, Spanish. Minority speaks Catalan, Galician, and Basque.

Religion
- Roman Catholicism (majority); Protestantism (minority)

Related ethnic groups
- Spaniards, Castilians, Asturians, Cantabrians, Aragonese, Galicians, Catalans, Basques, other Hispanic and Latin American Australians

People with Spanish ancestry as a percentage of the population in Sydney divided geographically by postal area, as of the 2011 census

Spanish Australians refers to Australian citizens and residents of Spanish descent, or people who were born in Spain and immigrated to Australia. There are approximately 123,000 Australians who are of full or partial Spanish descent, most of whom reside within the major cities of Sydney and Melbourne, with lesser numbers in Brisbane, Perth and Adelaide. Of these, according to the 2011 Australian census, 13,057 were born in Spain.

== History ==
=== In Victoria ===
Although Spanish seafarers began exploring the South Pacific in the sixteenth century, it was not until the Victorian gold rush of the 1850s that Spanish immigrants began to arrive in Victoria. The first Spanish restaurant was opened in Melbourne in 1860. By 1871, 135 Spaniards lived in Victoria, 80% of them men. Over the next two decades, the number of Spanish women arriving in Victoria tripled; a few more men also arrived.

Despite a military coup in Spain in 1923 and the Spanish Civil War of 1936–1939, few Spanish refugees settled in Victoria. Immigration Acts passed in the 1920s restricted the entry of Spaniards and other southern Europeans. By 1947, the Spain-born population of Victoria was only 252.

The Spain-born population dramatically increased from the late 1950s, following the 1958 Spanish-Australian migration agreement. The agreement provided assisted passages to Spanish migrants, many escaping poverty and hunger. The community in Victoria increased from 374 in 1954 to 3,143 in 1966.

During the following decades economic improvements in Spain coincided with a slowing of Spanish immigration to Australia. The Spain-born community in Victoria today has declined from 4,067 in 1986 to 3,523, in 2016.

The Spain-born community in Victoria is also aging: 45% of its population are between the ages of 50 and 75. Living predominantly in the Geelong area, the majority are employed as professionals and tradespeople.

The community is supported by a number of groups and organizations including the Spanish Welfare Centre (CELAS), providing counseling, community development and educational programs. Spanish culture in Victoria is further maintained through SBS and community radio and television programs, and publications such as The Spanish Herald.

== Notable people ==
- Carlos José Blanco Smith, rugby union player
- Josh Cordoba, rugby league player
- Alex de Minaur, tennis player (Spanish mother)
- Al Grassby, politician
- Juan Manuel Fuentes
- Elsa Pataky, actress
- Ellen Perez, tennis player
- Nathalia Ramos, actress
- Rosendo Salvado, abbot of New Norcia
- Holly Valance, a singer (some Spanish ancestry on mother's side)
- Isaías Sánchez, football (soccer) player and captain of Adelaide United in the A-League from 2017 to 2019
- Miguel Maestre, restaurateur and television presenter - co-host lifestyle television series The Living Room.
- Alyssa Alano, actress and model (Spanish biological father)
- Jacob Elordi, actor (Basque descent)

== See also ==
- Australia–Spain relations
- Catholic Church in Australia
- European Australians
- Europeans in Oceania
- Hispanic and Latin American Australians
- Immigration to Australia
- Spanish New Zealanders
