= List of ambassadors of Spain to Australia =

Ambassador of Spain to Australia
- Coat of arms of Spain
- Incumbent; Esther Monterrubio Villar since 31 July 2024
- Ministry of Foreign Affairs; Secretariat of State for Foreign Affairs
- Style: The Most Excellent
- Residence: Canberra
- Nominator: The Foreign Minister
- Appointer: The Monarch
- Term length: At the government's pleasure
- Inaugural holder: Juan Ramón Parellada Soteras
- Formation: 1968
- Website: Mission of Spain to Australia

The ambassador of Spain to Australia is the official representative of the Kingdom of Spain to the Commonwealth of Australia. It is also accredited to the Republic of Nauru, the Independent State of Papua New Guinea, the Solomon Islands, Tuvalu and the Republic of Vanuatu.

Australia and Spain established diplomatic relations on 26 October 1967 and, the following year, Spain established an embassy in Canberra.

== Jurisdiction ==
- Australia: The ambassador manages Australia–Spain relations and the embassy's consular section provides services to the Australian Capital Territory and Queanbeyan. For the rest of the country, Spain has consulates-general in Sydney and Melbourne. It has also honorary consulates in Adelaide, Ayr, Brisbane, Darwin and Perth.

Also, the ambassador to Australia is accredited to:

- Nauru: Nauru and Spain has diplomatic relations since 27 September 1995. The Consulate-General of Spain in Sydney is responsible for consular assistance.
- Papua New Guinea: Since 28 August 1978, Spain and Papua New Guinea has maintained diplomatic relations and Spain has an honorary consulate in Gordon.
- Solomon Islands: Spain established diplomatic relations with the Solomon Islands on 8 August 1980. Consular affairs are managed by the Consulate-General of Spain in Sydney.
- Tuvalu: Diplomatic relations were established in 1992. Consular issues are responsibility of the Consulate-General of Spain in Sydney.
- Vanuatu: Spain has maintained diplomatic relations with Vanuatu since 30 April 1981. Spain has an honorary consulate in the island.

In the past, the Spanish ambassador to Australia was also responsible for diplomatic and consular relations with the Cook Islands (1999–2005), Fiji (1977–2005), New Zealand (1969–2006), Samoa (1992–2005) and Tonga (1981–2005). Following the establishment of a resident embassy in Wellington in 2006, all these States came under its jurisdiction.

== List of ambassadors ==
Ambassador		Term	Nominated by	Appointed by	Accredited to
1	Juan Ramón Parellada Soteras (Note: Accredited to New Zealand.)	20 January 1969 – 3 January 1974 (4 years, 348 days)	Fernando María Castiella	Francisco Franco	The Lord Casey
2	Alberto Pascual Villar (Note: Accredited to Fiji and New Zealand.)	3 January 1974 – 5 May 1977 (3 years, 122 days)	Laureano López Rodó	Francisco Franco	Paul Hasluck
3	Carlos Manuel Fernández-Shaw Baldasano (Note: Accredited to Fiji, New Zealand, Papua New Guinea, Solomon Islands and Tonga.)	15 July 1977 – 9 April 1983 (5 years, 268 days)	The Marquess of Oreja	Juan Carlos I	John Kerr
4	Francisco Utray Sardá	9 April 1983 – 13 February 1987 (3 years, 310 days)	Fernando Morán	Juan Carlos I	Ninian Stephen
5	José Luis Pardos	19 February 1987 – 18 February 1992 (4 years, 364 days)	Francisco Fernández Ordóñez	Juan Carlos I	Ninian Stephen
6	Antonio Núñez García-Saúco (Note: Accredited to Fiji, New Zealand, Papua New Guinea, Samoa, Solomon Islands, Tonga and Vanuatu.)	28 April 1992 – 30 May 1996 (4 years, 32 days)	Francisco Fernández Ordóñez	Juan Carlos I	Bill Hayden
7	Emilio Fernández-Castaño y Díaz-Caneja (Note: Accredited to Cook Islands, Fiji, Nauru, New Zealand, Papua New Guinea, Samoa, Solomon Islands, Tonga and Vanuatu.)	21 September 1996 – 13 January 2001 (4 years, 114 days)	Abel Matutes	Juan Carlos I	William Deane
8	José Ramón Barañano Fernández (Note: Accredited to Cook Islands, Fiji, Nauru, New Zealand, Papua New Guinea, Samoa, Solomon Islands, Tonga, Tuvalu and Vanuatu.)	21 April 2001 – 1 August 2005 (4 years, 102 days)	Josep Piqué	Juan Carlos I	William Deane
9	Antonio Cosano Pérez (Note: Accredited to Papua New Guinea, Solomon Islands and Vanuatu.)	1 August 2005 – 5 June 2008 (2 years, 309 days)	Miguel Ángel Moratinos	Juan Carlos I	Michael Jeffery
10	Carlos Sánchez de Boado (Note: Accredited to Nauru, Papua New Guinea, Solomon Islands and Vanuatu.)	12 July 2008 – 30 July 2011 (3 years, 18 days)	Miguel Ángel Moratinos	Juan Carlos I	Michael Jeffery
11	Enrique Viguera Rubio (Note: Accredited to Nauru, Papua New Guinea, Solomon Islands, Tuvalu and Vanuatu.)	30 July 2011 – 13 June 2015 (3 years, 318 days)	Trinidad Jiménez	Juan Carlos I	Quentin Bryce
12	Manuel Cacho Quesada	13 June 2015 – 16 September 2020 (5 years, 95 days)	José Manuel García-Margallo	Felipe VI	Peter Cosgrove
13	Alicia Moral Revilla (Note: Accredited to Nauru, Papua New Guinea, Tuvalu and Vanuatu.)	16 September 2020 – 31 July 2024 (3 years, 319 days)	Arancha González Laya	Felipe VI	David Hurley
14	Esther Monterrubio Villar	31 July 2024 – present (2 years, 88 days)	José Manuel Albares	Felipe VI	Sam Mostyn

== See also ==
- Australia–Spain relations
- Foreign relations of Spain
- List of ambassadors of Australia to Spain
