= List of ambassadors of Spain to New Zealand =

Ambassador of Spain to New Zealand
- Coat of arms of Spain

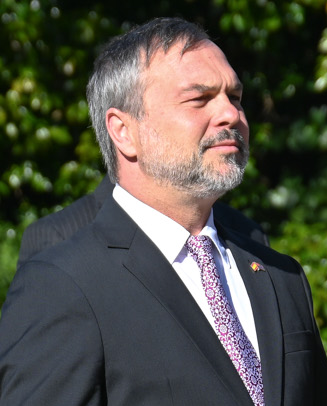
- Incumbent; Luis Alfonso Sánchez-Vellisco Sánchez since 16 July 2025
- Ministry of Foreign Affairs; Secretariat of State for Foreign Affairs
- Style: The Most Excellent
- Residence: Wellington
- Nominator: The Foreign Minister
- Appointer: The Monarch
- Term length: At the government's pleasure
- Inaugural holder: Juan Ramón Parellada Soteras
- Formation: 1969
- Website: Mission of Spain to New Zealand

The ambassador of Spain to New Zealand is the official representative of the Kingdom of Spain to the New Zealand. It is also accredited to the Cook Islands, the Republic of Fiji, the Republic of Kiribati, the Independent State of Samoa and the Kingdom of Tonga.

New Zealand and Spain established diplomatic relations on 28 March 1969, and the following month Spain established a non-resident embassy, based in Canberra. Following the establishment of a resident ambassador in Madrid in 1992, Spain created a resident embassy in Wellington in 2006, assuming part of the jurisdiction of the Embassy in Canberra over the surrounding island-states.

== Jurisdiction ==
- New Zealand: The ambassador manages New Zealand–Spain relations and the Embassy's Consular Section provides services to the entire country. It has honorary consulates in Auckland, Christchurch and Hastings.

Also, the ambassador to New Zealand is accredited to:

- Cook Islands: Cook Islands and Spain has diplomatic relations since 29 January 1998. It has an honorary consulate in Rarotonga.
- Fiji: Since 1977, Fiji and Spain has maintained diplomatic relations. Consular affairs are managed through the Wellington Embassy's Consular Section.
- Kiribati: Spain established diplomatic relations with the Solomon Islands in 2011. Consular affairs are managed through the Embassy's Consular Section.
- Samoa: Diplomatic relations were established in 1980. Spain has an honorary consulate in Apia.
- Tonga: Spain has maintained diplomatic relations with Vanuatu since 16 November 1979. Spain has an honorary consulate in Nukuʻalofa.

== List of ambassadors ==
Ambassador		Term	Nominated by	Appointed by	Accredited to
1	Juan Ramón Parellada Soteras (Note: Resident in Canberra.)	13 September 1969 – 3 January 1974 (4 years, 112 days)	Fernando María Castiella	Francisco Franco	The Lord Porritt
2	Alberto Pascual Villar	18 March 1974 – 5 May 1977 (3 years, 48 days)	Pedro Cortina Mauri	Francisco Franco	Denis Blundell
3	Carlos Manuel Fernández-Shaw Baldasano	23 February 1978 – 18 April 1983 (5 years, 54 days)	The Marquess of Oreja	Juan Carlos I	Keith Holyoake
4	Francisco Utray Sardá	16 September 1983 – 13 February 1987 (3 years, 150 days)	Fernando Morán	Juan Carlos I	David Beattie
5	José Luis Pardos	2 June 1987 – 18 February 1992 (4 years, 261 days)	Francisco Fernández Ordóñez	Juan Carlos I	Paul Reeves
6	Antonio Núñez García-Saúco	28 April 1992 – 30 May 1996 (4 years, 32 days)	Francisco Fernández Ordóñez	Juan Carlos I	Catherine Tizard
7	Emilio Fernández-Castaño y Díaz-Caneja	29 January 1997 – 13 January 2001 (3 years, 350 days)	Abel Matutes	Juan Carlos I	Michael Hardie Boys
8	José Ramón Barañano Fernández	4 August 2001 – 1 August 2005 (3 years, 362 days)	Josep Piqué	Juan Carlos I	Silvia Cartwright
9	Camilo Barcia García-Villamil	22 April 2006 – 30 October 2007 (1 year, 191 days)	Miguel Ángel Moratinos	Juan Carlos I	Silvia Cartwright
10	Marcos Gómez Martínez (Note: Accredited to the Cook Islands, Fiji, Samoa and Tonga.)	29 December 2007 – 30 April 2011 (3 years, 122 days)	Miguel Ángel Moratinos	Juan Carlos I	Anand Satyanand
11	Jesús Miguel Sanz Escorihuela (Note: Accredited to the Cook Islands, Fiji, Kiribati, Samoa and Tonga.)	30 April 2011 – 31 August 2013 (2 years, 123 days)	Trinidad Jiménez	Juan Carlos I	Anand Satyanand
12	Manuel Viturro de la Torre	9 November 2013 – 5 September 2015 (1 year, 301 days)	José Manuel García-Margallo	Juan Carlos I	Jerry Mateparae
13	Manuel Pradas Romaní	5 September 2015 – 13 January 2018 (2 years, 130 days)	José Manuel García-Margallo	Felipe VI	Jerry Mateparae
14	Fernando Curcio Ruigómez	7 April 2018 – 27 July 2022 (4 years, 111 days)	Alfonso Dastis	Felipe VI	Patsy Reddy
15	Miguel Bauzá y More	27 July 2022 – 11 June 2025 (2 years, 319 days)	José Manuel Albares	Felipe VI	Cindy Kiro
16	Luis Alfonso Sánchez-Vellisco	16 July 2025 – present (1 year, 53 days)	José Manuel Albares	Felipe VI	Cindy Kiro

== See also ==
- New Zealand–Spain relations
