= Spanish New Zealanders =

Spanish New Zealanders Hispano-neozelandeses
Total population
- 2,043 (2013)

Regions with significant populations
- Auckland

Languages
- New Zealand English, Spanish. Minority speaks Catalan, Galician, and Basque.

Religion
- Roman Catholicism

Related ethnic groups
- Spaniards, Spanish Australians

Spanish New Zealanders refers to New Zealand citizens and residents of Spanish descent, or people who were born in Spain and emigrated to New Zealand. As of 2013, there were approximately 2,043 New Zealanders who were of full or partial Spanish descent, most of whom reside within the major cities of Auckland and Wellington.

Immigration to New Zealand from Spain was minimal during the 1850s and 1860s resulting from the social disruption of the Carlist civil wars. Larger numbers of Spanish immigrants entered the country in the first quarter of the twentieth century due to the same circumstances of rural poverty and urban congestion that led other Europeans to emigrate in that period, as well as unpopular wars. Many immigrants either moved back to Spain or to another country. Spaniards married Latin Americans aside from European New Zealanders and Māori because of cultural proximity, and in 20th century, Spaniards and Latin Americans joined forces for cultural activities and to promote the teaching of Spanish in New Zealand.

== See also ==
- European New Zealanders
- Europeans in Oceania
- Immigration to New Zealand
- New Zealand–Spain relations
- Pākehā
- Spanish Australians
- Spanish immigration to Hawaii
