= Robert Swan =

British adventurer

Robert Charles Swan, OBE, FRGS (born 28 July 1956) is the first person to walk to both poles.

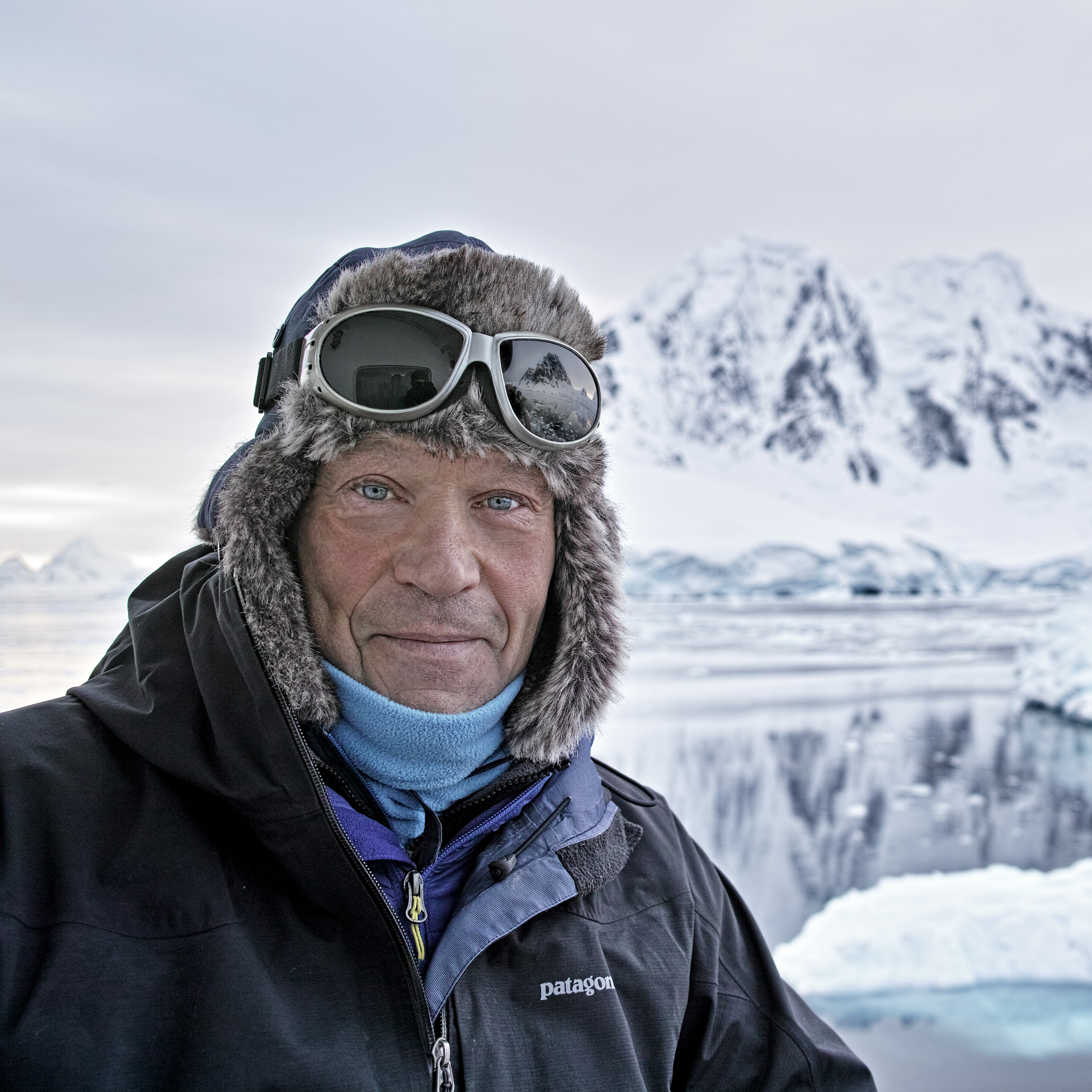
Robert Swan

He is currently an advocate for the protection of Antarctica and renewable energy. Swan is also the founder of 2041, a company which is dedicated to the preservation of the Antarctic and the author with Gil Reavill of Antarctica 2041: My Quest to Save the Earth's Last Wilderness.

In November 2017, Swan undertook the South Pole Energy Challenge, the first expedition of its kind: a 600-mile journey to the South Pole with his son, surviving solely using renewable energy.

== Early life and education ==
He was born in Durham, England, and attended Aysgarth School and then Sedbergh School (1969–1974) before completing a BA in ancient history (1976–1979) at St Chad's College, Durham University.

== South Pole: "In the Footsteps of Scott" (1984–1987) ==
Southern Quest set sail on 3 November 1984 to travel the 14,842 nautical miles (27,487 km) to Antarctica. The expedition stopped over in Lyttelton, New Zealand, to meet Bill Burton, who at 96 years old was the last surviving member of Scott's expedition in 1912. Swan's initial Antarctic expedition was thus officially dubbed "In the Footsteps of Scott". Upon arrival on the frozen continent, Swan and his team spent the Antarctic winter at the Jack Hayward Base with colleagues John Tolson and Michael Stroud. When the winter had passed, Swan, Roger Mear and Gareth Wood set out to walk 900 miles (1,400 km) to the South Pole. They arrived at the South Pole on 11 January 1986, after 70 days without the aid of any radio communications or back-up support and having hauled 350 lb (160 kg) sledges. Swan's team had achieved the longest unassisted march ever made in history. Once at the pole, they received the bad news that their ship, Southern Quest, had been crushed by pack ice and had sunk, just minutes before they arrived. While welcomed by the scientists at the Pole, There was much criticism of the adventure from the US military authorities in charge of Antarctica stations, who claimed they needed to rescue and fly some of the party back out to New Zealand. However, Swan returned in 1987 with a ship to collect the rest of the team at Jack Hayward Base and to remove all traces of his expedition, i.e., rubbish and remaining stores.

== North Pole: "Icewalk" (1987–1989) ==
Three years after reaching the South Pole, Swan assembled a team of eight people from seven nations for an attempt at the North Pole. The Icewalk expedition team consisted of: Misha Malakhov from Russia, Rupert Summerson of the UK, Graeme Joy of Australia, Arved Fuchs of Germany, Hiroshi Onishi from Japan, Angus Cockney of the Inuit, and Daryl E. Roberts of the US. Icewalk's base camp held 22 representatives from 15 nations, with the US represented by Mike Doyle and photojournalist Michael Forster Rothbart. They produced a series of educational films there and facilitated the removal of rubbish from the surrounding Arctic wilderness. Swan and his team reached the North Pole on 14 May 1989. The team nearly drowned during their expedition due to the unseasonable melting of Arctic ice. Their journey made Swan the first man to walk to both the North and South poles, unassisted.

== Cleaning up 1500 tons of waste from Antarctica ==
In 1992, Swan was invited by the United Nations to be a keynote speaker to the first Earth Summit for sustainable development, in Rio de Janeiro, Brazil. In response to the world leaders' challenge to "think global act local", Swan made a commitment to deliver a global and local environmental mission involving industry, business, and young people to the next World Summit in 2002.

In 1996–97, he organised a team for One Step Beyond, the South Pole Challenge. The mission was to remove and recycle 1,500 tons of waste that had been left at Bellingshausen station in Antarctica after decades of scientific research. The team worked for eight years to raise the money, plan, and execute the mission. The rubbish at the Russian base of Bellingshausen, King George Island, was cleared and the native penguins reclaimed their beach for the first time in 47 years.

== The 2041 Yacht: from Earth Summit to World Summit to Rio ==
Swan's 67' foot racing yacht 2041 was named after the year in which the 'Madrid Protocol' comes up for debate. The protocol, signed by nearly every nation, provides additional protection for the Antarctic Treaty and designates the continent as "a Natural Reserve Land for Science and Peace". It also places a ban on mining and mineral exploration in Antarctica for 50 years (1991–2041).

=== Overland to the Johannesburg World Summit ===
In 2002, Swan and his 2041 sailboat embarked on the longest overland voyage in history, visiting over 30 destinations in South Africa. Beginning in Cape Town, the voyage's destination was the 2002 World Summit for Sustainable Development in Johannesburg, South Africa. Swan partnered with loveLife – a charity battling AIDS in South Africa.

The voyage reached out to over 750,000 young people across South Africa. During the World Summit, the 'Ice Station' exhibit was visited by 128 world leaders and 35,000 visitors, including 12,000 young people. It was awarded first prize for outstanding contribution to the World Summit.

Swan was charged by the world leaders to continue his mission and report back at the next World Summit for Sustainable Development, ten years later, in 2012.

=== The Cape to Rio Yacht Race, January–April 2003 ===
As the first step to the 2012 World Summit at Rio, Swan brought a team of young African leaders on 2041 for the Cape to Rio Yacht Race.

=== Circumnavigation of Africa, May 2003 – May 2004 ===
Returning from the Rio, the yacht embarked on "The Circumnavigation of Africa". The voyage promoted AIDS awareness, water saving, and recycling whilst visiting over 30 ports.

Along the route, communities came out in force to participate in clean-up projects with the aim of improving their immediate environment. Three young men from loveLife were chosen by Swan to become the first African crew in history to circumnavigate their own continent.

=== The Sydney Hobart Yacht Race, December 2004 – January 2005 ===
Continuing on her journey towards the 2012 World Summit, Swan entered sailboat 2041 in the 2004/2005 Sydney Hobart Yacht Race with the world's first sails made entirely from recycled plastic (PET) bottles. 2041 was crewed by industry leaders and teachers selected for their outstanding inspiration for young people. The sailboat finished 24th in the race.

== The E-base and the Voyage for Cleaner Energy, 2008–2012 ==
=== "The E-base Goes Live", March 2008 ===
Powered entirely on renewable energy, Swan and a small team lived and sent broadcasts from the E-base via the internet for two weeks. It was the first time in history that a team had attempted to survive in Antarctica relying solely on renewable energy. Their mission was successful, and the team departed the continent after the allotted two weeks in good health.

=== The Voyage for Cleaner Energy, April 2008–2012 ===
On 8 April 2008, the Voyage for Cleaner Energy and 2041 sailboat launched from San Francisco, California. 2041 was refitted to operate entirely on wind, solar, and biodiesel generated energy. 2041 and Swan engaged in a multi-city tour of the West Coast of the US to highlight renewable energy and engage the youth of the world to take positive steps toward renewable, sustainable energy practices. 8 April 2008 was officially deemed "Robert Swan Day" in San Francisco at the request of Mayor Gavin Newsom.

== '2041' and Team Inspire International Antarctic Expeditions (2003–present) ==
=== International Antarctic Expeditions, 2003–2022 ===
Swan led the first corporate expedition to Antarctica in 2003. The expedition members witnessed firsthand the effects of climate change in Antarctica. They were tasked by Swan to become leaders in sustainability upon their return home. The expeditions include leadership development, climate change training, sustainability education, and training on Antarctica. In addition the expeditions teach participants the benefits and need to ensure the Protocol on Environmental Protection to the Antarctic Treaty remains as it is - a protocol that puts aside Antarctica for peaceful purposes and scientific research. It could potentially be modified or amended between the years 2041 and 2048.

The expeditions continue on a near-annual basis, with the most recent held in March 2022.

On the 2018 International Antarctic Expedition Team Zayed (Mariam Al Qassimi, Rashed Al Zaabi and Winston Cowie) representing the Environment Agency - Abu Dhabi and Jane Goodall lit up the Antarctic sky with a solar light show, writing a message in solar lights to the world on climate change and plastic. The solar light show, with Swan and his son Barney present, inspired the award-winning documentary Zayed's Antarctic Lights.

The 2022 International Antarctic Expedition was the largest yet and a collaboration between Swan's NGO '2041' and Swan's son Barney's NGO 'Climateforce'. The expedition left from Ushuaia, South America, on board the vessel the 'Ocean Victory', with 177 participants from 37 countries in attendance. Winston Cowie was the Program Director of the 2022 International Antarctic Expedition.

== Climate Force Challenge (2017 to 2025) ==
The goal of the Climate Force (CF) challenge is to reduce 360 million tonnes of CO_{2} before the year 2025. Working directly with businesses, communities, and students to promote sustainable development, Swan and his son Barney continue to manage expeditions as a platform to accelerate impact.

- South Pole Energy Challenge: 12 November 2017 – 15 January 2018
- IAE Antarctica '18: 27 February – 12 March 2018
- Mt. Kilimanjaro '19: 28 February – 10 March 2019
- Arctic '19: 15 – 25 June 2019
- Last Degree: 1 – 15 January 2020
- Undaunted: 24 December - 10 January 2023

== South Pole Energy Challenge, and Last 300 Expeditions ==
In November 2017, Swan undertook another expedition to the South Pole with his son Barney, on a mission known as the South Pole Energy Challenge (SPEC). This father and son team set out to ski a 600-mile journey surviving solely on renewable energy, a first in polar-exploration. Carrying everything on their sledges, they used NASA designed solar ice melters, biofuels made from waste, lithium batteries, and passive solar flasks for survival. Additionally, they planted 2,000 trees to make the logistics and operations of the expedition carbon positive. Swan planned to undertake a mission to complete his 35-year-old goal of crossing the entire Antarctic continent in January, 2022.

== Awards, honors and publications ==
- 1987 In the Footsteps of Scott published by Jonathan Cape, authored by Swan and Roger Mear
- 1988 Swan was awarded the Polar Medal by Her Majesty Queen Elizabeth II
- 1988 Destination: Antarctica published by Scholastic, Inc.
- 1989 Official Flag Bearer for the Explorers Club of New York to the North Pole (USA)
- 1989 Appointed United Nations Environment Program Goodwill Ambassador (UNEP)
- 1990 Winner of the United Nations Global 500 award
- 1990 Icewalk published by Icewalk Features
- 1992 Appointed United Nations Education/Science and Cultural Organization Goodwill Ambassador with Special Responsibility for Youth (UNESCO)
- 1992 Visiting Professor of the School of Environment, Leeds Metropolitan University (UK)
- 1993 Founded the Robert Swan Foundation – a registered charity for the promotion of youth and scientific endeavours in the environment
- 1993 Doctorate of Letters, The Robert Gordon University (UK)
- 1994 Appointed Special Envoy to the Director General of UNESCO
- 1995 Awarded OBE by Her Majesty Queen Elizabeth II
- 1998 Smithsonian Award for the Information technology in Education & Academia (USA)
- 2000 Honorary Member of the Amstel Club, the Netherlands
- 2000 2041: The Voyage South published by Hayloft Publishing
- 2002 Vice-President of the Countryside Management Association (UK)
- 2005 Awarded 'Freedom of the City of London'
- 2005 Elected, by membership vote, Honorary President of the 'Ski Club of Great Britain'
- 2006 Honorary Fellow at St. Chad's College, Durham University (UK)
- 2008 torchbearer of the 2008 Summer Olympics torch relay in St Petersburg, Russia
- 2014 TED Talk: Let's save the last pristine continent for TEDGlobal 2014 in Rio de Janeiro, Brazil
- 2015 Winner of the Humanitarian Innovation Lifetime Achievement Award
- 2017 Winner of UN NOVUS Award for contributing to 17 Sustainable Development Goals (SDG)
- 2017 Elected (one of thirty members) to the Helena Group

== See also ==
- Third man factor
