= Alyssa Alano =

Filipino film and television actress (born 1987)

- Born: Geramie Daud; 11 August 1987 (age 39); Zamboanga City, Philippines
- Occupations: Host, actress
- Years active: 2004–2014
- Agent: GMA Artist Center (2004–2014)

Alyssa Alano (born Geramie Daud; 11 August 1987) is a Filipino film and TV actress. She was a former member of the popular Viva Hot Babes franchise.

== Biography ==
Although she grew up in Tarlac, she was born Geramie Daud in Zamboanga City on 11 August 1987, to a Filipino mother. She claims her father is an Australian national of Spanish descent (who supposedly abandoned her and her mother).

== Notable appearances ==
=== "Keys Me" ===
During an appearance on GMA Network's late-night show Master Showman Presents in June 2006, Alano performed a cover of the song "Kiss Me" by Sixpence None the Richer. The performance became an Internet meme after a YouTube user, "calimanok", uploaded a mondegreened version of the performance with subtitles, with karaoke subtitles of her accented lyrics, which among other things, rendered the title of the song as "Keys Me."

Alano did not know that her YouTube video had become an Internet meme until it was shown to her during an interview on 24 Oras' "Chika Minute" segment. After discovering the video, she reacted positively, and credited the video for her growing popularity.

=== Una Kang Naging Akin ===
In 2008, Alano played the role of Maan in the afternoon drama Una Kang Naging Akin top-billed by Angelika dela Cruz and Maxene Magalona.

=== Ang Babaeng Hinugot sa Aking Tadyang ===
In 2009, she joined the cast of the adaptation of Carlo J. Caparas's thriller Ang Babaeng Hinugot sa Aking Tadyang as Yaya Citas.

=== Darna ===
In 2009, Alano was selected to play Marissa (the Flora Venom), one of Darna's enemies. As the story continues she gets her power with Lucefera (Ang Babaeng Tuod) who is portrayed by Francine Prieto. Flora Venom has an ability to kill people by shooting venom out of her mouth.

=== Full House ===
Alano is currently doing a new project on the GMA Network, a remake of the Korean hit comedy romance Full House, starring Heart Evangelista and Isabel Oli.

== Filmography ==
=== Television ===
Year	Title	Role
2004	Lagot Ka, Isusumbong Kita	Shirley
2006	Love to Love	Guest appearance
2006	Bahay Mo Ba 'To	Guest appearance
2006	Pinoy Meets World	Herself
2007	Lupin	Mary
2007	Kamandag	Queen Baba
2008–2013	Startalk	Herself / co-host
2008	Sine Novela: Una Kang Naging Akin	Maan
2009	Ang Babaeng Hinugot sa Aking Tadyang	Yaya Citas
2009	Wow Mali	Herself / guest appearance
2009	Rosalinda	Herself / guest appearance
2009	Darna	Melissa / Flora Venom
2009	Full House	Cristina
2010	Kaya ng Powers	Eva Eugenia
2011	Futbolilits	Gegay
2011	Spooky Nights Presents: Bahay ni Lolo: A Very Spooky Night	Herself
2011	Survivor Philippines: Celebrity Doubles Showdown	Herself / Castaway
2014	Confessions of a Torpe	Shirley

=== Film ===
Year	Title	Role
2006	Enteng Kabisote 3: Okay Ka, Fairy Ko: The Legend Goes On and On and On	Lukasta (from the raise of Luka)
2007	Kiss Meeh, Mananaggal Me	Lisa

== Awards and nominations ==
Year	Film award/critic	Award	Result
2008	FHM Philippines	100 Sexiest Women	Ranked # 88
2009	FHM Philippines	100 Sexiest Women	Ranked # 88
2011	FHM Philippines	100 Sexiest Women	Ranked # 76
