= The Spanish Helmet =

2011 novel by Greg Scowen

- Cover of first edition 2011
- Author: Greg Scowen
- Cover artist: Greg Scowen
- Language: English
- Genre: Conspiracy thriller, Historical fiction
- Publisher: Whare Rama Books
- Publication date: May 2011
- Publication place: US
- Media type: Print (Paperback) and E-book
- Pages: 364 pp
- ISBN: 978-1-4635-5848-2

The Spanish Helmet is a thriller/historical fiction novel by Swiss/New Zealand author Greg Scowen. Published in 2011, it is the first book featuring Scowen's character Dr. Matthew Cameron. The novel received mixed reviews in New Zealand newspapers due to its handling of controversial theories relating to New Zealand's accepted history. While one book reviewer praised the novel for a thought-provoking story-line, another labelled sub-plots of the debut work as laughable. Most agree that despite the sometimes 'clunky' writing, The Spanish Helmet is a fun, easy and quick read.

The peer reviewed journal of the Australian and New Zealand Map Society (The Globe: ISSN 0311-3930) included a review of The Spanish Helmet in their first bi-annual issue of 2013. The reviewer was John Dancy of Ordnance Survey, UK. In summary, the reviewer had some issues with the book which he suggests may come about from his distance from the setting, however he concluded that the story-lines are believable and there is something there to keep you interested until the end. Dancy also commented on the fine use of maps and thorough knowledge of New Zealand presented.

== Alternate history theories ==
New Zealand has numerous pseudohistory theories of pre-Māori settlement and alternative narratives of early European exploration, some of which are explored in this novel. The plot of The Spanish Helmet revolves around a theory that New Zealand was discovered by the crew of a Spanish ship lost at sea in 1526. This theory was originally proposed by Australian writer Robert Langdon in his 1975 work The Lost Caravel. Scowen acknowledges the work of Langdon as the basis for the novel and has intertwined the story of the crew of the San Lesmes beyond their last sighting with the story of a modern-day archaeologist/historian who investigates the suggested New Zealand discovery.

Another possible settlement of New Zealand by Celts is also lightly skirted around.

The explanation for the helmet is in an article by H. Fildes in 'The Dominion' newspaper, Wellington, 3 August 1932, p. 6. It came from Alfred Taine, the son of immigrants to Wellington in 1840. He said an immigrant of 1840 had purchased the helmet when embarking at Gravesend for New Zealand, 'believing the iron headgear would be serviceable as protection when he landed among the savages of New Zealand. On his arrival here he learned a helmet was quite unnecessary, and as he was sufficiently encumbered with his goods and chattels, and not any of his fellow immigrants cared to accept the iron hat, he got rid of it in the most easy way—by tossing it overboard.' The helmet was recovered from Wellington Harbour 'some fifty years ago', this is one time guide to when the helmet was dredged up.

This, as well as the helmet's good condition, lends support to people in the Tower of London who say the helmet was a nineteenth century English musketeer's helmet. Therefore the helmet was probably acquired cheaply at some London outlet disposing of surplus military equipment and was not a valuable sixteenth century antique.

An alternative explanation is provided by an article in The New Zealand Herald, Auckland, 14 Nov 1908, p. 8 about the Dominion Museum, Wellington display of armour given to a Maori Chief by King George IV. It says the Museum also had "an old iron helmet, which was dredged up from Wellington Harbour in the late sixties.". At that time most dredging was near wharves so its likely the helmet was connected with wharf shipping. The article also says the helmet "is of the same design as the newly-found armour of Hongi, and looks as though it might have been a part of it.". A number of other Maori Chiefs were also given armour. It also says the armour was "apparently of the Elizabethan period", which fits with the helmet dating of ca. 1580.

== Awards ==
The novel was selected by the New Zealand Society of Authors for presentation at the Frankfurt Book Fair in 2012, where New Zealand was the guest of honour.
