= New Zealand–Spain relations =

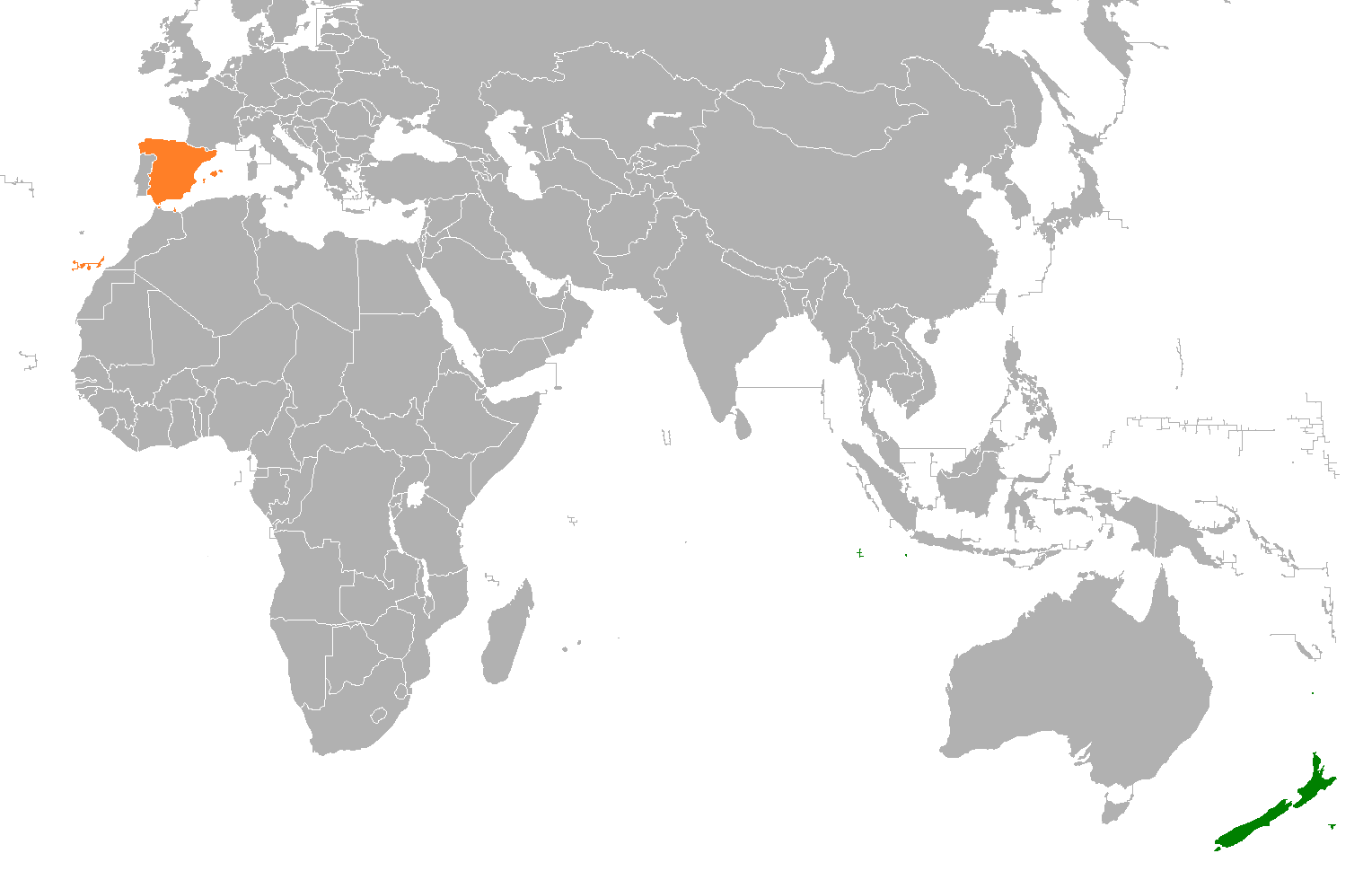

- New Zealand: Spain

New Zealand–Spain relations are the bilateral relations between New Zealand and Spain. Both nations are members of the Organisation for Economic Co-operation and Development and the United Nations.

The two countries are antipodes and their capitals, Madrid and Wellington, are on almost the exact opposite side of the Earth from each other.

== History ==
First contact between Spanish sailors and inhabitants of New Zealand may have transpired between the 16th century and the 17th century, when Spanish galleons sailed the Pacific Ocean. In fact, British historians Alexander Dalrymple and James Burney defended the possibility that the Spanish sailor Juan Fernández was the first European to sight New Zealand, in an expedition to find Terra Australis. Later, Australian researcher Robert Adrian Langdon argued that the crew of the Spanish caravel San Lesmes was shipwrecked on the New Zealand coast. This theory was also supported by the French historian Roger Hervé. Recently, all these hypotheses were studied and represented in the books of the New Zealand author Winston Cowie.

From 1936 to 1938, volunteers from New Zealand set off for Spain to assist the Republican faction during the Spanish Civil War. Over thirty New Zealanders were to fight the war and at least five were killed fighting in Spain. The New Zealand government was officially neutral during the war, however, a group of nurses from the country were deployed to Spain to assist the International Brigades.

Diplomatic relations between New Zealand and Spain were officially established on 28 March 1969. New Zealand opened an embassy in Madrid in 1992 while Spain officially opened an embassy in Wellington in 2006, however, it was officially opened in 2009 during a visit to the country by former Spanish King Juan Carlos I and Queen Sofía. During the Spanish king and queen's second visit to New Zealand, both governments signed agreements for a working holiday visa scheme, an agreement to increase cooperation in international relations and on allowing citizens of both countries to vote in local elections while resident in the territory of the other. From 2001 to 2014, both New Zealand and Spain contributed to troops to the NATO-led Afghan war. In 2014, both nations also supported each other, and were successful, in obtaining non-remanent seats for the 2015–2016 United Nations Security Council period.

== High-level visits ==
High-level visits from New Zealand to Spain

- Prime Minister Jim Bolger (1992)
- Prime Minister Helen Clark (2007)
- Foreign Minister Murray McCully (2014)

High-level visits from Spain to New Zealand

- King Juan Carlos I (1988, 2009)
- Foreign Minister Josep Piqué (2008)
- Felipe, Prince of Asturias (2009)

== Trade ==
In 2017, total trade between New Zealand and Spain amounted to €372 million Euros. New Zealand exports to Spain include: fruit, frozen fish and sheep meat. Spanish exports to New Zealand include: self-propelled railway, tramway coaches, motor vehicles and retail machines. In October 2015, leaders of the European Union (which includes Spain) and New Zealand, announced to start the process for negotiations to a comprehensive free trade agreement.

== Resident diplomatic missions ==
- New Zealand has an embassy in Madrid.
- Spain has an embassy in Wellington.
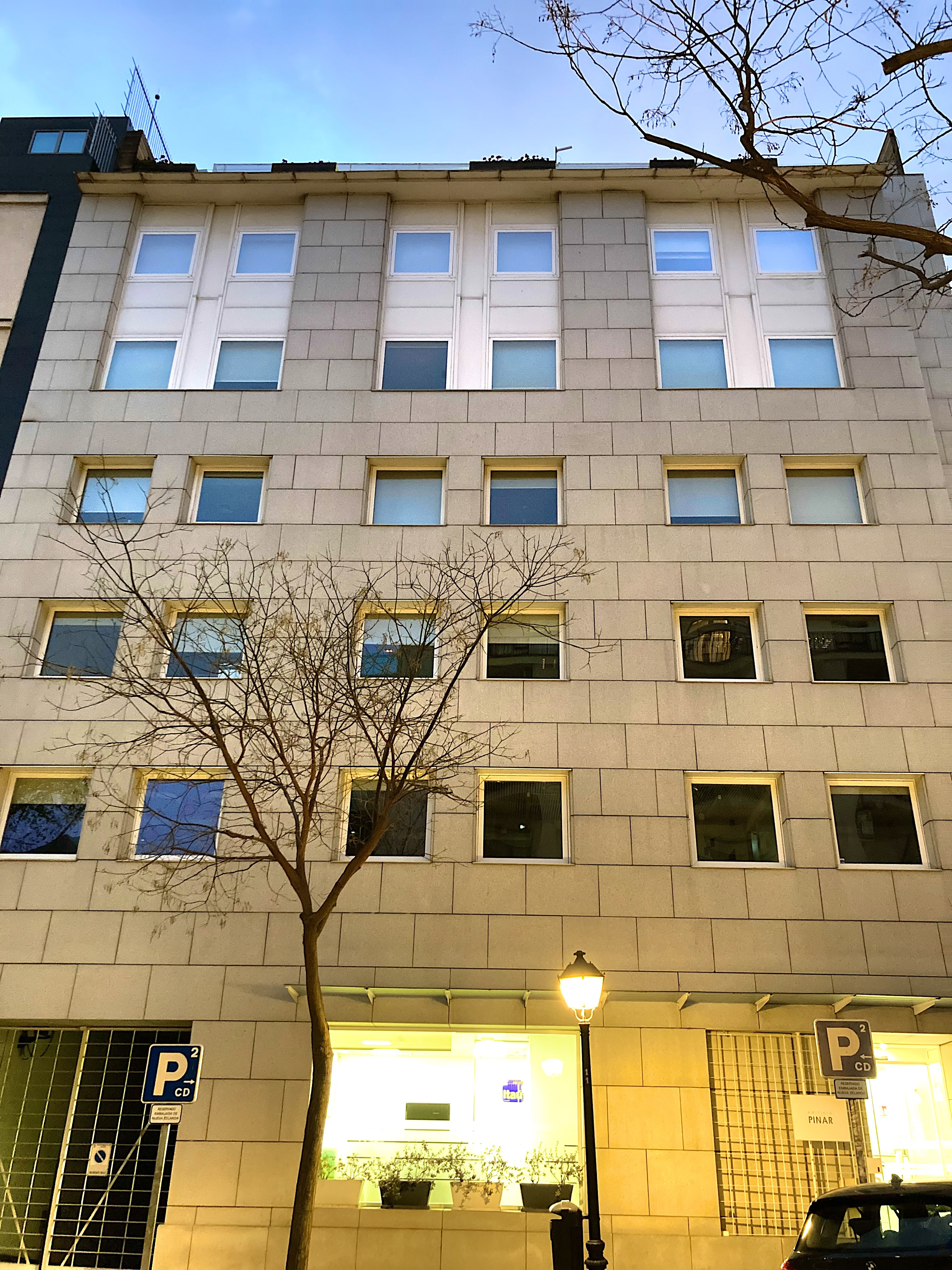
Building hosting the Embassy of New Zealand in Madrid

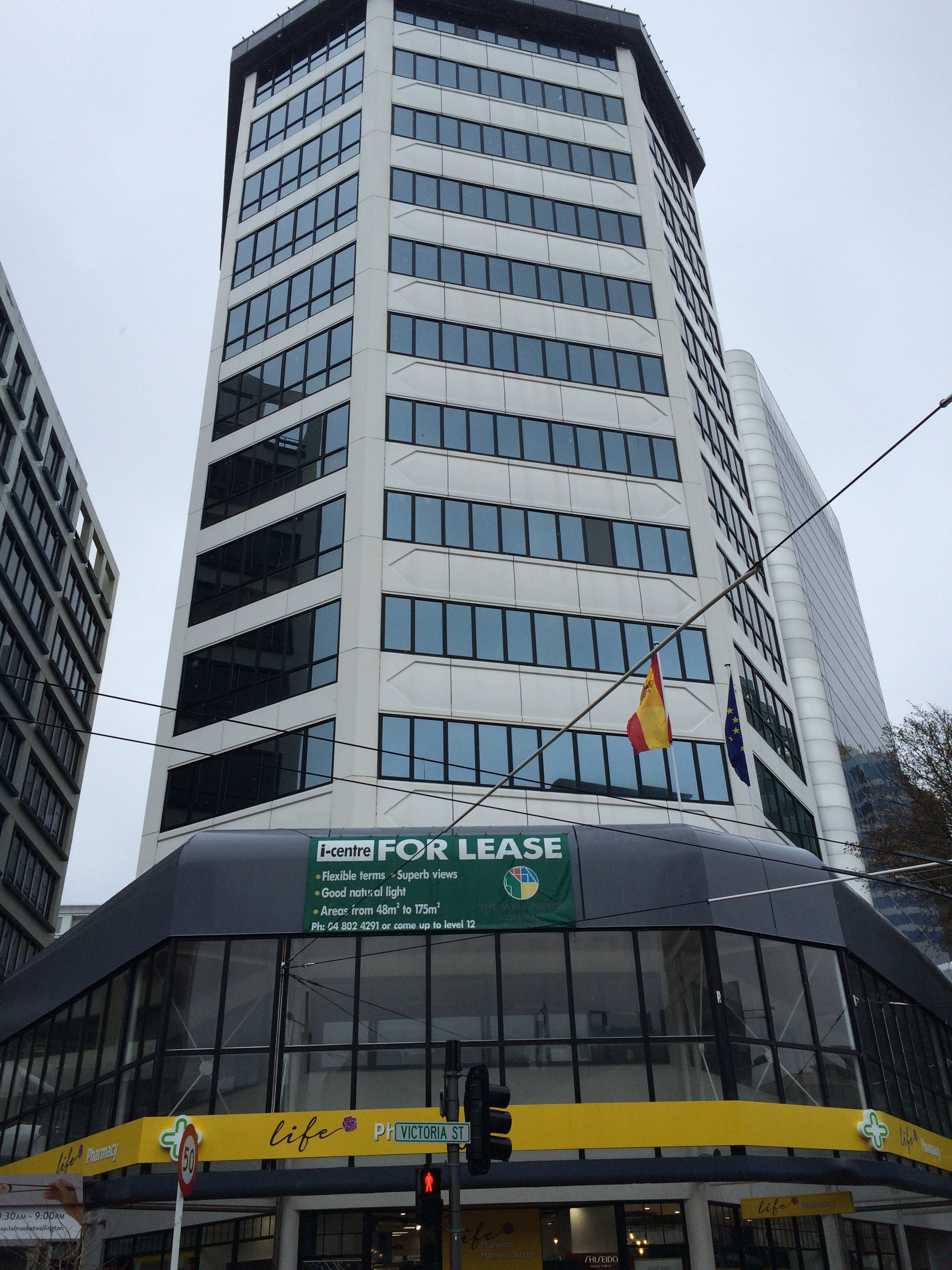
Building hosting the Embassy of Spain in Wellington

== See also ==
- Foreign relations of New Zealand
- Foreign relations of Spain
