= Winston Cowie =

Marine conservationist

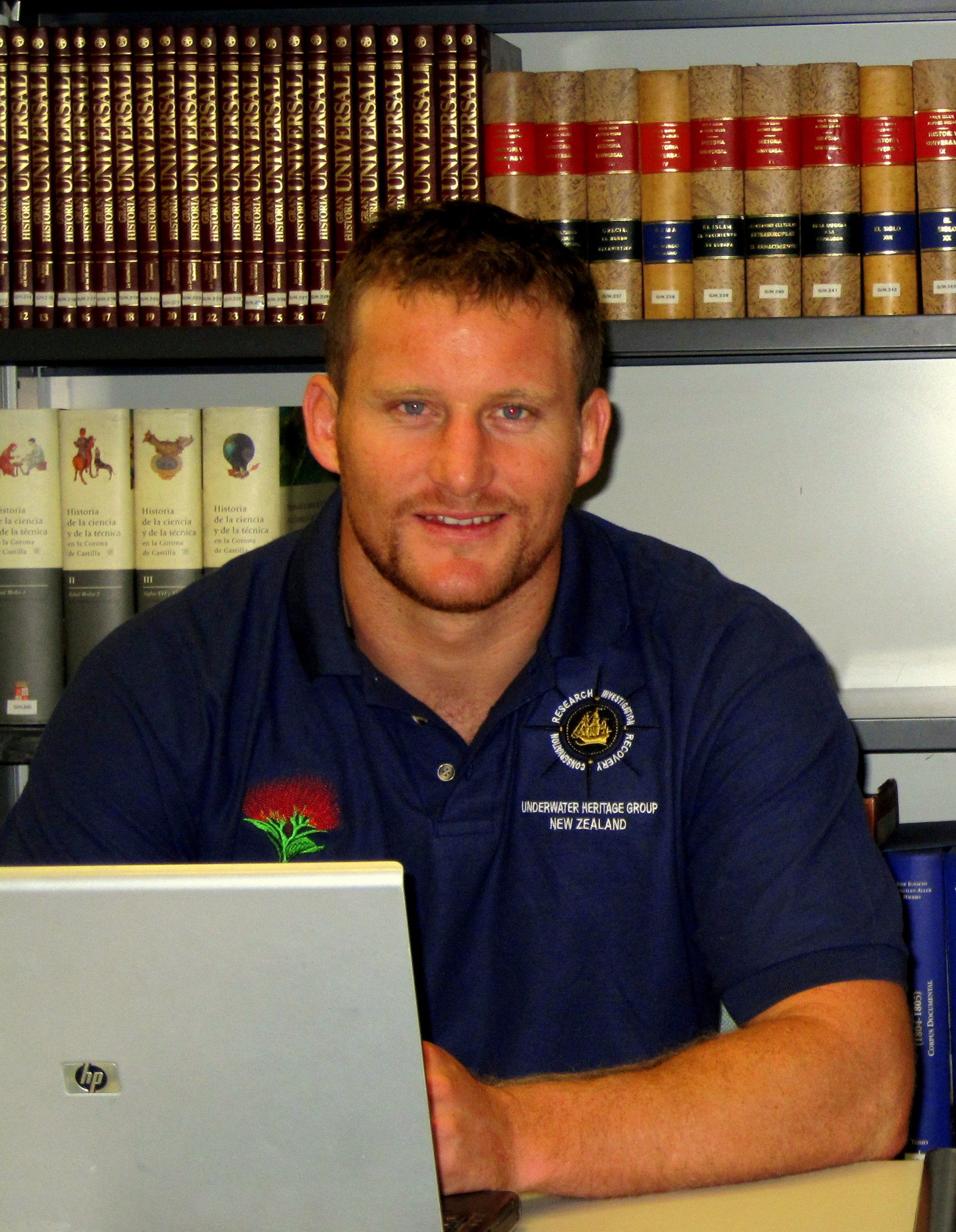
Winston Cowie

Winston Cowie is a Marine conservationist, author and film director.

He is the Manager of Marine Policy at the Environment Agency Abu Dhabi, United Arab Emirates. He is a film director of nature documentaries, New Zealand author of discovery history and the New Zealand Wars, has represented the United Arab Emirates at international rugby, a Master Diver, and is a Fellow of the Royal Geographical Society.

He previously worked as a lawyer before choosing to pursue an MSc in Nature, Society and Environmental Policy from the Oxford University School of Geography and the Environment, Keble College, Oxford University.

== Early years ==
Cowie was born in 1982 in Dargaville, New Zealand, before moving with his parents, Michael and Susan Cowie, and siblings to Matakana, Tawharanui Peninsula in the Mahurangi region. He attended Matakana Primary School, Warkworth Primary School and Westlake Boys High School where he was Head Boy and captain of the 1st XV rugby team. He studied a law degree at Otago University and then was awarded various academic and sporting scholarships to attend Keble College, Oxford University where he graduated from the School of Geography and Environment with an MSc in Nature, Society and Environmental Policy.

Cowie is a descendant of New Zealand Member of Parliament and Invercargill pioneer James Parker Joyce and of Harry Kerr, the first New Zealander to win a medal at the Olympic games. He is married to former Arabian Gulf rugby international Lucy Jones. They have four children.

== Marine policy leadership ==
Winston is a sustainability influencer in the marine policy field having won the Sustainability Manager of the Year Award for the Middle East Region at the Annual Business Leadership Awards in 2021. In addition he has won two Al Dana Pearl Awards for excellence in Environmental Policy presented by the Environment Agency - Abu Dhabi Chairman His Highness Sheikh Hamdan bin Zayed Al Nahyan. The polar explorer Sir Robert Swan awarded him the 'Sir Robert Swan Leadership Award', awarded to him in Antarctica in 2018 where he was a member of Team Zayed representing the Environment Agency Abu Dhabi and Jane Goodall, for leading the sending of a message in solar lights to the world on climate change and single use plastics.

Cowie is a Member of the IUCN Snapper, Seabream and Grunt Specialist Group; IUCN Sustainable Use and Livelihood Group; and IUCN Commission on Environmental, Economic and Social Policy. He is the lead author of the international IUCN Guideline for gathering of fishers knowledge for policy development and applied use (2020) which includes contributions from 50 experts from 16 countries.

Cowie's marine policy work has included climate change; fisheries management; single use plastic; marine litter; non native marine species in the Arabian Gulf and Sea of Oman; and endangered species conservation – dugong and turtles. He was part of the Environment Agency Abu Dhabi and Emirates Nature-WWF team that mapped the movement of Green turtles from foraging grounds in the UAE to Oman and back for the first time. A photo of Cowie jumping on a turtle to tag is the cover shot of the Dive NZ and Pacific magazine. April 2020 edition.

He was part of the Environment Agency Abu Dhabi team that monitored and rescued two whale sharks that visited Abu Dhabi in 2020, untangling fishing gear from one and helping rescue one and move it 20 km back out to sea. He was given the nick-name 'Whale Shark Whisperer' whilst on the community outreach program Whale Shark Watch.

Cowie was the Environment Agency - Abu Dhabi Ambassador on the 2019 world's longest single use plastic free flight on Earth Day 2019 between Abu Dhabi and Melbourne. Etihad Airways removed 95 plastic items – including cups, cutlery, dishes, headset bags and toothbrushes – from the long-haul flight.

Cowie, a Master Diver, has a regular 'Adventures in the Arabian Gulf' column in the Dive NZ magazine and Emirates Diving Association Divers for the Environment Magazine.

== Film director ==
Cowie's most recent film for the Environment Agency Abu Dhabi is Wild Abu Dhabi: The Turtles of Al Dhafra (2021) which screened on National Geographic Abu Dhabi Abu Dhabi TV and Emirates TV and won a finalist award in the Nature & Wildlife documentary category at the New York Festivals TV & Film Awards. It tells the story of three Emirati scientists working in the hottest sea in the world, the Arabian Gulf and the wildest part of Abu Dhabi, Al Dhafra.

Cowie was a judge on the Grand Jury of the New York Festivals TV and Film Awards (2019). To date his most notable work is environmental documentary 'Zayed's Antarctic Lights' (2018) which screened on National Geographic Abu Dhabi and Etihad Airlines. The 57 minute feature documentary won a Bronze World Medal at the New York Festivals TV and Film Awards. It tells the story of Team Zayed from the United Arab Emirates and included Mariam Al Qassimi and Rashed Al Zaabi, who travelled to Antarctica in 2018, to learn about climate change and single use plastics from Sir Robert Swan. Team Zayed represented the Environment Agency Abu Dhabi whose Managing Director H.E. Razan Khalifa Al Mubarak is an Executive Producer and stars in the documentary, as does Secretary General of the agency, H.E. Dr Shaikha Al Dhaheri, who is an Executive Producer. Team Zayed also represented Dr Jane Goodall and her Roots and Shoots programme - both Jane Goodallland. Sir Robert Swan, the first man to walk to both the north pole and south pole, feature in the documentary.

Cowie directed the Environment Agency Abu Dhabi documentary 'Our Sea. Our Heritage' (2019). It is the story of the United Arab Emirates fishery - starting 7000 years ago and canvassing the days of the pearl divers; the oil boom; the decline of the fishery over the past 40 years; and the recovery plan of the Environment Agency - Abu Dhabi. Our Sea. Our Heritage premiered at the Abu Dhabi International Boatshow 16–19 October 2019.

Cowie was a Dive Supervisor on the NHNZ New Zealand underwater six part series diving in the Northland Harbours and Poor Knights episodes. He found a sea taonga whilst diving at Tawharanui which he returned to Maori elders.

Mystery at Midge Bay was co-produced by Cowie and David Sims, presented by Cowie and directed by Sims. The 50 minute documentary investigates the theory that the Spanish or Portuguese might have been the first Europeans to discover New Zealand, before the Dutchman Abel Tasman in 1642. It screened at the Matakana Cinema and Kumara Box in Dargaville, December 2012.

== Antarctica ==
Cowie has visited Antarctica twice with Sir Robert Swan on the International Antarctic Expedition. In 2018 he was a participant of Abu Dhabi's Team Zayed, which sent a message to the world in solar lights about climate change and single use plastic. Cowie directed a film on the expedition called Zayed's Antarctic Lights which screened on National Geographic and which won and international award. In 2022 he was the Program Director of the expedition for Sir Robert's NGO '2041' leading the 'Leadership on the Edge program' for 177 persons from 37 countries, in addition to being part of the UAE Antarctic Team. The team recorded concerning climate change impacts whilst in Antarctica.

== Rugby, Triathlon and charity work ==
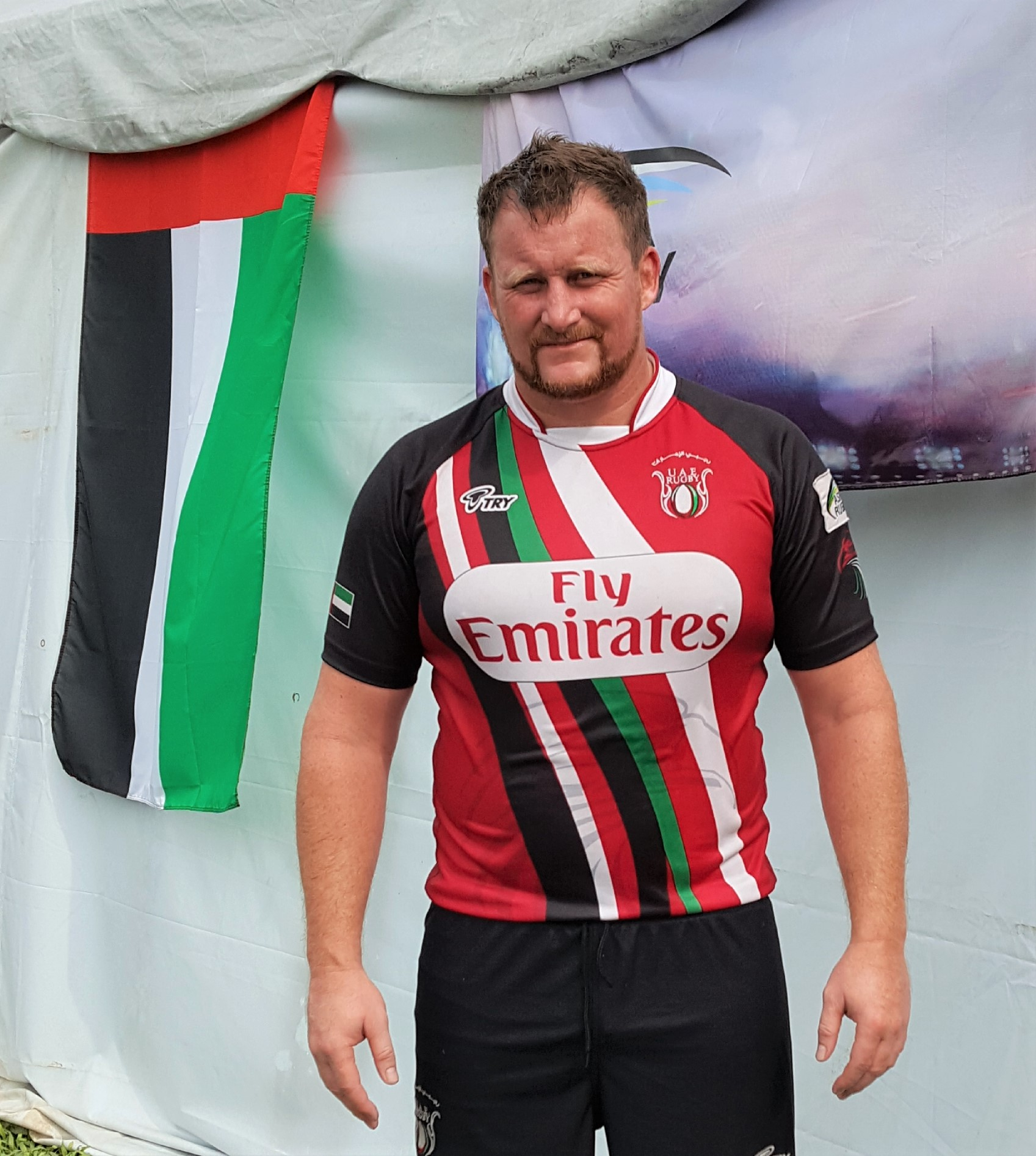
Cowie played rugby for Oxford University and debuted for the United Arab Emirates in 2017 in the Asian Championship.

Cowie played international rugby union for the United Arab Emirates in 2017 playing in the Asia Rugby Division 1 championships in Malaysia. He was a hooker, prop and No.8.

Cowie played in the Varsity Match in 2006 and 2007 for Oxford University v Cambridge University. Former Australian wing Joe Roff was his captain. He toured Japan and the US with the Oxford team. Cowie also represented Oxford University at athletics and surfing. His Keble College rugby team won the Oxford Rugby Cuppers tournament in 2007 with Cowie scoring in the final.

Cowie was captain of the Doha and Mahurangi Rugby Club, and played for the Harbour Hawks in Dunedin and the British Penguins in the Orkney Islands, Scotland.

In 2016 with friend Mike Ballard and the Mike Ballard Foundation he led a goodwill mission to Seychelles and Madagascar that featured on World Rugby TV. The Air Seychelles Mike Ballard Foundation Conquistadors were made up of eight clubs from the Arabian Gulf. The team led rugby coaching clinics with junior players and donated rugby boots and kit. The goodwill mission featured on World Rugby TV and the Mike Ballard Foundation Committee were awarded UAE volunteers of the year.

Cowie represented the United Arab Emirates in the World Triathlon Age Group Championships in 2022 and 2023 in the Super Sprint, placing 16th and 27th in the world respectively in his age group.

== Author ==
Cowie writes about the history of New Zealand – early European exploration and the New Zealand Land Wars. He has written five books: Conquistador Puzzle Trail; Nueva Zelanda, un puzzle histórico: tras la pista de los conquistadores españoles; A Flame Flickers in the Darkness; Greenstone Trail; and Flames Flicker. His most notable work is Conquistador Puzzle Trail which is also available in Spanish and was added to Te Ara the online encyclopaedia of New Zealand as a source on the theory that the Spanish or Portuguese may have been the first Europeans to discover New Zealand. The New Zealand Māori were the original inhabitants - Cowie's books are about the European voyages of exploration and discovery.

Cowie assesses the Spanish theories that Juan Fernández (1576–1578) or the San Lesmes (1525–1526) of the Loaísa expedition voyaged to New Zealand pre-Abel Tasman – as proposed by Chilean historian Jose Torobio Medina and Australian researcher Robert Adrian Langdon in The Lost Caravel respectively. Cowie concludes that these Spanish voyages may have occurred with more evidence required to prove that they conclusively did.

Cowie's original research included interviews with elderly residents of the Pouto Peninsula – oral tradition which included stories of shipwrecks, intermarriage between wrecked sailors and local Maori, artefacts being found and reburied, and early settlers describing local Maori as having red hair and complexions similar to the Portuguese and Spaniards. He concludes that the San Lesmes may have been wrecked on Baylys Beach, Northland, New Zealand and may be buried under the sand there - with more research needed to take the theory from possibility to probability. Local oral tradition and ethnographic evidence supports this theory. Part of Cowie's research involved investigating the date of the large Pohutukawa tree at the La Coruna Police Station, endemic to New Zealand. Cowie through the generosity of the late master carver Kerry Strongman, gifted the tree a greenstone taonga representative of the links between Spain and New Zealand.

Cowie concludes that 'on the balance of probabilities' the Portuguese discovered Australia. Winston Cowie appeared on TVNZ's Breakfast programme talking about the Portuguese and Spanish theories on 28 October 2019.

Cowie's book sparked an international debate on the Spanish and Portuguese discovery subject with articles in: El País, Mahurangi Matters, Otago Daily Times, The Listener, and The New Zealand Herald. El País, the Spanish national newspaper wrote 'Theory that New Zealand was discovered by Spain gains new traction'; Mahurangi Matters wrote 'Pieces falling into place in Conquistador trail.

In December 2019 and March 2020 Cowie launched a two part competition in his column in the Dive NZ and Pacific magazine entitled The Great New Zealand Historical Treasure Hunt where readers were asked to send in ideas on what additional research could be done to explore the theories further.

Cowie is the author of the New Zealand Wars historical fiction novel A Flame Flickers in the Darkness which took him six years to write. It was later split into two Amazon Kindle ebooks Greenstone Trail and Flames Flicker. A Flame Flickers in the Darkness follows the adventures of Whero, a young Maori warrior and Jack O'Malley, a young Irish whaler during the New Zealand Land Wars of the 1860s .The novel spans the New Zealand Wars of the 1860s with these two fictional characters interacting with the key persons of this period. It covers the First Taranaki War, Waikato War, Second Taranaki War, and Te Kooti's East Coast uprising. The book received good reviews, some from the descendants of the real people Cowie wrote about during the land wars period, including from a grandchild of Titokowaru, Kuia Te Rau Oriwa Davis and Sam Priest, a descendant of Captain John Roberts. Since writing the book Cowie has published articles on the importance of New Zealand wars history, also talking on the Radio. He is a supporter of the New Zealand Wars being taught in schools - his most recent article in the NZ Herald: History lessons – what makes New Zealand great?

== Awards ==
- Sustainability Manager of the Year Award - Middle East region (2021)
- Finalist Award - New York Festivals TV and Film Awards - Wild Abu Dhabi: The Turtles of Al Dhafra (2021)
- Bronze World Medal - New York Festivals TV and Film Awards - Zayed's Antarctic Lights, Director (2019).
- Al Dana Pearl Awards - Excellence in Environmental Policy, Environment Agency - Abu Dhabi (2015, 2019)
- Best Sustainability Communication's Campaign, Middle East. Abu Dhabi Sustainability Group Awards. Team Zayed (2019)
- Sir Robert Swan Leadership Inspiration Award, International Antarctic Expedition (2018).
- Major Stanley Scholarship, Oxford University - excellence in rugby union and academics (2006).
- Ian Tucker Memorial Scholarship, Keble College, Oxford University - excellence in rugby and academics (2006).
