= Australia–Spain relations =

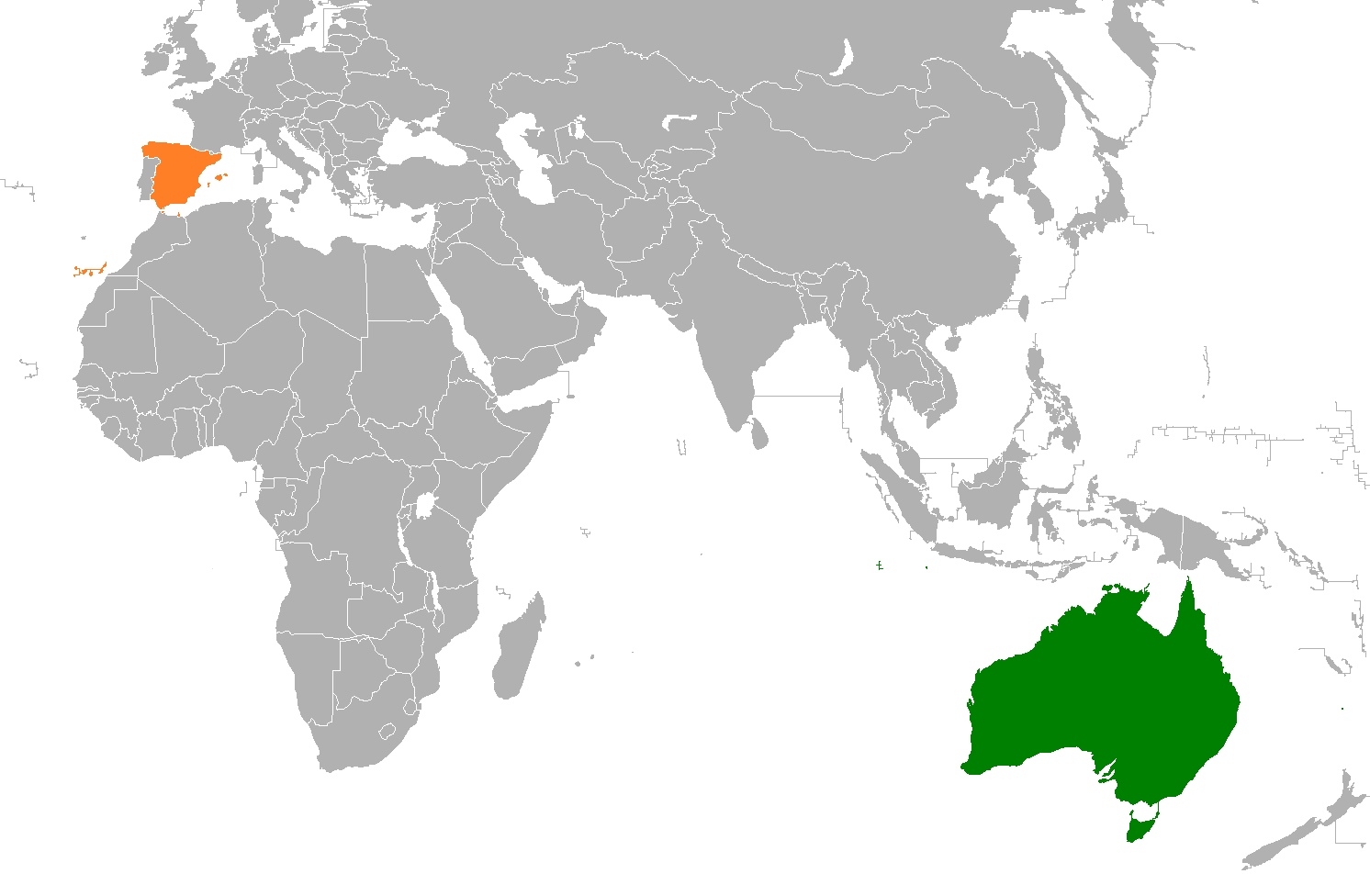

- Australia: Spain

Diplomatic relations exist between Australia and Spain. Both nations are members of the Organisation for Economic Co-operation and Development.

== Historical relations ==
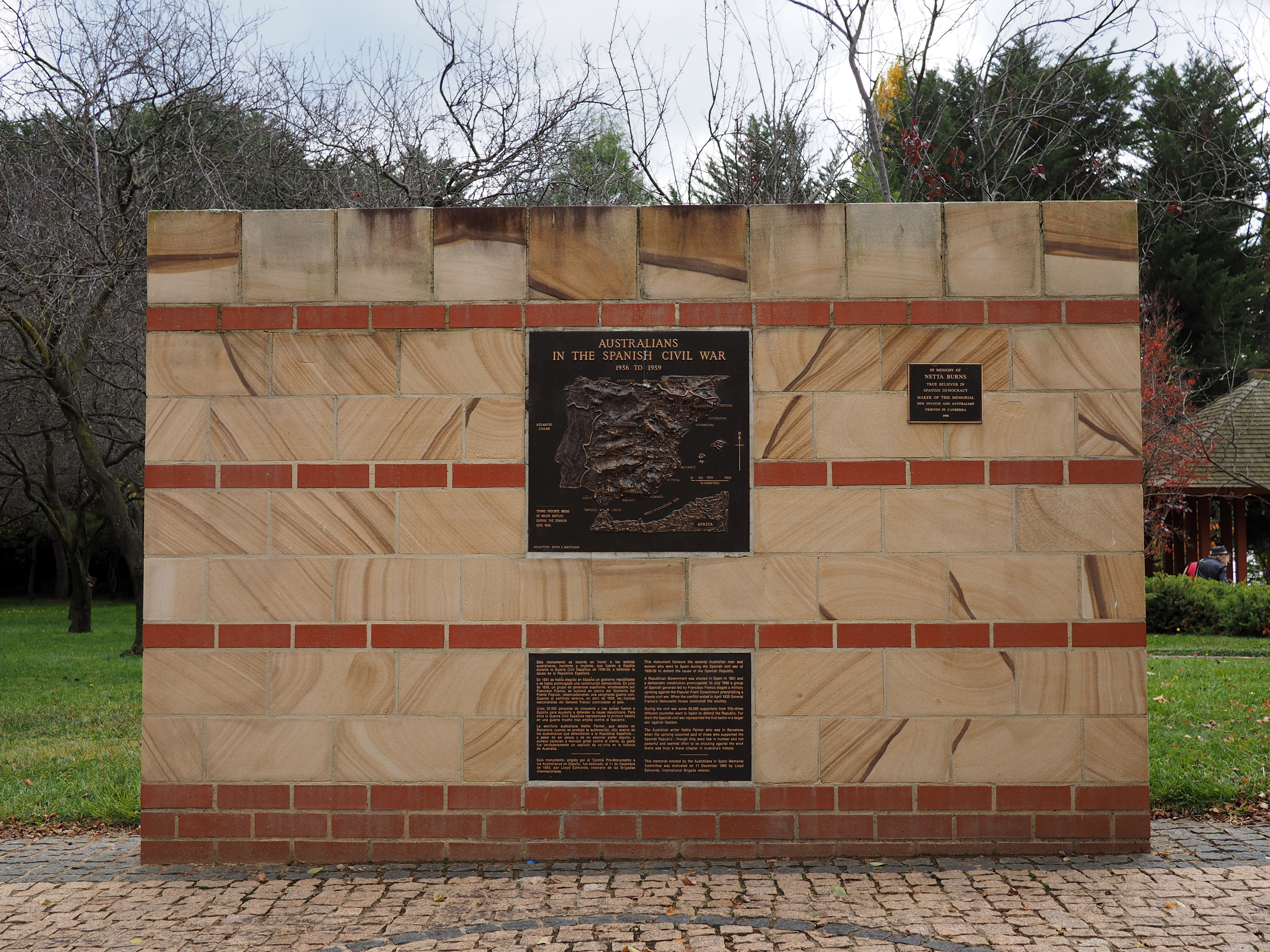
Memorial to the Spanish Civil War in Canberra.

The earliest writings on the discovery of mainland Australia by European explorers date back to the early 17th century. However, Australian researcher Lawrence Hargrave argued that Spain had already established a colony in Botany Bay in the 16th century, a time when expeditions were organised to find Terra Australis. Later, French historian Roger Hervé claimed that the Spanish caravel San Lesmes was diverted to New Zealand and Tasmania, until it went up the Australian eastern coast and was captured by the Portuguese near what is now Cape York. In fact, a similar hypothesis was formulated by the Australian researcher Robert Adrian Langdon. In 1606, the Spanish sailor Luís Vaz de Torres, belonging to the expedition of the Portuguese explorer Queirós, was one of the first European explorers to encounter Australia and the first to map the Torres Strait, which is named in his honour. In 1793, the Malaspina Expedition sailed to Port Jackson (Sydney) on the coast of New South Wales, which had been established by the British in 1788.

Since the initial encounter, relations between Australia and Spain would not develop until the 20th century. From 1936 to 1939, Spain was embroiled in a civil war between the Republican faction and Nationalist faction. Australia was officially neutral during the conflict. However, over 66 Australians volunteered and fought for the Republican faction in Spain as part of the British Battalion.

== Diplomatic relations ==
On 26 October 1967, both countries established diplomatic relations, being named the first Chargé d'Affaires in Canberra on December 9 of the same year. Likewise, on 3 May 1968, the Spanish embassy in Canberra was inaugurated. On the other hand, in 2008, the twinning between the cities of Adelaide (Australia) and Ferrol (Spain) was established to report commercial, cultural, tourist, and academic benefits.

Over recent years, bilateral relations have experienced substantial advances in the political, economic, cultural, scientific fields, in the so-called ‘diplomacy between peoples’ and in parliamentary diplomacy. The Australian diplomat, Timothy Kane, affirmed that the bilateral relationship ‘has strengthened in the last decade’, as evidenced by the fact that Spanish shipyards have built ‘115,000 tons of fleet for the Royal Australian Navy’, in addition to the fact that 80 Spanish companies operate there successfully and 40 Australian companies are established in Spain. Kane opted for ‘exploring new opportunities in the distribution, health, agri-food, automotive, and pharmaceutical sectors.’ Finally, he announced that ‘the most important Australian trade delegation in years’ will visit Spain in July and will be led by a minister from his Government.

The director general of the Ministry of Foreign Affairs of North America, Asia and the Pacific, Fidel Sendagorta, stressed that both countries also share values, which will facilitate the work in the UN Human Rights Council for the period 2018-2020. On the other hand, the foreign representative stated that Spain ‘is going to support Australia in its negotiation with the EU to sign a Free Trade Agreement’. Finally, he announced the extension of the Working Holidays agreement, which currently benefits 1,500 young people from both countries. In addition, according to the Instituto Cervantes in Sydney, Spanish is becoming a popular language to study among Australians.

In 2018, both countries celebrated the 50th anniversary of bilateral relations to expand and mutually reinforce them in all fields, coinciding with Australia Day. In addition, both countries tend to develop increasingly cordial and strategic relations. Australia and Spain share shared democratic values, and trade and investment ties are strong. Spanish companies are bringing significant experience and knowledge to the transport, infrastructure and renewable energy generation sectors in Australia. These companies have established a strong and growing presence, including by establishing bases in Australia for their operations in the Indo-Pacific region. Australian companies are increasingly interested in Spain and have a growing number of investments in the country, especially in the field of financial services, software development and mining. Defence and military material are a key element of the bilateral relationship. Spanish companies have won important contracts for the construction of defence material, and cooperation between the Royal Australian Navy and the Spanish Navy is especially close.

In 2023, the Centre for the Development of Industrial Technology (CDTI) selected Destinus to invest in its aviation project, known as the Plan Tecnológico Aeronáutico (PTA), which will develop green hydrogen hypersonic engines to shorten the distance of travel between Australia and Europe. Likewise, the Spanish company Talgo is studying taking its trains to Australia to communicate and reduce journey times between the cities of Adelaide, Canberra, Melbourne, and Sydney. In May of the same year, both countries commemorated their 55 years of diplomatic relations.

== Bilateral relations ==
On 26 October 1967, Australia and Spain officially established diplomatic relations. In May 1968, Spain opened an embassy in the Australian capital of Canberra. In June 1988, King Juan Carlos I and Queen Sofía paid an official visit to Australia.

Throughout the years, both nations have signed numerous bilateral agreements such as an Extradition Treaty (1987); Agreement on Cultural, Education and Scientific cooperation (1991); Agreement on the Avoidance of Double-Taxation and the Prevention of Tax Evasion (1992); Agreement on Social Security (2002); Agreement on Air services (2009) and a Working holiday visa agreement (2014).

On 28 June 2022, Australian prime minister Anthony Albanese met with Spanish prime minister Pedro Sánchez in La Moncloa (in the first formal visit of an Australian prime minister to Spain), agreeing on the sending of a Spanish high-level trade delegation to Australia, and reaffirmed the commitment of both countries to a rapid conclusion of a ‘comprehensive and ambitious’ Trade Agreement between Australia and the European Union.

== High-level visits ==
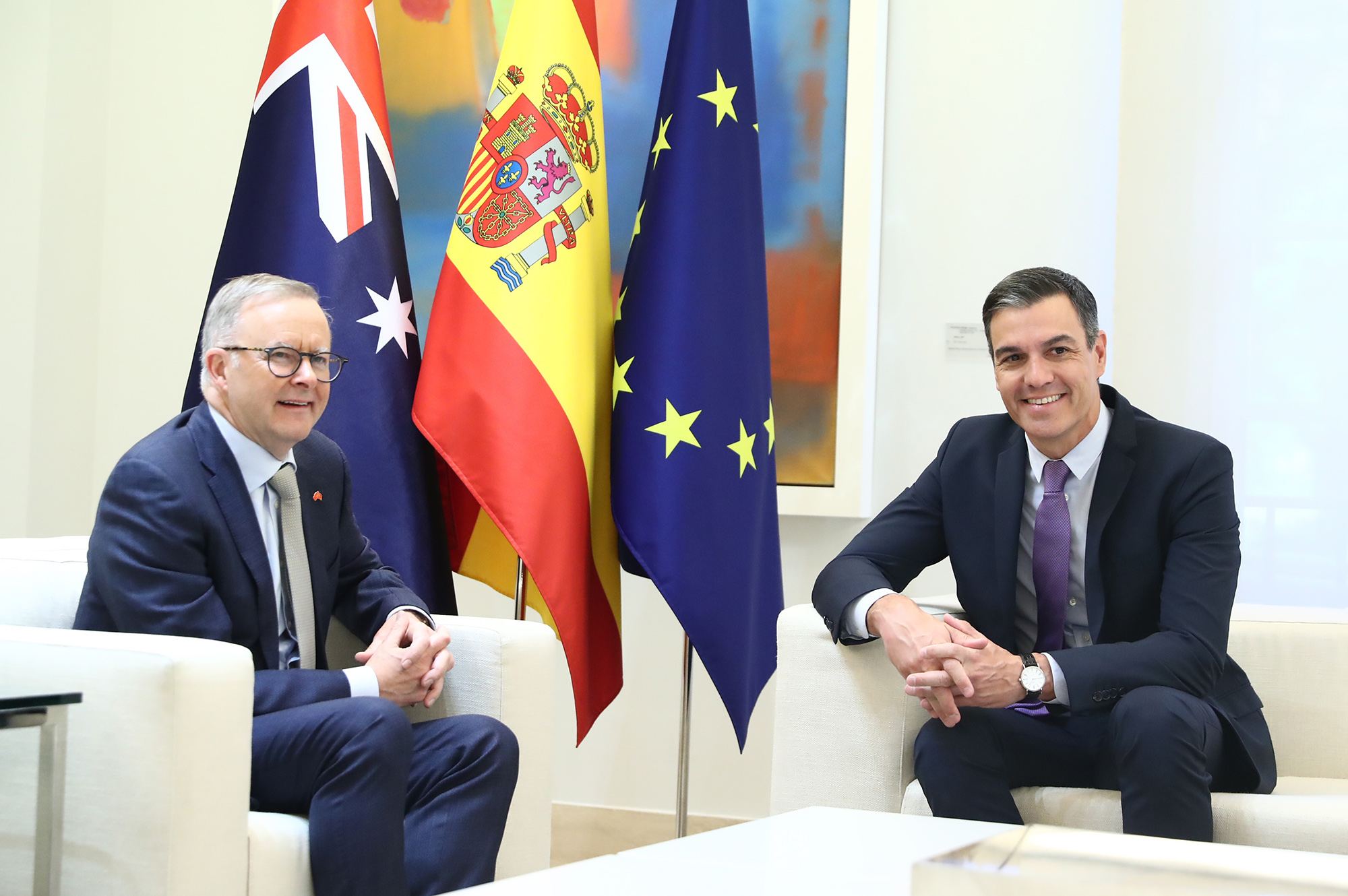
Spanish Prime Minister Pedro Sánchez and Australian Prime Minister Anthony Albanese in Madrid; June 2022.

High-level visits from Australia to Spain

- Governor-General Quentin Bryce (2011)
- Governor-General Peter Cosgrove (2018)
- Prime Minister Anthony Albanese (2022)

High-level visits from Spain to Australia

- King Juan Carlos I (1988, 2009)
- Crowned Prince Felipe (1990)
- Prime Minister Mariano Rajoy (2014)

== Trade ==
In 2017, trade between Australia and Spain totalled US$3.4 billion. Australian merchandise exports to Spain were valued at $697 million, and included coal, other ores and concentrates, fruit and nuts, and electronic integrated circuits. Spanish merchandise exports to Australia were valued at $2 billion, with the biggest import items being passenger motor vehicles, medicaments (including veterinary), fixed vegetable oils and fats, and rubber tyres, treads and tubes. In 2016, Australian investments in Spain totalled US$5.1 billion and at the same time, Spanish investments in Australia totalled US$948 million.

== Diaspora ==
In the 2016 Australian Census, 120,952 Australian residents claimed Spanish descent, while 15,391 indicated they were born in Spain.

== Resident diplomatic missions ==
of Australia in Spain

- Madrid (Embassy)

of Spain in Australia

- Canberra (Embassy)
- Melbourne (Consulate-General)
- Sydney (Consulate-General)

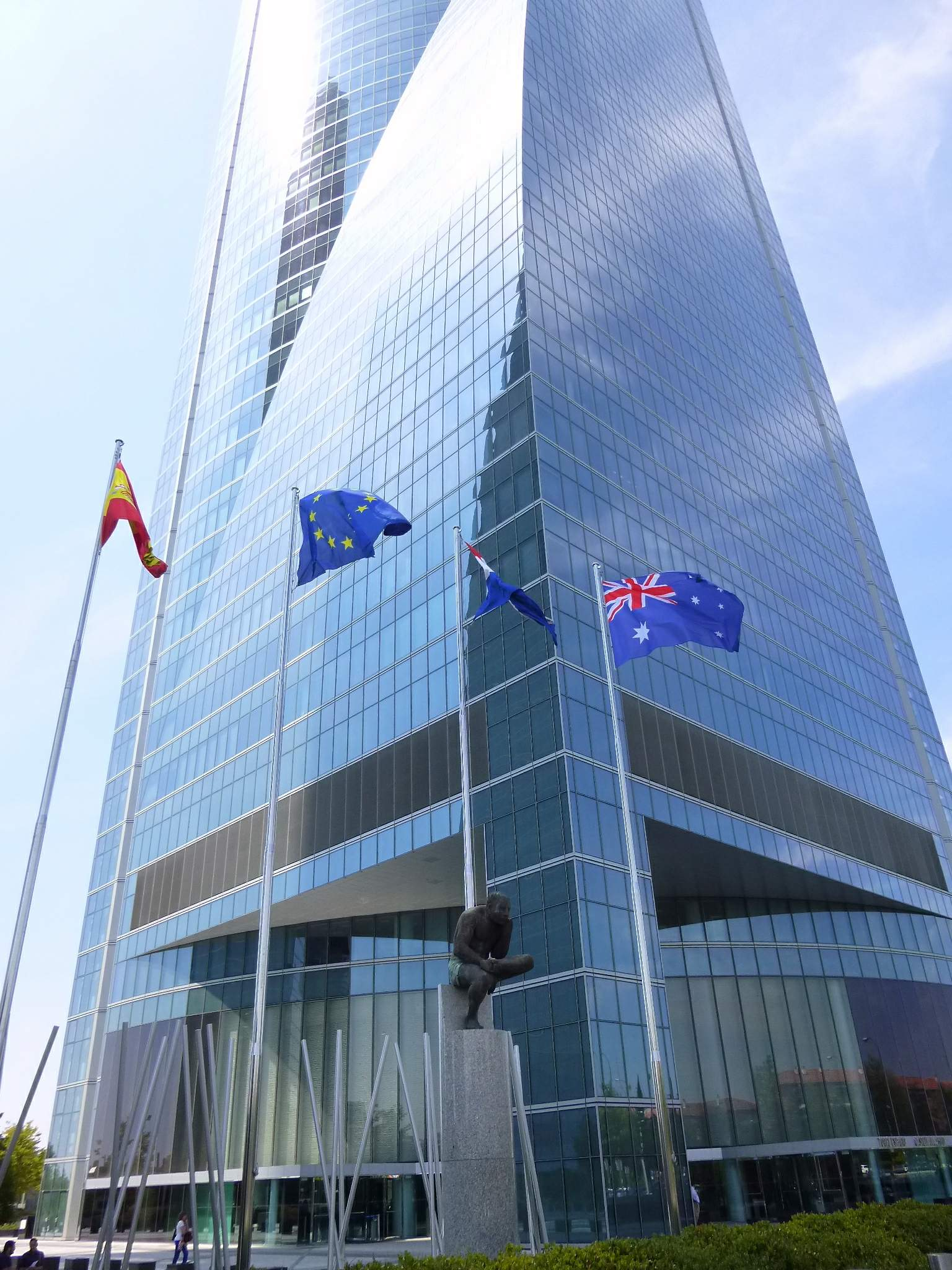
Torre Espacio which houses the Embassy of Australia in Madrid

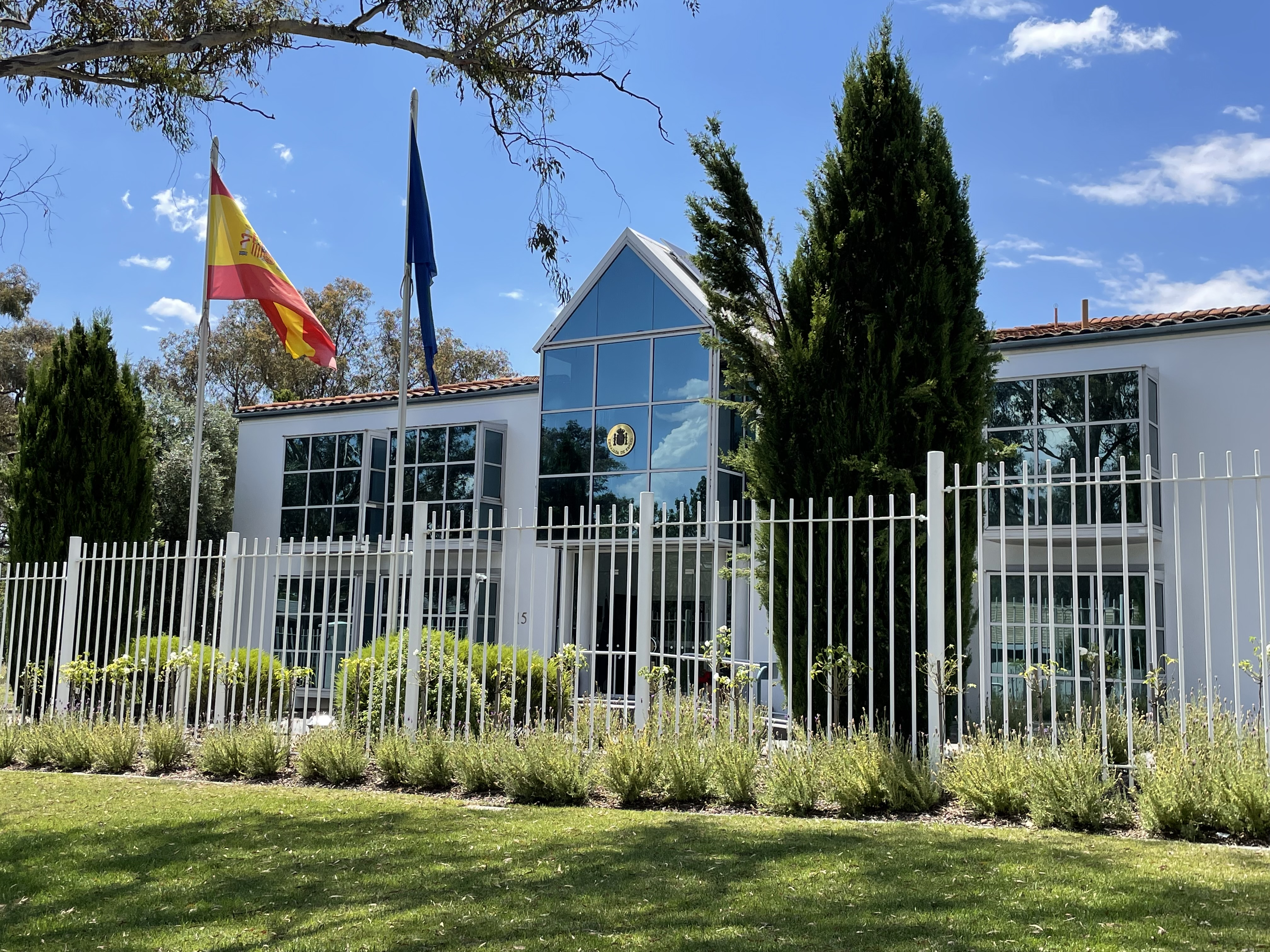
Embassy of Spain in Canberra

== See also ==
- Foreign relations of Australia
- Foreign relations of Spain
