= Robert Adrian Langdon =

Australian scholar

Robert Langdon (1924–2003) was an Australian scholar known for his work as the executive officer of the Pacific Manuscripts Bureau, a part of the Australian National University.

== Biography ==
Langdon was born in Adelaide, served in the Royal Australian Navy during the Second World War, skipped university in favor of a writing career, and spent six years exploring South America. He undertook many different jobs prior to making his way to Tahiti to escape a cold Canadian winter. This journey changed his life. Because he couldn't find a single book that told the story of Tahiti, he returned home to Adelaide and wrote his own: Tahiti, Island of Love. After some time reporting for The Advertiser in Adelaide, Langdon took on a role at Pacific Islands Monthly in Sydney. During his six years at the magazine his reputation for original and high quality research on forgotten aspects of Pacific history caught the attention of Professor Henry Maude who was setting up the Pacific Manuscripts Bureau (PMB).

One of the first major projects he supervised as the executive officer of the PMB in the 1970s was the microfilming of more than 2,100 logbooks of American whaling, trading and naval ships active in the Pacific in the 19th century. Copies of these 420 reels of microfilm were then distributed to a number of participating libraries in Australia, New Zealand and Hawaii. To increase their utility, he supervised a team of researchers to index the microfilmed logbooks and the results were later published in two volumes.

== Historical theories ==
Langdon's research on the history of Amanu island and the possible origin of antique Spanish ship cannons discovered on the atoll in 1929 resulted in his book The Lost Caravel. In this book Langdon presented evidence for his theory that the cannons were from the San Lesmes, a ship of the Spanish Loaísa expedition. Langdon proposed that the San Lesmes had foundered on the atoll, thrown off the cannons to refloat, sailed to Tahiti where some members of the crew remained, then sailed onward to discover New Zealand. New Zealand film maker Winston Cowie's books Conquistador Puzzle Trail (2015) and Nueva Zelanda, un puzzle histórico: tras la pista de los conquistadores españoles (2016), published with the support of the Embassy of Spain to New Zealand, address the San Lesmes theory and consistent with Langdon's theory propose that it may have been wrecked in New Zealand, with oral tradition from elders on the Pouto Peninsula recording a wreck described as 'Spanish', and helmets and armour that had been found in the sand and caves of the peninsula.

Greg Scowen's 2011 novel The Spanish Helmet also references the San Lesmes theory, basing much of the story on the presumed journal of the captain of the San Lesmes, Francisco de Hoces.

== See also ==
- Pacific Manuscripts Bureau
