= Horst P. Horst =

German-American photographer (1906–1999)

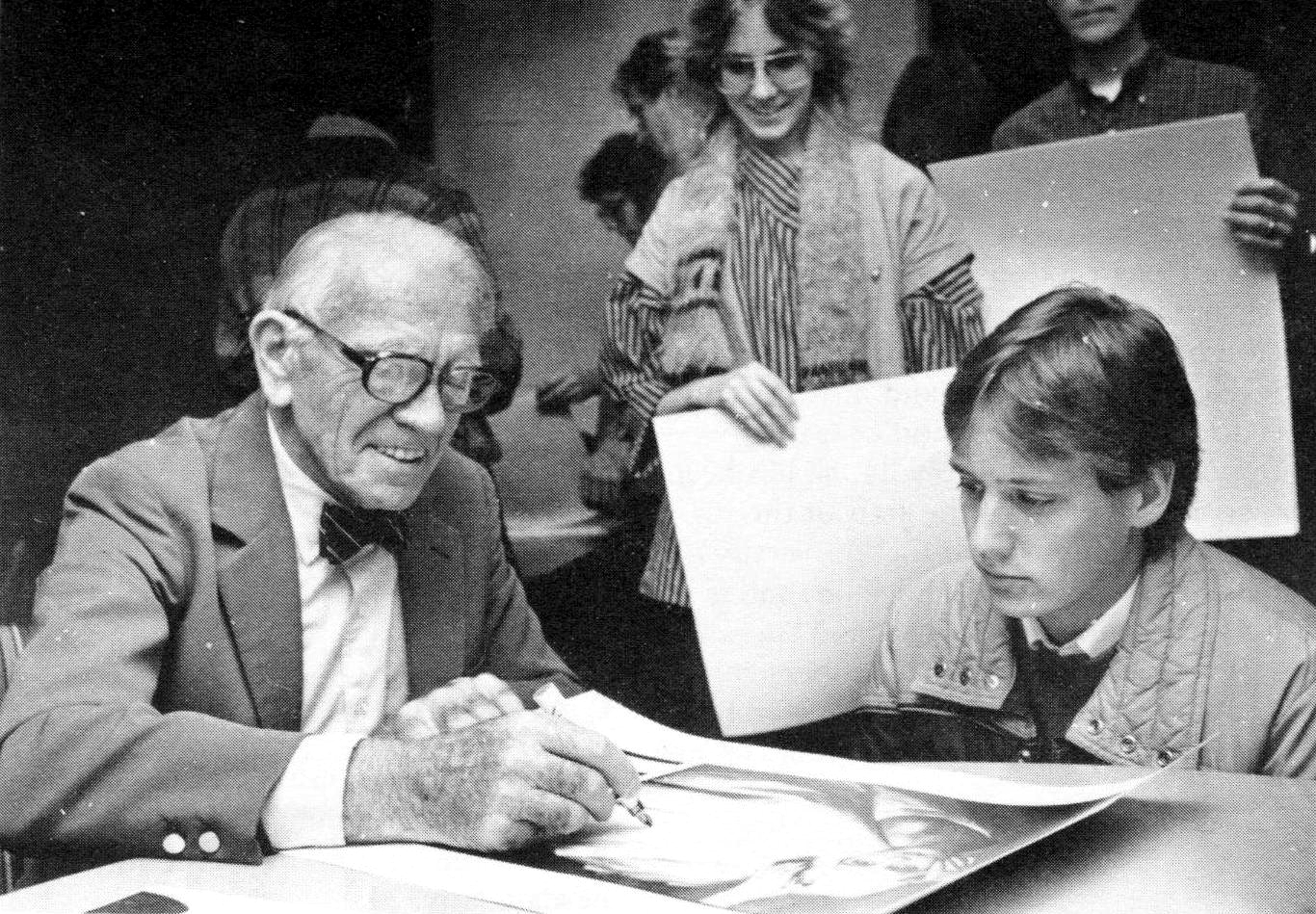
- Horst signing autographs in 1984
- Born: Horst Paul Albert Bohrmann; August 14, 1906; Weißenfels-an-der-Saale, German Empire
- Died: November 18, 1999 (aged 93); Palm Beach Gardens, Florida, United States
- Known for: Photography

Horst P. Horst (born Horst Paul Albert Bohrmann; August 14, 1906 – November 18, 1999) was a German-American fashion photographer.

== Early life ==
The younger of the sons, Horst was born in Weissenfels an der Saale, Germany, to Klara (Schönbrodt) and Max Bohrmann. His father was a successful merchant. In his teens, he met dancer Evan Weidemann at the home of his aunt, and this aroused his interest in avant-garde art. In the late 1920s, Horst studied at Hamburg Kunstgewerbeschule, leaving there in 1930 to go to Paris to study under the architect Le Corbusier.

== Youth ==
While in Paris, Horst befriended many people in the art community and visited many galleries. In 1930 he met Vogue photographer Baron George Hoyningen-Huene, a half-Baltic, half-American nobleman, and became his photographic assistant, occasional model, and lover. He traveled to England with him that winter. While there, they visited photographer Cecil Beaton, who was working for the British edition of Vogue. In 1931, Horst began his association with Vogue, publishing his first photograph in French Vogue in December of that year. It was a full-page advertisement showing a model in black velvet holding a Klytia scent bottle.

His first exhibition took place at La Plume d'Or in Paris in 1932. It was reviewed by Janet Flanner in The New Yorker, and this review, which appeared after the exhibition ended, made Horst instantly prominent. Horst made a portrait of Bette Davis the same year, the first in a series of public figures he would photograph during his career. Within a few years, he had photographed Noël Coward, Yvonne Printemps, Lisa Fonssagrives, Count Luchino Visconti di Madrone, Duke Fulco di Verdura, Baron Nicolas de Gunzburg, Princess Natalia Pavlovna Paley, Daisy Fellowes, Princess Marina of Greece and Denmark, Cole Porter, Elsa Schiaparelli, Eve Curie, Aimée de Heeren, and others.

Horst rented an apartment in New York City in 1937, and while residing there met Coco Chanel, whom Horst called "the queen of the whole thing". He would photograph her fashions for three decades.

He met Valentine Lawford, British diplomat in 1938, and they lived together until Lawford's death in 1991. Horst adopted a son, Richard J. Horst, whom they raised together.

In 1941, Horst applied for United States citizenship. In 1942, he passed an Army physical, and joined the Army on July 2, 1943. On October 21, he received his United States citizenship as Horst P. Horst. He became an Army photographer, with much of his work printed in the forces' magazine Belvoir Castle. In 1945, he photographed United States President Harry S. Truman, with whom he became friends, and he photographed every First Lady in the post-war period at the invitation of the White House. In 1947, Horst moved into his house in Oyster Bay, New York. He designed the white stucco-clad building himself, the design inspired by the houses that he had seen in Tunisia during his relationship with Hoyningen-Huene.

== Work ==
Horst is best known for his photographs of women and fashion, but is also recognized for his photographs of interior architecture, still lifes, especially ones including plants, and environmental portraits. One of the great iconic photos of the 20th century is "The Mainbocher Corset" with its erotically charged mystery, captured by Horst in Vogue’s Paris studio in 1939. Designers like Donna Karan continue to use the timeless beauty of "The Mainbocher Corset" as an inspiration for their outerwear collections today. His work frequently reflects his interest in surrealism and his regard of the ancient Greek ideal of physical beauty.

His method of work typically entailed careful preparation for the shoot, with the lighting and studio props (of which he used many) arranged in advance. His instructions to models are remembered as being brief and to the point. His published work uses lighting to pick out the subject; he frequently used four spotlights, often one of them pointing down from the ceiling. Only rarely do his photos include shadows falling on the background of the set. Horst rarely, if ever, used filters. While most of his work is in black and white, much of his color photography includes largely monochromatic settings to set off a colorful fashion. Horst's color photography did include documentation of society interior design, well noted in the volume Horst Interiors. He photographed a number of interiors designed by Robert Denning and Vincent Fourcade of Denning & Fourcade and often visited their homes in Manhattan and Long Island. After taking the photograph, Horst generally left it up to others to develop, print, crop, and edit his work.

One of his most famous portraits is of Marlene Dietrich, taken in 1942. She protested the lighting that he had selected and arranged, but he used it anyway. Dietrich liked the results and subsequently used a photo from the session in her own publicity.

Less well known are his nude photographs.

== Later life ==
In the 1960s, encouraged by Vogue editor Diana Vreeland, Horst began a series of photos illustrating the lifestyle of international high society which included Consuelo Vanderbilt, Marella Agnelli, Gloria Guinness, Baroness Pauline de Rothschild and Baron Philippe de Rothschild, Helen of Greece and Denmark, Baroness Geoffroy de Waldner, Princess Tatiana of Sayn-Wittgenstein-Berleburg, Lee Radziwill, Duke of Windsor and Duchess of Windsor, Peregrine Eliot, 10th Earl of St Germans and Lady Jacquetta Eliot, Countess of St Germans, Antenor Patiño, Annette Reed, Oscar de la Renta and Françoise de Langlade, Desmond Guinness and Princess Henriette Marie-Gabrielle von Urach, Andy Warhol, Nancy Lancaster, Yves Saint Laurent, Doris Duke, Emilio Pucci, Cy Twombly, Billy Baldwin, Jacqueline Kennedy Onassis, Amanda Burden, Paloma Picasso and Comtesse Jacqueline de Ribes. The articles were written by the photographer's longtime companion, Valentine Lawford, a former English diplomat. From this point until nearly the time of his death, Horst spent most of his time traveling and taking photographs. In the mid-1970s, he began working for House & Garden magazine as well as for Vogue.

Horst's last photograph for British Vogue was in 1991 with Princess Michael of Kent, shown against a background of tapestry and wearing a tiara belonging to her mother-in-law, Princess Marina, whom he had photographed in 1934. He died at his home in Palm Beach Gardens, Florida at 93 years of age.

== Publications ==
Books featuring Horst's photography:

- 1944 Horst Photographs of a Decade, J.J. Augustin
- 1946 Patterns from Nature - a collection of plant still lifes, J.J. Augustin
- 1968 Vogue's Book of Houses, Gardens, People, Viking Press
- 1984 Horst, His Work and His World, Alfred A. Knopf
- 1984 Horst Return Engagement: Faces to Remember, Then and Now, Crown Publishers
- 1971 Salute to the Thirties (A Studio Book)
- 1991 Horst - Sixty Years of Photography, Schirmer/Mosel
- 1992 Form/ Horst, Twin Palms
- 1993 Horst: Interiors, Little, Brown and Co
- 1997 Horst P Horst: Magician of Lights
- 2001 Horst Portraits : 60 Years of Style, National Portrait Gallery, London
- 2006 Platinum, Jefferies Cowan
- 2014 "Horst: Photographer of Style", Victoria & Albert Museum, London
- Spezial Fotografie: Portfolio No. 24
