= Merillat =

Merillat may refer to:

- Merillat Airport, Tecumseh, Lenawee County, Michigan, U.S.
- Merillat Industries, an American manufacturer of kitchen cabinets

== People with the surname ==
- Orville D. Merillat
- Richard Merillat
