= William Rondina =

American designer

- Education: University of Washington; Sorbonne University; Parsons School of Design
- Occupation(s): Fashion designer, businessman

William Rondina is an American designer as well as the Founder, CEO and Chairman of The Connaught Group, Ltd and William Rondina, Inc. in New York City. The Connaught Group is Rondina's New York City-based fashion and design parent company to women's fashion lines including Carlisle Collection, Per Se and the affiliated brand, Etcetera.

Rondina is a philanthropist and art collector.

== Early life and education ==
He grew up in the suburbs of Seattle. He attended the University of Washington and studied at the Sorbonne in Paris and the Parsons School of Design. His first job was as a design assistant at the Seventh Avenue firm of Ben Zuckerman.

== Career ==
In 2013, Rondina started a new specialty knitwear company, Rondina New York.

== Memberships and leadership ==
Rondina is a member of the Carnegie Hall Board of Trustees and the New York Botanical Garden Board of Directors.

His New York corporate offices and his country home were designed by Robert Denning of Denning & Fourcade.
