= Xavier Fourcade =

French American art dealer

Xavier Fourcade (September 20, 1926 – April 28, 1987) was a French American contemporary art dealer and proprietor of the Xavier Fourcade Gallery in Manhattan.

Fourcade was born in Paris, the son of Jean Fourcade, a banker, and his wife, Christiane. He attended the Oratorian school of St. Martin in Pontoise, going on to study at the Ecole des Sciences Politiques and the Ecole des Langues Orientales in Paris, although he did not graduate.

He moved to the United States in 1955 and joined Knoedler & Company in 1966. He started Xavier Fourcade, Inc. in 1970 and became a dealer in contemporary art. Xavier Fourcade represented Willem de Kooning, Joan Mitchell, Raoul Hague, Malcolm Morley, Kevin Moss, John Chamberlain, Michael Heizer, Jan Henle, Walter De Maria, Dorothea Rockburne, Catherine Murphy, Tony Berlant, William Crozier and Magdalena Abakanowicz. Fourcade was entrusted with the estates of Barnett Newman, Arshile Gorky, Tony Smith (shared with the Paula Cooper Gallery), Eva Hesse, and H. C. Westermann.

In 1982, Fourcade became an American citizen. He was diagnosed with AIDS in 1986, and he subsequently returned to France to undergo treatment. Fourcade and Mitchell visited Lille in December 1986 to view an exhibition of works by Henri Matisse from State Hermitage Museum, Leningrad. The trip resulted in the Lille cycle of paintings, followed posthumously by the Chord paintings. Fourcade died on April 28, 1987, in New York City at St. Luke's-Roosevelt Hospital Center.

His brother, Vincent Fourcade was also known internationally as an interior designer and partner in the firm of Denning & Fourcade.
