= Kenneth Jay Lane =

American costume jewelry designer (1932–2017)

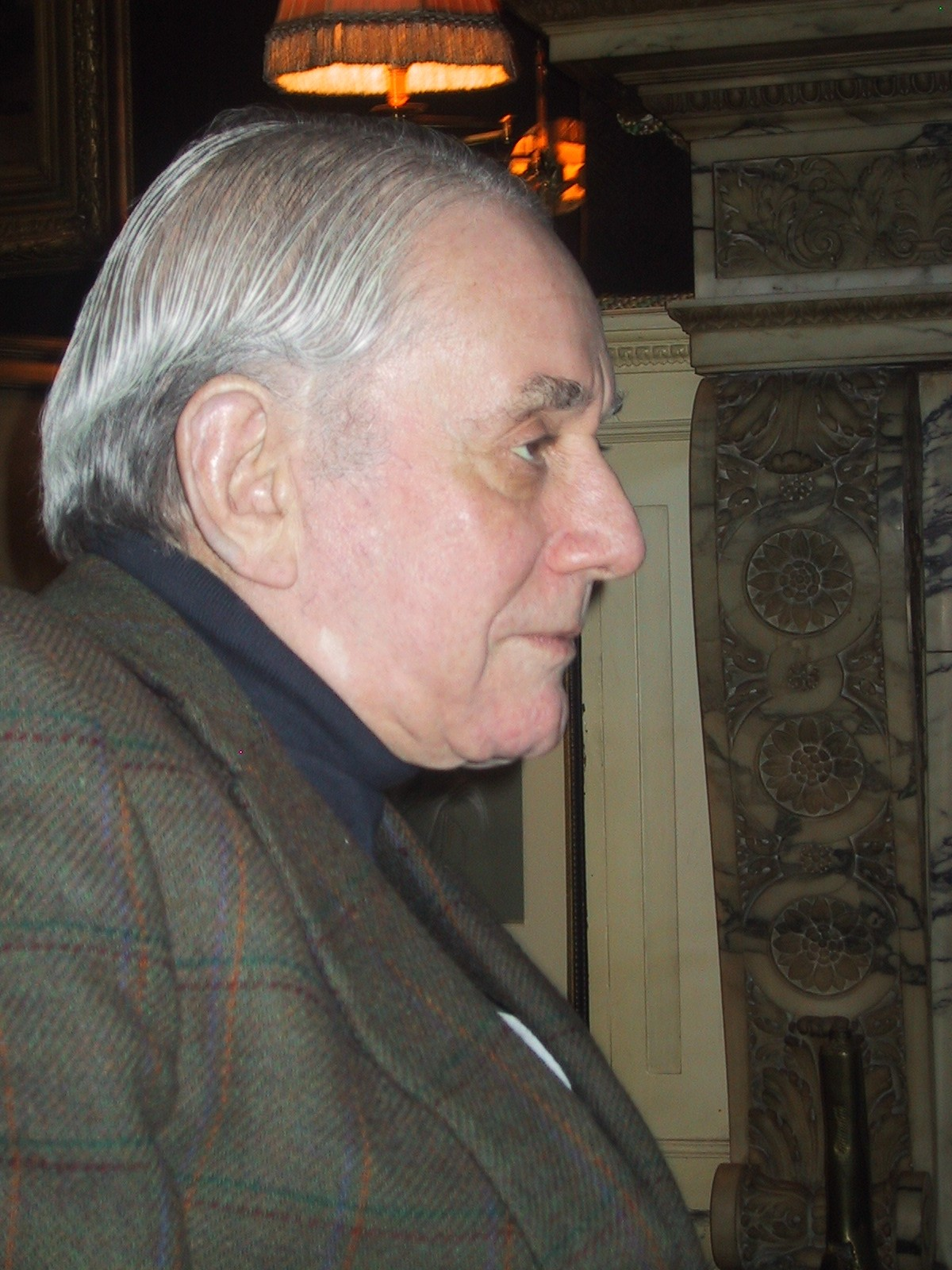
- Kenneth Jay Lane in his apartment in New York City, 2003
- Born: April 22, 1932; Detroit, Michigan, US
- Died: July 20, 2017 (aged 85); New York City, US
- Education: University of Michigan
- Occupation: Jewelry designer
- Spouse: Nicola Weymouth (divorced)

Kenneth Jay Lane (April 22, 1932 – July 20, 2017) was an American costume jewelry designer.

== Life ==
Born in Detroit, Michigan, Lane was the son of an automotive parts supplier. He is of Jewish descent. Lane attended the University of Michigan and the Rhode Island School of Design.

Lane was a member of the New York art staff on Vogue, before going on to design footwear for Delman Shoes between 1956–58 and for the New York branch of Christian Dior from 1958–63, where he trained under Roger Vivier.

Lane was one of the subjects of Andy Warhol's Screen Tests (where, in a film taken in 1966, he represented "high fashion").

From 1977 until his death his home in Manhattan was a duplex in the Stanford White mansion completed in 1892 and one of the few surviving mansions on Park Avenue. From 1923-77, it served as the home of the Advertising Club. At that time, it was converted into a cooperative apartment house. His living room is the former club library and features an original marble mantelpiece, original artwork and lamps designed by Robert Denning of Denning & Fourcade.

Lane collected Orientalist paintings and there is a gallery named in his honor at the Metropolitan Museum of Art in tribute to his philanthropy and bequests.

== Jewelry design ==
Lane started designing jewelry and launched his business in 1963 while producing bejeweled footwear for Dior and Arnold Scaasi. He first came to public attention after Jo Hughes, a fashion industry insider, showed some of his designs to Wallis, Duchess of Windsor, who bought several pieces and recommended him to her friends. As both costume jewelry and society reporting were popular at the time, press reports of this incident launched Lane's business. His talent at copying high end jewelry from a quick glimpse proved popular, his clients proudly wearing the faux pieces.

Jacqueline Kennedy was among those who commissioned fake jewels from Lane in order to enable her to wear them more freely while keeping the valuable originals in a safe. Lane’s clientele also included Princess Diana, Nancy Reagan, Princess Margaret, Greta Garbo, Babe Paley, Naty Abascal and Nan Kempner.

Writing for The New York Times at the time of Truman Capote's Black and White Ball in 1966, Marilyn Bender reported that the "most important men in a fashionable woman's life were her hairdresser, her make-up artist and Kenneth Jay Lane." Lane's designs were hugely popular with a fashionable clientele that could have afforded authentic jewels; while stylists used them to complement the fashionable large hairstyles, short skirts and kaftans in fashion photographs.

In 1966, he was awarded a special Coty Award for his jewelry design. He won the Neiman Marcus Fashion Award in 1968. Other awards received in the 1960s include the Tobé Coburn award (1966), the Harper's Bazaar International award (1967), the Maremodo di Capri-Tiberio d'Oro award (1967), and the Swarovski award (1969). In 1990 he won the Brides award.

In addition to his American establishment, Lane had boutiques in London and Paris. He created designs for Elizabeth Taylor, Diana Vreeland, and Audrey Hepburn, among many other high-profile clients. More recently in 2011, Britney Spears and Nicole Richie were seen wearing Lane jewelry. The Duchess of Windsor was rumoured to have been buried wearing one of his belts. Barbara Bush wore one of his three-strand faux pearl necklaces to her husband's inaugural ball.

In 1993, the year Lane commemorated the 30th anniversary of the founding of his business, The New York Times compared him to Coco Chanel for having successfully made faux jewelry chic, noting that unlike Chanel's wealthy clientele, his rather more affordable designs were accessible to a far wider audience. He established a presence as a vendor of jewelry on the cable television home-shopping network QVC, his twice-a-month four-hour appearances in 1997 each taking $1.5 million. In 1998 the FIT Museum held a retrospective exhibition of Lane's jewelry from the 1960s to the late 1990s.

Kenneth Jay Lane's designs continue to attract modern celebrities. Notable figures such as Lady Gaga, Rihanna, Miley Cyrus, and Katy Perry have incorporated Lane's creations into their distinctive styles. Other famous names, including Madonna, Sarah Jessica Parker, Cheryl Cole, Kyle Richards, Michelle Trachtenberg, and Mindy Kaling have also been spotted wearing Lane's jewelry.

== Death ==
Through Andy Warhol he met Nicola Weymouth, an English socialite who became his wife in 1974. They divorced in 1977. Kenneth Lane died in 2017, aged 85. No known immediate family members survive.

== Legacy ==
Kenneth Jay Lane was a member of London's swinging set who achieved a small piece of cultural immortality as the subject of a portrait by Warhol.
