= Denning & Fourcade, Inc. =

Interior design firm

- Type: corporation
- Genre: design
- Founded: 1960
- Founder: Robert Denning and Vincent Fourcade
- Defunct: 2006
- Headquarters: New York City, United States; Paris
- Products: custom designed furniture
- Services: interior design

Robert Denning & Vincent Fourcade, Inc. (1960 – 2006) was an interior design firm which for over forty years was a leader in the creation of opulent interiors with offices in New York City and Paris. They were known for their "Proust-must-have-slept-here settings for a clientele with anything but American tastes."

== History ==
The company was founded in 1960 by American Jewish designer Robert Denning, a protégé of Mexican-born designer Edgar de Evia, and French designer Vincent Fourcade, a son of the French banking family, who had grown up with the Rothschilds. Their first clients were Lillian Bostwick and Ogden Phipps whom they entertained, together with others from New York society, in the opulent Rhinelander Mansion, which Denning shared with deEvia. Their work was featured through the years in most major interior and fashion magazines including Architectural Digest, Arts & Decoration, House & Garden, and Town & Country. The home which they decorated for Henry Kravis was parodied in the 1990 US movie The Bonfire of the Vanities.

The firm created "decorator rooms" for leading department stores, Tiffany's, Decoration and Design, 1961 exhibition, where they featured wall-to-wall carpet and cushions of real raccoon against walls and upholstery in silk Fortuny and at historic homes. At Old Westbury Gardens on Long Island, the old Phipps estate, they in 1963 created one of the most opulent areas with their design for a Yachtswoman's poolside boudoir. "A lot of our earliest clients—like Michel David-Weill—were people Vincent had gone to parties with. It was a little like, 'let's put on a show'".

They also provided complete temporary makeovers for large parties in clients' apartments, putting the usual furnishings in storage, creating a unique effect with fabrics, potted flowers, plants and trees and hired gilt chairs. At one such party Gloria Vanderbilt Lumet learned to twist. Mrs. John F. Kennedy had the team design a party just before they designed the ninth annual Opera Ball for more than 1,000 persons in the Smithsonian Institution's Museum of History and Technology. They also hosted parties themselves, entertaining the likes of Diana Vreeland, the Kennedys, Horst, the Norman Mailers, Isabel (Nash) and Fred Eberstadt, Eliane David-Weill, Gerry Stutz, and anyone that got past the sentry of Fourcade's list.

The firm has been known for its extensive architectural changes to existing structures, as in the partners' residence in the Lombardy Hotel in Manhattan, where ceilings and walls are torn out to the structural foundations and then new and elaborate columns, panels, and moldings are used for base resurfacing before the application of fabrics and polychrome. Their work with new homes, from ocean front to city penthouses have also created unique spaces for clients which transport one to other cultures and centuries.

The designers have applied their skills to commercial applications, such as the lobby at the Lombardy Hotel in 1996 and Etoile Restaurant which is located in the hotel several years earlier. Here Denning used his signature arm lamps with fringed shades and numerous reproduction paintings made from his own originals, housed in his apartments in Manhattan and Paris. The restaurant today is known as Table 12 and retains the earlier decorating. Denning also decorated the offices for the Carlisle Collection in New York City, which was founded by another client, William Rondina.

Clients include Countess Rattazzi, for whom Denning did homes in Manhattan, South America and Italy (15 houses in all), Henry Kravis, Charles and Jayne Wrightsman, Henry Kissinger, Oscar de la Renta, Jean Vanderbilt, the Ogden Phipps family, Phyllis Cerf Wagner, Lynette and Richard Merillat, Marlene and Spencer Hays, and Henry P. McIlhenny. Two of their clients have collections named for them at the Metropolitan Museum of Art: The Wrightsman Galleries and The Henry R. Kravis Wing. In the case of the Wrightsman Wing, these include works and objects originally procured by the firm for the Wrightsman home.

The firm participated in charity benefits such as the auction to benefit Friends In Deed, a counseling organization for people with AIDS and cancer, and they decorated the main foyer of the von Stade mansion to benefit Southampton's Rogers Memorial Library.

Referred to in New York magazine as "...the Odd Couple. Boyish, down-to-earth Denning is the hardest worker, while Fourcade sniffs the client air to gauge if it's socially registered before he goes beyond the fringe." Fourcade died of AIDS in 1992 and the firm was dissolved after Denning's death on August 26, 2005.
