= Paul Perquer =

French sailor

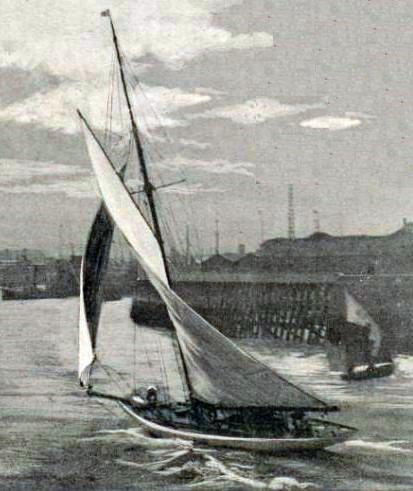
- L'Estérel, crewed by Émile Billard and Paul Perquer in 1900

Personal information
- Full name: Paul Eugène Célestin Perquer
- Born: 3 October 1859 Le Havre, Second French Empire
- Died: 7 January 1914 (aged 54) Barneville-la-Bertran

Sailing career
- Sport: Sailing
- Class: 10 to 20 ton
Medal record
Sailing
Representing France
Olympic Games
Gold medal – first place	1900 Paris	10 to 20 ton

Paul Eugène Célestin Perquer (3 October 1859 in Le Havre – 7 January 1914 in Barneville-la-Bertran) was a French sailor who competed in the 1900 Summer Olympics in Paris, France. Perquer took the gold in the 10 to 20 ton.
