= Élie, Duke of Decazes =

French statesman (1780–1860)

Élie Decazes
- Portrait by François Gérard

Prime Minister of France
- In office 19 November 1819 – 20 February 1820
- Monarch: Louis XVIII
- Preceded by: Jean-Joseph Dessolles
- Succeeded by: Armand Emmanuel du Plessis de Richelieu

Minister of the Interior
- In office 29 December 1818 – 20 February 1820
- Prime Minister: Jean-Joseph Dessolles
- Preceded by: Joseph Lainé
- Succeeded by: Joseph Jérôme Siméon

Minister of Police
- In office 26 September 1815 – 29 December 1818
- Prime Minister: Armand-Emmanuel du Plessis de Richelieu
- Preceded by: Joseph Fouché
- Succeeded by: Office abolished (merged into the Interior Ministry)

Member of the Chamber of Deputies for Seine
- In office 25 August 1815 – 4 October 1816
- Preceded by: Antoine Isaac de Sacy
- Succeeded by: Casimir Périer
- Constituency: Paris

Prefect of Police of Paris
- In office 9 July 1815 – 29 September 1815
- Appointed by: Louis XVIII
- Preceded by: Eustache-Marie Courtin
- Succeeded by: Jules Anglès

Personal details
- Born: 28 September 1780 Saint-Martin-de-Laye, Guyenne, France
- Died: 24 October 1860 (aged 80) Paris, Seine, France
- Party: Doctrinaires
- Spouses: Elisabeth-Fortunée Muraire (m. 1805; died 1806) Wilhelmine de Saint-Aulaire (m. 1818)
- Children: Louis; Frédéric; Henriette
- Education: Military School of Vendôme
- Profession: Statesman

Élie, 1st Duke of Decazes and Glücksbierg, born Élie Louis Decazes (French: [eli lwi dəkaz]; 28 September 1780 – 24 October 1860), was a French statesman, leader of the liberal Doctrinaires party during the Bourbon Restoration.

== Early life and family ==
Coat of arms of Decazes

Élie Decazes was born at Saint-Martin-de-Laye, Gironde, son of Michel Decazes (1747–1832) by his wife, whom he married in 1779, Catherine Trigant de Beaumont. He studied law, became a judge of the Seine Tribunal in 1806, was appointed to the Cabinet of Louis Bonaparte in 1807, and later counsel to the Court of Appeal at Paris in 1811.

On 1 August 1805, in Paris, Decazes married Elisabeth-Fortunée, second daughter of Count Honoré Muraire. She died in Paris on 24 January 1806 without issue.

Decazes married secondly on 11 August 1818 Wilhelmine-Egidia-Octavie de Beaupoil, comtesse de St-Aulaire-Glücksbierg, who died at Versailles on 8 August 1873. By her, he had Louis-Charles-Élie-Amanien (1819–86), the 2nd Duke and later French Foreign Minister, Frédéric-Xavier-Stanislas Decazes (1823 – Paris, 26 February 1887), an author who died unmarried without issue, and Henriette-Guillermine-Eugénie Decazes de Glücksbierg (23 November 1824 – Tournai, November, 1899), who married on 19 April 1845 a Belgian, Léopold-Jacques-Alphonse, Baron Lefebvre.

His younger brother Joseph Decazes (1783–1868), created 1st vicomte Decazes, married in 1816 Diane de Bancalis de Maurel d'Aragon, leaving issue: Sophie Decazes (1817–1904), married in 1835 to François de Carbonnel de Canisy; and Élie Decazes (1822–1851), married in 1850 to Elisabeth de Mauvise de Villars, parents of Raymond Decazes (1851–1913), married in 1887 to Marie-Louise Koechlin (having seven children).

A great-granddaughter, Marguerite-Séverine-Philippine Decazes (widow of Prince Jean-Pierre de Broglie), married as her second husband Captain The Hon. Reginald Fellowes JP (1884–1953), son of Lord de Ramsey.

The 6th and present duke, Louis-Frédéric Decazes, born in 1946, is a wine producer and Chevalier du Tastevin.

== Royalist ==
Immediately after the fall of the Empire, Decazes declared himself a Royalist, and remained faithful to the Bourbons throughout the Hundred Days. He met King Louis XVIII during that period, through Baron Louis, and Louis XVIII rewarded his loyalty by appointing him as Prefect of Police for Paris on 9 July 1815. His marked success in that difficult position earned him appointment as Minister of Police, succeeding Fouché, on 24 September.

Meanwhile, he had been elected Deputy for the Seine (August 1815), and both as Deputy and as a Minister he was a key player among moderate Royalists. His plan was "to royalize France and to nationalize the monarchy." The Moderates were a minority in the Chamber of 1815, so Decazes persuaded Louis XVIII to dissolve Parliament, and accordingly the elections of October 1816 returned them with a majority. During the next four years, Decazes was called upon to play a leading role in the French government.

Decazes was Minister of the Interior from 18 December 1818 to 20 February 1820. The government decided to revive the Exposition des produits de l'industrie française of French industry. A royal ordinance of 13 January 1819 decreed a series of expositions at intervals of no more than four years, with the first to be held in 1819 and the second in 1821. Decazes sent directives to all the prefects in France giving the general conditions for products that would be acceptable for the exposition.

== Minister of Police ==
As Minister of Police, he was required to suppress the insurrections provoked by the Ultra-royalists (the White Terror); after the resignation of the 5th Duc de Richelieu, he took over the day-to-day running of the ministry, although General Dessolles remained as nominal head. Decazes simultaneously held the Interior Ministry portfolio. The Cabinet, in which Baron Louis was Finance Minister, and Marshal de Gouvion Saint-Cyr remained Minister of War, was entirely Liberal in composition; and its first move was to abolish the Ministry of Police, as Decazes felt it incompatible with a régime espousing liberty. His reforms met with the strong hostility of the Chamber of Peers, where the ultra-Royalists held a majority, and to overcome their numerical advantage, he persuaded the King to create sixty new Liberal peers.

Decazes then pushed through legislation about the press, repealing censorship laws. He supported a policy of industrial protection the carrying out of great public works; in that time France gained economic prosperity or expansion after a downturn, and the government increased in popularity. But the powers of the Grand Alliance had been watching the growth of Liberalism in France with increasing anxiety. In particular, Metternich ascribed this mainly to the "weakness" of the Government, and the political election results of 1819 further illustrated this trend, notably by the election of the famous Abbé Henri Grégoire. A debate started over whether the time had not come to put in force the terms of the secret Congress of Aix-la-Chapelle. It was this threat of foreign intervention, rather than the clamour of the "Ultras," which forced Louis XVIII to urge a change in electoral law to prevent such a "scandal" as Grégoire's election in the future.

== Prime minister ==
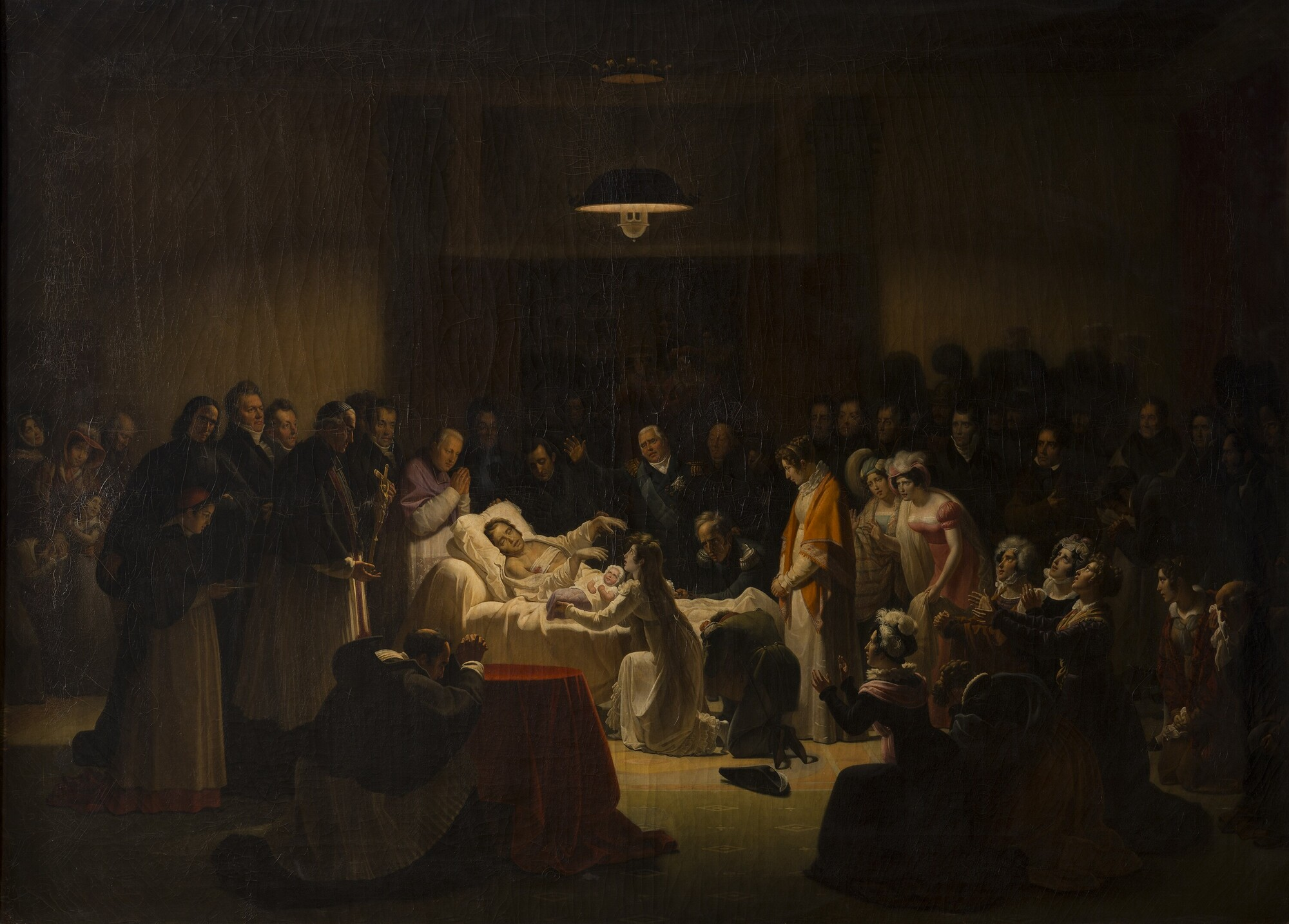
The Death of the Duke of Berry by Alexandre Menjaud. The February 1820 assassination led to an Ultra-Royalist backlash and Decazes was replaced as Prime Minister by the Duke of Richelieu.

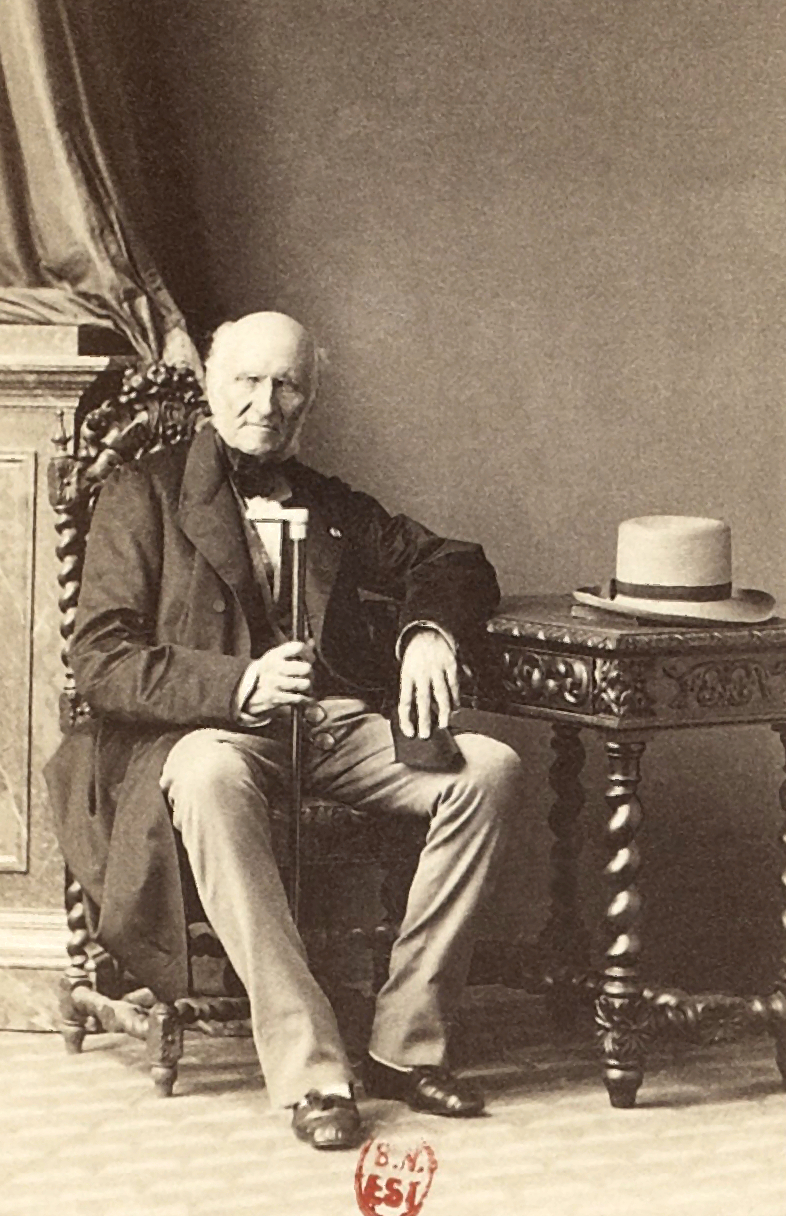
Decazes in 1859, by Disdéri

General Dessolles and Baron Louis, refusing to embark on this policy, then resigned; thus Decazes became the new head of government, as president of the council (November 1819). The exclusion of Grégoire from the chamber and the changes in the franchise embittered the radicals also without reconciling the "Ultras." The news of the revolution in Spain in January 1820 compounded matters, as the royal favourite was accused by his opponents to have begun another revolution; and when, on 13 February, Charles Ferdinand, Duke of Berry, the only member of the royal family expected to ensure royal succession, was assassinated; he was accused of being an accomplice in the crime. Decazes, foreseeing the storm, at once offered his resignation to the King. Louis at first refused. "They will attack", he proclaimed, "not your system, my dear son, but mine"; but in the end, he was forced to yield to the importunity of his family (17 February). Decazes, raised to the rank of duke, passed into honourable exile, being posted as Ambassador to Britain.

This ended Decazes' ministerial career. In December 1821, he returned to sit in the House of Peers, where he continued to voice his Liberal opinions. After 1830, he adhered to the July Monarchy, but after 1848, he remained firmly in retirement.

In 1826, Decazes formed an association to represent the coal and iron industries in Aveyron. The name of Decazeville was given to the industry's regional centre in 1829.

== Honours ==
- Duke of Decazes (French title), 1820
- Duke of Glücksbierg (Danish title), 1818
- Chevalier, Ordre du Saint-Esprit
- Grand-croix, Légion d'honneur
- Knight, Order of the Elephant

== See also ==
- Duke of Decazes
- List of Ambassadors of France to the United Kingdom

Political offices
| Preceded by Marquis Dessolles | Prime Minister of France; 1819–1820 | Succeeded by Duc de Richelieu |
French nobility
| Preceded by Created | Duke of Decazes; 1820–1860 | Succeeded by Louis-Charles-Élie-Amanien |
