= Louis, duc Decazes =

French diplomat and statesman

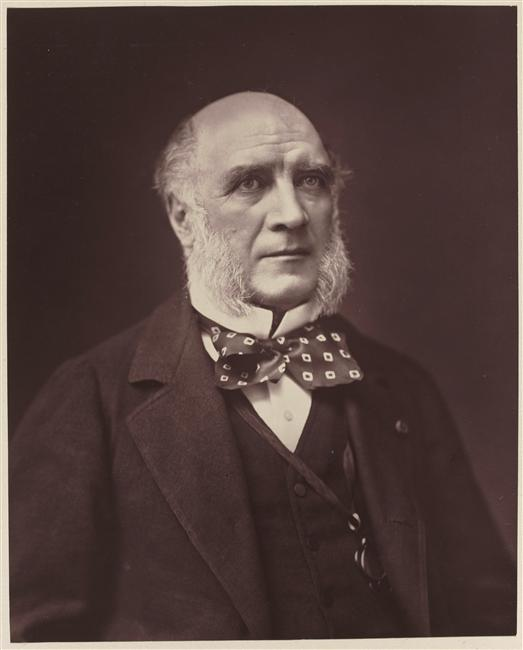

Louis-Charles-Élie-Amanien Decazes de Glücksbierg, 2nd Duke Decazes and 2nd Duke of Glücksbierg (29 May 1819 – 16 September 1886), was a French diplomat and statesman.

== Biography ==
Louis Decazes was born in Paris, the son of Élie, duc Decazes and his second wife, Wilhelmine de Beaupoil de Saint-Aulaire.

He married, on 3 August 1863, Séverine-Rosalie von Löwenthal (8 January 1845, Vienna - 25 September 1911, La Grave), daughter of Jean, baron von Löwenthal. They had two children, Jean-Élie-Octave-Louis-Sévère-Amanien and Wilhelmine-Egidia-Octavie Decazes.

Between 29 November 1873 and 23 November 1877, Duke Decazes served as Minister of Foreign Affairs in several monarchist governments of the Third Republic in the 1870s. In this role, he was responsible for conducting French foreign policy during the "War in Sight" crisis of 1875, when he managed to secure the support of all the other powers in protecting France from a potential German pre-emptive strike, and during the early stages of the Great Eastern Crisis.

The 2nd Duke Decazes died at Château La Grave.

== Honours ==
- Grand officier, Légion d'honneur (1876)
- Grand cross, Order of Saint-Charles (20 March 1877)

== See also ==
- List of Ambassadors of France to the United Kingdom

== Notes ==
Political offices
Preceded by Duc de Broglie	Minister of Foreign Affairs; 1873–1877	Succeeded by Marquis de Banneville
French nobility
Preceded by Élie, duc Decazes	Duke of Decazes; 1860–1886	Succeeded by Jean-Élie-Octave, duc Decazes
