= Salusbury Mellor =

British sailor

Personal information
- Full name: Salusbury Manners Mellor
- Nickname: Pip
- Nationality: British
- Born: 16 September 1862 Cardington, Bedford England
- Died: 26 June 1917 (aged 54) St Helens, Isle of Wight, England

Sailing career
- Sport: Sailing
- Class: 10 to 20 ton

Salusbury Manners Mellor (16 September 1862 – 26 June 1917) was a British sailor who competed in the 1900 Summer Olympics in Paris, France. Mellor took the 5th place in the 10 to 20 ton.
