= Huntington University (United States) =

University in Huntington, Indiana, U.S.

Coordinates: 40°53′51″N 85°29′45″W

- Former names: Central College (1897–1917); Huntington College (1917–2005)
- Motto: The truth will make you free
- Type: Private university
- Established: 1897
- Religious affiliation: Church of the United Brethren in Christ
- Academic affiliations: Council for Christian Colleges & Universities
- President: Robert Pepper
- Students: 1,402
- Location: Huntington, Indiana, United States
- Campus: 160 acres (65 ha); Rural
- Colors: Forest Green, White & Black
- Nickname: Foresters
- Sporting affiliations: NAIA – Crossroads; NCCAA Division I – Midwest
- Website: www.huntington.edu

Huntington University is a private Christian university in Huntington, Indiana, United States. It is affiliated with the Church of the United Brethren in Christ and a member of the Council for Christian Colleges and Universities (CCCU).

== History ==
Huntington University opened as Central College in 1897 after the General Board of Education of the Church of the United Brethren in Christ proposed a new institution of higher learning in Huntington, Indiana. This came soon after the closure of Hartsville College, the denomination's college in Hartsville, Indiana. United Brethren Bishop Milton Wright, father of Orville and Wilbur Wright, served as professor of theology at Hartsville in 1868–1869 and later presided over the dedication ceremony of Central College on September 21, 1897. Hartsville supplied the initial faculty and students for Central College, which offered a coeducational program for both men and women and attracted international students from Sierra Leone, Japan, and elsewhere.

In its earliest decades, the college developed a curriculum in the liberal arts tradition, with courses leading to the Bachelor of Arts, Bachelor of Science, and Bachelor of Philosophy degrees. Programs in the fields of oratory, music, education, and business were included as well. The college's approach to education was both classical and progressive, as reflected in early endeavors such as a campus performance of Shakespeare's "As You Like It" in 1906, directed by professor of oratory Nellie Binning. Among the first student publications and organizations were the Central Literary Data (later The Huntingtonian), the Philomathean Literary Society, the Zetalethean Literary Society, and the Debating Club, as well as student singing clubs and athletic teams for both sexes. Japanese student Matajeiro Umeeda completed requirements for the college's new master's degree in 1903 with a thesis titled "Confucianism and Christianity."

In addition to its classical program of study, the college staffed courses in the applied sciences, and courses aimed at professional training for teachers and ministers. Botanist Fred A. Loew (1874–1950; A.M. Michigan State; Sc.D. Huntington College) built a herbarium (1903), agricultural research station (1914), and botanical garden (1937) at the college, signaling the institution's commitment to theoretical science as well as the practical application of scientific research. The college and its students also benefitted from the early involvement of Jacob L. Brenn (1896–1967), a Jewish chemist from Poland who started Huntington Laboratories (now Ecolab) in 1919 and served as founding President of the Huntington College Foundation (1938), which provided financial support for the institution. The Brenn family donated a large sum to help build the college's first major science building, Brenn Hall of Science (1963).

Having changed its name to Huntington College in 1917, the institution further clarified its mission as a traditional, four-year liberal arts college in the 1920s. The pre-collegiate Academy was closed and its two-year academic tracks were developed into four-year baccalaureate programs. Furthermore, the college secured state accreditation for its teacher training program. These positive trends were checked by the onset of the Great Depression when enrollment dwindled and funding became scarce. Although the denomination's Board of Education voted to suspend operations in 1932, they ultimately reversed their decision and opened as usual. World War II further challenged student recruitment efforts, with fall enrollment in 1942 bottoming out at 83 students (only 28 men). The G.I. Bill brought increased enrollment in the late 1940s and 1950s, and the administration began to pursue accreditation for the institution as a whole. This was achieved when the North Central Association of Colleges and Schools (now the Higher Learning Commission) conferred accreditation in 1961. Further validation of the quality of Huntington's academic programs arrived in 1971 when the college was admitted to the Associated Colleges of Indiana (now the Independent Colleges of Indiana).

The 1970s was a formative era in the modern history of the college. Future Vice President Dan Quayle of Huntington taught as an adjunct instructor and served on the board of trustees. On campus, Steve Platt led the nation in collegiate scoring for two seasons and eventually set the record for collegiate scoring in the state of Indiana (3,700 points). He was inducted in the Indiana Basketball Hall of Fame in 1996. The careers of Quayle and Platt put Huntington in the national spotlight, and in the 1970s the college received its first gift from Ruth and Orville Merillat, a $1 million donation to help build a new physical education, athletics, and recreation facility. Over the next twenty years, the college benefitted greatly from the philanthropic efforts of the Merillat family as the campus expanded and new buildings appeared to serve a growing student body. Key facilities at Huntington bearing the Merillat family name include the Merillat Complex, the Merillat Centre for the Arts, and the RichLyn Library (named in honor of Lynette and Richard Merillat).

In the 1980s and 1990s the college enjoyed increasing recognition for its academic programs and its Christian liberal arts education. Faculty who earned Huntington College a heightened appreciation for its intellectual rigor included R. William Hasker (1935–; Ph.D. Edinburgh), author of God, Time, and Knowledge (Cornell, 1989) and The Emergent Self (Cornell, 1999) and Paul Michelson (1945–; Ph.D. Indiana), a prolific author and leading expert in the field of southeastern European history. Michelson served as past president of the Society for Romanian Studies and won the Balcescu Prize for History by the Romanian Academy (2000). The college also recruited James O'Donnell (MBA Columbia) to serve as executive-in-residence, and he brought a career's worth of experience in finance at Fidelity and Dreyfus to his courses and mentorship. O'Donnell authored several books on investments, and his essays have been featured in Barron’s, The Wall Street Journal, Fortune, and America.

The institution adopted its current name in 2005, and expanded graduate offerings in occupational therapy (OTD) in 2014 and business (MBA) in 2017 to add to existing master's level programs in counseling, ministry, organizational leadership, and education. This program of expansion also included locating campuses in Fort Wayne for its doctoral program in occupational therapy, and in Peoria, Arizona for its undergraduate film, broadcast media, and animation programs.

On September 30, 2022, two former student-athletes filed suit against the school and its former track coach, claiming the university violated the athletes' Title IX rights and failed to protect them from improper conduct by former coach Nick Johnson. Johnson had been fired in 2020. In March 2023, a grand jury indicted Johnson on charges of sexual battery. On November 20, 2023, a federal judge dismissed the Title IX lawsuit against Huntington University. Twenty-two state law claims were also dismissed in federal court.

== Campus ==
Huntington University is located on a contemporary, lakeside campus in northeast Indiana. The campus comprises 160 acres (65 ha) with grassy areas, trees and Lake Sno-Tip.

Thornhill Nature Preserve is a 77-acre (310,000 m^{2}) nature preserve that provides outdoor educational opportunities through the Reiff Nature Center, ropes course, and various community events.

The Merillat Centre for the Arts is a fine arts center that includes the Robert E. Wilson Gallery, as well as the Huntington University departments of art, music, and theatre.

There are seven residence halls on Huntington's campus. They are Wright, Hardy, Roush, Baker, Miller, Meadows and Livingston Halls. Students can also live in Forester Village, an upperclassmen apartment complex.

The Huntington Union Building (Known informally as the HUB) was recently renovated to create new space for students.

The institution also supports academic programs at the Parkview Hospital Randallia campus in Ft. Wayne, Indiana and at the Huntington University Arizona Center in Peoria, Arizona.

== Organization ==
Huntington University has a "strong historic and ongoing relationship with the Church of the United Brethren in Christ," an evangelical denomination headquartered in Huntington, Indiana.

== Academics ==
Huntington University offers graduate and undergraduate programs in more than 80 academic disciplines.

=== Rankings ===
Huntington University was tied for 22 of 127 in the Regional Universities Midwest category of the 2022–23 Best Colleges ranking by U.S. News & World Report. The university was also ranked 13 of 69 in Best Value Schools.

== Athletics ==
The Huntington athletic teams are called the Foresters. The university is a member of the National Association of Intercollegiate Athletics (NAIA), primarily competing in the Crossroads League (formerly known as the Mid-Central College Conference (MCCC) until after the 2011–12 school year) since the 1959–60 academic year. They are also a member of the National Christian College Athletic Association (NCCAA), primarily competing as an independent in the Midwest Region of the Division I level.

Huntington competes in 18 intercollegiate varsity sports: Men's sports include baseball, basketball, bowling, cross country, golf, soccer, tennis and track & field; while women's sports include basketball, bowling, cross country, soccer, softball, tennis, track & field and volleyball; and co-ed sports include cheerleading.

== Student life ==
Huntington University students have the opportunity to participate in a number of activities and service opportunities throughout the year. The Friesen Center for Volunteer Service provides students with a range of service projects and programs, including local blood drives and short-term mission experiences. Students may also run for office on the Student Government Association. Student Government Association "serves as a liaison between students and faculty/staff/administration, and addresses issues that pertain to the student body."

Huntington University's Student Activities Board, more commonly known as SAB, is a student-led organization responsible for planning and facilitating student events. The board plans and hosts more than a dozen annual events at Huntington University, including hoedowns, mud volleyball, laser tag, movies and concerts. SAB also facilitates Olympiad, a popular four-day event composed of athletic games and challenges.

There are nearly 30 other student organizations available to students at Huntington University, from academic groups and honors societies to interest groups and clubs.
