= Georges Cronier =

French sailor

Personal information
- Full name: Georges A. Cronier
- Nationality: French

Sailing career
- Sport: Sailing
- Class: 10 to 20 ton

Georges A. Cronier was a French sailor who competed in the 1900 Summer Olympics in Paris, France. Cronier took the 4th place in the 10 to 20 ton.
