= Saint-Martin-de-Laye =

- Commune
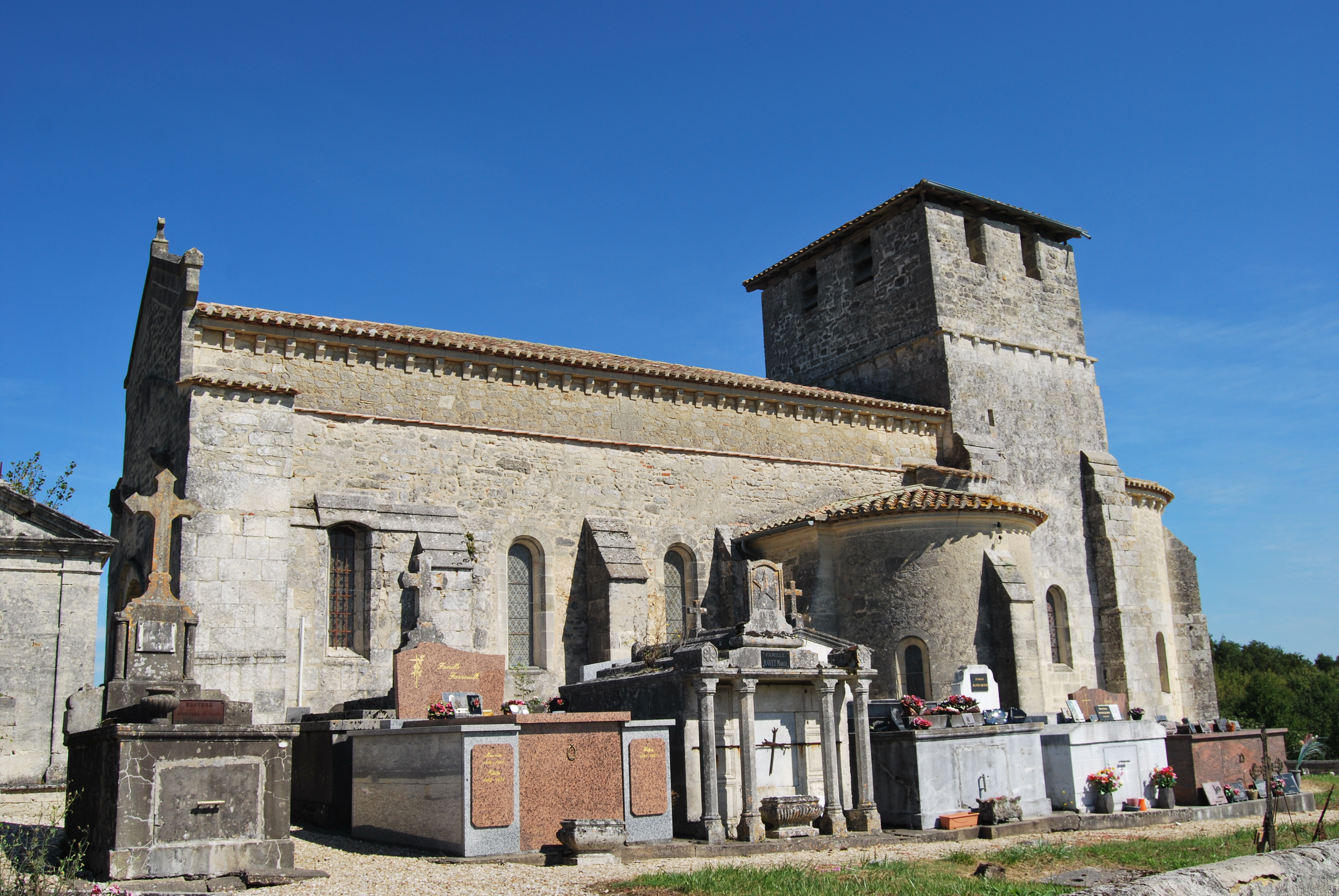
- The church in Saint-Martin-de-Laye
- Location of Saint-Martin-de-Laye
- Location within France Location within Nouvelle-Aquitaine
- Coordinates: 45°02′10″N 0°13′36″W
- Country: France
- Region: Nouvelle-Aquitaine
- Department: Gironde
- Arrondissement: Libourne
- Canton: Le Nord-Libournais
- Intercommunality: CA Libournais

Government
  - Mayor (2020–2026): Christophe Galan
- Area^{1}: 9.56 km^{2} (3.69 sq mi)
- Elevation: 17 m (56 ft)
- Highest elevation: 81 m (266 ft)
- Lowest elevation: 4 m (13 ft)
- Population (2023): 540
  - Density: 56/km^{2} (150/sq mi)
- Time zone: UTC+01:00 (CET)
  - Summer (DST): UTC+02:00 (CEST)
- INSEE/Postal code: 33442 /33910
- ^{1} French Land Register data, which excludes lakes, ponds, glaciers > 1 km^{2} (0.386 sq mi or 247 acres) and river estuaries.

Saint-Martin-de-Laye is a commune in the Gironde department in Nouvelle-Aquitaine in southwestern France. Saint-Martin-de-Laye is also the birthplace of Élie, duc Decazes.

== Population ==
Historical population
Year	Pop.	±% p.a.
1968	263	—
1975	270	+0.38%
1982	361	+4.24%
1990	359	−0.07%
1999	386	+0.81%
2007	461	+2.24%
2012	533	+2.94%
2017	544	+0.41%
2023	540	−0.12%
Source: INSEE

== See also ==
- Communes of the Gironde department
