= Jean, duc Decazes =

French yacht racer

Medal record

Sailing

Representing France

Olympic Games
Silver medal – second place	1900 Paris	10 to 20 ton

Jean Élie Octave Louis Sévère Amanien Decazes de Glücksbierg, 3rd Duc Decazes and 3rd Duke of Glücksbierg (April 30, 1864 – August 31, 1912), was a French aristocrat and sportsman.

== Biography ==
Decazes was born in Paris. On April 28, 1888, still in Paris, he married Isabelle-Blanche Singer (1869–1896), who was the daughter of American sewing-machine millionaire Isaac Singer. They had three children:

- Louis Jean Victor Sévère (1889–1941). Had issue.
- Marguerite Séverine Philippine, best known as Daisy Fellowes (1890–1962). Had issue.
- Jacques Louis Élie Decazes de Glücksbierg (Paris, August 31, 1891 – Beaumont-en-Beine, March 15, 1916), unmarried and without issue.

After the suicide of his wife in 1896 their children were raised in large part by their aunt Winnaretta Singer, Princess Edmond de Polignac.

A member of the Yacht Club de France, Jean Decazes won a silver medal sailing at the 1900 Summer Olympics in the 10 to 20 ton class. The following year he captured the 1901 Coupe de France again using his sailboat Quand-Même II.

He died in Chantilly in 1912 aged 48.

French nobility
Preceded by Louis-Charles-Élie-Amanien	Duke of Decazes; 1886–1912	Succeeded by Louis Jean Victor Sévère
