= Valentine Lawford =

British diplomat

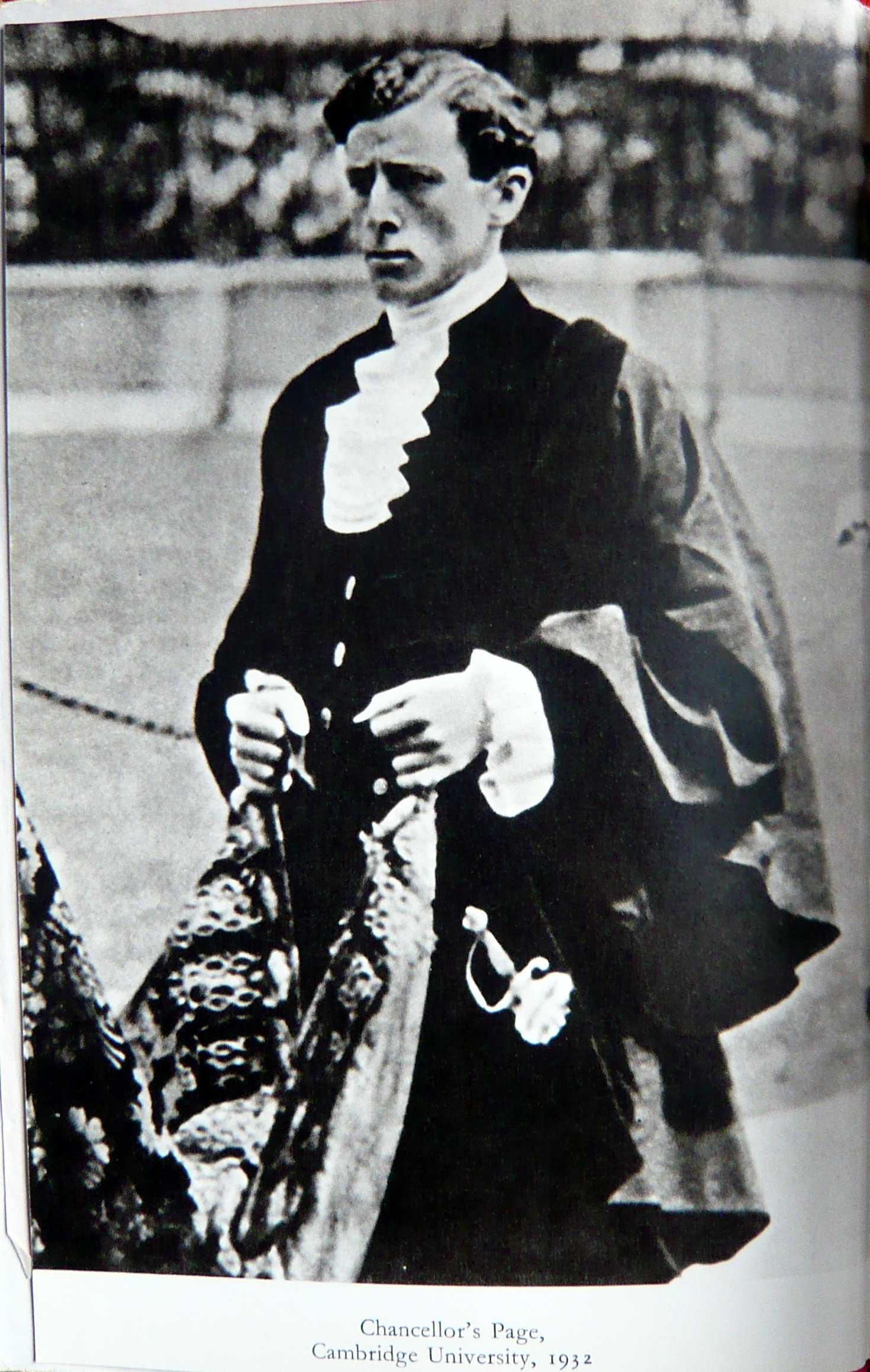
Valentine Lawford as a page to the Chancellor of Cambridge University, 1932

Valentine George Lawford (February 27, 1911 – June 18, 1991) was a British diplomat and long-term partner of German-American fashion photographer Horst P. Horst. He adopted the name Nicholas in Paris in the late 1930s (apparently because Valentine was a girl's name in French)

== Early life ==
Valentine Lawford attended Repton School and Corpus Christi College, Cambridge where he read modern and medieval languages. He undertook further linguistic studies at the Sorbonne, Strasbourg and in Vienna.

== Career ==
Having passed the Diplomatic Service exam, he joined the Foreign Office in London 1934. He served as Third Secretary at the Paris Embassy from 1937 to 1939. From 1939 to 1946 he was the private secretary of Lord Halifax, Anthony Eden and Ernest Bevin, all three of them Secretary of State for Foreign and Commonwealth Affairs.

During World War II he acted as official interpreter at various conferences and war councils, and was the regular interpreter of Winston Churchill.

As part of Britain's delegation, he took part at the Yalta Conference, Moscow Conference (1945) and Quebec Conference (1943).

From 1946 to 1949 he was the alternate British delegate to the United Nations Security Council.

From 1949 to 1950 he was Chargé d'affaires at the British Embassy in Tehran, Iran.

In the 1960s and 1970s Lawford wrote the articles on the lifestyle of international high society illustrated by Horst for Vogue. In 1968 Vogue's Book of Houses, Gardens, People collected most of those articles, Lawford's contribution defined as "lyrical essays". In 2016 Around That Time: Horst at Home in Vogue, featured much of the material of the original book.

Alone he wrote Bound for Diplomacy, his autobiography published in 1963, and Horst, His Work & His World in 1984.

He also painted watercolours which were widely exhibited.

== Personal life ==
In Paris, in the 1930s, Lawford moved in a circle that included: Gertrude Stein, Duff Cooper, Sir Charles Mendl and Elsie de Wolfe, Billy Baldwin, Douglas Fairbanks, the Rothschilds, the de Castellanes, the Windsors, and Nancy Cunard.

Valentine Lawford met Horst in New York in 1946 (they believed their paths may have crossed fleetingly in Paris in 1938), and they remained together until Lawford's death in 1991. They raised an Austrian national, Hans Mayr, as their adopted son. Horst subsequently adopted Richard J. Tardiff (who adopted the surname Horst).

At the time of his death, Lawford was living in Oyster Bay Cove, New York.
