= Sailing at the 1900 Summer Olympics – 10 to 20 ton =

10 to 20 Ton Sailing at the Games of the II Olympiad
- 10 – 20 Ton Class
- Venue: Le Havre
- Date: First race: August 1, 1900; Last race: August 6, 1900
- Competitors: 7 (documented) from 2 nations
- Teams: 6

Medalists
1st place, gold medalist(s)		Émile Billard, Paul Perquer	France
2nd place, silver medalist(s)		Jean Decazes	France
3rd place, bronze medalist(s)		Edward Hore	Great Britain

The 10 to 20 ton was a sailing event on the Sailing at the 1900 Summer Olympics program in Le Havre. Six boats started during the three races in the 10 to 20 ton. Seven sailors are documented. The races were held on 1, 5 and 6 August 1900 on the English Channel.

== Race schedule ==
●	Meulan competition	●	Le Havre competition

1900	May								August					
1900	20 Sun	21 Mon	22 Tue	23 Wed	24 Thu	25 Fri	26 Sat	27 Thu	1 Fri	2 Sat	3 Sun	4 Mon	5 Tue	6 Wed
10 to 20 ton									●				●	●
Total gold medals														1

== Course area and course configuration ==
For the 10 to 20 ton the 22 nautical miles (41 km) course off the coast of Le Havre was used.

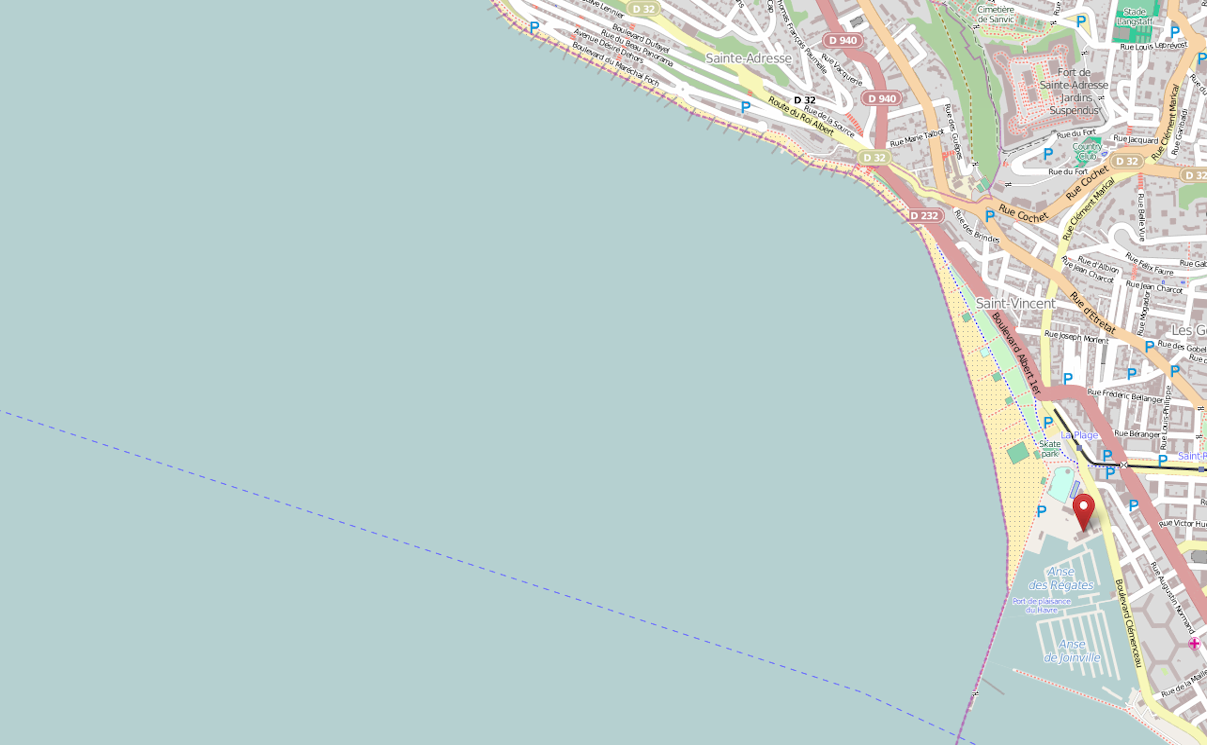
Course area Le Havre

== Weather conditions ==
Date	Race	Description	Sea	Wind direction	Remark
01-AUG-1900	1	Beautiful breeze, freshening in the second round	Choppy	to	
05-AUG-1900	2	very strong breeze with rain. Later gale-force winds	Very rough seas		
06-AUG-1900	3	Wind ranging breath with violence	The sea is more rough	to	

== Final results ==
The 1900 Olympic scoring system was used. Handicaps were added to each boat's actual time to give a total adjusted time. The handicaps only had an effect in the third race.

Rank	Country	Helmsman	Crew	Boat	Race 1		Race 2		Race 3		Total
Rank	Country	Helmsman	Crew	Boat	Pos.	Pts.	Pos.	Pts.	Pos.	Pts.	Total
1st place, gold medalist(s)	France	Émile Billard	Paul Perquer	Estérel	3:18:28 (T); 4:17:12 (C)	10	2:44:37 (T); 3:43:21 (C)	9	2:32:52 (T); 3:22:36 (C)	10	29
2nd place, silver medalist(s)	France	Jean Decazes		Quand-même	3:19:17 (T); 4:18:46 (C)	9	2:46:42 (T); 3:46:11 (C)	8	2:28:40 (T); 3:28:09 (C)	8	25
3rd place, bronze medalist(s)	Great Britain	Edward Hore		Laurea	3:21:34 (T); 4:20:18 (C)	8	2:43:05 (T); 3:41:49 (C)	10	DNF	5	23
4	France	Cronier		Rozenn	3:17:59 (T); PEN	4	2:47:58 (T); 3:47:27 (C)	7	2:27:30 (T); 3:26:59 (C)	9	20
5	Great Britain	Salusbury Mellor		Nan	3:30:34 (T); 4:25:48 (C)	6	2:58:53 (T); 3:53:17 (C)	6	2:40:48 (T); 3:36:02 (C)	7	19
6	France	Jules Valton		Luna	3:23:41 (T); 4:21:37 (C)	7	3:04:47 (T); 4:02:43 (C)	5	2:38:15 (T); 3:36:12 (C)	6	18

Legend: DNF – Did not finish; PEN – Penalty given by the protest committee;
Gender: – male; – female;

== Daily standings ==
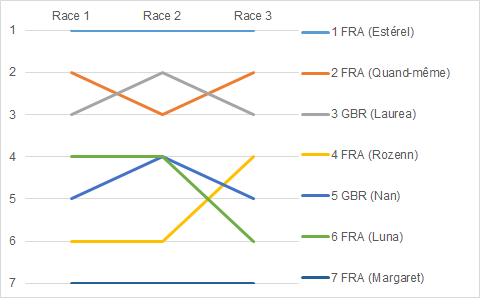
Graph showing the daily standings in the 10 – 20 TON during the 1900 Summer Olympics

== Notes ==
Rozenn was penalized by the jury for touching a buoy in race 1. She was awarded a number of points equal to that he would have obtained arriving last, decreases by one point.

== Other information ==
The races drew a considerable number of spectators and yachts to watch the races in Le Havre. The harbour was packed with different tonnage vessels. Offshore the Fleurus, Cassini, and Mangini destroyers were present. Most of the members of the international jury followed the races aboard the Almee, a yacht owned by Henri Menier.

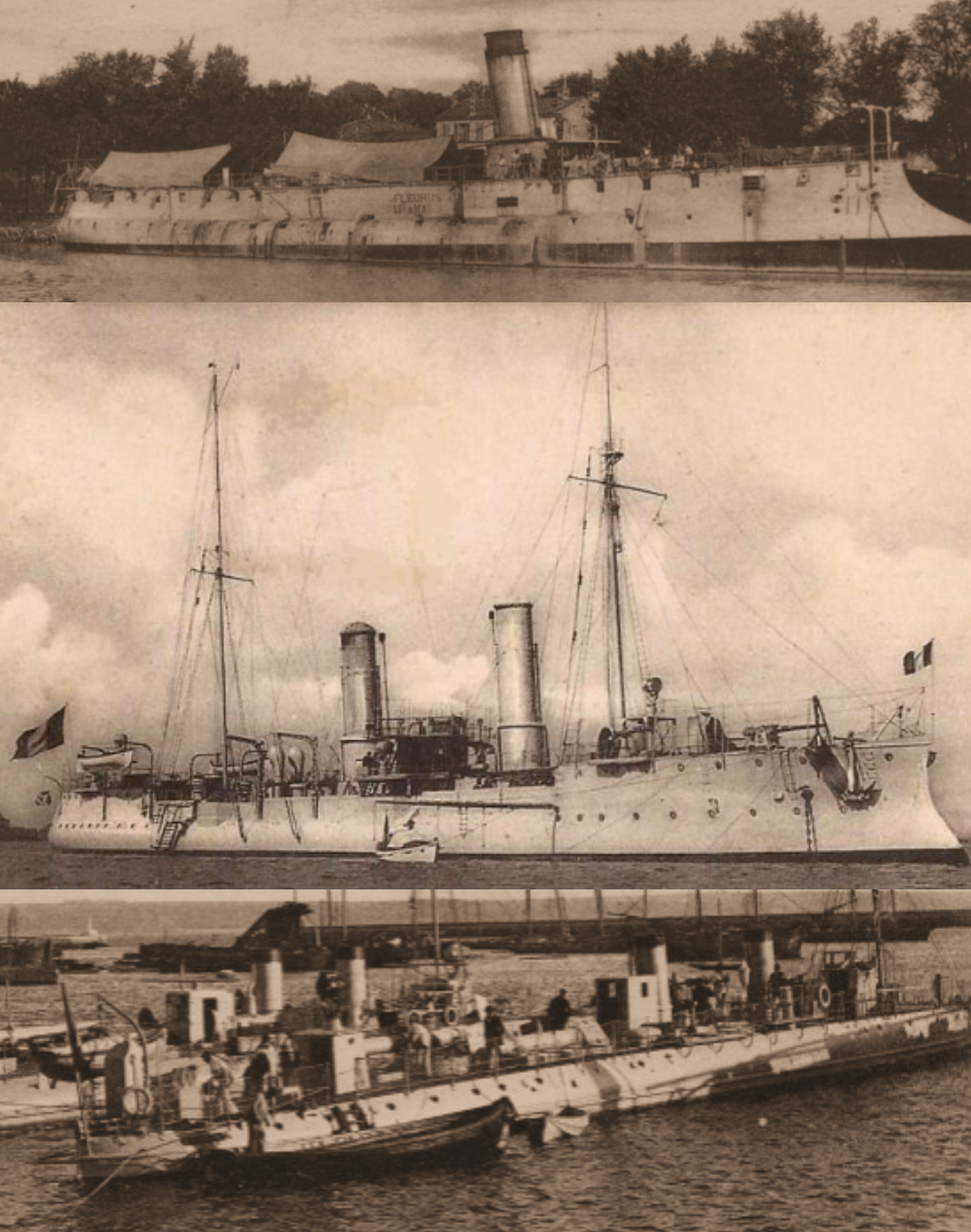
These three French destroyers were present during the sailing of the 1900 Summer Olympics off the coast of Le Havre (FRA).
