= Richard Merillat =

American businessman

Richard Dee Merillat
- Born: June 20, 1946 (age 79); Adrian, Michigan, United States
- Occupations: Entrepreneur, philanthropist
- Known for: President and CEO of Merillat Industries
- Spouse: Lynette S. Merillat
- Children: 3 (Wendy, Collette, and Tricia.)
- Father: Orville D. Merillat

Richard Merillat is an American entrepreneur, philanthropist and the retired President/CEO of Merillat Industries.

== Early life ==
Born in Adrian, Michigan, his parents were Ruth and Orville D. Merillat, founder of Merillat Industries, Inc., which was acquired by the Masco Corporation in 1985.

== Career ==
He worked in the family business from when he was 13 until retirement, eventually becoming vice president of manufacturing and president of Merillat Industries, and continuing as chairman of the board.

== Other positions ==
He was a long-time Mackinac Center for Public Policy supporter and is the president of Christian Family Foundation in Naples, Florida. He has also been associated with the Lenawee Christian School, the Christian Family Centre, Huntington University, Bill Glass Prison Ministries, and the American Bible Society.

== Philanthropy ==
Richard Merillat and his wife Lynette are well-known philanthropists in both Florida and Michigan. They are both involved in society. They maintain homes in both states which were designed by the late Robert Denning of Denning & Fourcade of New York City and Paris. They have three daughters: Wendy, Collette and Tricia.

The Merillat Quarter Horse Farm was widely renowned with AQHA World Champions at Stud. It was donated to Michigan State University in 1996, the largest gift-in-kind received by the university and by the College of Agriculture and Natural Resources at Michigan State University. This included 80 acres (320,000 m^{2}), two premier stallions, 43 quarterhorses, two houses (each 1,500 square feet (140 m^{2}) in size), a 72-by-200 horse barn, a 72-by-100 breeding barn, an 80-by-200 arena, and storage building.

The Merillats created the Merillat Scholars Program at Huntington University in Huntington, Indiana, a program providing financial assistance to students there who are members of the Church of the United Brethren in Christ, student leaders of Youth for Christ, or children of Huntington alumni. He is also on the Board of Trustees of Eckerd College in St. Petersburg, Florida. The college awarded him an honorary Doctor of Commercial Science degree. in 2002.
