= Lombardy Hotel =

Hotel in Manhattan, New York

Coordinates: 40°45′38.5″N 73°58′13.36″W

Lombardy Hotel logo

The Lombardy Hotel is located at 111 East 56th Street (between Park Avenue and Lexington Avenue) in the Midtown East neighborhood of New York City. The building was turned into a co-op in 1957. Built in the 1920s by William Randolph Hearst for his mistress, silent film star Marion Davies, The Lombardy has been the New York residence of film stars like Elizabeth Taylor and Richard Burton, as well as award-winning composer Richard Rodgers.

Interior designer Robert Denning designed the hotel's lobby in the 1990s. The lobby was since renovated, but Robert Denning's personal apartment, where he lived till he died, is still as he designed it with a combined living and dining room, master bedroom suite and a guest bedroom.

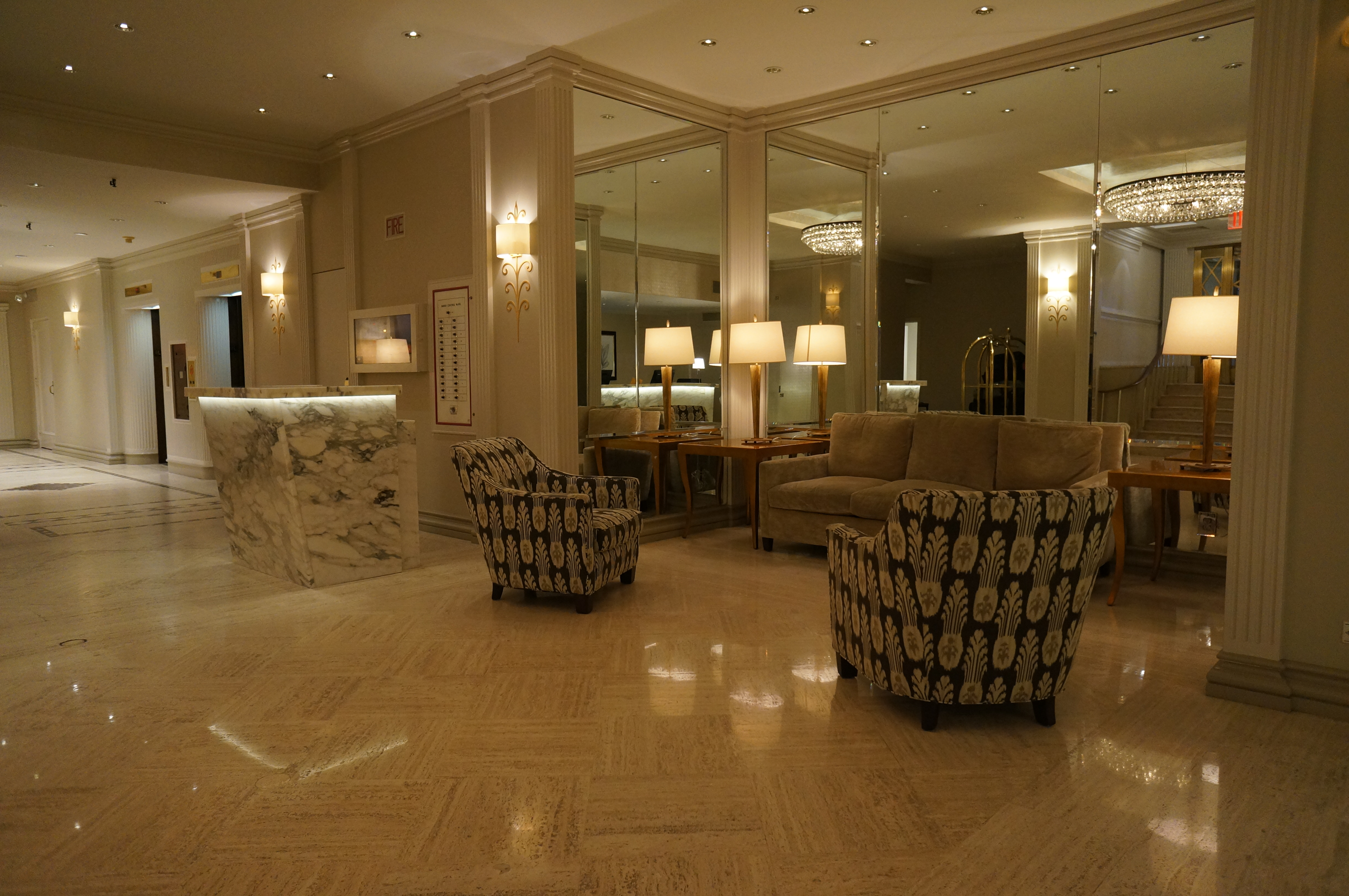
Lobby of the Lombardy Hotel

The hotel lobby was renovated in October 2012 as part of an ongoing restoration. The hallways were renovated in 2015 and units are consistently updated by individual owners.

There are currently 160 studios, one, two and three-bedroom apartments in the hotel rental pool and additional units owned by permanent residents or used solely as second homes. Some apartments are available for sale which may be used as a residence or investment.
