= Orville D. Merillat =

American businessman

Orville D. Merillat (May 1, 1916 – January 15, 1999) was an American businessman and philanthropist, who was the founder of Merillat Industries, Inc., a manufacturer of wooden kitchen cabinets.

He was born on a farm in Tedrow, Ohio, on May 1, 1916, the seventh of the fifteen children of David Merillat (1868-1943) and his wife, née Emma Jane McCallum (1886-1946). Orville quit school in the ninth grade to work on the family farm. In the 1940 Census he was living in Dover Township, Fulton County, Ohio, and his occupation was given as carpenter. He married Ruth Meller on January 19, 1941, and served in the U.S. Coast Guard during World War II.

After the war, he started a cabinet-making business with his wife, and became the co-founder, President and CEO of Merillat Industries, Inc., building the business on the principles set forth in Malachi 3:10. Always a team, he and Ruth eventually employed over 3,000 people with more than eleven factories across the United States. Orville retired when the business was sold in 1985 to the Masco Corporation, and his son then became the President of Merillat Industries.

Orville was the recipient of the Michigan Small Business Person of the Year in 1977, and co-recipient with Ruth of the National Association of Evangelicals' Laypersons of the Year in 1988. He co-founded the Orville and Ruth Merillat Foundation and founded the Christian Family Foundation.

His benefactions included being a major benefactor and contributor to Siena Heights College (now Siena Heights University) in Adrian, Michigan; he was a major contributor to Huntington University in Indiana, and was a major contributor to Adrian College in Adrian, Michigan. Also, Orville was founder and benefactor of Lenawee Christian School and the Christian Family Centre, and was the founder and benefactor of 243-acre (0.98 km^{2}) Michindoh Camp and Conference Center in Hillsdale, Michigan. He donated an obstetrics ward to Narsapur Hospital in India, and donated a wing to Bixby Hospital in Adrian, Michigan.

He received an honorary doctorate degree from Huntington College and was the co-author of his autobiography "His Guiding Hand" published by Coral Ridge Ministries in 1992. Politically, he was a major contributor to the Republican Party.

Orville and Ruth Merillat had one son, Richard Merillat. Richard and his wife Lynette are the parents of three children, Wendy, Collette and Tricia.

Orville D. Merillat died in Adrian on January 15, 1999.
