= Robert Denning =

American interior designer

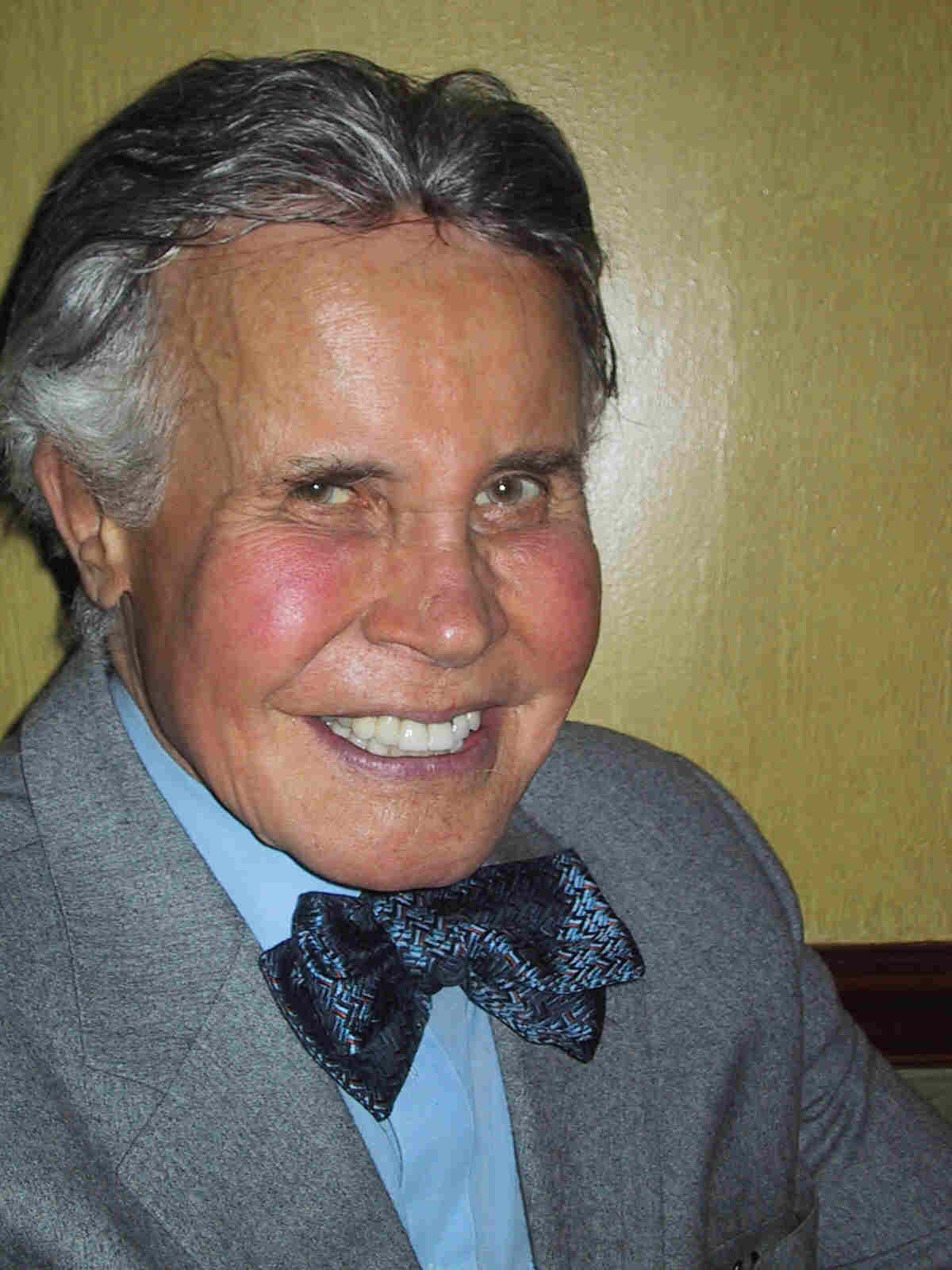
- Denning, c. 2002
- Born: Robert Dennis Besser; March 13, 1927; New York City, U.S.
- Died: August 26, 2005 (aged 78); New York City, U.S.
- Occupations: Interior design Denning & Fourcade, Inc.
- Partners: Edgar de Evia (1942–1959); Vincent Fourcade (1959–1992)

Robert Denning (March 13, 1927 – August 26, 2005) was an American interior designer whose lush interpretations of French Victorian decor became an emblem of corporate raider tastes in the 1980s.

== Early life ==
Denning was born Robert Dennis Besser in New York City, New York, to Jean (née Rosen) and Jacob Besser. Denning, as he was often called, developed an early interest in his body and health, a characteristic instilled in him by his mother. He was just fifteen when he met Edgar de Evia who was the research assistant to Dr. Guy Beckley Stearns and would go on to become a noted photographer. He became a testing subject for this homeopathic medical research and when his parents and younger brother moved to Florida, he stayed in New York City living with de Evia and his mother Miirrha Alhambra. He would often say that he saw his first lampshade in this home, as he grew up with a bare bulb being adequate. His first effort with decorating was perhaps in imitation of Syrie Maugham when he and Edgar painted everything in Miirrha's room white and put her bed on a dais. Her only response was: "Did you have to paint even my Baccarat perfume bottles?" He never used white again.

He was one of several design leaders raised in the Jewish community in the Bronx, along with Calvin Klein and Ralph Lauren.

== Denning & Fourcade ==
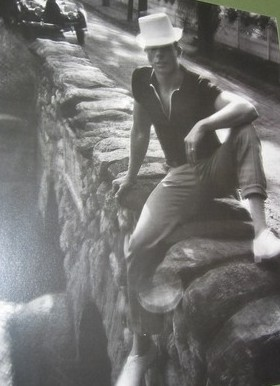
Robert Denning in photograph taken by Edgar de Evia in the 1950s.

Beginning in 1960, the firm of Denning & Fourcade would become known for colorful extravagance and over the top opulence. Clients included Michel David-Weill; the Ogden Phipps family, for whom they did fifteen houses; Henry Kravis, whose home, and their decorating, was parodied in the 1990 movie "The Bonfire of the Vanities"; Charles and Jayne Wrightsman; Henry Kissinger; Diana Ross; Oscar de la Renta both in Manhattan and Connecticut; Beatriz and Antenor Patiño, the Bolivian tin magnate and Jean Vanderbilt. For thirty years they were courted on both sides of the Atlantic. Longtime clients such as Spencer Hays, Lynette and Richard Merillat for whom he has designed homes in Naples, Florida and Michigan, the Countess Rattazzi, for whom he did homes in Manhattan, South America and Italy shopped with him in the wholesale import markets in New York City and the Paris flea markets. Denning's five story townhouse for Phyllis Cerf Wagner is described as: "... cozy and grand at the same time, but not elaborately fussy."

Eugenia Sheppard of the New York Herald Tribune dubbed their work "Le Style Rothschild." It reeked de l'argent. "Outrageous luxury is what our clients want," Denning & Fourcade said. This was the 1980s, the era of instant wealth. They visually defined it, giving crisp money the appearance of provenance and what Denning called "a casual English attitude about grandeur."

Often perceived as "...the Odd Couple. Boyish, down-to-earth Denning is the hardest worker, while Fourcade sniffs the client air to gauge if it's socially registered before he goes beyond the fringe." Jewelry designer Kenneth Jay Lane developed a passion for art pieces from the Middle East which the firm was in the vanguard of introducing and has also used some of their lighting treatments. Denning designed Jason Epstein's SoHo home from scratch in the shell of the building that housed the first consolidated New York police department. This was an entirely new effort for the designer who is known by many to specialize in a period "we'd call early-fringed-lampshade, but chic".

They would also amass a large collection of artwork and bronzes. They would commission original works of art and collect many of the same artists that they would recommend to their clients.

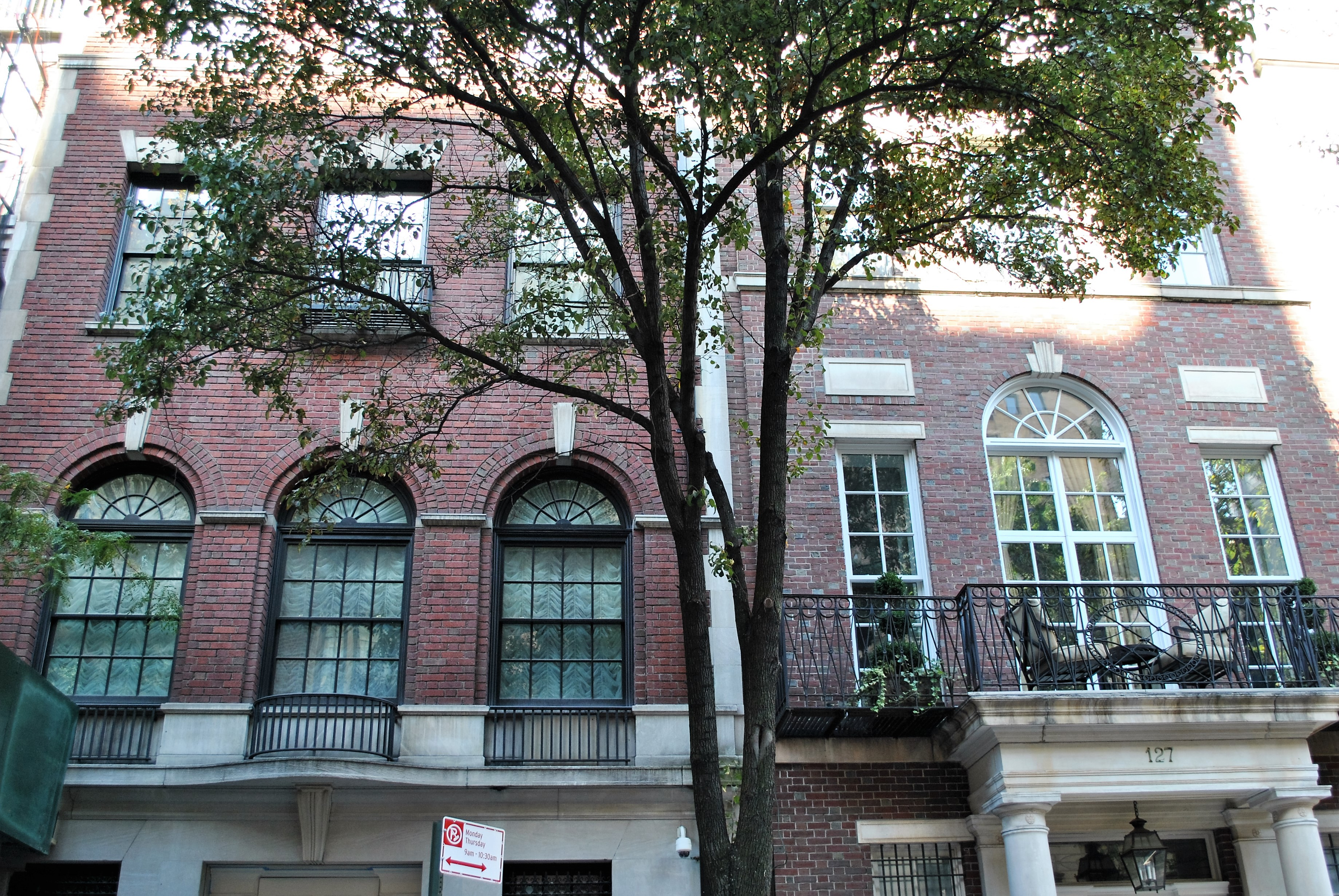
East 73d Street

Fourcade and Denning shared a red brick mansion on East 73d Street in Manhattan and a house they built in Bridgehampton, Long Island; both houses were the subjects of articles in decorating magazines around the world.

== After Fourcade ==
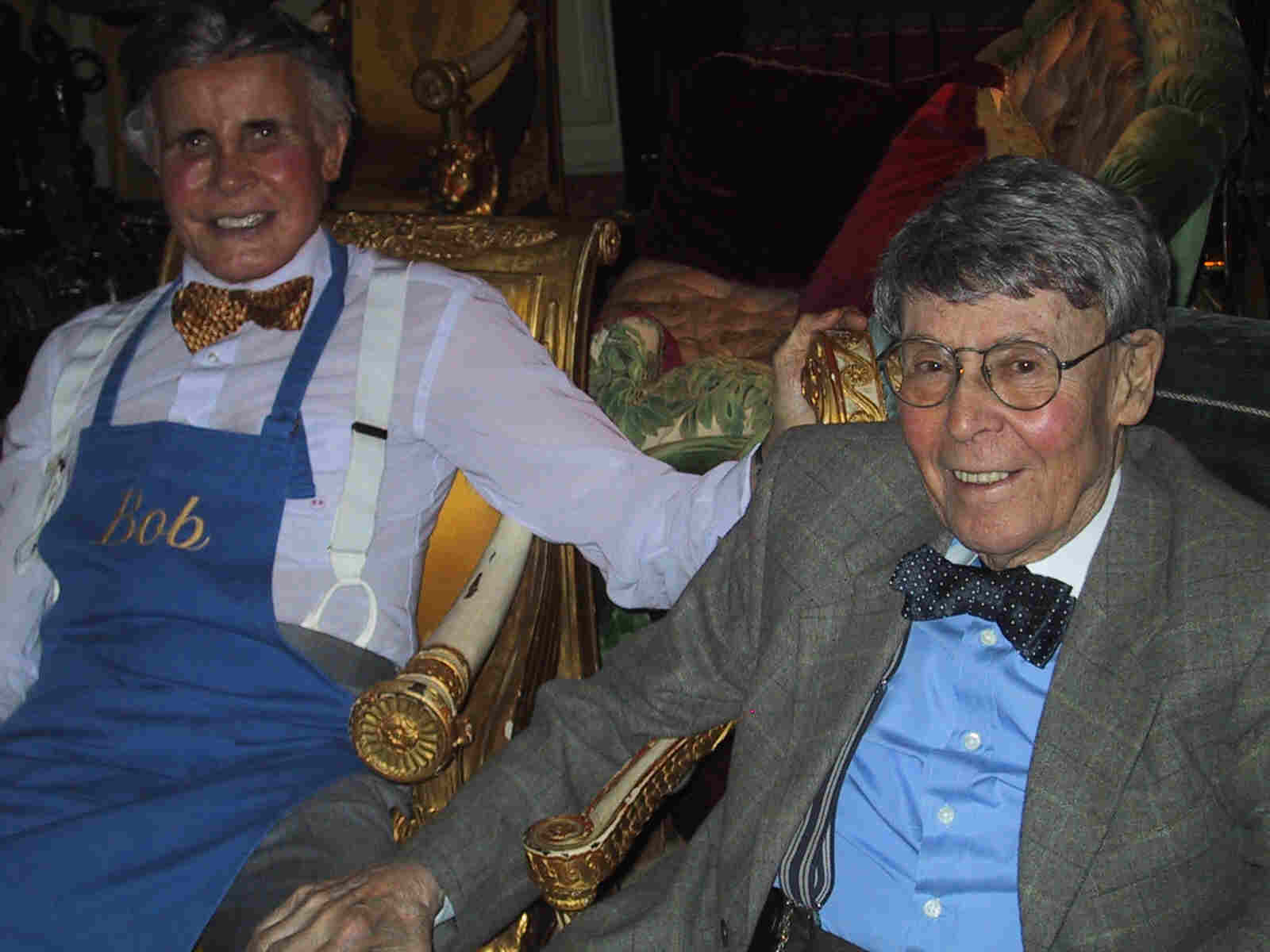
Robert Denning and Edgar de Evia in Robert Denning's apartment at the Lombardy Hotel, 2002.

Denning 'reinvented' himself to use his own word, after Vincent Fourcade's death from AIDS in 1992. Taking a lighter approach with more emphasis on effect and comfort than signed pieces of furniture, he used to laugh at how he would coach his early clients with decorating their children and grandchildren's homes. He was listed in the AD100, top hundred decorators by Architectural Digest for a number of years and once said: "I'll accept commissions from anyone who isn't frightened by my proposals." Also listed in New York The Top 100 Architects & Decorators and The New York Times Magazine in an article "Who Made It" he was listed as one of 15 interior designers who had become "celebrities in their own right".:

Technology permitting, Robert Denning would happily return to the nineteenth century. Since he can't, he devotes himself to re-creating – with international mixes of opulent furniture – the sumptuous interiors of his favorite era, using damask, silks, and taffetas.

His jobs have appeared not only in AD's pages, but those of every major magazine with home interiors. He always participated in charity benefits such as the auction to benefit Friends In Deed, a counseling organization for people with AIDS and cancer to decorating the main foyer of the von Stade mansion to benefit Southampton's Rogers Memorial Library. He was one of the decorators that contributed to the restoration of the 1932, 50 room mansion, of William Goadby Loew for the Smithers Alcoholism Treatment and Training Center on Manhattan's upper East side. "A sense of humor overlaying a deep commitment to style and a consuming passion for detail characterize all of Denning's work."

During the last decade of his life he tired of Paris, giving up his home that he had shared with Vincent in the 17th arrondissement. He was content in the familiar surroundings of his home and offices in the Lombardy Hotel in New York City, where both the lobby and restaurant were of his design.

He died in his apartment in New York City in 2005. His personal estate was featured in an auction at Doyle New York on May 17, 2006.
