= Vincent Fourcade =

French interior designer

Portrait of Vincent Fourcade

Vincent Gabriel Fourcade (27 February 1934 – 23 December 1992) was a French interior designer and the business and life partner of Robert Denning. "Outrageous luxury is what our clients want," he once said.

== Family and youth ==
"Born...to a family of distinguished French aesthetes, the designer spent many of his formative years in a twenty-bedroom house replete with made-to-order Majorelle furnishings." "I learned my trade by going out every evening as a young man," he told art historian Rosamond Bernier. "I went to every pretty house in France and Italy and other places too, and I remembered them all, even down to what was on each little table." Vincent was educated at University College London.

Fourcade was son of the French banking family, who had grown up with the Rothschilds.

== New York City ==
A handsome eligible bachelor, he was never without invitations in the United States either. He tried a career in banking, the business of his father and grandfather in Paris. He met Robert Denning in 1959. Denning a protégé of Edgar de Evia, had acquired an eye for design and effect from working with the photographer on sets for many fabric and furniture accounts, and with whom he shared one of the most magnificent Manhattan apartments on the top three floors of the Rhinelander Mansion. It would be here that early clients such as Lillian Bostwick Phipps and her husband Ogden Phipps would be entertained as de Evia was spending more and more time on his estate in Greenwich, Connecticut. While Vincent would take Ogden Phipps to good dealers where he would spend millions of dollars on signed pieces of French furniture, Bob would take Lillian Bostwick Phipps down to 11th Street. "It infuriated Vincent. He used to say 'Bobby, you have ruined the Phippses for me by giving Mrs. Phipps that strange appetite for 11th Street.'"

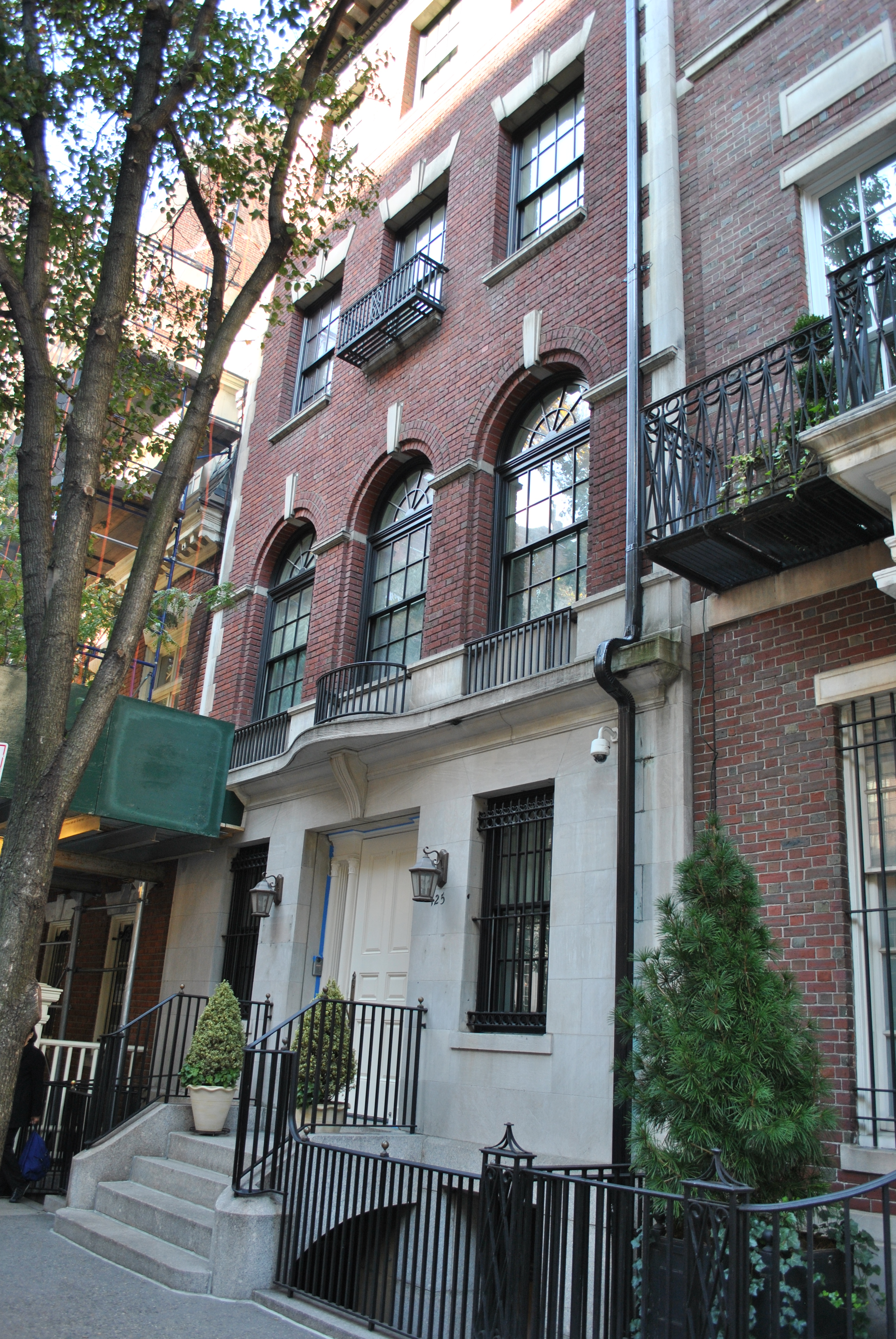
Vincent Fourcade and Robert Denning House, East 73rd Street, New York, New York

Fourcade and Denning later shared a red brick mansion on East 73rd Street in Manhattan and a house they built in Bridgehampton, Long Island; both houses were the subjects of articles in decorating magazines around the world.

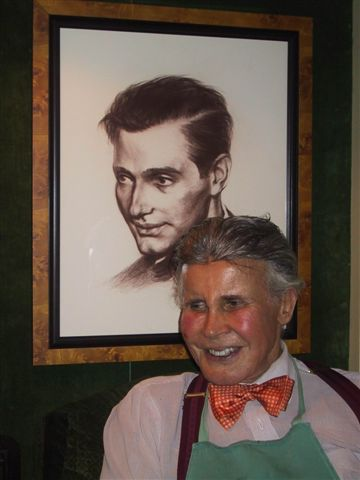
Robert Denning sitting in front of a portrait of Vincent Fourcade

== Denning & Fourcade ==
Slowly the pair became known for an extreme of luxury compared to le goût Rothschild. An early party that they styled included covering the floor with a hundred old raccoon coats. In 1960 they formed the firm of Denning & Fourcade, Inc. which would for over forty-five years set a standard for a list of clients that read like a social registry. Referred to in New York magazine as "...the Odd Couple. Boyish, down-to-earth Denning is the hardest worker, while Fourcade sniffs the client air to gauge if it's socially registered before he goes beyond the fringe." Early clients included old friends that he had known socially such as Michel David-Weill. Jackie Kennedy met his mark and two of her notes to him survive, the first thanking him for his letter after the assassination of her brother-in-law Robert F. Kennedy, with the cancellation over her signature since as the widow of a president of the United States she still had franking privileges. She lost this when she remarried. The other, a handwritten note postmarked 28 October 1976 over a thirteen cent stamp —

Dear Vincent, I have never eaten such delicious food in such incredibly beautiful surroundings in my life. Thank you so very very much. affectionately Jackie.

The return address also handwritten – Onassis, 1040 5th Ave.

== Living with AIDS ==
Early in the 1980s Fourcade contracted AIDS. He kept his looks and strength through most of that decade as Denning and he would divide their time between New York and Paris, crossing the Atlantic on the Concorde. His older brother Xavier Fourcade, the internationally known contemporary art dealer, died of the disease in 1987 at St. Luke's-Roosevelt Hospital Center in New York City.

By 1990 the disease would take control of his life. In early 1992 Denning & Fourcade would take the Concorde to Paris for the final time. He would live his remaining days in their apartment at 16 rue de Chazelles, just up the street from the studio of the sculptor Frédéric Bartholdi who is best known for the Statue of Liberty.
