= Merillat Industries =

American kitchen cabinet manufacturer

Merillat Industries was founded in Adrian, Michigan as an American manufacturer of kitchen cabinets in 1946 by Orville D. Merillat. Now retired, Richard Merillat, took over from his father as CEO and President.

The Merillat Industries corporate headquarters, still located in Adrian, are on US-223 just outside the Adrian city limits. They had 11 manufacturing plants and over 4,200 employees in 2004 and have operated as an independent unit of Masco Corporation, a Detroit building products conglomerate since 1985.

In 2004 Merillat and Duncanville, Texas based QualityCabinets joined to form the Masco Builder Cabinet Group. In late 2007 Merillat Industries dissolved and began going by this new moniker.

On September 22, 2008, Masco announced that it plans to close the Adrian plant in early 2009, stating the following as its reason of closure:

Given the unprecedented decline in new construction, however, more action is necessary. Obviously this was a very difficult decision with a high level of emotion as Adrian is the original founding plant for the Merillat brand. This closure is no reflection on the caliber of work nor the quality of the workforce. Rather, it is solely driven by deteriorating market conditions.

Approximately 300 people will be without jobs when the plant closes.

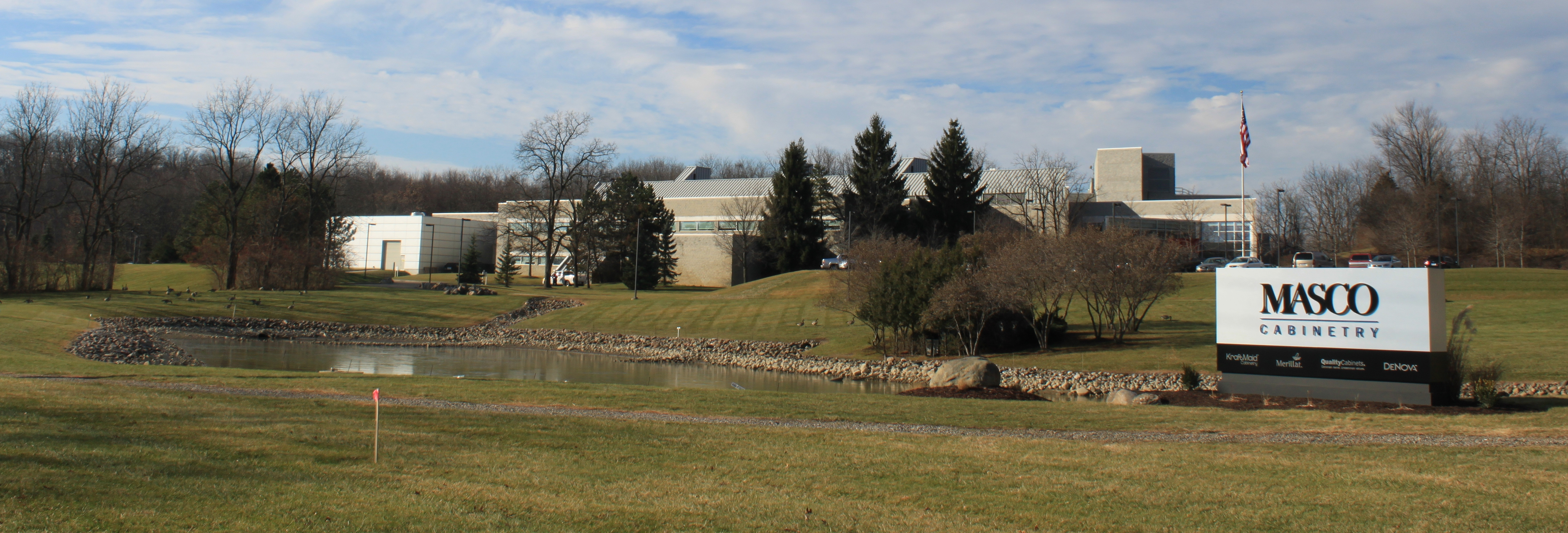
Masco Cabinetry headquarters, Ann Arbor Township, Michigan

In February 2010, the company announced a merger of the Adrian, Michigan-based Masco Builder Cabinet Group, and the Middlefield, Ohio-based Masco Retail Cabinet Group. The Retail Cabinet Group was most noted for producing the Kraftmaid, and Mills Pride cabinet brands. The new company that was formed has come to be known as Masco Cabinetry.

This new company is headquartered in Ann Arbor, Michigan at 4600 Arrowhead Drive. The company legally adopted its new name on January 1, 2011.
