= Émile Billard =

French sailor (1852–1930)

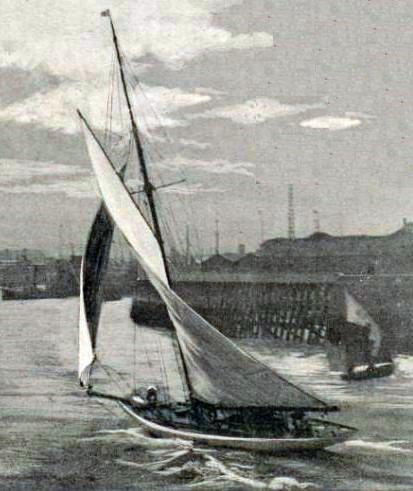

Personal information
- Full name: François Alexandre Émile Billard
- Born: 5 April 1852 Le Havre, Second French Empire
- Died: 29 June 1930 (aged 78) Le Havre, France

Sport

Sailing career
- Class: 10 to 20 ton
- Club: Société des Régates du Havre
Medal record
Sailing
Representing France
Olympic Games
Gold medal – first place	1900 Paris	10 to 20 ton

François Alexandre Émile Billard (5 April 1852 – 29 June 1930) was a French sailor who competed in the 1900 Summer Olympics in Paris, France. Billard took the gold in the 10 to 20 ton.
