= Duke of Decazes =

Title of French nobility

Dukedom of Decazes
- Creation date: 1820
- Created by: Louis XVIII
- First holder: Élie Decazes
- Present holder: Louis-Frédéric-René-Marie-Edouard Decazes, 6th Duke

Duke of Decazes, also called Duke Decazes (French: duc Decazes), is a title of French nobility that was granted in 1820 to Élie Decazes, a French statesman who served as Prime Minister of France from 19 November 1819 to 20 February 1820. He had already been made a French count in 1816. Separately, he was given the hereditary Danish title of Duke of Glücksborg upon his second marriage in 1818, which title was recognized in France in 1822.

In 1826, he founded Houillères et Fonderies de l'Aveyron, a mining and metal-working business in the Aveyron département that marked the beginning of industrialised metallurgy. In 1829, the name of Decazeville was given to the principal centre of the industry.

== List of Dukes ==
1. Élie Decazes, 1st Duke Decazes and of Glücksbierg (1780–1868), Prime Minister of France
2. Louis-Charles-Élie-Amanien Decazes, 2nd Duke Decazes and of Glücksbierg (1819–86), French Foreign Minister
3. Jean-Élie-Octave-Louis-Sévère-Amanien Decazes, 3rd Duke Decazes and of Glücksbierg (1864–1912), Olympic sailing competitor
4. Louis-Jean-Victor-Sévère Decazes, 4th Duke Decazes and of Glücksbierg (1889–1941), businessman and owner of Haras d'Ouilly
5. Élie Ludovic Henri Christian Decazes, 5th Duke Decazes and of Glücksbierg (1914–2011), President of the Polo de Paris from 1940 to 1950
6. Louis-Frédéric-René-Marie-Edouard Decazes, 6th Duke Decazes and of Glücksbierg (b. 1946), wine producer
