= Carlisle Collection =

American fashion design company

The Carlisle Collection is a U.S. fashion design company founded in 1981 by William Rondina, to offer elegant classic clothing and accessories for women by private appointment. Based in New York City, the firm has an extensive network of sales consultants in over 500 cities and upscale suburbs throughout the United States. The company's offices are located in mid-town Manhattan.

The Carlisle representatives, called consultants, are well-connected socially, draw from their friends and acquaintances, and build a loyal following. As The New York Times reported in 2002 in Ginia Bellafante's article "Clothes That Whisper, I Belong to the Club," the company is predicated on the idea that the sales staff will inspire loyalty from the clients because the sellers come from the same socioeconomic class they do."

On an annual basis, the Carlisle design team creates a unique silk scarf that benefits the Susan G. Komen for the Cure foundation. Since 1998, Carlisle's Fabric of Hope annual scarf program has raised over $1.5 Billion for the foundation's effort to help save lives and end breast cancer forever.

== History ==
On February 9, 2012, The Connaught Group, parent company to Carlisle Collection, filed for Chapter 11 Bankruptcy and made plans to sell the company at auction. On April 5, 2012, women’s wear direct-seller The Connaught Group was sold for $22 million to a joint venture between Tennessee-based and Hong Kong’s Royal Spirit Group, following an April 5 bankruptcy auction in New York. The new parent company "Carlisle Etcetera LLC" assumed control of the Carlisle Collection and the related direct sales fashion line Etcetera. The purchase price consisted of $20 million in cash and the assumption of the lease for Connaught’s midtown Manhattan office spaces. Royal Spirit Group, a clothing manufacturer that was Connaught’s largest creditor, also waived its $5.4 million general unsecured claim.

As of April 2013, it was reported by Carlisle Etcetera LLC - CEO that the new company has turned a profit in their first calendar year since assuming control.

In 2015, Hong Kong’s Royal Spirit Group acquired CARLISLE from founding parent company, The Connaught Group.

CARLISLE made its runway debut at NYFW in February 2018 featuring its Fall 2018 collection designed by Fred Tutino and styled by celebrity stylist Micaela Erlanger.
