= Daisy Fellowes =

French author and fashion icon (1890–1962)

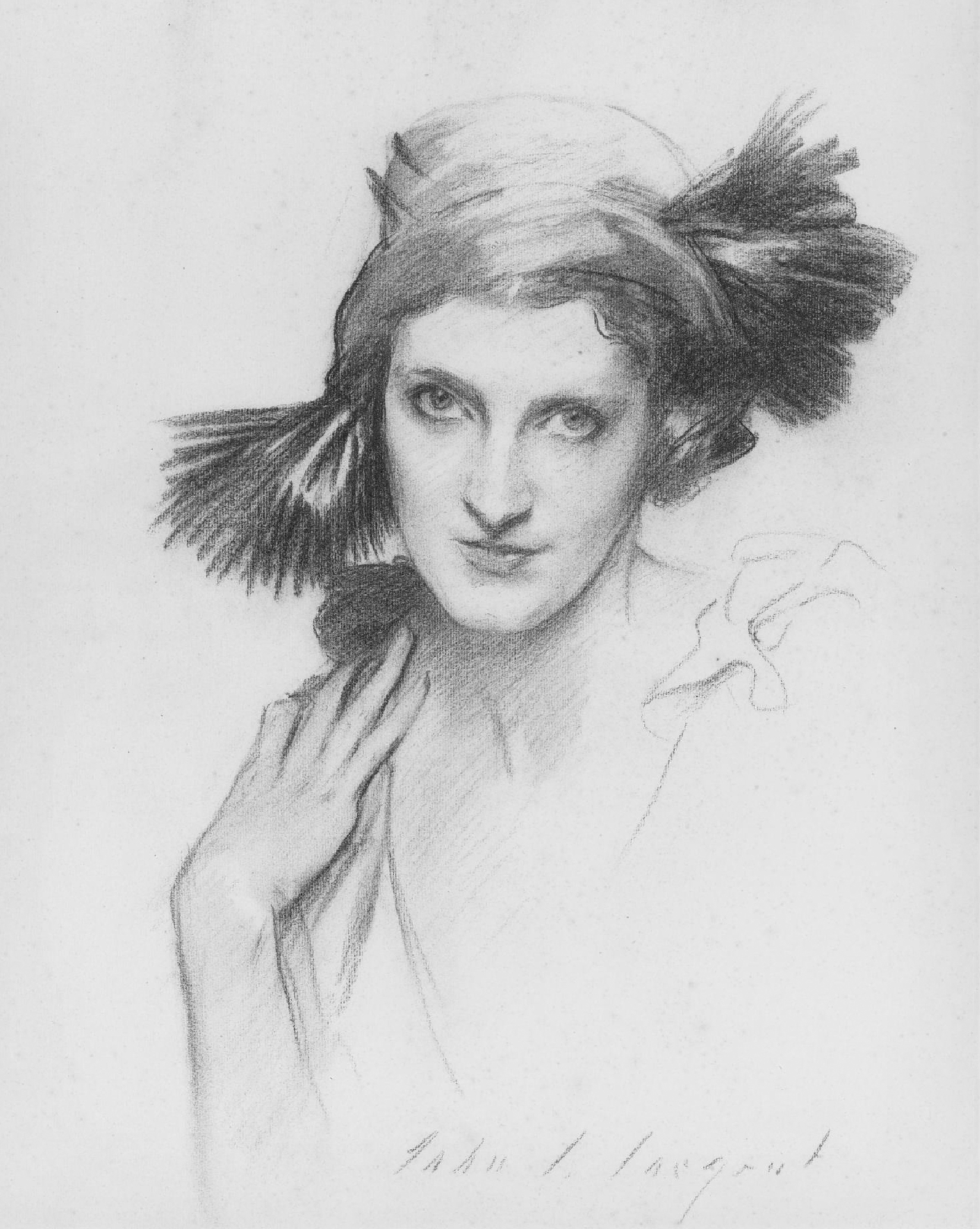
- Portrait of Fellowes by John Singer Sargent
- Born: Marguerite Séverine Philippine Decazes de Glücksbierg; 29 April 1890; Paris, France
- Died: 13 December 1962 (aged 72); Paris, France
- Other name: Daisy
- Occupation: Socialite
- Spouses: Jean Amédée Marie Anatole de Broglie, Prince de Broglie (m. 1910; died 1918) The Hon. Reginald Fellowes (m. 1919; died 1953)
- Children: 4

Daisy Fellowes (née Marguerite Séverine Philippine Decazes de Glücksbierg; 29 April 1890 – 13 December 1962) was a prominent French socialite, acclaimed beauty, minor novelist and poet, Paris editor of American Harper's Bazaar, fashion icon, and an heiress to the Singer sewing machine fortune.

== Parents and childhood ==
Born in Paris and known as Daisy, she was the only daughter of Isabelle-Blanche Singer (1869–1896) and Jean Élie Octave Louis Sévère Amanien Decazes de Glücksbierg (1864–1912), 3rd Duke Decazes and Duke of Glücksbierg. Her maternal grandfather was Isaac Singer, the American sewing machine pioneer. After her mother's suicide, she and her siblings were largely raised by their maternal aunt, Winnaretta Singer (Princess Edmond de Polignac), a noted patron of the arts, particularly music.

== First marriage ==
Her first husband, whom she married on 10 May 1910 in Paris, was Jean Amédée Marie Anatole de Broglie, Prince de Broglie (born in Paris on 27 January 1886). He reportedly died of influenza on 20 February 1918 while serving with the French Army in Mascara, Algeria, though there was gossip that he actually committed suicide as a result of his homosexuality having been exposed.

Through his mother Jeanne Eméline, Princesse de Broglie, née Cabot de Dampmartin (1864–1901), Jean Amédée Marie Anatole de Broglie was related to Pierre Victor, Baron de Besenval, the former owner of the Hôtel de Besenval. Accordingly, the family still possessed some heirlooms of this Swiss noble family with once excellent connections in France.

Daisy and Jean Amédée Marie Anatole de Broglie's country estate was Compton Beauchamp House in Oxfordshire, where they raised three daughters:

- Princess Emmeline Isabelle Edmée Séverine de Broglie (Neuilly, 16 February 1911 – Onez, Switzerland, 10 September 1986). Married to Marie Alexandre William Alvar de Biaudos, Comte de Castéja (Paris, 6 April 1907 – Paris, 6 July 1983) in Neuilly, 8 November 1932. Accused of collaboration during World War II, Emmeline de Castéja spent five months in the prison at Fresnes, France.
- Princess Isabelle Marguerite Jeanne Pauline de Broglie (Lamorlaye, 27 July 1912 – Geneva, 18 July 1960). Married to Olivier Charles Humbert Marie, Marquis de La Moussaye (La Poterie, 26 Mars 1908 – Paris, 20 October 1988) in Neuilly, 3 June 1931. Divorced in Paris, 13 April 1945. Isabelle de La Moussaye was a novelist.

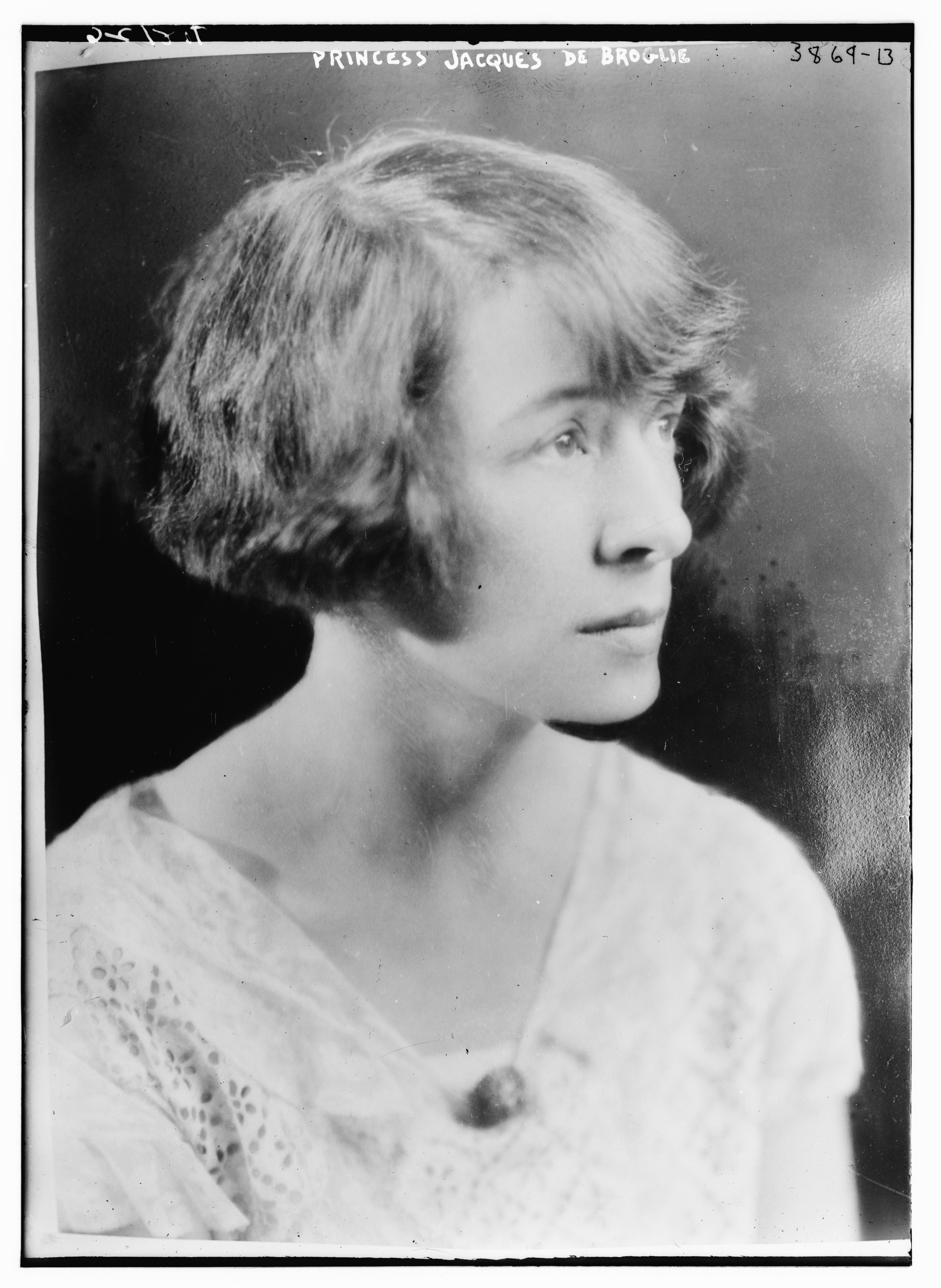
Princess Jacques de Broglie

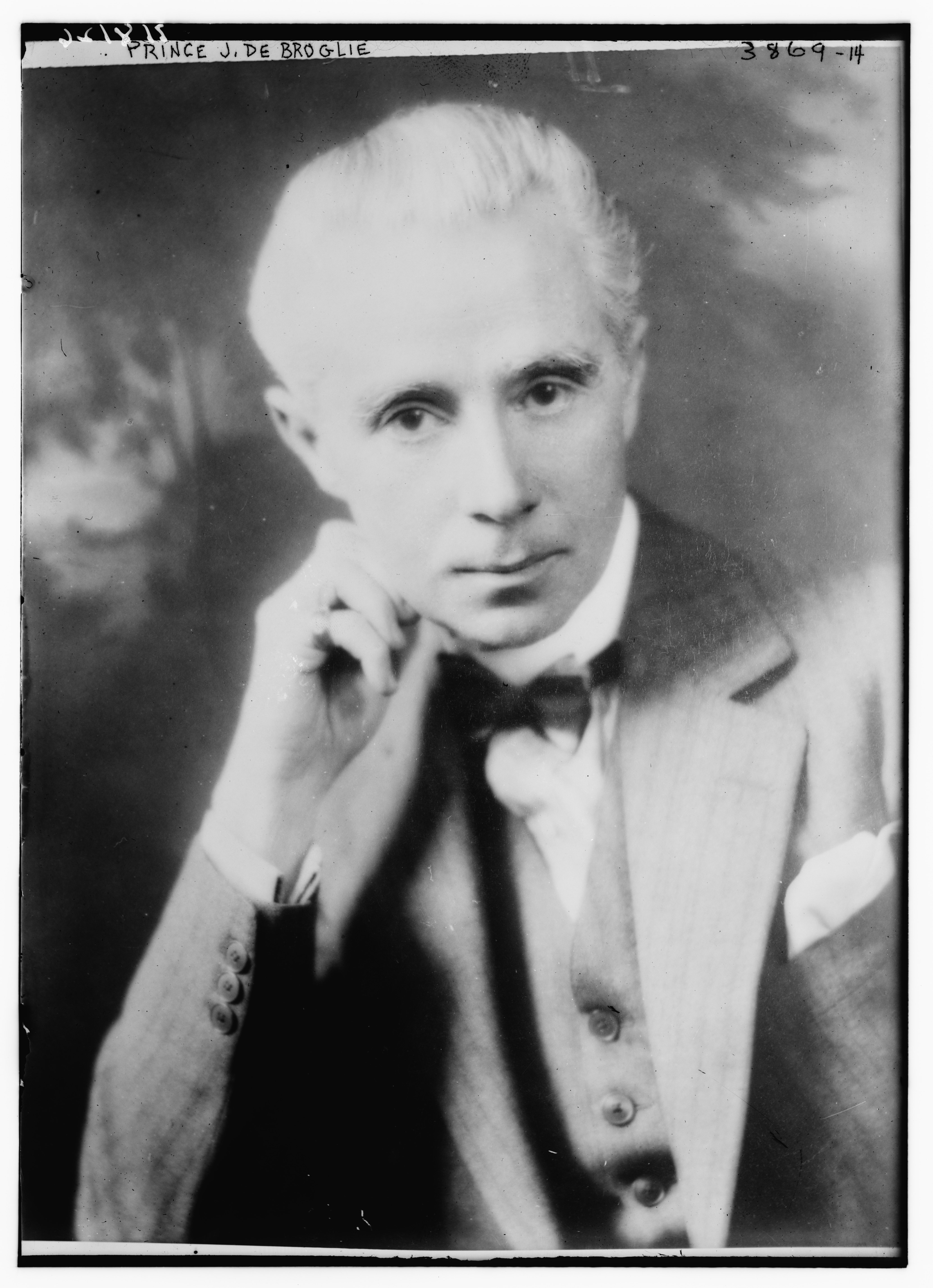
Prince Jacques de Broglie

- Princess Jacqueline Marguerite de Broglie (Paris, 5 January 1918 – Crans-Montana, Valais 26 February 1965). Married to Alfred Ignaz Maria Kraus (Sarajevo, 28 November 1908–) in Neuilly, France, 6 October 1941. Divorced in Münster, 3 February 1958. After her husband—a Siemens electronics senior manager who served as a counter-espionage agent with the Abwehr— was accused of betraying members of the French Resistance during World War II to protect his wife, also a member of the Resistance, Jacqueline Kraus had her head shaved as punishment.

Of her Broglie children, the notoriously caustic Fellowes once said, "The eldest, Emmeline, is like my first husband only a great deal more masculine; the second, Isabelle, is like me without guts; [and] the third, Jacqueline, was the result of a horrible man called Lischmann ...."

== Second marriage ==
Her second husband, whom she married on 9 August 1919 in London, was The Hon. Reginald Ailwyn Fellowes (1884–1953), of Donnington Grove. He was a banker, cousin of Winston Churchill and the son of William Fellowes, 2nd Baron de Ramsey.

They had one child, Rosamond Daisy Fellowes (1921–1998). She married her first husband in 1941 (divorced 1945), Captain James Gladstone, and had one son, James Reginald (born 1943). She married her second husband in 1953 (divorced), Tadeusz Maria Wiszniewski (1917–2005); they had one daughter, Diana Marguerite Mary Wiszniewska (born 1953).

== Affairs ==
Among Fellowes's lovers was Duff Cooper, the British ambassador to France. She also attempted to seduce Winston Churchill, but failed, shortly before marrying his cousin Reginald Fellowes.

== Literary works ==
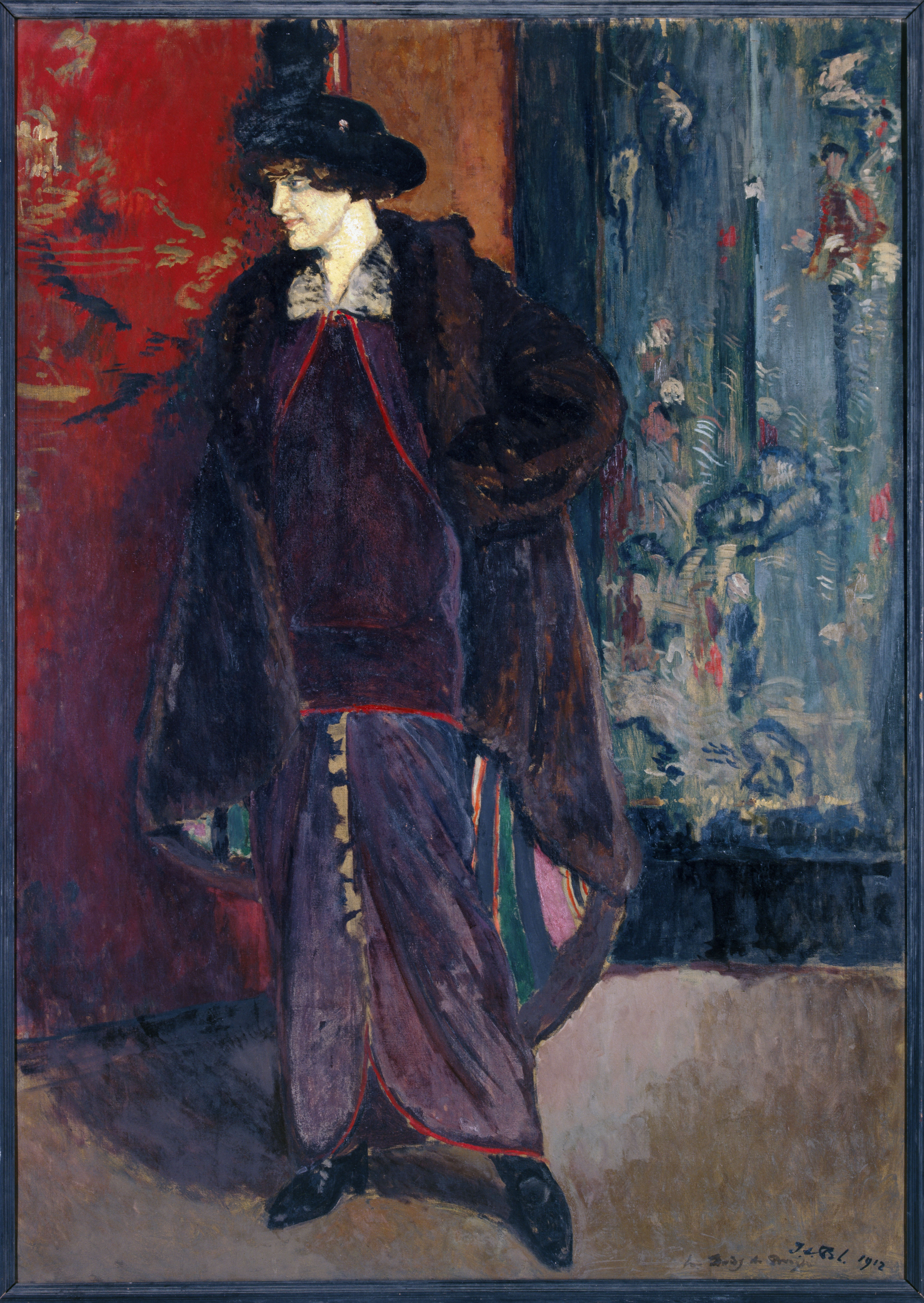
Portrait of Fellowes by Jacques-Émile Blanche

Fellowes wrote several novels and at least one epic poem. Her best-known work is Les dimanches de la comtesse de Narbonne (1931, published in English as "Sundays"). She also wrote the novel Cats in the Isle of Man.

== Status as fashion icon ==
She was known for her distinctive fashion plates in the twentieth century and was an important patron of the surrealist couturier Elsa Schiaparelli. She was a friend of the jeweller Suzanne Belperron and a longtime customer of Cartier.

== Death ==
Daisy Fellowes died on 13 December 1962 at her hôtel particulier in Paris at number 69, rue de Lille.

== See also ==
- Baron de Ramsey
- Carlos de Beistegui
- Duke of Decazes
- House of Broglie
- List of incidents of cannibalism § 1930s
