= Friends In Deed =

Non-profit organization

Friends In Deed is a non-profit organization headquartered in New York City, founded in 1991 by Cynthia O'Neal and Mike Nichols as a response to the growing AIDS crisis. The organization was founded to provide support for people with life-threatening illnesses as well as the friends and family of those with such illnesses, and for anyone experiencing grief or bereavement for any reason.

== Philosophy ==
According to Nichols and O'Neal, Friends In Deed's purpose is to promote the idea that the quality of life does not depend on the circumstances. During an appearance on The Oprah Winfrey Show in 2005, O'Neal said that American culture views illness, dying, and death as a form of failure, and that this causes Americans to be unable to deal with terminal illnesses. In order to help its clients cope with the idea of death, Friends In Deed focuses on being "present-minded": giving people a sense of perspective about their illness, discouraging them from living in a state of rage or negativity.

== Jonathan Larson and RENT ==
Jonathan Larson, the author and composer of the Pulitzer Prize winning musical RENT, attended several Friends In Deed meetings shortly after the group's founding in 1991. The "Life Support" group in the RENT musical is based on Larson's experiences with Friends In Deed, including explicit references to the Friends In Deed philosophy (e.g. "no day but today," the question of losing one's dignity, etc.) Cynthia O'Neal was invited to give a support group for the original cast of RENT at the New York Theatre Workshop, and has been invited on several occasions to meet subsequent casts of RENT.
