= List of Vogue (US) cover models =

This list of Vogue cover models (1920–present) is a catalog of cover models who have appeared on the cover of the American fashion magazine Vogue.

== 1920s ==
=== 1920 ===
Issue	Cover model	Illustrator
January 1		
February 1		
February 15		
March 1		
March 15		
April 1		
April 15		
May 1		
May 15		
June 1		
June 15		
July 1		
July 15		
August 1		
August 15		
September 1		
September 15		
October 1		
October 15		
November 1		
November 15		
December 1		
December 15		

=== 1921 ===
Issue	Cover model	Illustrator
January 1		
February 1		
February 15		
March 1		
March 15		
April 1		
April 15		
May 1		
May 15		
June 1		
June 15		
July 1		
July 15		
August 1		
August 15		
September 1		
September 15		
October 1		
October 15		
November 1		
November 15		
December 1		
December 15		

=== 1922 ===
Issue	Cover model	Illustrator
January 1		
February 1		
February 15		
March 1		
March 15		
April 1		
April 15		
May 1		
May 15		
June 1		
June 15		
July 1		
July 15		
August 1		
August 15		
September 1		
September 15		
October 1		
October 15		
November 1		
November 15		
December 1		
December 15		

=== 1923 ===
Issue	Cover model	Illustrator
January 1		
February 1		
February 15		
March 1		
March 15		
April 1		
April 15		
May 1		
May 15		
June 1		
June 15		
July 1		
July 15		
August 1		
August 15		
September 1		
September 15		
October 1		
October 15		
November 1		
November 15		
December 1		
December 15		

=== 1924 ===
Issue	Cover model	Illustrator
January 1		
January 15		
February 1		
February 15		
March 1		
March 15		
April 1		
April 15		
May 1		
May 15		
June 1		
June 15		
July 1		
July 15		
August 1		
August 15		
September 1		
September 15		
October 1		
October 15		
November 1		
November 15		
December 1		
December 15		

=== 1925 ===
Issue	Cover model	Illustrator
January 1		Georges Lepape
January 15		George Wolfe Plank
February 1		Georges Lepape
February 15		Charles Martin
March 1		Georges Lepape
March 15		Pierre Brissaud
April 1		André Édouard Marty
April 15		George Wolfe Plank
May 1		Georges Lepape
May 15		Pierre Brissaud
June 1		Georges Lepape
June 15		George Wolfe Plank
July 1		Georges Lepape
July 15		Joseph B. Platt
August 1		Pierre Brissaud
August 15		André Édouard Marty
September 1		Harriet Meserole
September 15		Libiszenski
October 1		Guillermo Bolin
October 15		Georges Lepape
November 1		George Wolfe Plank
November 15		Eduardo Benito
December 1		Pierre Brissaud
December 15		Eduardo Benito

=== 1926 ===
Issue	Cover model	Illustrator
January 1		Georges Lepape
January 15		André Édouard Marty
February 1		André Édouard Marty
February 15		Pierre Brissaud
March 1		Porter Woodruff
March 15		Georges Lepape
April 1		Eduardo Benito
April 15		Georges Lepape
May 1		Eduardo Benito
May 15		George Wolfe Plank
June 1		Guillermo Bolin
June 15		Eduardo Benito
July 1		Eduardo Benito
July 15		Eduardo Benito
August 1		Harriet Meserole
August 15		André Édouard Marty
September 1		Eduardo Benito
September 15		Harriet Meserole
October 1		Guillermo Bolin
October 15		Eduardo Benito
November 1		Guillermo Bolin
November 15		Eduardo Benito
December 1		Guillermo Bolin
December 15		Allen Saalburg

=== 1927 ===
Issue	Cover model	Illustrator
January 1		George Wolfe Plank|-
January 15		Eduardo Benito
February 1		Georges Lepape
February 15		George Wolfe Plank
March 1		Harriet Meserole
March 15		Georges Lepape
April 1		Eduardo Benito
April 15		Guillermo Bolin
May 1		Georges Lepape
May 15		Harriet Meserole
June 1		Guillermo Bolin
June 15		Eduardo Benito
July 1		Pierre Brissaud
July 15		Harriet Meserole
August 1		Georges Lepape
August 15		Georges Lepape
September 1		Pierre Brissaud
September 15		Harriet Meserole
October 1		Pierre Mourgue
October 15		Eduardo Benito
November 1		Guillermo Bolin
November 15		Georges Lepape
December 1		Eduardo Benito
December 15		Pierre Mourgue

=== 1928 ===
Issue	Cover model	Illustrator
January 1		Georges Lepape
January 15		Porter Woodruff
February 1		Eduardo Benito
February 15		Eduardo Benito
March 1		Georges Lepape
March 15		Georges Lepape
April 1		Georges Lepape
April 15		Eduardo Benito
May 1		Georges Lepape
May 15		Eduardo Benito
June 1		Guillermo Bolin
June 15		Georges Lepape
July 1		Eduardo Benito
July 15		Pierre Mourgue
August 1		Pierre Brissaud
August 15		Georges Lepape
September 1		Eduardo Benito
September 15		Pierre Mourgue
September 29		Georges Lepape
October 13		Eduardo Benito
October 27		Eduardo Benito
November 10		Guillermo Bolin
November 24		Eduardo Benito
December 8		Eduardo Benito
December 22		Jean Pagès

=== 1929 ===
Issue	Cover model	Illustrator
January 5		Eduardo Benito
January 19		Guillermo Bolin
February 2		Georges Lepape
February 16		Eduardo Benito
March 2		Georges Lepape
March 16		Pierre Mourgue
March 30		Georges Lepape
April 13		Eduardo Benito
April 27		Pierre Mourgue
May 11		Georges Lepape
May 25		Eduardo Benito
June 8		Guillermo Bolin
June 22		Georges Lepape
July 6		Eduardo Benito
July 20		Georges Lepape
August 3		André Édouard Marty
August 17		Eduardo Benito
August 31		Georges Lepape
September 14		Pierre Mourgue
September 28		Eduardo Benito
October 12		Georges Lepape
October 26		Eduardo Benito
November 9		Eduardo Benito
November 23		Eduardo Benito
December 7		Georges Lepape
December 21		Eduardo Benito

== 1930s ==
=== 1930 ===
Issue	Cover model	Illustrator
January 4		Guillermo Bolin
January 18		Eduardo Benito
February 1		Georges Lepape
February 18		Eduardo Benito
March 1		Georges Lepape
March 15		Pierre Mourgue
March 29		Georges Lepape
April 12		Jean Pagès
April 26		Pierre Mourgue
May 10		Georges Lepape
May 24		Eduardo Benito
June 7		Harriet Meserole
June 19		Georges Lepape
July 5		Eduardo Benito
July 19		Georges Lepape
August 2		André Édouard Marty
August 16		Eduardo Benito
September 1		Alix Zeilinger
September 15		Pierre Mourgue
September 29		Eduardo Benito
October 13		Georges Lepape
October 27		Eduardo Benito
November 10		Carl Erickson
November 24		Georges Lepape
December 8		Georges Lepape
December 22		Pierre Mourgue

=== 1931 ===
Issue	Cover model	Illustrator
January 1		Eduardo Benito
January 15		Georges Lepape
February 1		Eduardo Benito
February 15		Pierre Mourgue
March 1		Eduardo Benito
March 15		Georges Lepape
April 1		Marie Laurencin
April 15		Eduardo Benito
May 1		Carl Erickson
May 15		Georges Lepape
June 1		Jean Pagès
June 15		Georges Lepape
July 1		Georges Lepape
July 15		Georges Lepape
August 1		Alix Zeilinger
August 15		Georges Lepape
September 1		Eduardo Benito
September 15		Pierre Mourgue
October 1		Georges Lepape
October 15		Eduardo Benito
November 1		Carl Erickson
November 15		Georges Lepape
December 1		Eduardo Benito
December 15		Georges Lepape

=== 1932 ===
Issue	Cover model	Photographer/Illustrator
January 1		Carl Erickson
January 15		Georges Lepape
February 1		Eduardo Benito
February 15		Carl Erickson
March 1		Georges Lepape
March 15		Pierre Mourgue
April 1		Carl Erickson
April 15		Guillermo Bolin
May 1		Eduardo Benito
May 15		Jean Pagès
June 1		Alix Zeilinger
June 15		Carl Erickson
July 1		Edward Steichen
July 15		Guillermo Bolin
August 1		Eduardo Benito
August 15		Georges Lepape
September 1		André Édouard Marty
September 15		Eduardo Benito
October 1		Carl Erickson
October 15		Georges Lepape
November 1		Pierre Mourgue
November 15		Eduardo Benito
December 1		Jean Pagès
December 15		Carl Erickson

=== 1933 ===
Issue	Cover model	Photographer/Illustrator
January 1		Eduardo Benito
January 15		Carl Erickson
February 1		Georges Lepape
February 15		Eduardo Benito
March 1		Georges Lepape
March 15		Alix Zeilinger
April 1		Carl Erickson
April 15		Ruth Sigrid Grafstrom
May 1		George Hoyningen-Huene
May 15		Alix Zeilinger
June 1		Carl Erickson
June 15		Georges Lepape
July 1		Eduardo Benito
July 15		Pierre Mourgue
August 1		Eduardo Benito
August 15	Toto Koopman	George Hoyningen-Huene
September 1		Jean Pagès
September 15		Carl Erickson
October 1		Eduardo Benito
October 15		Georges Lepape
November 1		Pierre Mourgue
November 15		Carl Erickson
December 1		Edward Steichen
December 15		Jean Pagès

=== 1934 ===
Issue	Cover model	Photographer/Illustrator
January 1		Anton Bruehl
January 15		Carl Erickson
February 1		George Hoyningen-Huene
February 15		Alix Zeilinger
March 1		Edward Steichen
March 15		Eduardo Benito
April 1		Carl Erickson
April 15	Annabella	George Hoyningen-Huene
May 1		Ruth Sigrid Grafstrom
May 15		Alix Zeilinger
June 1		Georges Lepape
June 15		Eduardo Benito
July 1		Carl Erickson
July 15		Anton Bruehl; Fernand Bourges
August 1		Eduardo Benito
August 15		Ruth Sigrid Grafstrom
September 1		Carl Erickson
September 15		Pierre Mourgue
October 1		Jean Pagès
October 15		Eduardo Benito
November 1		Alix Zeilinger
November 15		Carl Erickson
December 1		Carl Erickson
December 15	Miriam Hopkins	George Hoyningen-Huene

=== 1935 ===
Issue	Cover model	Photographer/Illustrator
January 1		Ruth Sigrid Grafstrom
January 15		Edward Steichen
February 1		George Hoyningen-Huene
February 15		Carl Erickson
March 1		Pierre Mourgue
March 15		Eduardo Benito
April 1		Pavel Tchelitchew
April 15		George Hoyningen-Huene
May 1		Marcel Vertès
May 15		Carl Erickson
June 1		Christian Bérard
June 15		Jean Pagès
July 1		George Hoyningen-Huene
July 15		Cecil Beaton
August 1		René Bouët-Willaumez
August 15	Betty McLauchlen	Anton Bruehl
September 1		Horst P. Horst
September 15		Carl Erickson
October 1		Eduardo Benito
October 15		Pierre Roy
November 1	Betty McLauchlen	Edward Steichen
November 15		Giorgio de Chirico
December 1		Anton Bruehl
December 15		Carl Erickson

=== 1936 ===
Issue	Cover model	Photographer
January 1		Edward Steichen
January 15		Pierre Mourgue
February 1		Christian Bérard
February 15		Carl Erickson
March 1	Betty McLauchlen	Horst P. Horst
March 15		Pavel Tchelitchew
April 1		Cecil Beaton
April 15		Carl Erickson
May 1		René Bouët-Willaumez
May 15		Anton Bruehl
June 1		Pierre Roy
June 15	Helen Bennett	Edward Steichen
July 1		Anton Bruehl
July 15		Horst P. Horst
August 1		Edward Steichen
August 15		René Bouët-Willaumez
September 1		Carl Erickson
September 15		René Bouët-Willaumez
October 1		Christian Bérard
October 15		Anton Bruehl; Fernand Bourges
November 1		Edward Steichen
November 15		Horst P. Horst
December 1		Pierre Roy
December 15		Jean Pagès

=== 1937 ===
Issue	Cover model	Photographer/Illustrator
January 1	Helen Bennett	Horst P. Horst
January 15		Carl Erickson
February 1		Anton Bruehl; Fernand Bourges
February 15		Raymond de Lavererie
March 1		René Bouët-Willaumez
March 15	Mary Taylor	Cecil Beaton
April 1		Eduardo Benito
April 15		Christian Bérard
May 1		Carl Erickson
May 15		Horst P. Horst
June 1		Toni Frissell
June 15		Anton Bruehl
July 1		Miguel Covarrubias
July 15		Eduardo Benito
August 1		Pierre Roy
August 15		Toni Frissell
September 1		Christian Bérard
September 15		Carl Erickson
October 1		Christian Bérard
October 15	Ludmila Feodoseyevna	Horst P. Horst
November 1		Carl Erickson
November 15		Morris Kantor
December 1		Pierre Roy
December 15	Hilda Sturm	Toni Frissell

=== 1938 ===
Issue	Cover model	Photographer/Illustrator
January 1		René Bouët-Willaumez
January 15	Ludmila Fedoseyeva	Horst P. Horst
February 1		Victor Bobritsky
February 15	Angelica Welldon	Horst P. Horst
March 1		Christian Bérard
March 15		Carl Erickson
April 1		Pierre Roy
April 15		René Bouët-Willaumez
May 1		Anton Bruehl
May 15	Helen Bennett	Horst P. Horst
June 1		Ivan Dmitri
June 15		Carl Erickson
July 1		Georges Lepape
July 15		Suzanne Eisendieck
August 1	Helen Bennett	Horst P. Horst
August 15		Toni Frissell
September 1		Eduardo Benito
September 15		Carl Erickson
October 1		Eduardo Benito
October 15		Jean Pagès
November 1		Pierre Roy
November 15		Carl Erickson
December 1		Eduardo Benito
December 15		Toni Frissell

=== 1939 ===
Issue	Cover model	Photographer/Illustrator
January 1		Horst P. Horst
January 15		Suzanne Eisendieck
February 1		Witold Gordon
February 15		Horst P. Horst
March 1		Carl Erickson
March 15		Eduardo Benito
April 1	Muriel Maxwell; Georgia Carroll	Horst P. Horst
April 15	Helen Bennett	Horst P. Horst
May 1		Eduardo Benito
May 15	Muriel Maxwell	Horst P. Horst
June 1		Salvador Dalí
June 15		Christian Bérard
July 1	Muriel Maxwell	Horst P. Horst
July 15		Carl Erickson
August 1	Babe Paley	Horst P. Horst
August 15		André de Dienes
September 1		Carl Erickson
September 15		Christian Bérard
October 1	Andre Lorain	Toni Frissell
October 15		Ruth Sigrid Grafstrom
November 1	Helen Bennett; Muriel Maxwell; Florence Dornin	Horst P. Horst
November 15		Carl Erickson
December 1		Anton Bruehl
December 15		Toni Frissell

== 1940s ==
=== 1940 ===
Issue	Cover model	Photographer
January 1	Helen Bennett	Horst P. Horst
January 15	Muriel Maxwell; Lisa Fonssagrives; Unknown	Anton Bruehl
February 1	Susann Shaw	Edward Steichen
February 15		Horst P. Horst
March 1		Horst P. Horst
March 15	Georgia Carroll	Toni Frissell
April 1		Milena Pavlović-Barili
April 15	Halldis Prince	Toni Frissell
May 1	Kay Herman	Horst P. Horst
May 15	Gene Tierney	Horst P. Horst
June 1	Lisa Fonssagrives	Horst P. Horst
June 15		Eduardo Benito
July 1		Toni Frissell
July 15		Pierre Roy
August 1	Muriel Maxwell	Horst P. Horst
August 15		Toni Frissell
September 1	Lisa Fonssagrives	Horst P. Horst
September 15	Helen Bennett	Horst P. Horst
October 1	Lisa Fonssagrives	John Rawlings
October 15	Laurie Douglas	Horst P. Horst
November 1	Susann Shaw	Toni Frissell
November 15	Laurie Douglas	Horst P. Horst
December 1	Meg Mundy	John Rawlings
December 15	Maureen Zollman	John Rawlings

=== 1941 ===
Issue	Cover model	Photographer
January 1		Toni Frissell
January 15	Muriel Maxwell; Meg Mundy; Susann Shaw; Helen Bennett; Unknown	John Rawlings
February 1		
February 15	Laurie Douglas	John Rawlings
March 1	Tina McDonnell	John Rawlings
March 15	Laurie Douglas	John Rawlings
April 1	Susann Shaw	Horst P. Horst
April 15		Mehemed Fehmy Agha
May 1	Meg Mundy	John Rawlings
May 15	Florence Dornin	Horst P. Horst
June 1	Maureen Zollman; Unknown; Meg Mundy	John Rawlings
June 15		Toni Frissell
July 1	Sandy Rice	Toni Frissell
July 15		René Bouët-Willaumez
August 1	Alice Alexander	Horst P. Horst
August 15	Sabrina Weber	Horst P. Horst
September 1	Betty McLauchlen	Horst P. Horst
September 15	Meg Mundy	Horst P. Horst
October 1		Carl Erickson
October 15	Betty McLauchlen	Horst P. Horst
November 1	Bettina Bolegard	Horst P. Horst
November 15		
December 1	Betty McLauchlen	John Rawlings
December 15	Alice Alexander	John Rawlings

=== 1942 ===
Issue	Cover model	Photographer
January 1	Sandy Rice	John Rawlings
January 15		René Bouët-Willaumez
February 1		
February 15	Unknown; Betty McLauchlen; Bettina Bolegard; Dana Jenney; Unknown	John Rawlings
March 1		Horst P. Horst
March 15	Betty McLauchlen	Horst P. Horst
April 1	Meg Mundy	John Rawlings
April 15		John Rawlings
May 1	Dana Jenney	John Rawlings
May 15	Maureen Zollman	John Rawlings
June 1	Betty McLauchlen	John Rawlings
June 15		Horst P. Horst
July 1	Susann Shaw	Toni Frissell
July 15	Bettina Bolegard	Alexander Liberman
August 1	Lenore Simon	Horst P. Horst
August 15		Horst P. Horst
September 1	Meg Mundy	John Rawlings
September 15	Betty McLauchlen	John Rawlings
October 1	Susann Shaw	John Rawlings
October 15	Marilyn Ambrose	Horst P. Horst
November 1		René Bouët-Willaumez
November 15		René Bouët-Willaumez
December 1	Lenore Simon	John Rawlings
December 15	Betty McLauchlen	Horst P. Horst

=== 1943 ===
Issue	Cover model	Photographer
January 1	Jessica Patton	Horst P. Horst
January 15	Selene Mahri	Horst P. Horst
February 1		Alexander Liberman
February 15	Muriel Maxwell	Horst P. Horst
March 1	Bijou Barrington	John Rawlings
March 15	Dana Jenney; Sabine Weber	Toni Frissell
April 1		John Rawlings
April 15	Betty McLauchlen	Horst P. Horst
May 1	Audrey L. Quinn	John Rawlings
May 15	Susann Shaw	Horst P. Horst
June 1	Florence Dornin	John Rawlings
June 15	Bettina Bolegard	Horst P. Horst
July 1		Navy Photograph
July 15		John Rawlings
August 1	Bijou Barrington	Horst P. Horst
August 15		Horst P. Horst
September 1	Laurie Douglas	John Rawlings
September 15	Barbara Tullgren	John Rawlings
October 1		Irving Penn
October 15	Barbara Tullgren	Constantin Joffé
November 1	Susann Shaw	John Rawlings
November 15	Marilyn Ambrose	John Rawlings
December 1	Kay Hernan	Irving Penn
December 15	Leslie Venable	John Rawlings

=== 1944 ===
Issue	Cover model	Photographer
January 1	Marilyn Ambrose	John Rawlings
January 15		Carl Erickson
February 1		Irving Penn
February 15	Betty McLauchlen	John Rawlings
March 1		Horst P. Horst
March 15	Barbara Tullgren	John Rawlings
April 1		Salvador Dalí
April 15		John Rawlings
May 1	Marilyn Ambrose	Constantin Joffé
May 15	Bettina Bolegard	Gjon Mili
June		Haanel Cassidy
July	Jean Tait	Irving Penn
August 1		John Rawlings
August 15	Betty Metcalf; Unknown	Erwin Blumenfeld
September 1	Selene Mahri	John Rawlings
September 15	Meg Mundy	Irving Penn
October 1		Constantin Joffé
October 15	Meg Mundy	John Rawlings
November 1	Adrian Storms	Erwin Blumenfeld
November 15	Meg Mundy	Irving Penn
December 1	Muriel Maxwell	John Rawlings
December 15	Selene Mahri	John Rawlings

=== 1945 ===
Issue	Cover model	Photographer
January 1	Andrea Johnson	Cecil Beaton
January 15	Muriel Maxwell	Erwin Blumenfeld
February 1		Erwin Blumenfeld
February 15	Betty McLauchlen	Horst P. Horst
March 1	Babe Paley	John Rawlings
March 15		Erwin Blumenfeld
April 1		Eugène Berman
April 15	Unknown; Andrea Johnson	John Rawlings
May		
June		Carl Erickson
July		Erwin Blumenfeld
August 1	Ann Wickham	John Rawlings
August 15		Erwin Blumenfeld
September 1		Carl Erickson
September 15		Constantin Joffé
October 1		John Rawlings
October 15	Unknown; Grace Pell	Constantin Joffé
November 1		Erwin Blumenfeld
November 15		Richard Rutledge
December 1		Erwin Blumenfeld
December 15		Carl Erickson

=== 1946 ===
Issue	Cover model	Photographer
January 1	Natalie Paine	John Rawlings
January 15		Erwin Blumenfeld
February 1		Irving Penn
February 15		Horst P. Horst
March 1	Jean Sinclair; Unknown	John Rawlings
March 15		Priscilla Peck
April 1	Dorian Leigh	Horst P. Horst
April 15		Carl Erickson
May 1		Irving Penn
May 15	Andrea Johnson	Cecil Beaton
June	Dorian Leigh	John Rawlings
July		Irving Penn
August 1	Babe Paley	Erwin Blumenfeld
August 15	Mary Tice	Irving Penn
September 1	Dorothy Tivis	Horst P. Horst
September 15	Dorian Leigh	Irving Penn
October 1	Dorian Leigh	Horst P. Horst
October 15	Lily Carlson	Erwin Blumenfeld
November 1		Horst P. Horst
November 15		Salvador Dalí
December 1		Salvador Dalí
December 15	Dorian Leigh; Ray Bolger	Irving Penn

=== 1947 ===
Issue	Cover model	Photographer
January 1		Carl Erickson
January 15		Richard Rutledge
February 1		
February 15	Barbara Tullgren	Horst P. Horst
March 1		René Bouché
March 15	Meg Mundy	Horst P. Horst
April 1		Dagmar Freuchen-Gale
April 15		Irving Penn
May 1		Irving Penn
May 15		Eugène Berman
June 1	Kay Hernan	John Rawlings
June 15	Joan Pedersen	René Bouché
July 1	Joan Pedersen	Richard Rutledge
July 15	—N/a	René Bouët-Willaumez
August 1		Erwin Blumenfeld
August 15	Joan Petit	Frances McLaughlin-Gill
September 1	Joan Pedersen	Irving Penn
September 15	Kitty Kopet	Richard Rutledge
October 1	—N/a	René Bouché
October 15	Carmen Dell'Orefice	Erwin Blumenfeld
November 1	—N/a	René Bouché
November 15	—N/a	Richard Rutledge
December	—N/a	Richard de Menocal

=== 1948 ===
Issue	Cover model	Photographer
January	Joan Petit	Herbert Matter
February 1	—N/a	
February 15	Betty Threat	Horst P. Horst
March 1	Ricki Van Dusen	Irving Penn
March 15	Ernesta Beaux	Cecil Beaton
April 1		Horst P. Horst
April 15	Dorothy Griffith	John Rawlings
May 1	Carmen Dell'Orefice	Herbert Matter
May 15	—N/a	Irving Penn
June	Dorian Leigh	John Rawlings
July	—N/a	Irving Penn
August 1	Sandra Lane	Erwin Blumenfeld
August 15	Dolores Dalzell	Irving Penn
September 1	Jean Patchett	Serge Balkin
September 15	Sandra Lane	Erwin Blumenfeld
October 1	—N/a	Carl Erickson
October 15	Elise Carlson	Erwin Blumenfeld
November 1	Carmen Dell'Orefice	John Rawlings
November 15	Barbara Mullen	John Rawlings
December	—N/a	Eugene Berman

=== 1949 ===
Issue	Cover model	Photographer
January	Evelyn Tripp	Erwin Blumenfeld
February 1	—N/a	
February 15		Erwin Blumenfeld
March 1	—N/a	Marcel Vertès
March 15	Tedi Thurman	Arik Nepo
April 1	Jean Patchett; Carmen Dell'Orefice	Cecil Beaton
April 15	—N/a	Irving Penn
May 1	Ruth Knowles	Irving Penn
May 15		Serge Balkin
June	Katherine Cassidy	Erwin Blumenfeld
July	—N/a	Marcel Vertès
August 1	Sue Jenks	John Rawlings
August 15	Sue Jenks	John Rawlings
September 1	Mary Jane Russell	Frances McLaughlin-Gill
September 15	—N/a	René Gruau
October 1	Wenda Parkinson	Norman Parkinson
October 15	Dorothy Tivis	Erwin Blumenfeld
November 1	Lisa Fonssagrives	Irving Penn
November 15	Jean Patchett	Irving Penn
December	Mary Jane Russell	Horst P. Horst

== 1950s ==
=== 1950 ===
Issue	Cover model	Photographer
January	Jean Patchett	Erwin Blumenfeld
February 1	—N/a	
February 15	Bettina Graziani	Richard Rutledge
March 1	Jean Patchett	Irving Penn
March 15	Elise Carlson	Erwin Blumenfeld
April 1	Jean Patchett	Irving Penn
April 15	Maxime de la Falaise	Horst P. Horst
May 1	Lisa Fonssagrives	John Rawlings
May 15	Dorian Leigh	Horst P. Horst
June	Jean Patchett	Horst P. Horst
July	Jean Patchett	Irving Penn
August 1	Eva Gerney	Erwin Blumenfeld
August 15	Bettina Graziani	Irving Penn
September 1	Dovima	Horst P. Horst
September 15	Sue Jenks	Erwin Blumenfeld
October 1	Margot Smyly	Horst P. Horst
October 15	Jean Patchett	Horst P. Horst
November 1	Kathy Dennis	Norman Parkinson
November 15	—N/a	Herbert Matter
December	Lisa Fonssagrives	Irving Penn

=== 1951 ===
Issue	Cover model	Photographer
January	Lillian Marcuson	Erwin Blumenfeld
February 1	—N/a	
February 15	Jean Patchett	Irving Penn
March 1	Martita	Erwin Blumenfeld
March 15	—N/a	Richard Rutledge
April 1	Babe Paley	Irving Penn
April 15	Jean Patchett	Clifford Coffin
May 1	Carmen Dell'Orefice	Richard Rutledge
May 15	Nina de Voogt	Irving Penn
June	Anne St. Marie	Erwin Blumenfeld
July	Jean Patchett	Clifford Coffin
August 1	Lisa Fonssagrives	Irving Penn
August 15		Richard Rutledge
September 1	Lisa Fonssagrives	Irving Penn
September 15	Jean Patchett	Horst P. Horst
October 1	Evelyn Tripp	Richard Rutledge
October 15	Lisa Fonssagrives	Clifford Coffin
November 1	Janet Randy	Clifford Coffin
November 15	Della Oake	Cecil Beaton
December		Erwin Blumenfeld

=== 1952 ===
Issue	Cover model	Photographer
January	Suzy Parker	Erwin Blumenfeld
February 1	—N/a	
February 15	Janet Randy	Clifford Coffin
March 1		Richard Rutledge
March 15	Suzy Parker	Richard Rutledge
April 1	Sue Jenks	Roger Prigent
April 15	Suzy Parker	John Rawlings
May 1	Lisa Fonssagrives	Irving Penn
May 15	Suzy Parker	Irving Penn
June	Dovima	Richard Rutledge
July	Ruth Neumann	Irving Penn
August 1	Dovima	Roger Prigent
August 15	Ruth Neumann	Richard Rutledge
September 1	Suzy Parker	Roger Prigent
September 15	Wenda Parkinson	Irving Penn
October 1	Barbara Mullen	Horst P. Horst
October 15	Victoria von Hagen	Erwin Blumenfeld
November 1	Myrtle Crawford	Frances McLaughlin-Gill
November 15	Suzy Parker	Horst P. Horst
December	Sunny Harnett	Clifford Coffin

=== 1953 ===
Issue	Cover model	Photographer
January	Nelly Nyad	Erwin Blumenfeld
February 1	—N/a	
February 15	Nina de Voogt	Erwin Blumenfeld
March 1	Dovima	Erwin Blumenfeld
March 15	Mary Jane Russell	Erwin Blumenfeld
April 1	Evelyn Tripp	Erwin Blumenfeld
April 15	Mary Jane Russell	Erwin Blumenfeld
May 1	Nancy Berg	Erwin Blumenfeld
May 15	Cherry Nelms; Bob Taft	Erwin Blumenfeld
June	Mary Jane Russell	Horst P. Horst
July	Liz Pringle	John Rawlings
August 1		Erwin Blumenfeld
August 15	Nancy Berg	Erwin Blumenfeld
September 1	Dovima	Horst P. Horst
September 15	Cherry Nelms	Horst P. Horst
October 1	Jean Patchett	Horst P. Horst
October 15		Horst P. Horst
November 1	—N/a	René Bouché
November 15	Mary Jane Russell	Clifford Coffin
December	Kathleen Wallace	Erwin Blumenfeld

=== 1954 ===
Issue	Cover model	Photographer
January	Nancy Berg	Erwin Blumenfeld
February 1	—N/a	
February 15	Nina de Voogt	Erwin Blumenfeld
March 1	Mary Jane Russell; Cherry Nelms	Richard Rutledge
March 15	Fern Tailer	Erwin Blumenfeld
April 1	Veronica Von Hagen	Erwin Blumenfeld
April 15	Ricki VanDusen	Karen Radkai
May 1	Dovima	Erwin Blumenfeld
May 15	Jean Patchett	Erwin Blumenfeld
June	Evelyn Tripp	Clifford Coffin
July	Anne Gunning	Karen Radkai
August 1	Leonie Vernet	Richard Rutledge
August 15	Anne Gunning	Frances McLaughlin-Gill
September 1	Evelyn Tripp	Erwin Blumenfeld
September 15	Dovima	Horst P. Horst
October 1	Jean Patchett	Horst P. Horst
October 15	Nancy Berg	Erwin Blumenfeld
November 1	Nancy Berg	Clifford Coffin
November 15	Mary Jane Russell	Horst P. Horst
December	Elsa Martinelli	Clifford Coffin

=== 1955 ===
Issue	Cover model	Photographer
January	Anne St. Marie	Erwin Blumenfeld
February 1	—N/a	
February 15	Anne St. Marie	Erwin Blumenfeld
March 1	Mary Jane Russell	Richard Rutledge
March 15	Sunny Harnett	John Rawlings
April 1	Mary Jane Russell	Horst P. Horst
April 15	Charlotte Payne	Horst P. Horst
May 1		Horst P. Horst
May 15	Suzy Parker	Irving Penn
June	Anne St. Marie	Irving Penn
July		John Rawlings
August 1	Unknown; Leonie Vernet	Roger Prigent
August 15	Barbara Mullen	Clifford Coffin
September 1	Renée Breton	Henry Clarke
September 15	Mary Jane Russell	Richard Rutledge
October 1	Barbara Mullen	Irving Penn
October 15	Anne St. Marie	Richard Rutledge
November 1	Anne St. Marie	Henry Clarke
November 15	Anne St. Marie	Henry Clarke
December	Mary Jane Russell	Richard Rutledge

=== 1956 ===
Issue	Cover model	Photographer
January	Anne St. Marie	Frances McLaughlin-Gill
February 1	Evelyn Tripp	Karen Radkai
February 15	Sunny Harnett	Karen Radkai
March 1	Anne St. Marie	Richard Rutledge
March 15	Evelyn Tripp	Karen Radkai
April 1	Sunny Harnett	Irving Penn
April 15	Joan Friedman; Evelyn Tripp	Karen Radkai
May 1	Lucinda Hollingsworth	Karen Radkai
May 15	Anne St. Marie	Irving Penn
June	Anne St. Marie	Irving Penn
July	Patsy Shally	Irving Penn
August 1	Margo Moore	Richard Rutledge
August 15	Va Taylor	Frances McLaughlin-Gill
September 1	Joan Friedman	Irving Penn
September 15	Lucinda Hollingsworth	Karen Radkai
October 1	Joanna McCormick	Karen Radkai
October 15	Va Taylor	Karen Radkai
November 1	Joanna McCormick	Richard Rutledge
November 15	Lucinda Hollingsworth	Clifford Coffin
December	Dina Merrill	John Rawlings

=== 1957 ===
Issue	Cover model	Photographer
January 1	Romaine Simenson	Karen Radkai
January 15	Millie Perkins	Karen Radkai
February 1	Joanna McCormick	Irving Penn
February 15	Anne St. Marie	Karen Radkai
March 1	Joan Friedman	Clifford Coffin
March 15	Jessica Ford	Karen Radkai
April 1	Joanna McCormick	Karen Radkai
April 15		Richard Rutledge
May	Ann Klem	Irving Penn
June	Joanna McCormick	Irving Penn
July	Joanna McCormick	Karen Radkai
August 1	Mary McLaughlin	Horst P. Horst
August 15	Christa Vogel	Horst P. Horst
September 1	Anne St. Marie	Irving Penn
September 15	Mary Jane Russell	John Rawlings
October 1	Mary McLaughlin	William Klein
October 15		John Rawlings
November 1	Va Taylor	John Rawlings
November 15	Mary McLaughlin	Leombruno-Bodi
December	Gyongyi Armstrong	Karen Radkai

=== 1958 ===
Issue	Cover model	Photographer
January 1	Jessica Ford	Leombruno-Bodi
January 15	Marie-Hélène Arnaud	Karen Radkai
February 1	—N/a	
February 15		Richard Rutledge
March 1	Anne St. Marie	Irving Penn
March 15	Nina de Voogt	René Bouché
April 1	Mary Jane Russell	Irving Penn
April 15	Isabella Albonico	René Bouché
May	Anne St. Marie	Karen Radkai
June	Dolores Hawkins	Jerry Schatzberg
July	Anne St. Marie	Irving Penn
August 1	Mary Hilem	Henry Clarke
August 15	Anna Carin Bjorck	Sante Forlano
September 1	Monique Chevalier	Henry Clarke
September 15	Monique Chevalier	Irving Penn
October 1	—N/a	Richard Rutledge
October 15	Anna Carin Bjorck	John Rawlings
November 1	Suzy Parker	Karen Radkai
November 15	Monique Chevalier	Richard Rutledge
December	Anne St. Marie	William Bell

=== 1959 ===
Issue	Cover model	Photographer
January 1	Joanna McCormick	Karen Radkai
January 15	Dolores Hawkins	William Bell
February 1	Lucinda Hollingsworth	Karen Radkai
February 15	Betsy Pickering; Anne St. Marie; Dovima; Sunny Harnett; Evelyn Tripp	William Bell
March 1	Isabella Albonico	Irving Penn
March 15	Paule Rizzo	Henry Clarke
April 1	Anne St. Marie	Tom Palumbo
April 15	Sara Thom	Richard Rutledge
May	Dolores Hawkins	William Bell
June	Gitta Schilling	Karen Radkai
July	Jane Fonda	Irving Penn
August 1	Isabella Albonico	John Rawlings
August 15	Brooke Hayward	Horst P. Horst
September 1	Morris	Karen Radkai
September 15	Nena von Schlebrügge	John Rawlings
October 1	Monique Chevalier	Irving Penn
October 15	Isabella Albonico	Irving Penn
November 1	Sara Thom	John Rawlings
November 15	Lilly Mor Roy	Evelyn Hofer
December	Lisa Bigelow	Sante Forlano

== 1960s ==
=== 1960 ===
Issue	Cover model	Photographer
January 1	Jane Fonda	Irving Penn
January 15	Sara Thom	Irving Penn
February 1	Anna Carin Bjorck	Jerry Schatzberg
February 15	Katherine Pastrie	Irving Penn
March 1	Sondra Peterson	Karen Radkai
March 15	Lisa Bigelow	Horst P. Horst
April 1	Isabella Albonico	John Rawlings
April 15	Dorothy McGowan	Leombruno-Bodi
May	Dorothy McGowan	Leombruno-Bodi
June	LeFerre	Karen Radkai
July	Sondra Peterson	Karen Radkai
August 1	Pia Rossilli Kazan	Karen Radkai
August 15	Margo McKendry	Leombruno-Bodi
September 1	Anna Carin Bjorck	Irving Penn
September 15	Isabella Albonico	Tom Palumbo
October 1	Dorothy McGowan	Irving Penn
October 15	Angela Howard	Tom Palumbo
November 1	Dorothy McGowan	Irving Penn
November 15	Deborah Dixon	Bert Stern
December	Marola Witt	Irving Penn

=== 1961 ===
Issue	Cover model	Photographer
January 1	Dorothy McGowan	Irving Penn
January 15	Dorothy McGowan	Frances McLaughlin-Gill
February 1	Dorothy McGowan	Herbert Matter
February 15	Pia Rossilli Kazan	Bruce Davidson
March 1	Isabella Albonico	Irving Penn
March 15	Isabella Albonico	Irving Penn
April 1	Sondra Peterson	William Klein
April 15	Isabella Albonico	William Klein
May	Collage; Sophia Loren (Eyes & Mouth); Anne St. Marie (Inset)	
June	Dorothy McGowan	Tom Palumbo
July	Deborah Dixon	Bert Stern
August 1	Monique Chevallier	John Rawlings
August 15	Sondra Peterson	Karen Radkai
September 1	Dorothy McGowan	Bert Stern
September 15	Dorothy McGowan	Irving Penn
October 1	Dorothy McGowan	Irving Penn
October 15	Dorothy McGowan	Irving Penn
November 1	Sondra Peterson	Horst P. Horst
November 15	Sondra Peterson	Horst P. Horst
December	Antonia Boekestyn	Horst P. Horst

=== 1962 ===
Issue	Cover model	Photographer
January 1	Anne de Zogheb	Karen Radkai
January 15	Wilhelmina Cooper	Karen Radkai
February 1	Wilhelmina Cooper	Karen Radkai
February 15	Nena von Schlebrügge	Tom Palumbo
March 1	Dorothy McGowan	Bert Stern
March 15	Gillis McGil	Art Kane
April 1	Tamara Nyman	Irving Penn
April 15	Dorothy McGowan	Bert Stern
May	Isabella Albonico	Bert Stern
June	Ina Balke	Irving Penn
July	Anne De Zogheb	Bert Stern
August 1	Tilly Tizzani	Irving Penn
August 15	Wilhelmina Cooper	Gene Laurents
September 1	Kecia Nyman	Art Kane
September 15		Irving Penn
October 1	Tilly Tizzani	Bert Stern
October 15	Monique Chevallier	William Klein
November 1	Sophia Loren	Bert Stern
November 15	Sondra Peterson	Irving Penn
December	Sondra Peterson	Irving Penn

=== 1963 ===
Issue	Cover model	Photographer
January 1	Wilhelmina Cooper	Irving Penn
January 15	Sandra Paul	Irving Penn
February 1	Wilhelmina Cooper	Irving Penn
February 15	Anne De Zogheb	Irving Penn
March 1	Anne De Zogheb	Irving Penn
March 15	Wilhelmina Cooper	Irving Penn
April 1	Jean Shrimpton	William Klein
April 15	Jean Shrimpton	William Klein
May	Wilhelmina Cooper	Irving Penn
June	Celia Hammond	Horst P. Horst
July	Celia Hammond	Irving Penn
August 1	Wilhelmina Cooper	Irving Penn
August 15	Wilhelmina Cooper	Bert Stern
September 1	Jean Shrimpton	Bert Stern
September 15	Brigitte Bauer	David Bailey
October 1	Brigitte Bauer	Bert Stern
October 15	Brigitte Bauer	David Bailey
November 1	Jean Shrimpton	Irving Penn
November 15	Jean Shrimpton	Irving Penn
December	Sandra Paul	Bert Stern

=== 1964 ===
Issue	Cover model	Photographer
January 1	Sandra Paul	Irving Penn
January 15	Wilhelmina Cooper	Bert Stern
February 1	Wilhelmina Cooper	Bert Stern
February 15	Brigitte Bauer	Irving Penn
March 1	Sandra Paul	Bert Stern
March 15	Brigitte Bauer	Bert Stern
April 1	Brigitte Bauer	Irving Penn
April 15	Brigitte Bauer	Irving Penn
May	Wilhelmina Cooper	Irving Penn
June	Anne de Zogheb	Irving Penn
July	Sondra Peterson	Irving Penn
August 1	Jean Shrimpton	Irving Penn
August 15	Brigitte Bauer	Irving Penn
September 1	Wilhelmina Cooper	David Bailey
September 15	Veronica Hamel	Irving Penn
October 1	Wilhelmina Cooper	Irving Penn
October 15	Veruschka	Irving Penn
November 1	Audrey Hepburn	Irving Penn
November 15	Astrid Heeren	Irving Penn
December	Rosemarie Zander	Bert Stern

=== 1965 ===
Issue	Cover model	Photographer
January 1	Brigitte Bauer	Irving Penn
January 15	Veruschka	Irving Penn
February 15	Brigitte Bauer	Bert Stern
March 1	Wilhelmina Cooper	Irving Penn
March 15	Veruschka	Irving Penn
April 1	Wilhelmina Cooper	Irving Penn
April 15	Brigitte Bauer	William Klein
May	Veruschka	Irving Penn
June	Brigitte Bauer	Irving Penn
July	Veruschka	Irving Penn
August 1	Samantha Eggar	Bert Stern
August 15	Veruschka	Irving Penn
September 1	Marisa Berenson	Irving Penn
September 15	Kecia Nyman	Irving Penn
October 1	Marisa Berenson	Irving Penn
October 15	Marisa Berenson	Irving Penn
November 1	Brigitte Bauer	Irving Penn
November 15	Brigitte Bauer	Bert Stern
December	Wilhelmina Cooper	Irving Penn

=== 1966 ===
Issue	Cover model	Photographer
January 1	Celia Hammond	Irving Penn
January 15	Marisa Berenson	Irving Penn
February 1	Marisa Berenson	Irving Penn
February 15	Veruschka	Irving Penn
March 1	Mirella Petteni	Irving Penn
March 15	Barbra Streisand	Richard Avedon
April 1	Brigitte Bauer	Irving Penn
April 15	Brigitte Bauer	Richard Avedon
May	Birgitta af Klerker	Bert Stern
June	Jean Shrimpton	Irving Penn
July	Barbara Bach	Richard Avedon
August 1	Celia Hammond	Norman Parkinson
August 15	Brigitte Bauer	Irving Penn
September 1	Veruschka	Irving Penn
September 15	Brigitte Bauer	Richard Avedon
October 1	Celia Hammond	David Bailey
October 15	Jean Shrimpton	Richard Avedon
November 1	Veruschka	Richard Avedon
November 15	Lauren Hutton	Bert Stern
December	Evelyn Kuhn	Irving Penn

=== 1967 ===
Issue	Cover model	Photographer
January 1	Samantha Jones	Irving Penn
January 15	Evelyn Kuhn	Irving Penn
February 1	Samantha Jones	Irving Penn
February 15	Lauren Hutton	Bert Stern
March 1	Samantha Jones	Irving Penn
March 15	Lauren Hutton	Irving Penn
April 1	Celia Hammond	Bert Stern
April 15	Twiggy	Bert Stern
May	Candice Bergen	Bert Stern
June	Andrea Rambaldi	David Bailey
July	Twiggy	Richard Avedon
August 1	Twiggy	Richard Avedon
August 15	Mia Farrow	David Bailey
September 1	Jean Shrimpton	David Bailey
September 15	Heide Wiedeck	David Bailey
October 1	Jean Shrimpton	Richard Avedon
October 15	Jennifer O'Neill	David Bailey
November 1	Sue Murray	Irving Penn
November 15	Twiggy	Bert Stern
December	Jean Shrimpton	Irving Penn

=== 1968 ===
Issue	Cover model	Photographer
January 1	Sue Murray	Bert Stern
January 15	Lauren Hutton	Gianni Penati
February 1	Jean Shrimpton	Irving Penn
February 15	Jean Shrimpton	Irving Penn
March 1	Sue Murray	Irving Penn
March 15	Sue Murray	Irving Penn
April 1	Veruschka	Irving Penn
April 15	Jean Shrimpton	Richard Avedon
May	Katharine Ross	Bert Stern
June	Lauren Hutton	Irving Penn
July	Lauren Hutton	Irving Penn
August 1	Joanna Shimkus	David Bailey
August 15	Lauren Hutton	Gianni Penati
September 1	Veruschka	Irving Penn
September 15	Françoise Rubartelli	Irving Penn
October 1	Windsor Elliott	Arnaud de Rosnay
October 15	Windsor Elliott	Gianni Penati
November 1	Françoise Rubartelli	Irving Penn
November 15	Veruschka	Irving Penn
December	Lauren Hutton	Irving Penn

=== 1969 ===
Issue	Cover model	Photographer
January 1	Lauren Hutton	Irving Penn
January 15	Veruschka	Franco Rubartelli
February 1	Candice Bergen	Bert Stern
February 15	Evelyn Kuhn	Irving Penn
March 1	Sue Murray	Irving Penn
March 15	Jean Shrimpton	Gianni Penati
April 1	Suzy Kendall	David Bailey
April 15	Britt Ekland	Gianni Penati
May	Windsor Elliott	Irving Penn
June	Windsor Elliott	Arnaud de Rosnay
July	Susanne Schöneborn	John Cowan
August 1	Jacqueline Bisset	Bert Stern
August 15	Goldie Hawn	Irving Penn
September 1	Ulla Bomser	Gianni Penati
September 15	Susanne Schöneborn	Gianni Penati
October 1	Jean Shrimpton	Bert Stern
October 15	Susanne Schöneborn	Irving Penn
November 1	Susanne Schöneborn	Irving Penn
November 15	Françoise Rubartelli	Irving Penn
December	Susanne Schöneborn	Irving Penn

== 1970s ==
=== 1970 ===
Issue	Cover model	Photographer
January 1	Jane Birkin	John Cowan
January 15	Charly Stember	Irving Penn
February 1	Charly Stember	Irving Penn
February 15	Lynne Sutherland	Bert Stern
March 1	Ali MacGraw	Bert Stern
March 15	Lauren Hutton	Irving Penn
April 1	Jean Shrimpton	Richard Avedon
April 15	Susanne Schöneborn	Arnaud de Rosnay
May	Pilar Crespi	Bert Stern
June	Karen Graham	Bert Stern
July	Jean Shrimpton	David Bailey
August 1	Gunilla Lindblad	David Bailey
August 15	Karen Graham	Bert Stern
September 1	Lauren Hutton	Irving Penn
September 15	Ann Turkel	David Bailey
October 1	Karen Graham	Gianni Penati
October 15	Karen Graham	Bert Stern
November 1	Gunilla Lindblad	Jean-Pierre Zachariasen
November 15	Susanne Schöneborn	Gianni Penati
December	Sophia Loren	Richard Avedon

=== 1971 ===
Issue	Cover model	Photographer
January 1	Lauren Hutton	Arnaud de Rosnay
January 15	Catherine Jourdan	Arnaud de Rosnay
February 1	Catherine Deneuve	Just Jaeckin
February 15	Susan Forristal	Richard Avedon
March 1	Jean Shrimpton	Richard Avedon
March 15	Goldie Hawn	Richard Avedon
April 1	Charly Stember	Richard Avedon
April 15	Elizabeth Taylor	Lord Snowdon
May	Lauren Hutton	Richard Avedon
June	Gunilla Lindblad	Irving Penn
July	Patricia Dow	Gianni Penati
August 1	Patricia Dow	Gianni Pennati
August 15	Donna Mitchell	Richard Avedon
September 1	Patricia Dow	David Bailey
September 15	Jean Shrimpton	David Bailey
October 1	Donna Mitchell	Richard Avedon
October 15	Karen Graham	David Bailey
November 1	Karen Graham	Irving Penn
November 15	Patricia Dow	Gianni Penati
December	Grace Kelly	Richard Avedon

=== 1972 ===
Issue	Cover model	Photographer
January 1	Lauren Hutton	Richard Avedon
January 15	Lynn Woodruff	Gianni Penati
February 1	Karen Graham	David Bailey
February 15	Gunilla Lindblad	Helmut Newton
March 1	Cybill Shepherd	Irving Penn
March 15	Karen Graham	Gianni Penati
April 1	Cher	Richard Avedon
April 15	Sophia Loren	Henry Clarke
May	Karen Graham	Irving Penn
June	Karen Graham	Richard Avedon
July	Karen Graham	Richard Avedon
August 1	Susanne Schöneborn	Richard Avedon
August 15	Lauren Hutton	Richard Avedon
September 1	Karen Graham	Irving Penn
September 15	Karen Graham	Richard Avedon
October 1	Karen Graham	Richard Avedon
October 15	Susanne Schöneborn	Kourken Pakchanian
November 1	Apollonia van Ravenstein	Richard Avedon
November 15	Raquel Welch	Henry Clarke
December	Cher	Richard Avedon

=== 1973 ===
Issue	Cover model	Photographer
January	Lauren Hutton	Richard Avedon
February	Karen Graham	Bob Stone
March	Lauren Hutton	Richard Avedon
April	Karen Graham	Kourken Pakchanian
May	Raquel Welch	Richard Avedon
June	Lauren Hutton	Richard Avedon
July	Karen Graham	Richard Avedon
August	Lauren Hutton	Richard Avedon
September	Karen Graham	Richard Avedon
October	Lauren Hutton	Richard Avedon
November	Cybill Shepherd	Helmut Newton
December	Jacqueline Bisset	Richard Avedon

=== 1974 ===
Issue	Cover model	Photographer
January	Lauren Hutton	Francesco Scavullo
February	Karen Graham	Francesco Scavullo
March	Pola	Francesco Scavullo
April	Rene Russo	Richard Avedon
May	Cher	Chris von Wangenheim
June	Lauren Hutton	Richard Avedon
July	Rene Russo	Francesco Scavullo
August	Beverly Johnson	Francesco Scavullo
September	Lauren Hutton	Richard Avedon
October	Rene Russo	Francesco Scavullo
November	Cher	Richard Avedon
December	Lisa Taylor	Francesco Scavullo

=== 1975 ===
Issue	Cover model	Photographer
January	Lauren Hutton	Francesco Scavullo
February	Cher	Richard Avedon
March	Margaux Hemingway	Richard Avedon
April	Rene Russo	Francesco Scavullo
May	Lisa Taylor	Francesco Scavullo
June	Beverly Johnson	Francesco Scavullo
July	Rene Russo	Francesco Scavullo
August	Rosie Vela	Arthur Elgort
September	Lauren Hutton	Francesco Scavullo
October	Rosie Vela	Irving Penn
November	Patti Hansen	Francesco Scavullo
December	Karen Graham	Francesco Scavullo

=== 1976 ===
Issue	Cover model	Photographer
January	Patti Hansen	Arthur Elgort
February	Rosie Vela	Arthur Elgort
March	Rene Russo	Francesco Scavullo
April	Rosie Vela	Francesco Scavullo
May	Rene Russo	Francesco Scavullo
June	Patti Hansen	Francesco Scavullo
July	Rene Russo	Arthur Elgort
August	Rosie Vela	Arthur Elgort
September	Patti Hansen	Francesco Scavullo
October	Jacqueline Bisset	Chris von Wangenheim
November	Rosie Vela	Arthur Elgort
December	Lisa Cooper	Arthur Elgort

=== 1977 ===
Issue	Cover model	Photographer
January	Rosie Vela	Arthur Elgort
February	Patti Hansen	Albert Watson
March	Patti Hansen	Arthur Elgort
April	Farrah Fawcett	Richard Avedon
May	Rosie Vela	Arthur Elgort
June	Lisa Taylor	Albert Watson
July	Patti Hansen	Arthur Elgort
August	Peggy Dillard	Albert Watson
September	Patti Hansen	Patrick Demarchelier
October	Rosie Vela	Arthur Elgort
November	Rene Russo	Patrick Demarchelier
December	Patti Hansen	Patrick Demarchelier

=== 1978 ===
Issue	Cover model	Photographer
January	Rosie Vela	Albert Watson
February	Patti Hansen	Albert Watson
March	Jacqueline Bisset	Richard Avedon
April	Patti Hansen	Francesco Scavullo
May	Patti Hansen	Francesco Scavullo
June	Rosie Vela	Richard Avedon
July	Farrah Fawcett	Patrick Demarchelier
August	Peggy Dillard	Albert Watson
September	Rosie Vela	Arthur Elgort
October	Michelle Stevens	Arthur Elgort
November	Michelle Stevens	Arthur Elgort
December	Rosie Vela	Albert Watson

=== 1979 ===
Issue	Cover model	Photographer
January	Peggy Dillard	Albert Watson
February	Jaclyn Smith	Richard Avedon
March	Nancy Donahue	Stan Shaffer
April	Esmé Marshall	Stan Shaffer
May	Michelle Stevens	Stan Shaffer
June	Kelly Emberg	Patrick Demarchelier
July	Esmé Marshall	Patrick Demarchelier
August	Kim Alexis	Patrick Demarchelier
September	Kelly Emberg	John Stember
October	Kim Alexis	John Stember
November	Kim Alexis	Stan Malinowski
December	Kim Alexis	John Stember

== 1980s ==
=== 1980 ===
Issue	Cover model	Photographer
January	Nancy Donahue	John Stember
February	Brooke Shields	Richard Avedon
March	Sheila Johnson	Patrick Demarchelier
April	Eva Voorhees	Richard Avedon
May	Nastassja Kinski	Richard Avedon
June	Kim Alexis	Francesco Scavullo
July	Nancy Donahue	Richard Avedon
August	Gia Carangi	Richard Avedon
September	Kim Alexis	Richard Avedon
October	Brooke Shields	Richard Avedon
November	Kim Alexis	Richard Avedon
December	Brooke Shields	Richard Avedon

=== 1981 ===
Issue	Cover model	Photographer
January	Beverly Johnson	Richard Avedon
February	Kim Alexis	Richard Avedon
March	Carol Alt	Richard Avedon
April	Kim Alexis	Richard Avedon
May	Brooke Shields	Richard Avedon
June	Kim Alexis	Richard Avedon
July	Kelly Emberg	Richard Avedon
August	Kelly Emberg	Richard Avedon
September	Brooke Shields	Richard Avedon
October	Nastassja Kinski	Richard Avedon
November	Kim Alexis	Richard Avedon
December	Kelly LeBrock	Richard Avedon

=== 1982 ===
Issue	Cover model	Photographer
January	Rosemary McGrotha	Richard Avedon
February	Mariel Hemingway	Bill King
March	Isabella Rossellini	Bill King
April	Rosemary McGrotha	Richard Avedon
May	Nastassja Kinski	Richard Avedon
June	Kelly Emberg	Richard Avedon
July	Nastassja Kinski	Richard Avedon
August	Brooke Shields	Richard Avedon
September	Isabella Rossellini	Richard Avedon
October	Isabella Rossellini	Richard Avedon
November	Isabella Rossellini	Richard Avedon
December	Shari Belafonte	Richard Avedon

=== 1983 ===
Issue	Cover model	Photographer
January	Lauren Helm	Richard Avedon
February	Alexa Singer	Richard Avedon
March	Lauren Helm	Richard Avedon
April	Renée Simonsen	Richard Avedon
May	Lauren Helm	Richard Avedon
June	Alexa Singer	Richard Avedon
July	Nastassja Kinski	Richard Avedon
August	Isabella Rossellini	Richard Avedon
September	Renée Simonsen	Richard Avedon
October	Brooke Shields	Denis Piel
November	Brooke Shields	Richard Avedon
December	Isabella Rossellini	Richard Avedon

=== 1984 ===
Issue	Cover model	Photographer
January	Jacki Adams	Denis Piel
February	Shari Belafonte	Richard Avedon
March	Beth Rupert	Richard Avedon
April	Renée Simonsen	Richard Avedon
May	Brooke Shields	Richard Avedon
June	Isabella Rossellini	Richard Avedon
July	Kim Alexis	Richard Avedon
August	Isabella Rossellini	Richard Avedon
September	Kim Alexis	Richard Avedon
October	Brooke Shields	Richard Avedon
November	Alexa Singer	Richard Avedon
December	Renée Simonsen	Richard Avedon

=== 1985 ===
Issue	Cover model	Photographer
January	Shari Belafonte	Richard Avedon
February	Brooke Shields	Richard Avedon
March	Alexa Singer	Richard Avedon
April	Kim Alexis	Richard Avedon
May	Shari Belafonte	Richard Avedon
June	Alexa Singer	Richard Avedon
July	Isabella Rossellini	Richard Avedon
August	Alexa Singer	Richard Avedon
September	Isabella Rossellini	Richard Avedon
October	Alexa Singer	Richard Avedon
November	Renée Simonsen	Richard Avedon
December	Alexa Singer	Richard Avedon

=== 1986 ===
Issue	Cover model	Photographer
January	Linda Spierings	Richard Avedon
February	Brooke Shields	Richard Avedon
March	Alexa Singer	Richard Avedon
April	Monika Schnarre	Richard Avedon
May	Paulina Porizkova	Richard Avedon
June	Shari Belafonte	Richard Avedon
July	Estelle Lefébure	Richard Avedon
August	Cindy Crawford	Richard Avedon
September	Paulina Porizkova	Richard Avedon
October	Cindy Crawford	Richard Avedon
November	Estelle Lefébure	Richard Avedon
December	Paulina Porizkova	Richard Avedon

=== 1987 ===
Issue	Cover model	Photographer
January	Cindy Crawford	Richard Avedon
February	Louise Vyent	Richard Avedon
March	Estelle Lefébure	Richard Avedon
April	Paulina Porizkova	Richard Avedon
May	Tatjana Patitz	Richard Avedon
June	Estelle Lefébure	Richard Avedon
July	Paulina Porizkova	Richard Avedon
August	Estelle Lefébure	Richard Avedon
September	Cindy Crawford	Richard Avedon
October	Rachel Williams	Richard Avedon
November	Cindy Crawford	Richard Avedon
December	Brooke Shields	Richard Avedon

=== 1988 ===
Issue	Cover model	Photographer
January	Rachel Williams	Richard Avedon
February	Cindy Crawford	Richard Avedon
March	Stephanie Seymour	Richard Avedon
April	Kara Young	Richard Avedon
May	Estelle Lefébure	Richard Avedon
June	Cathy Fedoruk	Richard Avedon
July	Susan Miner	Richard Avedon
August	Stephanie Seymour	Richard Avedon
September	Carré Otis	Richard Avedon
October	Kara Young	Richard Avedon
November	Michaela Bercu	Peter Lindbergh
December	Linda Evangelista; Carré Otis	Peter Lindbergh

=== 1989 ===
Issue	Cover model	Photographer
January	Karen Alexander	Peter Lindbergh
February	Elaine Irwin	Irving Penn
March	Carré Otis	Arthur Elgort
April	Talisa Soto	Patrick Demarchelier
May	Madonna	Patrick Demarchelier
June	Estelle Lefébure	Peter Lindbergh
July	Tatjana Patitz	Peter Lindbergh
August	Tatjana Patitz	Peter Lindbergh
September	Naomi Campbell	Patrick Demarchelier
October	Kara Young	Patrick Demarchelier
November	Michaela Bercu	Patrick Demarchelier
December	Paulina Porizkova	Patrick Demarchelier

== 1990s ==
=== 1990 ===
Issue	Cover model	Photographer
January	Tatjana Patitz	Herb Ritts
February	Cindy Crawford	Patrick Demarchelier
March	Elaine Irwin	Patrick Demarchelier
April	Christy Turlington	Patrick Demarchelier
May	Ivana Trump	Patrick Demarchelier
June	Linda Evangelista	Patrick Demarchelier
July	Cindy Crawford	Walter Chin
August	Claudia Schiffer	Patrick Demarchelier
September	Tatjana Patitz	Patrick Demarchelier
October	Cindy Crawford	Patrick Demarchelier
November	Claudia Schiffer	Patrick Demarchelier
December	Elaine Irwin	Patrick Demarchelier

=== 1991 ===
Issue	Cover model	Photographer
January	Niki Taylor; Stephanie Roberts; Audrey Benoit	Patrick Demarchelier
February	Claudia Schiffer	Patrick Demarchelier
March	Cindy Crawford	Patrick Demarchelier
April	Judit Mascó; Niki Taylor; Karen Mulder	Patrick Demarchelier
May	Kim Basinger	Herb Ritts
June	Tatjana Patitz	Walter Chin
July	Karen Mulder	Marc Hispard
August	Karen Mulder	Patrick Demarchelier
September	Linda Evangelista	Arthur Elgort
October	Michelle Pfeiffer	Herb Ritts
November	Claudia Schiffer	Patrick Demarchelier
December	Claudia Schiffer	Patrick Demarchelier

=== 1992 ===
Issue	Cover model	Photographer
January	Cindy Crawford	Patrick Demarchelier
February	Naomi Campbell; Christy Turlington	Arthur Elgort
March	Karen Mulder	Marc Hispard
April	Claudia Schiffer; Yasmeen Ghauri; Naomi Campbell; Niki Taylor; Elaine Irwin; Tatjana Patitz; Christy Turlington; Linda Evangelista; Karen Mulder; Cindy Crawford	Patrick Demarchelier
May	Claudia Schiffer	Patrick Demarchelier
June	Claudia Schiffer	Patrick Demarchelier
July	Karen Mulder	Paul Lange
August	Christy Turlington	Arthur Elgort
September	Claudia Schiffer	Arthur Elgort
October	Madonna	Steven Meisel
November	Cindy Crawford; Richard Gere	Herb Ritts
December	Lucie de la Falaise	Steven Meisel

=== 1993 ===
Issue	Cover model	Photographer
January	Helena Christensen; Karen Mulder; Christy Turlington; Niki Taylor; Nadège du Bospertus; Beverly Peele; Meghan Douglas; Patricia Hartmann; Shalom Harlow; Claudia Mason; Lara Harris	Pierre Scherman
February	Amber Valletta	Arthur Elgort
March	Karen Mulder	Max Vadukul
April	Helena Christensen; Claudia Schiffer; Naomi Campbell; Christy Turlington; Stephanie Seymour	Herb Ritts
May	Diana, Princess of Wales	Tim Graham
June	Naomi Campbell	Steven Meisel
July	Claudia Schiffer	Steven Meisel
August	Cindy Crawford	Steven Meisel
September	Linda Evangelista	Steven Meisel
October	Winona Ryder	Herb Ritts
November	Nadja Auermann	Arthur Elgort
December	Sharon Stone	Herb Ritts

=== 1994 ===
Issue	Cover model	Photographer
January	Niki Taylor	Arthur Elgort
February	Cindy Crawford	Herb Ritts
March	Linda Evangelista	Steven Meisel
April	Bridget Hall; Brandi Quinones; Niki Taylor	Herb Ritts
May	Geena Davis	Steven Meisel
June	Julia Roberts	Herb Ritts
July	Cindy Crawford	Steven Meisel
August	Karen Mulder	Steven Meisel
September	Nadja Auermann	Steven Meisel
October	Kirsty Hume	Steven Meisel
November	Cindy Crawford	Steven Meisel
December	Claudia Schiffer	Steven Meisel

=== 1995 ===
Issue	Cover model	Photographer
January	Karen Mulder	Steven Meisel
February	Stephanie Seymour	Steven Meisel
March	Claudia Schiffer	Steven Meisel
April	Kristen McMenamy	Steven Meisel
May	Claudia Schiffer	Steven Meisel
June	Amber Valletta	Steven Meisel
July	Kate Moss	Steven Meisel
August	Linda Evangelista	Steven Meisel
September	Shalom Harlow; Amber Valletta	Steven Meisel
October	Demi Moore	Herb Ritts
November	Kirsty Hume	Steven Meisel
December	Julia Ormond	Steven Meisel

=== 1996 ===
Issue	Cover model	Photographer
January	Amber Valletta	Steven Meisel
February	Shalom Harlow	Steven Meisel
March	Claudia Schiffer	Steven Meisel
April	Lisa Marie Presley	Steven Meisel
May	Naomi Campbell; Niki Taylor	Herb Ritts
June	Kate Moss	Steven Meisel
July	Amber Valletta	Steven Meisel
August	Gwyneth Paltrow	Steven Meisel
September	Kate Moss; Amber Valletta	Steven Meisel
October	Madonna	Steven Meisel
November	Linda Evangelista	Steven Meisel
December	Winona Ryder	Steven Meisel

=== 1997 ===
Issue	Cover model	Photographer
January	Amber Valletta	Steven Meisel
February	Kirsty Hume	Steven Meisel
March	Shalom Harlow; Amber Valletta	Steven Meisel
April	Carolyn Murphy; Amber Valletta; Shalom Harlow	Steven Meisel
May	Georgina Grenville	Steven Meisel
June	Uma Thurman	Steven Meisel
July	Kiara Kabukuru	Steven Meisel
August	Georgina Grenville	Steven Meisel
September	Linda Evangelista	Steven Meisel
October	Cameron Diaz	Steven Meisel
November	Stella Tennant	Steven Meisel
December	Shalom Harlow; Georgina Grenville	Steven Meisel

=== 1998 ===
Issue	Cover model	Photographer
January	Melanie C Geri Halliwell; Emma Bunton; Mel B Victoria Beckham	Mario Testino
February	Angela Lindvall	Arthur Elgort
February	Carolyn Murphy	Steven Meisel
February	Stella Tennant	Steven Meisel
March	Kate Moss; Amber Valletta	Steven Meisel
April	Amber Valletta	Steven Meisel
May	Elizabeth Hurley	Steven Meisel
June	Sandra Bullock	Steven Meisel
July	Claire Danes	Steven Meisel
August	Carolyn Murphy	Steven Meisel
September	Renée Zellweger	Steven Meisel
October	Oprah Winfrey	Steven Meisel
November	Amber Valletta	Steven Meisel
December	Hillary Clinton	Annie Leibovitz

=== 1999 ===
Issue	Cover model	Photographer
January	Jewel	Steven Meisel
February	Stella Tennant	Steven Meisel
March	Carolyn Murphy	Steven Meisel
April	Maggie Rizer; Kate Moss	Steven Meisel
May	Carmen Kass	Steven Meisel
June	Nicole Kidman	Steven Meisel
July	Gisele Bündchen	Steven Meisel
August	Carolyn Murphy	Steven Meisel
September	Gwyneth Paltrow	Steven Meisel
October	Winona Ryder	Steven Meisel
November	Kate Moss; Gisele Bündchen; Lauren Hutton; Iman; Naomi Campbell; Stephanie Seymour; Amber Valletta; Christy Turlington; Claudia Schiffer; Lisa Taylor; Paulina Porizkova; Carolyn Murphy; Patti Hansen	Annie Leibovitz
December	Gisele Bündchen	Steven Meisel

== 2000s ==
=== 2000 ===
Issue	Cover model	Photographer
January	Gisele Bündchen; Carmen Kass	Steven Meisel
February	Angela Lindvall	Steven Meisel
March	Amber Valletta	Steven Meisel
April	Carolyn Murphy	Steven Meisel
May	Gisele Bündchen	Steven Meisel
June	Gisele Bündchen; George Clooney	Herb Ritts
July	Cate Blanchett	Steven Meisel
August	Carmen Kass	Steven Meisel
September	Bridget Hall	Steven Meisel
October	Charlize Theron	Herb Ritts
November	Carmen Kass; Angela Lindvall; Maggie Rizer; Frankie Rayder	Annie Leibovitz
December	Nicole Kidman	Annie Leibovitz

=== 2001 ===
Issue	Cover model	Photographer
January	Marion Jones	Annie Leibovitz
February	Karolína Kurková	Steven Meisel
March	Penélope Cruz	Herb Ritts
April	Renée Zellweger	Herb Ritts
May	Carmen Kass	Herb Ritts
June	Gisele Bündchen	Steven Meisel
July	Catherine Zeta-Jones	Herb Ritts
August	Amber Valletta	Steven Meisel
September	Linda Evangelista	Steven Meisel
October	Carolyn Murphy	Steven Meisel
November	Britney Spears	Herb Ritts
December	Gisele Bündchen	Steven Meisel

=== 2002 ===
Issue	Cover model	Photographer
January	Julianne Moore	Michael Thompson
February	Sarah Jessica Parker	Mario Testino
March	Gwyneth Paltrow	Herb Ritts
April	Angelina Jolie	Annie Leibovitz
May	Natalie Portman	Steven Klein
June	Ashley Judd	Mario Testino
July	Amber Valletta; Auden McCaw	Annie Leibovitz
August	Jennifer Aniston	Mario Testino
September	Kate Hudson	Herb Ritts
October	Christy Turlington	Steven Klein
November	Catherine Zeta-Jones; Renée Zellweger	Annie Leibovitz
December	Halle Berry	Annie Leibovitz

=== 2003 ===
Issue	Cover model	Photographer
January	Sandra Bullock	Steven Meisel
February	Debra Messing	Herb Ritts
March	Julianne Moore	Steven Klein
April	Brooke Shields	Annie Leibovitz
May	Cameron Diaz	Annie Leibovitz
June	Reese Witherspoon	Steven Klein
July	Demi Moore	Mario Testino
August	Sarah Jessica Parker	Steven Meisel
September	Nicole Kidman	Annie Leibovitz
October	Gwyneth Paltrow	Mario Testino
November	Uma Thurman	Annie Leibovitz
December	Renée Zellweger	Steven Klein

=== 2004 ===
Issue	Cover model	Photographer
January	Jennifer Aniston	Steven Meisel
February	Natalie Portman	Mario Testino
March	Angelina Jolie	Mario Testino
April	Gwen Stefani	Steven Meisel
May	Nicole Kidman	Irving Penn
June	Kate Hudson	Patrick Demarchelier
July	Kirsten Dunst	Mario Testino
August	Priscilla Presley; Lisa Marie Presley; Riley Keough	Annie Leibovitz
September	Daria Werbowy; Natalia Vodianova; Gisele Bündchen; Isabeli Fontana; Karolína Kurková; Liya Kebede; Hana Soukupová; Gemma Ward; Karen Elson	Steven Meisel
October	Charlize Theron	Mario Testino
November	Jennifer Connelly	Mario Testino
December	Cate Blanchett	Annie Leibovitz

=== 2005 ===
Issue	Cover model	Photographer
January	Jennifer Lopez	Mario Testino
February	Melania Trump	Mario Testino
March	Sandra Bullock	Steven Meisel
April	Drew Barrymore	Annie Leibovitz
May	Liya Kebede	Steven Meisel
June	Salma Hayek	Mario Testino
July	Kate Winslet	Mario Testino
August	Madonna	Tim Walker
September	Sarah Jessica Parker	Annie Leibovitz
October	Gwyneth Paltrow	Mario Testino
November	Reese Witherspoon	Annie Leibovitz
December	Keira Knightley	Annie Leibovitz

=== 2006 ===
Issue	Cover model	Photographer
January	Sienna Miller	Mario Testino
February	Drew Barrymore	Mario Testino
March	Natalie Portman	Craig McDean
April	Jennifer Aniston	Mario Testino
May	Keira Knightley	Mario Testino
June	Uma Thurman	Mario Testino
July	Kate Hudson	Mario Testino
August	Linda Evangelista	Steven Klein
September	Kirsten Dunst	Annie Leibovitz
October	Sandra Bullock	Steven Meisel
November	Cate Blanchett	Steven Klein
December	Nicole Kidman	Mario Testino

=== 2007 ===
Issue	Cover model	Photographer
January	Angelina Jolie	Annie Leibovitz
February	Renée Zellweger	Mario Testino
March	Jennifer Hudson	Annie Leibovitz
April	Scarlett Johansson	Craig McDean
May	Lily Donaldson; Hilary Rhoda; Doutzen Kroes; Sasha Pivovarova; Caroline Trentini; Raquel Zimmermann; Jessica Stam; Chanel Iman; Coco Rocha; Agyness Deyn	Steven Meisel
June	Keira Knightley	Arthur Elgort
July	Natalia Vodianova	Mario Testino
August	Winona Ryder	Craig McDean
September	Sienna Miller	Mario Testino
October	Charlize Theron	Mario Testino
November	Jennifer Connelly	Mario Testino
December	Penélope Cruz	Annie Leibovitz

=== 2008 ===
Issue	Cover model	Photographer
January	Kate Hudson	Patrick Demarchelier
February	Kate Bosworth	Mario Testino
March	Drew Barrymore	Steven Meisel
April	Gisele Bündchen; LeBron James	Annie Leibovitz
May	Gwyneth Paltrow	Steven Klein
June	Sarah Jessica Parker; Chris Noth	Annie Leibovitz
July	Nicole Kidman	Annie Leibovitz
August	Kate Moss	Mario Testino
September	Keira Knightley	Mario Testino
October	Rachel Weisz	Craig McDean
November	Reese Witherspoon	Mario Testino
December	Jennifer Aniston	Craig McDean

=== 2009 ===
Issue	Cover model	Photographer
January	Anne Hathaway	Mario Testino
February	Blake Lively	Mario Testino
March	Michelle Obama	Annie Leibovitz
April	Beyoncé	Mario Testino
May	Liya Kebede; Natalia Vodianova; Anna Jagodzińska; Isabeli Fontana; Lara Stone; Jourdan Dunn; Raquel Zimmermann; Caroline Trentini; Natasha Poly	Steven Meisel
June	Cameron Diaz	Mario Testino
July	Sienna Miller	Craig McDean
August	Christy Turlington	Steven Klein
September	Charlize Theron	Mario Testino
October	Michelle Williams	Mario Testino
November	Nicole Kidman; Marion Cotillard; Penélope Cruz; Kate Hudson	Annie Leibovitz
December	Cate Blanchett	Annie Leibovitz

== 2010s ==
=== 2010 ===
Issue	Cover model	Photographer
January	Rachel McAdams	Mario Testino
February	Jessica Biel	Mario Testino
March	Tina Fey	Mario Testino
April	Gisele Bündchen	Patrick Demarchelier
May	Sarah Jessica Parker	Mario Testino
June	Blake Lively	Mario Testino
July	Marion Cotillard	Mario Testino
August	Gwyneth Paltrow	Mario Testino
September	Halle Berry	Mario Testino
October	Carey Mulligan	Peter Lindbergh
November	Anne Hathaway	Mario Testino
December	Angelina Jolie	Mario Testino

=== 2011 ===
Issue	Cover model	Photographer
January	Natalie Portman	Peter Lindbergh
February	Kristen Stewart	Mario Testino
March	Lady Gaga	Mario Testino
April	Rihanna	Annie Leibovitz
May	Reese Witherspoon	Peter Lindbergh
June	Penélope Cruz	Mario Testino
July	Emma Watson	Mario Testino
August	Sarah Jessica Parker	Mario Testino
September	Kate Moss	Mario Testino
October	Michelle Williams	Annie Leibovitz
November	Rooney Mara	Mert & Marcus
December	Charlize Theron	Annie Leibovitz

=== 2012 ===
Issue	Cover model	Photographer
January	Meryl Streep	Annie Leibovitz
February	Taylor Swift	Mario Testino
March	Adele	Mert & Marcus
April	Jennifer Lopez	Mert & Marcus
May	Scarlett Johansson	Mario Testino
June	Hope Solo; Ryan Lochte; Serena Williams	Annie Leibovitz
July	Emma Stone	Mario Testino
August	Marion Cotillard	Peter Lindbergh
September	Lady Gaga	Mert & Marcus
October	Keira Knightley	Mario Testino
November	Rihanna	Annie Leibovitz
December	Anne Hathaway	Annie Leibovitz

=== 2013 ===
Issue	Cover model	Photographer
January	Gwen Stefani	Annie Leibovitz
February	Rooney Mara	David Sims
March	Beyoncé	Patrick Demarchelier
April	Michelle Obama	Annie Leibovitz
May	Carey Mulligan	Mario Testino
June	Kate Upton	Mario Testino
July	Katy Perry	Annie Leibovitz
August	Claire Danes	Annie Leibovitz
September	Jennifer Lawrence	Mario Testino
October	Sandra Bullock	Peter Lindbergh
November	Kate Winslet	Mario Testino
December	Jessica Chastain	Annie Leibovitz

=== 2014 ===
Issue	Cover model	Photographer
January	Cate Blanchett	Craig McDean
February	Lena Dunham	Annie Leibovitz
March	Rihanna	David Sims
April	Kim Kardashian; Kanye West	Annie Leibovitz
May	Emma Stone	Craig McDean
June	Charlize Theron	Mario Testino
July	Lupita Nyong'o	Mikael Jansson
August	Blake Lively	Mario Testino
September	Joan Smalls; Cara Delevingne; Karlie Kloss; Arizona Muse; Edie Campbell; Imaan Hammam; Fei Fei Sun; Vanessa Axente; Andreea Diaconu	Mario Testino
October	Reese Witherspoon	Mikael Jansson
November	Natalia Vodianova	Annie Leibovitz
December	Amy Adams	Annie Leibovitz

=== 2015 ===
Issue	Cover model	Photographer
January	Sienna Miller	Mario Testino
February	Dakota Johnson	Mario Testino
March	Karlie Kloss; Taylor Swift	Mikael Jansson
April	Serena Williams	Annie Leibovitz
May	Carey Mulligan	Mikael Jansson
June	Amanda Seyfried	Mario Testino
July	Cara Delevingne	Patrick Demarchelier
August	Nicole Kidman	Patrick Demarchelier
September	Beyoncé	Mario Testino
October	Lupita Nyong'o	Mert & Marcus
November	Angelina Jolie	Annie Leibovitz
December	Jennifer Lawrence	Mikael Jansson

=== 2016 ===
Issue	Cover model	Photographer
January	Alicia Vikander	David Sims
February	Ben Stiller; Penélope Cruz	Annie Leibovitz
March	Adele	Annie Leibovitz
April	Rihanna	Mert & Marcus
May	Taylor Swift	Mert & Marcus
June	Margot Robbie	Mert & Marcus
July	Amy Schumer	Annie Leibovitz
August	Gigi Hadid; Ashton Eaton	Mario Testino
September	Kendall Jenner	Mert & Marcus
October	Lupita Nyong'o	Mario Testino
November	Emma Stone	Mert & Marcus
December	Michelle Obama	Annie Leibovitz

=== 2017 ===
Issue	Cover model	Photographer
January	Ruth Negga	Mario Testino
February	Dakota Johnson	Patrick Demarchelier
March	Liu Wen; Ashley Graham; Kendall Jenner; Gigi Hadid; Imaan Hammam; Adwoa Aboah; Vittoria Ceretti	Inez & Vinoodh
April	Selena Gomez	Mert & Marcus
May	Katy Perry	Mert & Marcus
June	Elle Fanning	Annie Leibovitz
July	Zendaya	Mario Testino
August	Gigi Hadid; Zayn Malik	Inez & Vinoodh
September	Jennifer Lawrence	Annie Leibovitz
October	Rooney Mara	Annie Leibovitz
November	Daisy Ridley	Mario Testino
December	Meryl Streep	Annie Leibovitz

=== 2018 ===
Issue	Cover model	Photographer
January	Lupita Nyong'o	Mikael Jansson
February	Serena Williams; Alexis Olympia Ohanian	Mario Testino
March	Alicia Vikander	Steven Klein
April	Kendall Jenner	Mert & Marcus
May	Amal Clooney	Annie Leibovitz
June	Rihanna	Mert & Marcus
July	Gisele Bündchen	Inez & Vinoodh
August	Saoirse Ronan	Jamie Hawkesworth
September	Beyoncé	Tyler Mitchell
October	Lady Gaga	Inez & Vinoodh
November	Claire Foy	David Sims
December	Emily Blunt	Annie Leibovitz

=== 2019 ===
Issue	Cover model	Photographer
January	Priyanka Chopra	Annie Leibovitz
January (digital)	Priyanka Chopra, Nick Jonas	Annie Leibovitz
February	Reese Witherspoon	Zoë Ghertner
March	Justin Bieber; Hailey Bieber	Annie Leibovitz
April	Doona Bae; Scarlett Johansson; Deepika Padukone; Léa Seydoux; Adesua Etomi; Elizabeth Debicki; Angelababy	Mikael Jansson
May	Kim Kardashian West	Mikael Jansson
June	Zendaya	Tyler Mitchell
July	Margot Robbie	Inez & Vinoodh
August	Ariana Grande	Annie Leibovitz
September	Taylor Swift	Inez & Vinoodh
October	Olivia Colman	Annie Leibovitz
November	Rihanna	Ethan James Green
December	Phoebe Waller-Bridge	Ethan James Green

== 2020s ==
=== 2020 ===
Issue	Cover model	Photographer
January	Stella McCartney; Bailey Willis; Beckett Willis; Miller Willis; Reiley Willis	Annie Leibovitz
January	Ashley Graham	Annie Leibovitz
January	Greta Gerwig; Harold Baumnach	Annie Leibovitz
January	Cardi B Kulture Cephus	Annie Leibovitz
February	Florence Pugh	Daniel Jackson
March	Billie Eilish	Hassan Hajjaj
April	Ugbad Abdi; Adut Akech; Kaia Gerber; Adesuwa Aighewi; Anok Yai; Imaan Hammam; Jill Kortleve; Krini Hernández; Liu Wen; Mika Schneider; Nora Attal; Paloma Elsesser; Ros Georgiou; Fran Summers; Vittoria Ceretti	Tyler Mitchell
May	Gal Gadot	Annie Leibovitz
June/July		Irving Penn
August	Simone Biles	Annie Leibovitz
September		Jordan Casteel; Kerry James Marshall
October	Lizzo	Hype Williams
November	Naomi Campbell	Ethan James Green
December	Harry Styles	Tyler Mitchell

=== 2021 ===
Issue	Cover model	Photographer
January	Frances McDormand; Naomi Osaka; Paloma Elsesser; Rosalía	Annie Leibovitz
February	Kamala Harris	Tyler Mitchell
March	Gigi Hadid	Ethan James Green
April	Selena Gomez	Nadine Ijewere
May	Amanda Gorman	Annie Leibovitz
June/July	Kaia Gerber	Colin Dodgson
August	Jill Biden	Annie Leibovitz
September	Kaia Gerber; Anok Yai; Precious Lee; Bella Hadid; Sherry Shi; Ariel Nicholson; Yumi Nu; Lourdes Leon	Ethan James Green
October	Lorde	Théo de Gueltzl
November	Adele	Alasdair McLellan
December	Sarah Jessica Parker	Daniel Jackson

=== 2022 ===
Issue	Cover model	Photographer
January	Olivia Wilde	Annie Leibovitz
February	Hoyeon Jung	Harley Weir
March	Kim Kardashian	Carlijn Jacobs
April	Bella Hadid	Ethan James Green
May	Rihanna	Annie Leibovitz
June/July	Dua Lipa	Tyler Mitchell
August	Emma Corrin	Jamie Hawkesworth
September	Serena Williams	Luis Alberto Rodriguez
October	Jennifer Lawrence	Tina Barney
November	Michaela Coel	Malick Bodian
December	Jennifer Lopez	Annie Leibovitz

=== 2023 ===
Issue	Cover model	Photographer
January/February	Florence Pugh	Colin Dodgson
March	Erykah Badu	Jamie Hawkesworth
April	Cara Delevingne	Annie Leibovitz
May	Anok Yai; Gigi Hadid; Devon Aoki; Adut Akech; Naomi Campbell; Kendall Jenner; Natalia Vodianova; Liu Wen; Shalom Harlow; Amber Valletta	Annie Leibovitz
June/July	Margot Robbie	Ethan James Green
Summer (digital)	Sarah Jessica Parker	Bardia Zeinali
August	Olivia Rodrigo	Théo de Gueltzl
September	Linda Evangelista; Cindy Crawford; Christy Turlington; Naomi Campbell	Rafael Pavarotti
October	Kate Winslet	Annie Leibovitz
November	Carey Mulligan	Jack Davison
November (digital)	Angelina Jolie	Annie Leibovitz
December	Nicki Minaj	Norman Jean Roy

=== 2024 ===
Issue	Cover model	Photographer
Winter	Sienna Miller	Annie Leibovitz
Winter (digital)	Usher; Carolyn Murphy	Campbell Addy
March	Miuccia Prada	Steff Mitchell
April	Coco Gauff	Annie Leibovitz
May	Zendaya	Annie Leibovitz
Summer	Kendall Jenner	Mert & Marcus
August	Jill Biden	Norman Jean Roy
August (digital)	Sha’Carri Richardson	Luis Alberto Rodriguez
September	Blake Lively	Baz Luhrmann
October	Lady Gaga	Ethan James Green
October (digital)	Kamala Harris	Annie Leibovitz
November	Billie Eilish	Mikael Jansson
December	Kaia Gerber	Steven Meisel
December	Kaia Gerber	Anna Weyant
December (digital)	Angelina Kendall; Vittoria Ceretti; Amelia Gray; Lulu Tenney; Anok Yai; Devyn Garcia; Loli Bahia	Inez & Vinoodh

=== 2025 ===
Issue	Cover model	Photographer
Winter	Angel Reese	Norman Jean Roy
Winter	Gabby Thomas	Norman Jean Roy
March	Sabrina Carpenter	Steven Meisel
April	Gigi Hadid	Annie Leibovitz
May	A$AP Rocky	Tyler Mitchell
May	Colman Domingo	Iké Udé
May	Lewis Hamilton	Malick Bodian
May	Pharrell Williams	Henry Taylor
Summer	Hailey Bieber	Mikael Jansson
June (digital)	Lauren Sánchez Bezos	Tierney Gearon
August	Anne Hathaway	Annie Leibovitz
September	Emma Stone	Jamie Hawkesworth
September (digital)	Isla Johnston	Norman Jean Roy
October	Kendall Jenner; Gigi Hadid	Lachlan Bailey
November	Nicole Kidman	Carlijn Jacobs
November	Ayo Edebiri	Tyler Mitchell
November	Greta Lee	Tyler Mitchell
December	Timothée Chalamet	Annie Leibovitz
December 'Best Dressed' (digital)	Bad Bunny	Coco Capitán
December 'Best Dressed' (digital)	Alex Consani	Ethan James Green

=== 2026 ===
Issue	Cover model	Photographer
January (digital)	Amanda Seyfried	Eddie Wrey
Spring	Rosalía	Alasdair McLellan
April	Doja Cat	Willy Vanderperre
May	Anna Wintour; Meryl Streep	Annie Leibovitz
May (Digital)	Aryna Sabalenka	Steven Klein
Summer	Gracie Abrams	Larissa Hofmann
September	Kaia Gerber; Homer Gere	Steven Meisel
October	Dakota Johnson	Larissa Hofmann
October	Michael B. Jordan	Luis Alberto Rodriguez
October	Mikey Madison	Drew Vickers
November	Jenna Ortega	Szilveszter Makó

== Cover rankings ==
=== Photographers ===
as of the September 2026 issue
Rank	Photographer	Number of Covers
1	Irving Penn	167
2	Richard Avedon	148
3	Steven Meisel	97
4	Horst P. Horst	93
5	Annie Leibovitz	83
6	Mario Testino	75
7	John Rawlings	69
8	Erwin Blumenfeld	52
9	Patrick Demarchelier	42
10	Bert Stern	39

=== Cover models ===
as of the September 2026 issue
Rank	Cover Model	Number of Covers
1	Lauren Hutton	25
2	Anne St. Marie	20
2	Jean Shrimpton	20
2	Karen Graham	20
3	Brigitte Bauer	18
3	Cindy Crawford	18
4	Amber Valletta	17
4	Wilhelmina Cooper	17
5	Claudia Schiffer	16
5	Jean Patchett	16
6	Betty McLauchlen	14
6	Brooke Shields	14
6	Dorothy McGowan	14
6	Kim Alexis	14
6	Mary Jane Russell	14
7	Patti Hansen	13
7	Rosie Vela	13
7	Veruschka	13
8	Gisele Bündchen	12
8	Linda Evangelista	12
9	Lisa Fonssagrives	11
10	Christy Turlington	10
10	Isabella Albonico	10
10	Isabella Rossellini	10
10	Karen Mulder	10
10	Meg Mundy	10
10	Muriel Maxwell	10
10	Naomi Campbell	10
