= Selene Mahri =

Finnish model (1924–2020)

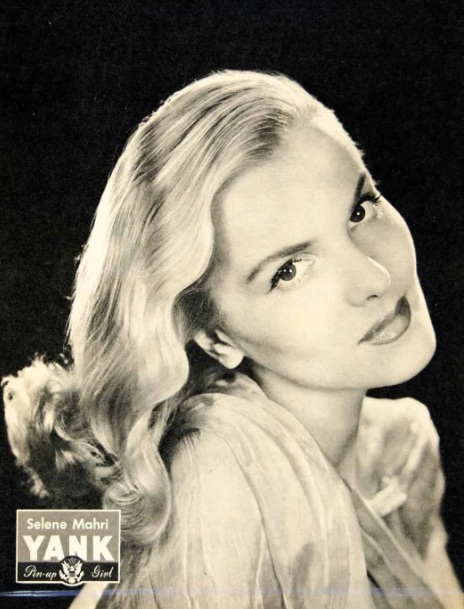
- Mahri pin-up in Yank, the Army Weekly, 1944
- Born: Solveig Ann Mari Eklund; December 17, 1924; Finland
- Died: March 3, 2020 (aged 95); Danbury, Connecticut, U.S.
- Other names: Selene Eklund Weaver
- Citizenship: Finland; United States (from 1946)
- Occupation: Model
- Spouses: Albert George "Bert" Rupp Jr. (m. 1947; div. 1949) John Wendell "Jack" Anderson Jr. (m. 1949; div. 1957) William Merritt Weaver Jr. (m. 1958; div. 1972)
- Children: 3

Selene Mahri (born Solveig Ann Mari Eklund; December 17, 1924 – March 3, 2020), also known as Selene Eklund Weaver, was a Finnish-American fashion model and pin-up girl. During World War II, she appeared on the covers of Vogue, Life, and Cosmopolitan. She was also the poster girl and face of the WAVES (Women Accepted for Volunteer Emergency Service) and a pin-up girl for Yank, the Army Weekly.

Mahri was also known for her personal life, including being the mistress of Greek shipping billionaire Stavros Niarchos. She was also married to and divorced from three millionaires and is credited with coining the saying, "Marriage is a question of give and take. You give. I take."

== Early years ==
Mahri was born as Solveig Ann Mari Eklund in Finland, on December 17, 1924, to Karl and Thyra Eklund. She moved to the United States in 1942 with her mother. According to an account in Life magazine, Mahri and her mother traveled to the United States to see the World's Fair, and "America seemed such a peaceful place, they decided to stay." Mahri could not speak English when she arrived and studied for two years to become proficient. In addition to Swedish and English, Mahri was able to read in Finnish, Danish, and German. Her mother reportedly worked as a personal aide to Mary Pickford. Mahri became a United States citizen in 1946.

== Modeling career ==
Mahri first gained a degree of fame in August 1942 when she was chosen to represent New York in the Miss America pageant. She was disqualified from the competition, with some sources stating that the disqualification was for being too young (age 17), and others stating it was due to her immigration status or foreign citizenship. After being eliminated from the Miss America competition, she was promoted by the U.S. Treasury Department as "Miss War Bonds".

Mahri became a model for fashion designer Nettie Rosenstein and by 1943 with the John Powers modeling agency. Her hair was described as "so blond it's almost white". Her body was described as being "slim as a wand" with "lovely, flowing lines". She was 5 ft 9 1/2 in (1.77 m) to 5 ft 10 in (1.78 m), 120 to 125 pounds (54 to 57 kg) and had measurements of 34 inches (860 mm) (bust), 24 inches (610 mm) (waist), and 34 inches (860 mm) (hips). She became a favorite of photographer John Rawlings and "Manhattan's top model." She appeared on covers of Vogue magazine (including January 15, 1943, September 1, 1944, and December 15, 1944). She was also featured on the cover of other magazines, including Life (December 6, 1943, and October 9, 1944), Cosmopolitan, and British Vogue. Dorothy Kilgallen called Mahri "probably New York's most beautiful model" and wrote in October 1944 that Mahri had appeared in a single month in eight national magazines and was charging $25-an-hour for modeling work.

In addition to fashion modeling, Mahri became the poster girl for the WAVES (Women Accepted for Volunteer Emergency Service) in 1943. She was used on most of the recruitment posters issued by the WAVES and "became the face and figure of the WAVES." She was also a Yank pin-up girl in 1944.

According to columnist Doris Lilly of the Daily News, Mahri became known as "the personification of the blonde ice goddess." By 1947, she was charging $40 per hour for her modeling services which was well above the prevailing rates at the time of $10 to $25 per hour. She noted that her high hourly rate also ensured that photographers and clients behaved themselves: "At that price, your time is too valuable. No matter who you are, or how rich, they keep their minds on their work." She added, "I kept raising my price to keep from working – and people kept meeting it."

Some thought that Mahri might have had a career as a movie star but for her "strange, nasal voice."

== Personal life ==
In 1944 Mahri was engaged to Emilio Tagli, a wealthy Chilean man. Mahri also had a relationship in the 1940s with the married Greek shipping billionaire Stavros Niarchos and was regularly seen with him at the Stork Club and El Morocco in Manhattan. Niarchos bought her a car, a town house, a country house, jewelry, and two standard French poodles. Mahri later recalled of her attraction to Niarchos that he had "such fantastic, bony, degenerate hands."

Mahri's first husband was Albert George "Bert" Rupp Jr., to whom she was married in 1947. They were divorced in 1949.

Mahri's second husband was John Wendell "Jack" Anderson Jr. of Grosse Pointe, Michigan, a Detroit industrialist. They were married in 1949 and had two sons, John and Christopher. They divorced in 1957.

Mahri's third husband was William Merritt Weaver Jr., a wealthy financier and operator of tungsten mines. They married in 1958 and had a daughter Wendy Mari. They divorced in 1972. At the time, syndicated newspaper columnist Suzy wrote that she was "divorcing her third husband (and her third millionaire)".

Mahri received press coverage for her romantic relationships and marriages to wealthy men. She was credited with inventing the saying, "Marriage is a question of give and take. You give. I take."

=== Death ===
Selene Mahri died in Danbury, Connecticut on March 3, 2020, at the age of 95.

== See also ==
- Pin-ups of Yank, the Army Weekly
- List of Vogue (US) cover models
- List of British Vogue cover models
