= Karen Harris (model) =

American model

Karen Harris was one of the first exclusive models for Estee Lauder, Inc., from 1962 (with Phyllis Connor) until 1971, when she was replaced by Karen Graham. As with all Lauder models prior to 1993, Victor Skrebneski photographed the ads in which Harris appeared.
