= RBW =

rbw or RBW may refer to:

- "Red Blooded Woman", a 2004 single by Australian pop/dance singer Kylie Minogue
- a widely used acronym for US District Court Judge Reggie B. Walton
- Relativistic Breit–Wigner distribution, a probability distribution that models resonances in high-energy physics
- Resolution Bandwidth, electronic signal term used in spectrum analyzers and EMI / EMC testing
- Rainbow Group (1984–1989), a political group of the European Parliament
- Rainbow Group (1989–1994), a political group of the European Parliament
- RBW (company), a South Korean entertainment company
- Rivendell Bicycle Works, an American producer of bicycle frames
- Reed Baker-Whiting, an American soccer player
- Robert Burns Woodward, an American organic chemist
- René Bouët-Willaumez, a French fashion illustrator
