= Karen Harris =

Karen Harris may refer to:

- Karen Harris (model), American model for Estee Lauder, Inc.
- Karen Harris (writer), American television writer
- Karen R. Harris, educational psychologist and special educator
