= Grafström =

Grafström is a Swedish surname. Notable people with the surname include:

- Anders Abraham Grafström (1790–1870), Swedish historian, priest, and poet
- Bengt Grafström (born 1946), Swedish radio and television presenter
- Gillis Grafström (1893–1938), Swedish figure skater
- Mattias Grafström (born 1980), Swiss–born Swedish football administrator
- Ruth Sigrid Grafstrom (1905–1986), American illustrator
- Sven Grafström (1902–1955), Swedish diplomat
- Thyra Grafström (1864–1925), Swedish textile artist
