= Pierre Brissaud =

French painter (1885–1964)

Pierre Brissaud (23 December 1885 – 17 October 1964) was a French Art Deco illustrator, painter, and engraver. He was born in Paris and trained at the École des Beaux-Arts and Atelier Fernand Cormon in Montmartre, Paris. His father was Dr. Édouard Brissaud, a student of Dr. Jean-Martin Charcot. His fellow students at Cormon were his brother Jacques, André-Édouard Marty, Charles Martin, and Georges Lepape. Students at the workshop drew, painted and designed wallpaper, furniture and posters. Earlier, Toulouse-Lautrec, van Gogh, and Henri Matisse had studied and worked there. Pierre's older brother Jacques Brissaud was a portrait and genre painter and his uncle Maurice Boutet de Monvel illustrated the fables of La Fontaine, songbooks for children and a life of Joan of Arc. A first cousin was the celebrated artist and celebrity portrait painter Bernard Boutet de Monvel.

Brissaud is known for his pochoir (stencil) prints for the fashion magazine Gazette du Bon Ton published by Lucien Vogel in Paris. Many of Brissaud's illustrations are realistic leisure scenes of the well-to-do. They illustrate the designs of Paris fashion houses such as Jeanne Lanvin, Chéruit, Worth, and Doucet. Brissaud's illustrations appeared in Vogue after it bought Bon Ton in 1925, as well as House & Garden and Fortune, and in books like Madame Bovary, Manon Lescaut, Mémoires de Saint-Simon, the autobiographical novels of Anatole France, Two gentlemen of Verona and many others.

In 1907 he exhibited at the Salon des Indépendants and the Salon d'Automne.

== Bibliography ==
- Dictionnaire critique et documentaire des peintres, sculpteurs, dessinateurs et graveurs, Emmanuel Bénézit, Pub, Paris, Gründ, 1999 ISBN 0-8288-5635-4
- Dizionario della moda by Mariella Azzali, Pub. Calderini; ISBN 88-7019-471-X
- Exposition de peintures... Pierre Brissaud..., Louis Vauxcelles, pub. Devambez, (art dealers), Paris, 1909, (N. Y. Pub. Lib.)
- French Fashion Plates in Full Colour from the Gazette du Bon Ton (1912–1925), Lepape et al., N. Y., Dover, 1979 ISBN 0-486-23805-9
- Les Petits Maitres de la Peinture valeur de demain 1820-1920 by Gérald Schurr, pub. Les Editions de l'Amateur, Paris, 1975
- Pierre Brissaud Jean Dulac, pub. Henri Babou, 1929, Paris, (Getty Mus. Lib. & N. Y. Pub. Lib.)
- Pierre Brissaud: La grande époque, Paris 1909 - 1929, l'art et la
