= René Bouët-Willaumez =

French illustrator and graphic designer (1900–1979)

Count René Louis Marie Bouët-Willaumez (12 June 1900 – 14 April 1979), also referred to by his signature R.B.W. was a French fashion illustrator, primarily known for working for Vogue.

== Biography ==
Bouët-Willaumez was born in Rennes on 12 June 1900, son of Count Henry Edouard Hervé Bouët-Willaumez and Fanny Marie Anne Dorange. His great-grandfather was Édouard Bouët-Willaumez an admiral in the French Navy, Édouard was the adopted son of Jean-Baptiste Philibert Willaumez (who was appointed a count by King Louis Philippe I in 1844 and with the permission of the King transferred his title to Édouard). The Bouët-Willaumez family was settled around Belle Île though originally from Normandy.

He studied engineering at the École Polytechnique in Paris, before becoming a fashion illustrator at the encouragement of Vogue Paris editor-in-chief and fashion designer Main Bocher.

The English Isabel 'Babs' Gadsden was Bouët-Willaumez's first wife, she worked for Vogue as a model and illustrator and would leave him for Vogue photographer John Rawlings.

Bouët-Willaumez began working for American Vogue in 1929 and during this time a rivalry developed between Bouët-Willaumez and American fashion illustrator Carl Erickson. Bouët-Willaumez married to German model and interior decorator Margaret Maléna Minnigerode before the outbreak of World War II (later divorced). He moved to New York City at the beginning of World War II and continued to illustrate for American Vogue until 1953, continuing contributions to the British and French editions until his 1958 retirement in France.

In 1969, he married Fabienne de Boisboissel, de Boisboissel was from Breton nobility like Bouët-Willaumez.

He died on 14 April 1979 in Clamart.

English fashion illustrator David Downtown has cited Bouët-Willaumez as an inspiration.
