= Wenda Parkinson =

American model, actress, and author (1923–1987)

- Parkinson in 1951
- Education: Royal Academy of Dramatic Art
- Occupations: Author, actress, model
- Spouse: Norman Parkinson (m. 1945-)

Wenda Parkinson née Rogerson (1923 – October 24, 1987) was a British-born model, author, and actress best known for her modeling for her husband, Norman Parkinson. Prior to her modeling, she was an actress and was deemed "among of the most promising actresses of her generation" by The Daily Telegraph. She was also a columnist and writer for British Vogue, and wrote one book, This Gilded African, a biography of Toussaint L'Ouverture, which received mixed reviews but became recommended reading. She spent much of her later life in Tobago, and became a citizen of the country of Trinidad and Tobago.

== Life and career ==
She was born Wenda Rogerson to a doctor father, and studied at the Channing School. Taking after her mother, who loved theater, at the age of nine she wrote letters to John Gielgud and soon became friends with him. At 15, she left school to attend the Royal Academy of Dramatic Art, which she received a Leverhulme scholarship for, and eventually went on to leave that too in order to play in a production of The Master Builder.

She often acted at the Arts Theatre, and also acted at the Oxford Playhouse. She was recruited to model for Vogue by Cecil Beaton, and through this work met Norman Parkinson, who became her primary photographer. During her time as an actress, according to The Daily Telegraph, she was "generally acknowledged to be among the most promising actresses of her generation". Critics stated that she would likely become one of the most famous, as well.

She married Parkinson. The date they married is questioned: the National Portrait Gallery, London states he began photographing her in 1947 and married her in 1951, while her obituary in The Daily Telegraph stated she married Parkinson in 1945 and British Vogue has stated their wedding was in 1947.

After the wedding, she chose to give up acting and spent the next six years modeling for Parkinson, including many dangerous locations around the world: notable photos included one where she was riding an ostrich, which went on to run, leaving her behind, and one where they ran through the rubble of the Ritz New York City to reach its ballroom before it was torn down. She was viewed as his muse. All of her photographs as a model were anonymous: she commented that "It would be impossible to have my own career and live with Park[inson]. He'd never put up with it." She was also often photographed by Clifford Coffin, whose best known photoshoot of her was of her under a bombed house, seeking to depict a return to normalcy: a rivalry formed between him, Parkinson, and Beaton. She was a cover model for Vogue multiple times.

She ultimately chose to retire from modeling after her son, then six years old, told her a friend had a photo of her on his wall and "took exception". She moved to Tobago in 1963, which she made her primary home. After she moved to Tobago, she took up farming and sausage-making, stating that she was "in the sausage business". She became a citizen of Trinidad and Tobago.

She was close friends with Koo Stark, and announced Stark's engagement and upcoming wedding to the Daily Mirror. She was also close friends with Zandra Rhodes.

== Writings ==
She wrote articles on her and her husband's travels and on the photoshoots, which were published in British Vogue, and also wrote pieces on advice for living well. She joined the travels and wrote these articles even when she was not modeling at the locations being traveled to. She also authored a section, entitled An Englishwoman discovers Tobago, in a book about Trinidad and Tobago.

=== This Gilded African ===
The only book she ever wrote was This Gilded African, a biography of Toussaint L'Ouverture taking its name from a nickname given to him by Napoleon. It was released in 1978 and published by Quartet Books. According to Outre-Mers, she wrote the work for "her sisters in Trinidad and Tobago". She expressed concern while writing about whether her as a white woman writing about L'Ouverture, who was black, would be taken negatively.

It received mixed reviews. Nation Review's Paul Foot stated her book was "hugely welcome" but that he was disappointed, stating that her "adoration of [L'Ouverture] spills over, as is usual, into criticism of his colleagues." Foot, however, would go on to recommend the work during a lecture he delivered in 1991. The Hispanic American Historical Review assessed it as having "far from exhaustive" research and "distort[ing] the obvious", and also viewed her as being "too quick to apologize for [L'Ouverture]'s mistakes", but also praised its "beautiful prose" and its showcasing his leadership, both in the early days and later as it got more complex. The Courier Journal noted errors including calling the Pinta "Tinto" and misspelling St. Domingue "St. Dominigue", though it also noted an "intimate knowledge of Haiti and the Caribbean" and her writing's "liveliness and... exotic detail". Francis P. Lynch of Hartford Courant bluntly stated "[L'Ouverture's] memory deserves a better biography than this."

The Guardian's Victor Kiernan, however, reviewed the work more favorably, acknowledging flaws including "some looseness of phrasing and occasional inaccuracy over details", but emphasizing her writing's "warm sympathy" and use of new material. Kiernan also stated she had a "gift of dramatic narrative" and urged that while "this is her first book, it should not be her last". Similarly, the Irish Independent stated the work had "an incredible amount of research", The Sentinel viewed it as having "great care and sympathy", and Manchester Evening News and the Caribbean Review of Books both dubbed it "very readable". Outre-Mers further dubbed it "a pleasure to read", and Robin Furneaux for The Sunday Telegraph assessed it as "lively and exciting", as well as reliable when it comes to Haitian affairs. The Teachers Institute of Philadelphia has listed it as a recommended assigned reading when covering the Haitian revolution. Historian Donald D. Horward listed it as among the best English-language biographies of L'Ouverture in his Napoleonic Military History: A Bibliography.

== Death and legacy ==
She died on October 24, 1987 at the age of 64. Fourteen photographs of her, taken by her husband, are held in the collection of the National Portrait Gallery, London. In 2023, on her centenary, a retrospective exhibition was held focused on her.
