= Eduardo Benito =

Spanish fashion illustrator and painter

Eduardo García Benito (1891–1981), also known simply as García Benito was a Spanish fashion illustrator and painter, noted for his Vogue covers of the 1920s and 1930s.

He studied at the Mignon studio, and later trained under Daniel Vierge. In 1912 he moved to Paris, he later spent 15 years painting Vogue covers. Among Benito's subjects as a portrait painter were Alfonso XIII of Spain, Paul Poiret, and the Chinese royal family. Also in 1912, he won a scholarship to study at L’École des Beaux-Arts in Paris.
