= Nancy Berg =

American model and actress (1931–2022)

- Born: July 9, 1931; Kenosha, Wisconsin, U.S.
- Died: February 4, 2022 (aged 90); New York, U.S.
- Occupations: Model, actress
- Years active: 1950s–1964
- Spouse(s): Geoffrey Horne (m. 1958; div. 1962) Alan Elliott (divorced) Richard Praeger (divorced)
- Children: 1

Nancy Berg (July 9, 1931 – February 4, 2022) was an American model and actress.

== Early life and education ==
Berg was born in Kenosha, Wisconsin, to Paul Axel Berg and Dorothy Esther (née Schanock) Berg. She moved with her family to Red Bank, New Jersey at age six. Her father was with the United States Coast Guard at Stations Sandy Hook and Monmouth Beach at the time. She attended Red Bank Catholic High School until 1948 when she moved to Detroit with her father who had divorced her mother and remarried.

== Career ==
Berg began her career as a model and actress in Detroit and Chicago. Berg was on the front cover of Vogue four times, starting in 1953, and was Esquire's "Lady Fair" for May of 1956.

She was also the star and sole performer on a 1955 New York television program entitled Count Sheep which aired on WRCA-TV five nights a week from 1:00 to 1:05 a.m. ET. The nightgown-clad Miss Berg would appear, get into bed, perform a bit of business, such as read from Romeo and Juliet or eat grapes off a toy Ferris wheel, and then, in extreme close-up, whisper a good night to the camera and pretend to go to sleep as animated sheep jumped over a fence. Her manager stated, 'A lot of people watch it. God knows why.'" She earned $150 for each five-minute performance.

By 1960, Berg was earning $40,000 per year.

In 1962, Berg toured with Bob Cummings in a production of Tunnel of Love.

In 1964, she appeared on “Perry Mason” in S8E12’s “The Case of the Wooden Nickel”.

== Personal life ==
Berg was married to actor Geoffrey Horne on February 6, 1958, with whom she had a child. They divorced in 1962. She was also married to, and divorced from, Alan Elliott and Richard Praeger in the 1960s. She died on February 4, 2022, at the age of 90, in New York.

== Filmography ==
- Fail-Safe (1964) as Ilsa Wolfe
- Thunder in Dixie (1964) as Karen Hallet
- Count Sheep with Nancy Berg (1955)
