= Peggy Dillard =

American model and actress (born 1956)

- Born: Greenville County, South Carolina
- Occupation: Model
- Spouse: Alvin Toone

Peggy Dillard-Toone (born 1956) is an American model and actress.

== Early life and education ==
Dillard-Toone was born and raised in Greenville County, South Carolina, the youngest of 10 children. She attended League Junior High and Wade Hampton High School, graduating at age 16. Dillard-Toone then moved to Brooklyn, New York to attend Pratt Institute of Technology, earning a bachelor's degree in Fine Arts, with an emphasis on advertising, fashion merchandising and marketing.

== Modeling and entertainment career ==
Dillard-Toone was the second black model featured on the cover of Vogue magazine. She was on the cover of the magazine in 1977, 1978 and 1979, with images captured by Vogue photographer Albert Watson. Dillard-Toone was among the rare black models who appeared with regularity in publications like Glamour magazine.

In addition to Vogue, Dillard-Toone has appeared on the covers of Mademoiselle, Cosmopolitan, Ebony, and Essence magazines. Her career lasted for four decades and includes high-fashion editorials, along with runway, catalogue, film, commercial, voice-over, and playwriting work.

== Honors and recognitions ==
In 1998, Dillard-Toone was a South Carolina African American History Calendar honoree.

In 2026, she was honored as a Greenville 'Barrier Breaker'.

== Personal life ==
Dillard-Toone is married to artist Lloyd Toone.
