= Clifford Coffin (photographer) =

American photographer (1913–1972)

Clifford Coffin (1913–1972) was an American fashion photographer, particularly for Vogue magazine, and a "wild and eccentric bohemian". He has also been called "the greatest of Vogue magazine's 'lost' photographers", and an "outspoken homosexual with a heroic appetite for self-destruction, his bad behaviour was legendary". He often photographed Wenda Parkinson.

Clifford Coffin: The Varnished Truth – Photographs from Vogue 1945 to 1955 was an exhibition at London's National Portrait Gallery for three months in 1997.

Coffin suffered from alcoholism and drug addiction, and died of throat cancer in Pasadena, California, in 1972, aged 58.
