= Pierre Mourgue =

French illustrator, graphic designer and lithographer (1890–1969)

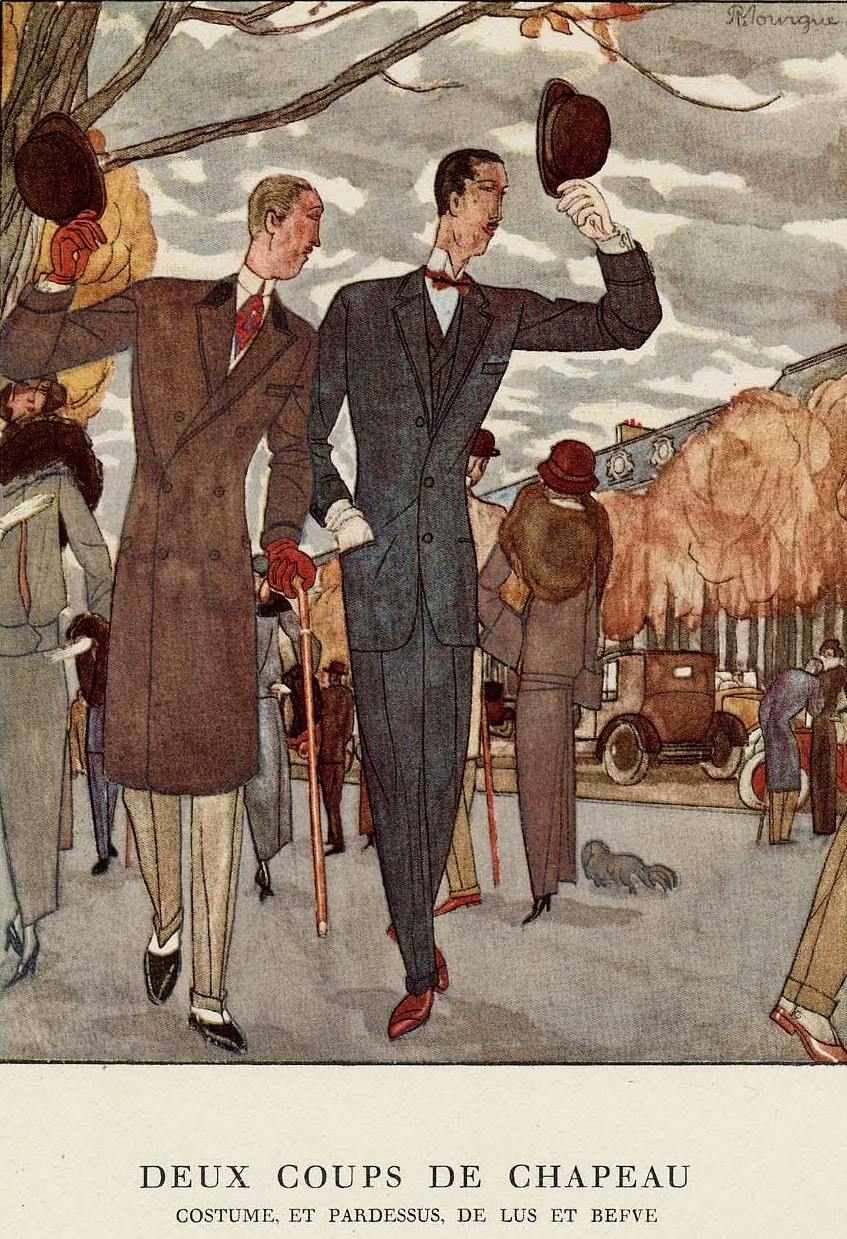
Mourgue illustration for Gazette du Bon Ton (November 1922)

Pierre Mourgue (1890 – 1969) was a French fashion illustrator and lithographer.

Mourgue was appointed in-house illustrator for Gazette du Bon Ton in the early 1900s. Following the acquisition of Gazette du Bon Ton by Condé Monterose Nast he was invited to New York City to work for Condé Nast Publications. Mourgue travelled between New York and Paris illustrating for Vogue, British Vogue, German Vogue, Vogue Paris, Harper's Bazaar, La Femme Chic, L'Officiel, and Femina.

He created illustrations for the houses of Balenciaga, Balmain, Christian Dior, Givenchy, Jacques Fath, Lanvin, Marcel Rochas, and Nina Ricci. Mourgue also illustrated advertisements for the Printemps and Félix Potin department store chains.

During World War II, he was a lieutenant for the French Army and featured in a 1940 editorial piece on Parisian fashion for Life. He also illustrated for l'Album de la Mode du Figaro (first issue in December 1942) a magazine created by Vogue Paris Editor-in-Chief Michel de Brunhoff and published from Monte Carlo.
