= Victor Skrebneski =

American photographer (1929–2020)

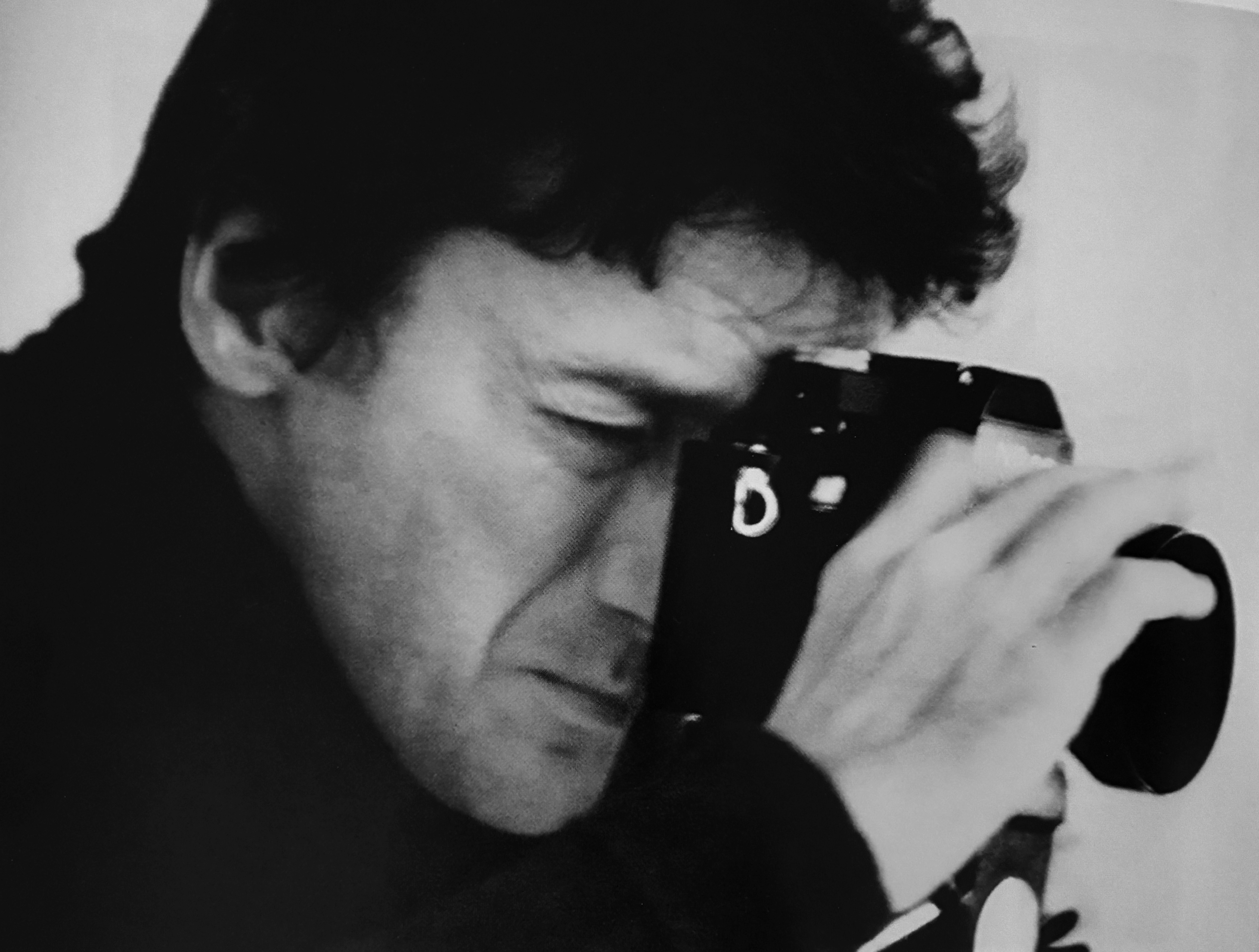
Skrebneski in his Chicago studio

Victor Paul Skrebneski (December 17, 1929 – April 4, 2020) was an American photographer born in Chicago to parents of Polish and Russian heritage. He was educated at the School of the Art Institute of Chicago in 1943 and attended the Illinois Institute of Technology from 1947 to 1949. He set up his own studio in Chicago in 1952. The Art Institute of Chicago had an exhibit of his work in 1969.

Skrebneski is most known for his fashion photography and his work for the ad campaigns of Estee Lauder, Inc., notably his fifteen-year collaboration (1970-1985) with model Karen Graham creating the portrait portfolio marketing campaign known as 'The Estee Lauder Woman.' The longevity and format of this campaign make it unique in the annals of marketing. A single portrait of Graham was placed in fashion magazines each month depicting an element in the idealized life of 'The Estee Lauder Woman,' often photographed in black and white, an unusual medium for cosmetics, fragrance, and skin care product lines, which commonly rely upon the visual impact of color photography. The focus on this one theme produced approximately 180 portraits of Graham, each remarkably individual yet highly recognizable, an accomplishment few photographers or promotional efforts can be said to have achieved. Their initial collaboration concluded when Graham retired from modelling in 1985, though they later reunited in 1999 to shoot a new Estée Lauder campaign.

Skrebneski also photographed various celebrities, including Cindy Crawford (whose first notable photos he took), Vanessa Redgrave, Bette Davis, Oprah Winfrey, Audrey Hepburn, Diana Ross, Hubert de Givenchy, Diahann Carroll and François Truffaut.

He created numerous other ad campaigns. Skrebneski's black-and-white poster images shot for the Chicago International Film Festival often featured nude models and have become collectible over the years. Skrebneski died of cancer in Chicago on April 4, 2020, at the age of 90.
