= Mary Jane Russell =

American fashion model (1926–2003)

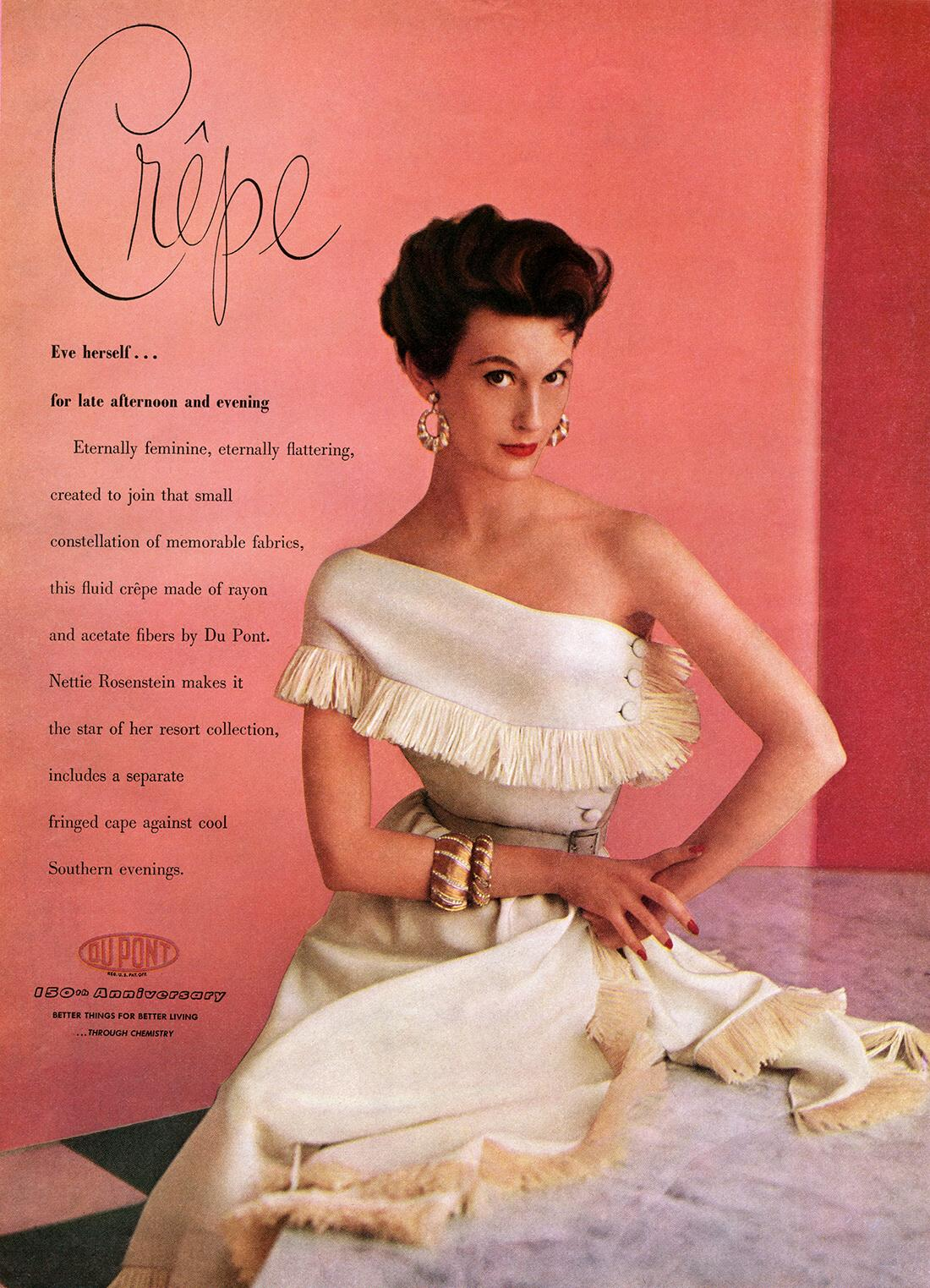
- Mary Jane Russell in 1952
- Born: Mary Jane Walton; July 10, 1926; Teaneck, New Jersey, U.S.
- Died: November 20, 2003 (aged 77); Charleston, South Carolina, U.S.
- Occupation: model
- Years active: 1948–1964
- Spouse: Edward Russell
- Children: 3

Mary Jane Russell (July 10, 1926 – November 20, 2003) was a New York City-based American photographic fashion model active from 1948 to 1961. She often worked with Louise Dahl-Wolfe and Irving Penn, and appeared on many covers for Vogue and Harper's Bazaar during the course of her modelling career. Her husband was Edward Russell, who became president of the advertising agency Doyle Dane Bernbach.

== Early life ==
Mary Jane Walton was born on 10 July 1926 in Teaneck, New Jersey, attended Teaneck High School, and studied art at Sarah Lawrence College in New York. During her time at Sarah Lawrence, Edward Russell, a classmate of hers from Teaneck, sent her love letters featuring hand-drawn cartoons from the South Pacific where he was serving in the war as a radioman for the Navy. After Edward returned from the War, they were married on 21 December 1946 to take advantage of the longest night of the year. Their wartime romance was featured by Larry King in his 2001 book, Love Stories of World War II.

== Modelling career ==
Mary Jane Russell began her modelling career in 1948, and was signed with Ford Models for the duration. Eileen Ford remembered her as being short by traditional female modeling standards (she was 5'6) and lacking confidence in her looks, but "exquisite". Her long neck and classical features were perfectly suited to the fashions of the period. She became a favourite model of the photographer Louise Dahl-Wolfe, to the extent that when an unwritten rule was encountered where model and photographer could not work together a third time, Dahl-Wolfe unsuccessfully hunted for a suitable replacement. Eventually, Carmel Snow, the editor of Harper's Bazaar, intervened and personally asked Russell to work with Dahl-Wolfe a third time. Irving Solero, the photographer for the Fashion Institute of Technology, has estimated that 30% of Dahl-Wolfe's photographs featured Mary Jane.

Russell was also a favourite model of Irving Penn, who remembered her qualities of concentration and tenderness. Two of Penn's better known images of her were Girl Drinking, published in Vogue in 1949, and the 1951 photograph Girl with Tobacco on Tongue. As Russell did not smoke, the process of taking the latter photograph made her physically sick. She also sat for Richard Avedon and William Klein.

=== Lawsuit ===
In 1956 Mary Jane Russell took legal proceedings against a number of companies over the inappropriate use of an advertising image for Marlboro Book Shops. The image, taken by Avedon, showed her and a man reading in bed together, captioned "For people who take their reading seriously". The image was subsequently sold by the Marlboro Book Shops to a bedsheets company, Spring Mills Inc., where it was touched up to give the man a beard, and advertised in three magazines (Ladies' Home Journal, Look, and Promenade), inviting readers to submit their own captions, such as "Lost Between the Covers". The company was associated with sleazy advertising, which meant that it had difficulty persuading top-end models to consent to work for them, and Russell, who had not authorized the image to be reused in this way, considered it damaging to her reputation. She subsequently sued both companies, and the three magazines who ran the advertisement. The decision of the New York Supreme Court in 1959 was that the broad release form she had signed with Avedon to allow Marlboro Book Shops use of the image had not authorized its use by other companies. In addition to this the substantial alterations made to the image meant it was no longer the same portrait that Russell had agreed could be used, and therefore she was entitled to damages. The case is still sometimes referenced and used as a case study in law textbooks.

== Later life and death ==
After retiring from modelling, Mary Jane Russell and her husband lived in Pound Ridge, New York for 37 years, where she involved herself with local zoning and environmental issues. The Russells then relocated to Bluffton, South Carolina, where Mary Jane involved herself in local Democratic politics. In 2003, Mary Jane died in a Charleston hospital of pulmonary fibrosis which had been diagnosed only a few weeks previously. She was survived by her husband and their three sons. Edward Russell died in 2007.
