= Lisa Taylor (model) =

American fashion model and actress

- Born: Lisa Stillman Taylor; 1951 (age 74–75); Oyster Bay, New York, US
- Occupations: Model; Actress
- Years active: 1971–present
- Spouse: Ellis Bradley Jones (m. 1989)
- Children: 2

Lisa Taylor is a model and actress from New York City. In the 1970s, she was a frequent presence in the pages of Vogue and appeared on the cover four times. She was the face of brands like Calvin Klein, Dior, and Oscar de la Renta. She is known for her roles in Eyes of Laura Mars (1978), Where the Buffalo Roam (1980) and Windy City (1984). She also appeared in the 2012 HBO documentary, About Face: Supermodels Then and Now.

== Family and early life ==
Taylor was born 1951 at Oyster Bay, New York. She quit her studies after a short stint at Pine Manor Junior College in Boston. Later she moved to New York, studied dance briefly and started modelling at the age of 19.

== Career ==
Taylor signed with the Ford modeling agency in 1971 at the age of 19. She was one of the most sought after models during the 1970s, appearing in many iconic ads for top designers like Christian Dior. In addition to her Vogue covers, she also appeared on the covers of Harper's Bazaar and New York magazine for a cover story titled, "When Supermodels Ran Wild." One of her first jobs was the cover of the college issue of Mademoiselle.

In 1982, she quit her modelling career and moved to West Coast of the United States to get rid of a debilitating drug and alcohol habit.

Taylor is very vocal about the use of drugs in the fashion industry.
