= Stan Shaffer =

American photographer (1944–2010)

Stanley Howard Shaffer (16 August 1944 – 10 June 2010) was an American fashion photographer.

He shot for Vogue, Interview, Bloomingdale's, and Victoria's Secret. Celebrity subjects included David Kennedy, Halston, Mariel Hemingway, and Andy Warhol. Other subjects included actresses and models, such as Carla Bruni, Janice Dickinson, Patti Hansen, Jerry Hall, Uma Thurman, and Rachel Ward and performers such as Louise Robey (whom he married in 2008), Pete Townshend, and John Phillips with Geneviève Waïte. As a filmmaker, his short films won awards internationally.

Shaffer was born in Brooklyn, New York, in 1944. He also grew up in rural Illinois.
