= Dorothy McGowan =

American actress (1939–2022)

- Born: August 28, 1939; Brooklyn, New York, U.S.
- Died: January 2, 2022 (aged 82); Mamaroneck, New York, U.S.
- Occupation(s): Model, film actress
- Spouse: Didier Dorot (divorced)
- Children: 2

Dorothy McGowan (sometimes credited as Dorothy MacGowan) was a Brooklyn, New York–born model and actress.

A daughter of Irish immigrants Sarah (née Philbin) and Michael McGowan, and born in the Bay Ridge section of Brooklyn, she had one sister, Mary, and two brothers, Peter, a policeman who was ordained in 1966 as a Roman Catholic priest, and James, also a policeman, whose role as lead negotiator in a hostage crisis was dramatized in the film Dog Day Afternoon.

McGowan was one of photographer William Klein's favorite models. After the release of Who Are You, Polly Maggoo?, in which she starred, she disappeared from public life.

She was married to, and divorced from photographer Didier Dorot, with whom she had two children. In 2022, she died at age 82 in Mamaroneck, New York.
