= Sondra Peterson =

American model (born 1935)

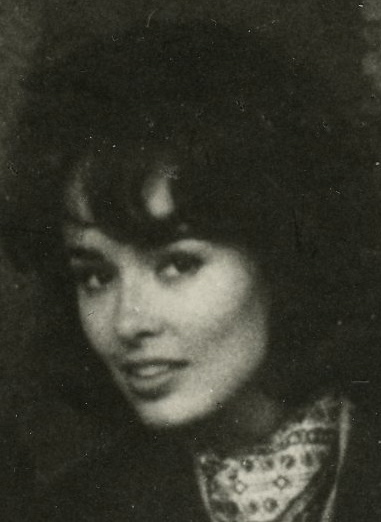
- Snapshot of Sondra Peterson in 1958
- Born: 1935 (age 90–91); Kansas City, Missouri, U.S.
- Spouse: Daniel Filipacchi
- Children: 2, including Amanda Filipacchi
- Modeling information
- Hair color: Brown
- Eye color: Brown
- Agency: Ford Models

Sondra Peterson (born 1935) is an American model. She is best known for her work in the 1950s and 1960s appearing in major magazines beside other icons of the age like Veruschka von Lehndorff and Jean Shrimpton.

== Modeling career ==
Signed by Eileen Ford to the Ford Modeling Agency, she was photographed by leading photographers, including Francis McLaughlin Gill and Irving Penn. She was profiled in Eileen Ford's Book Of Model Beauty.

Seventeen highlighted famous models in the sixties in a series of "How to look like..." articles. Peterson was on the cover of various issues of the magazine, and in the May 1960 issue she was featured on the cover for an article about "How to Look Like Sondra Peterson."

== Personal life ==
Peterson has two children with French media executive Daniel Filipacchi, Chairman Emeritus of Hachette Filipacchi Médias, one of which is writer Amanda Filipacchi (born 1967).
