= Outre-Mers (journal) =

Outre-Mers. Revue d'histoire
- Discipline: History
- Language: French

Publication details
- Former name: Revue de l'histoire des colonies françaises
- History: 1913 to date
- Frequency: Semi-annual

Standard abbreviations
- ISO 4: Outre-Mers

Indexing
- ISSN: 2275-4954

Links
- Journal homepage

Outre-mers. Revue d'Histoire is a semi-annual French journal, founded in 1913 under the title Revue de l'histoire des colonies françaises. It publishes two double issues annually.
