= Tom Palumbo =

American photographer and theatre director

- Born: January 25, 1921; Molfetta, Apulia, Italy
- Died: October 13, 2008 (aged 87); New York City, U.S.
- Occupations: Photographer, theatre director
- Spouse(s): Anne St. Marie (1958–1986; her death); Patricia Bosworth (2000–2008; his death)
- Children: 2

Tomas Palumbo (January 25, 1921 – October 13, 2008) was an Italian-born American photographer and theatre director.

== Biography ==
Palumbo was born in Molfetta, Italy, in 1921. His family moved to New York City when he was about twelve years old.

As a young man, Palumbo was employed first building scale models for ships in an engineering company. Later, he was employed as an assistant by photographer James Abbe. His experience working with Abbe led him to commercial work in fashion photography. His early campaign work for Peck & Peck Department Store appeared in Vogue and Bazaar magazines from 1949 to 1953.

Palumbo was a staff photographer of Vogue from 1959 until 1962 and at Harper's Bazaar from 1953 until 1959, where he worked with the art directors Alex Liberman and Alexey Brodovitch. He was a vice-president of creative productions at Ted Bates, where he oversaw all TV commercials.

Palumbo was a lifelong member of the Actors Studio. He taught photography at Rhode Island School of Design, and he taught directing at the School of Visual Arts in New York City. He directed plays Off-Broadway and in regional theatres. His last production was An Evening of Proust at Lincoln Center. He was a member of the Lincoln Center Directors Lab.

Palumbo's first marriage was to model Anne St. Marie, until her death of lung cancer in 1986. The couple had two children. Later, he married Patricia Bosworth (1933–2020) in 2000.

In October 2008, Palumbo died due to complications from Lewy body disease.

== Bibliography ==
- Bosworth, Patricia (2018). Tom Palumbo, Dreamer with a thousand thrills, the rediscovered photography. PowerHouse Books, 2018. ISBN 9781576878071.
