= George Wolfe Plank =

American illustrator

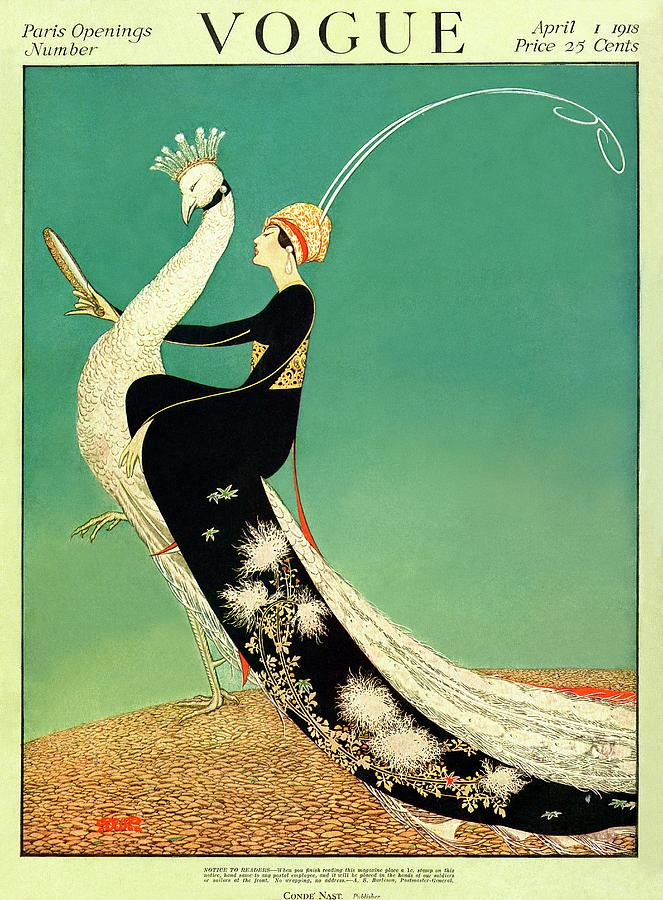
Vogue cover by George Wolfe Plank, April 1918

George Wolfe Plank (25 March 1883 – 4 May 1965) was an American artist illustrator, chiefly remembered for his long-term association with Vogue magazine, which resulted in years of covers in an Art Deco style related to that of Helen Dryden although uniquely adventurous and queer.

== Life ==
George Wolfe Plank was born in 1883 in a poor family near Gettysburg. He was raised by his grandparents in Bendersville after his mother died. While working in factories and stores he taught himself to draw and paint.

In 1907, he moved to Philadelphia and started editing and publishing The Butterfly Quarterly with Margaret H. Scott, Alice Smith and Amy Smith. From 1911 to 1936, he worked for British Vogue and his illustrations were used both on US and UK covers. In 1914, he moved to Britain with two of his friends, James and Mildred Whitall, and became friends with other modernists, including Hilda Doolittle (H.D.).

In 1915, Plank met E. F. Benson with whom he had an intense relationship. Neither Plank nor Benson declared themselves homosexuals publicly; however, their correspondence and journals leave very little doubt as to their sexual orientation. They lived together, presented as a couple in their social circles and Plank also became close to Mary Benson, Benson's mother. In 1916, he provided the illustrations for Benson's book The Freaks of Mayfair.

In order to supplement his income, Plank also provided illustrations for other friends' books, such as Lady Wellesley's Genesis and H.D.'s Hedgehog. He also worked on theater production and costume design, propaganda during World War I, and mapmaking as well as cloth, decor, stationery, and toy design.

Until 1920, when their relationship suddenly came to an end, Plank and Benson spent time together in London and in Benson's Sussex villa, Henry James's old house.. In 1927 Plank moved into a house designed for him by Edwin Lutyens

During World War II, Plank joined the Home Guard. He suffered from hyperthyroidism. He became a naturalized Briton in 1945 and died the same year in a Sussex nursing home.

== Style ==
Plank's work has been compared with artists such as Rackham, Edmund Dulac, Alphonse Mucha and Gustav Klimt. His work is characterized by broad fields of bright colour setting off the mass and line of his principal figures. His composition is clear and simple, the wealth of sartorial detail notwithstanding. Plank broke onto the Vogue scene with his mature style almost completely established, and worked for some years with no real rivals before Helen Dryden's work matured and she became one of the most important of his colleagues. William Packer described Plank's concept of fashion as "ideal, bizarre and improbable, at once adventurous and yet romantic and nostalgic".

This style is qualified as "queer" by Christopher Reed: "I intend 'queer' here in its broadest sense, to indicate an attitude that delighted in destabilising institutionally sanctioned hierarchies". British Vogue's queerness reached its peak under Dorothy Todd who was its editor between 1922 and 1926. However, Plank's art started challenging artistic norms as well as heterosexual and cisgender social constructs in 1917, thanks to "etiolated" body proportions, inspiration from fin-de-siècle decadence, and bizarre clothing. According to Dominic Janes, "his style was all about artificiality and performativity". His style has also been described as "neo-rococo".

== Selected book illustrations ==
- The Freaks of Mayfair (1916) by E. F. Benson
- The London Years (1923) by James Whitall
