= Anne St. Marie =

American fashion model (1926–1986)

Anne St. Marie (June 16, 1926 – 1986) was an American fashion model, also known as Anne Sainte-Marie, and one of the leading models of the 1950s.

== Early life ==
She was born in Pasadena, California, on June 16, 1926. She is of French descent. Her family name comes from Saintes-Maries-de-la-Mer, in Provence. She studied English and art at the University of California.

St. Marie was involved in the making of Puzzle of a Downfall Child (1970) in which Faye Dunaway played a character in the film who had been inspired by St. Marie's life.

== Personal life ==
St. Marie was married to the photographer Tom Palumbo until her death in 1986 from lung cancer. They had one son.
