= Anton Bruehl =

American fashion photographer (1900–1982)

Anton Bruehl (1900–1982), was an Australian-born American fashion photographer.

== Early life and career ==
Anton Bruehl was born in Hawker, Australia in 1900, the son of German immigrants. In 1919, he moved to the United States to work as an electrical engineer and was already "a skilled amateur photographer". Bruehl was taught by Clarence H. White for six months in 1923, then being asked to teach at White's school for summer sessions in Maine. After White's passing in 1925, Bruehl opened his own studio in New York, at first partnering with photographer Ralph Steiner and then later with his older brother Martin Bruehl. Working in New York, Bruehl created colour photographs for advertisements in top American magazines such as Vogue and the Vanity Fair. Outside of advertising, Bruehl produced images of screen and stage stars, and other celebrities, and produced the award-winning documentary photo book Photographs of Mexico (1933). Bruehl won top advertising awards for his photography throughout the late 1920s and early 1930s. Working for Condé Nast Publications, he developed the Bruehl-Bourges color process with color specialist Fernand Bourges, which gave Condé Nast a monopoly on color magazine reproduction from 1932 to 1935. In 1931 Alma Reed exhibited Bruehl's non-commercial photographs at her New York gallery, Delphic Studios. Bruel retired from his photography studio in 1966.

== Exhibitions ==
- Contemporary American Photography, 1–31 March 1929, Ayer Galleries, Washington Square, Philadelphia.
- Photography 1839-1937, 17 March-18 April 1937, MoMA.
- Three Centuries of American Art, 24 May-31 July 1938, MoMA.
- Portraits, 4 November-7 December 1943, MoMA.
- The 28th Annual Exhibition of Advertising and Editorial Art of the New York Art Directors Club, 15 March-17 April 1949, MoMA.
- Anton Bruehl, 7–31 January 1969, The Art Guild of Boca Raton, Florida.
- Photographs from the Julien Levy Collection: Starting with Atget, 1976, Art Institute of Chicago.
- New Acquisitions, 28 March-3 May 1979, Centre for Creative Photography.
- In the Spotlight: Anton Bruehl Photographs, 23 October 2010- 6 February 2011, National Gallery of Australia.
- Modern Photographs from the Thomas Walther Collection 1909-1949, 13 December 2014 – 19 April 2015, MoMA.

== Collections ==
National Gallery of Australia, Canberra.

Museum of Modern Art, New York.

== Death ==
Bruehl died in 1982.
