= Karen Graham =

American model (born 1945)

Karen Ann Graham is an American former model from the 1970s and the 1980s and later worked in fly-fishing as an instructor. For fifteen years, she was a spokesmodel for the cosmetics company Estée Lauder.

== Early life ==
Karen Graham was born in Gulfport, Mississippi in 1945.

== Career ==
After college, Graham moved to New York City to pursue a career as a French-language high school teacher.

In 1969, Graham met model agency owner Eileen Ford while shopping at Bonwit Teller in Manhattan. Ford suggested that she become a model and shared her business card. This interaction launched Graham's modelling career.

Graham's early work included a photo shoot for Irving Penn. He included her in a shoot for Vogue, despite initial reluctance from editor-in-chief Diana Vreeland due to Graham's height. She subsequently appeared on the cover of Vogue 20 times between 1970 and 1975.

== The "Estée Lauder Woman" (1970–1985) ==
Graham's first major modelling assignment was for an Estée Lauder advertising campaign. The company began employing her intermittently in 1970 and 1971 for its print advertisements, working with Chicago photographer Victor Skrebneski. By 1973 she had become Estée Lauder's exclusive spokesmodel, a position she held for the remainder of the decade. She appeared in print and television advertisements that presented domestic scenes designed to project refinement and wealth.

In these advertisements Graham was not identified by name, a deliberate decision by Estée Lauder, who believed attention should remain on the product rather than the model. Some viewers unfamiliar with the fashion industry assumed Graham was Mrs Lauder. The campaigns reflected Lauder's idea of a woman of taste and sophistication. Skrebneski's sets often included Chinese vases, Pablo Picasso ceramics and bookshelves, aiming to suggest an affluent, cultured setting. Because Lauder products were marketed to higher-income consumers, the imagery emphasised exclusivity. Props included dolls, horses and—in a 1981 advertisement—a framed photograph of Nicholas II, the last Tsar of Russia. Most campaigns conveyed a traditional, European-influenced style, though one advertisement for the company's “Swiss age-controlling skincare program” portrayed Graham among mirrored cylinders in a minimalist, futuristic scene, her hair pulled back and fitted with a plastic headset-like accessory.

In 1981 model Shaun Casey joined Graham in the Estée Lauder campaign, and for the next four years the company was represented by two spokesmodels. Graham retired in 1985 at the age of 40, later telling People magazine in 2000 that she chose to leave modelling “while still on top.” Casey appeared briefly in subsequent advertisements before being replaced by future news anchor Willow Bay.

== Fly fishing and more modeling ==
Graham remained in New York City for another six years before moving to Rosendale, New York, where she took up fly fishing, a hobby introduced to her by her brother in the 1970s. She later co-founded a fly-fishing school with Bert Darrow.

In 1999 she returned to modelling in a campaign for Estée Lauder's “Resilience Lift” cream, which reunited her with photographer Victor Skrebneski. She also appeared in several seasons of ESPN2’s fishing series In Search of Fly Water. She now lives in the foothills of North Carolina and is also interested in horseback riding.

== Personal life ==
In 1974, Graham was engaged to David Frost. In 1974, Graham married Chicagoan, Delbert W. Coleman, casino owner, who ran the Stardust Hotel in Las Vegas, Nevada.

In Mississippi, she had a son, Graham Douglas Mavar, after Graham's maiden name, with Sam Mavar.
