= Carl Erickson (illustrator) =

American fashion illustrator and advertising artist

- Born: Carl Oscar August Erickson; 1891; Joliet, Illinois, US
- Died: 1958 (aged 66–67)
- Education: Academy of Fine Arts, Chicago, Illinois, US
- Known for: Fashion illustration

Carl Erickson (1891–1958), was a fashion illustrator and advertising artist who was well known for his work with Vogue magazine and Coty cosmetics. He worked for Vogue from 1916 to 1958 when he died; most likely from complications due to alcoholism. He was commonly known as "Eric," a name he used to sign his work, which was given to him by fellow students at the Academy of Fine Arts, Chicago. Along with fashion illustration, Erickson was also an accomplished portrait artist. President Franklin Delano Roosevelt, Queen Elizabeth II, Frank Sinatra, and Gertrude Stein are a few of the public figures who sat for him. During his early career he lived in New York City, and later moved Senlis, France, with his wife, the fashion illustrator Lee Creelman. They had one child, a daughter named Charlotte.
