= Georges Lepape =

French poster artist, illustrator, and fashion designer (1887–1971)

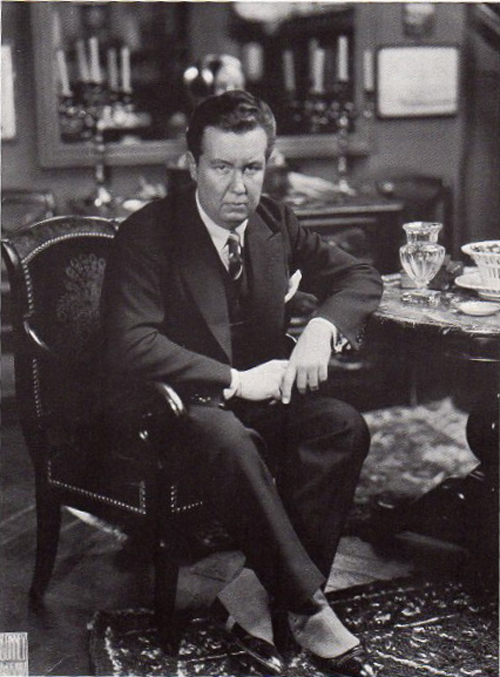
Lepape in 1921

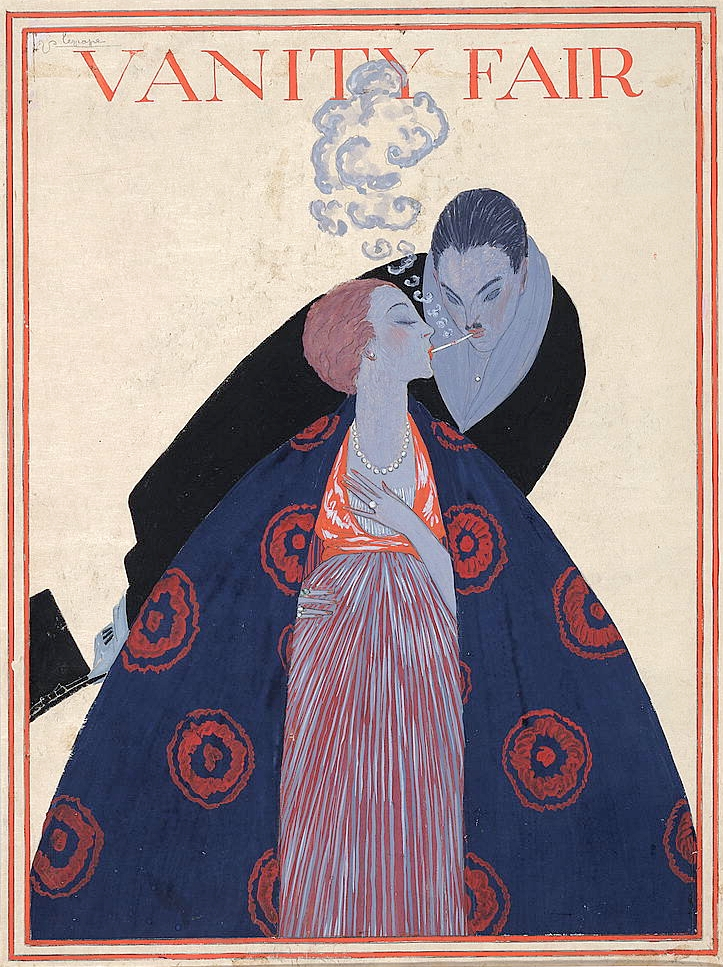
1919 Vanity Fair cover by Georges Lepape

Georges Lepape (1887–1971) was a French poster artist, illustrator, and fashion designer.

In 1911, Lepape was selected to illustrate the fashion designer Paul Poiret's latest work. Lepape was a frequent contributor to publications including La Gazette du Bon Ton, which was the leading monthly fashion publication in Paris from 1912 to 1925, Harper's Bazaar and Femina.

In 1916, Lepape designed his first Vogue cover, and had completed 116 Vogue covers by 1939.

His work is in the permanent collection of the V&A.
