= Ruth Sigrid Grafstrom =

American illustrator (1905–1986)

- Born: April 26, 1905; Rock Island, Illinois, US
- Died: September 7, 1986 (aged 81)
- Resting place: Saint Augustine, Florida, US
- Known for: Illustration
- Movement: Fashion Illustration

Ruth Sigrid Grafstrom (1905–1986) was an American illustrator, producing significant work in fashion illustration during the 1930s and 1940s.

== Early life ==
Grafstrom was born on April 26, 1905, in Rock Island, Illinois. Her father, Olaf Grafstrom was a painter from Sweden who immigrated to Seattle. His work influenced Northwest realist painters and at one time he chaired the art department at Augustana College. Ruth's mother was also an artist, focusing on ceramics.

Grafstrom attended school in Chicago and Paris and after graduating, worked in fashion illustration.

== Artistic career ==
She created illustrations for Vogue magazine, including some covers. Grafstrom also contributed illustrations to the Delineator, Cosmopolitan, and other women's magazines. Her illustrations featured real, approachable women. She drew "'real' women...[who] inhabit 'real' space." Her illustrations sometimes included fabric collage, to give the image texture.

== Later life and death ==
Grafstrom died on September 7, 1986, and is buried in Evergreen Cemetery in Saint Augustine, Florida.
