= John Rawlings (photographer) =

American glamour photographer (1912–1970)

John Rawlings (1912–1970) was a Condé Nast Publications fashion photographer from the 1930s through the 1960s. Rawlings left a significant body of work, including 200 Vogue magazine and Glamour magazine covers to his credit and 30,000 photos in archive, maintained by curator Kohle Yohannan.

Rawlings was in the elite circle of top Vogue photographers Irving Penn, Horst P. Horst, George Hoyningen-Huene, and George Platt Lynes. The photographer's recently rediscovered archive includes photographs of stage, screen, and society stars of the 1940s and 1950s, including Marlene Dietrich, Salvador Dalí, Veronica Lake, Bridget Bate Tichenor and Montgomery Clift.
