= List of British Vogue cover models =

This list of British Vogue cover models (1940–present) is a catalog of cover models who have appeared on the cover of British Vogue, the British edition of American fashion magazine Vogue.

== 1940s ==
=== 1940 ===
Issue	Cover model	Photographer
January		Carl Erickson
February	Muriel Maxwell; Lisa Fonssagrives; Unknown	Anton Bruehl
March		Jean Pagès
April	Helen Bennett; Muriel Maxwell; Florence Dornin	Horst P. Horst
May	Babe Paley	Horst P. Horst
June	Kay Herman	Horst P. Horst
July	Gene Tierney	Horst P. Horst
August	Lisa Fonssagrives	Horst P. Horst
September	Muriel Maxwell	Horst P. Horst
October	Helen Bennett	Horst P. Horst
November	Lisa Fonssagrives	John Rawlings
December		Anton Bruehl

=== 1941 ===
Issue	Cover model	Photographer
January	Meg Mundy	John Rawlings
February		Eduardo Benito
March	Muriel Maxwell; Meg Mundy; Susan Shaw; Helen Bennett; Unknown	Horst P. Horst
April		Joseph B. Platt
May	Tina McDonnell	John Rawlings
June	Susan Shaw	Horst P. Horst
July		Eduardo Benito
August	Gene Tierney	Anton Bruehl
September		Pierre Roy
October	Halldis Prince	Toni Frissell
November	Betty McLauchlen	Horst P. Horst
December	Alice Alexander	Horst P. Horst

=== 1942 ===
Issue	Cover model	Photographer
January		
February		Mehemed Fehmy Agha
March		Pierre Roy
April	Alice Alexander	John Rawlings
May		René Bouët-Willaumez
June		Horst P. Horst
July	Betty McLauchlen	Horst P. Horst
August	Maureen Zollman	John Rawlings
September		Horst P. Horst
October	Lenore Simon	Horst P. Horst
November	Meg Mundy	John Rawlings
December		

=== 1943 ===
Issue	Cover model	Photographer
January	Betty McLauchlen	John Rawlings
February	Marilyn Ambrose	Horst P. Horst
March	Selene Mahri	Horst P. Horst
April	Susan Shaw	Horst P. Horst
May	Sabrina Weber	Horst P. Horst
June	Muriel Maxwell	Horst P. Horst
July		Louis Maurer
August	Jessica Patton	John Rawlings
September	Betty McLauchlen	Horst P. Horst
October	Meg Mundy	John Rawlings
November	Bijou Barrington	Horst P. Horst
December	Lenore Simon	John Rawlings

=== 1944 ===
Issue	Cover model	Photographer
January		Carl Erickson
February		John Rawlings
March		John Rawlings
April		
May	Marilyn Ambrose	John Rawlings
June		
July		Horst P. Horst
August	Sabine Weber	Horst P. Horst
September	Barbara Tullgren	John Rawlings
October		Irving Penn
November	Jean Tait	Irving Penn
December	Kay Hernan	Irving Penn

=== 1945 ===
Issue	Cover model	Photographer
January	Leslie Venable	John Rawlings
February	Bettina Bolegard	Gjon Mili
March	Selene Mahri	John Rawlings
April	Meg Mundy	Irving Penn
May	Barbara Tullgren	Norman Parkinson
June	Lady Bartlett	James de Holden Stone
July		Eugène Berman
August		Cecil Beaton
September	Unknown; Andrea Johnson	John Rawlings
October		James de Holden Stone
November		Norman Parkinson
December	Leslie Venable	John Rawlings

=== 1946 ===
Issue	Cover model	Photographer
January	Natalie Paine	John Rawlings
February		Carl Erickson
March	Natalie Paine	John Rawlings
April	Jean Sinclair; Unknown	John Rawlings
May		Carl Erickson
June		Clifford Coffin
July		Carl Erickson
August		Erwin Blumenfeld
September		Cecil Beaton
October	Mary Tice	Irving Penn
November	Dorian Leigh	Horst P. Horst
December		Irving Penn

=== 1947 ===
Issue	Cover model	Photographer
January		Horst P. Horst
February		Richard Rutledge
March		Richard Rutledge
April	Barbara Tullgren	Horst P. Horst
May		Carl Erickson
June		Irving Penn
July		René Bouché
August		Irving Penn
September		René Bouët-Willaumez
October	Joan Pedersen	Irving Penn
November		Eugène Berman
December		Carl Erickson

=== 1948 ===
Issue	Cover model	Photographer
January		René Bouché
February	Carmen Dell'Orefice	Erwin Blumenfeld
March		Clifford Coffin
April	Betty Threat	Horst P. Horst
May	Barbara Goalen	Clifford Coffin
June	Ricki Van Dusen	Irving Penn
July	Dorian Leigh	John Rawlings
August	Carmen Dell'Orefice	Herbert Matter
September	Margot Smyly	Cecil Beaton
October	Jean Patchett	Serge Balkin
November	Jean Patchett	John Rawlings
December		Carl Erickson

=== 1949 ===
Issue	Cover model	Photographer
January	Jean Patchett	Horst P. Horst
February	Barbara Gaolen	Clifford Coffin
March	Wenda Parkinson	Norman Parkinson
April		Marcel Vertès
May	Evelyn Tripp	Erwin Blumenfeld
June	Analee Daniels	Cecil Beaton
July	Wenda Parkinson	Norman Parkinson
August	Ruth Knowles	Erwin Blumenfeld
September	Della Oake	Hans Wild
October	Mary Jane Russell	Frances McLaughlin-Gill
November	Wenda Parkinson	Norman Parkinson
December		Eugène Berman

== 1950s ==
=== 1950 ===
Issue	Cover model	Photographer
January	Lisa Fonssagrives	Irving Penn
February		Anthony Denney
March	Wenda Parkinson	Norman Parkinson
April	Bettina Graziani	Horst P. Horst
May	Della Oake	Norman Parkinson
June	Jean Patchett	Irving Penn
July	Evelyn Tripp	John Rawlings
August	Jean Patchett	Irving Penn
September	Dorian Leigh	Cecil Beaton
October	Barbara Miura	Anthony Denney
November	Margot Smyly	Horst P. Horst
December		Herbert Matter

=== 1951 ===
Issue	Cover model	Photographer
January		John Rawlings
February		
March		Norman Parkinson
April	Martita	Erwin Blumenfeld
May	Jean Patchett	Clifford Coffin
June	Susan Jameson	Norman Parkinson
July	Jean Patchett	Clifford Coffin
August	Anne St. Marie	Erwin Blumenfeld
September	Lisa Fonssagrives	Irving Penn
October	Lisa Fonssagrives	Irving Penn
November	Evelyn Tripp	Richard Rutledge
December	Della Oake	Cecil Beaton

=== 1952 ===
Issue	Cover model	Photographer
January	Lisa Fonssagrives	Clifford Coffin
February		
March		
April		Norman Parkinson
May	Shelagh Wilson	Don Honeyman
June	Eva Gerney	Horst P. Horst
July	Suzy Parker	Irving Penn
August	Wenda Parkinson	Norman Parkinson
September	Dovima	Roger Prigent
October	Suzy Parker	Roger Prigent
November	Loredana Pavone	Irving Penn
December	Barbara Goalen	John Deakin

=== 1953 ===
Issue	Cover model	Photographer
January	Suzy Parker	Horst P. Horst
February		
March		Norman Parkinson
April	Della Oake	Anthony Denney
May	Dovima	Erwin Blumenfeld
June		Norman Parkinson
July	Liz Pringle	John Rawlings
August		Erwin Blumenfeld
September		Henry Clarke
October	Cherry Nelms	Horst P. Horst
November		René Bouché
December		André François

=== 1954 ===
Issue	Cover model	Photographer
January		René Bouché
February		
March	Sandra Russel	Eugène Vernier
April	Nine de Voogt	Erwin Blumenfeld
May	Susan Abraham	Norman Parkinson
June	Wenda Parkinson	Norman Parkinson
July	Ricki Van Dusen	Karen Radkai
August	Analee Daniels	Norman Parkinson
September	Anne Gunning	Frances McLaughlin-Gill
October	Shirley Worthington	Eugène Vernier
November		Clifford Coffin
December	Elsa Martinelli	Clifford Coffin

=== 1955 ===
Issue	Cover model	Photographer
January	Evelyn Tripp	Erwin Blumenfeld
February	Susan Abraham	Norman Parkinson
March	Mary Jane Russell	John Rawlings
April	Sunny Harnett	Karen Radkai
May	Elsa Martinelli	Henry Clarke
June	Renée Breton	Hans Hammarskiöld
July	Suzy Parker	Irving Penn
August		Eugène Vernier
September		Carl Erickson
October	Barbara Mullen	Clifford Coffin
November	Mary Jane Russell	John Rawlings
December		Norman Parkinson

=== 1956 ===
Issue	Cover model	Photographer
January	Anne St. Marie	Henry Clarke
February	Ivy Nicholson	Norman Parkinson
March		Donald Silverstein
April	Simone D'Aillencourt	Norman Parkinson
May	Evelyn Tripp	Horst P. Horst
June	Anne Gunning	Irving Penn
July	Simone D'Aillencourt	Eugène Vernier
August	Barbara Mullen	Norman Parkinson
September	Anne Gunning	Norman Parkinson
October	Anne Gunning	Donald Silverstein
November	Barbara Mullen	Norman Parkinson
December	Joanna McCormick	Richard Rutledge

=== 1957 ===
Issue	Cover model	Photographer
January	Lucinda Hollingsworth	Clifford Coffin
February	Rose Marie Le Quellec	Henry Clarke
March	Wenda Parkinson	Norman Parkinson
April	Dorian Leigh	Norman Parkinson
May	Millie Perkins	Norman Parkinson
June		Karen Radkai
July	Gretchen Harris	Richard Rutledge
August	Marie-Hélène Arnaud	Norman Parkinson
September		Norman Parkinson
October	Antoinette Cumming	Norman Parkinson
November	Nena von Schlebrügge	Norman Parkinson
December	Joy Weston	Norman Parkinson

=== 1958 ===
Issue	Cover model	Photographer
January	Suzy Parker	Leombruno-Bodi
February		Claude Virgin
March		John Rawlings
April	Marilyn Ambrose	Claude Virgin
May	Mary Jane Russell	Irving Penn
June	Anne St. Marie	Warren Williams
July	Anne St. Marie	Karen Radkai
August	Nancy Egerton	Claude Virgin
September (1)	Nena von Schlebrügge	Norman Parkinson
September (2)	Nena von Schlebrügge	Eugène Vernier
October		Claude Virgin
November	Tye Pagan Grigg	Lord Snowdon
December	Evelyn Tripp	William Klein

=== 1959 ===
Issue	Cover model	Photographer
January	Tye Pagan Grigg	Eugène Vernier
February (1)	Nancy Egerton	Eugène Vernier
February (2)	Jennifer Hocking	Brian Duffy
March	Monique Chevalier	Henry Clarke
April	Georgina Parkinson; Hylda Zinkin	Norman Parkinson
May		Brian Duffy
June	Isabella Albonico	Irving Penn
July	Carmen Dell’Orefice	Norman Parkinson
August		
September	Nena von Schlebrügge	Claude Virgin
October	Mary Donnallen	Don Honeyman
November	Suzanne Kinnear	Norman Parkinson
December	Isabella Albonico	Irving Penn

== 1960s ==
=== 1960 ===
Issue	Cover model	Photographer
January	Lisa Bigelow	Sante Forlano
February (1)	Maggi Eckhardt	Claude Virgin
February (2)		Lord Snowdon
March (1)	Maggi Eckhardt	Claude Virgin
March (2)	Tania Mallet	Norman Parkinson
April	Marie-Lise Grés	Brian Duffy
May	Margaret Brown	Henry Clarke
June	Katherine Pastrie	Irving Penn
July	Katherine Pastrie	Leombruno-Bodi
August	Maggi Eckhardt	Frank Horvat
September (1)	Maggi Eckhardt	Claude Virgin
September (2)		Frances McLaughlin-Gill
October (1)	Enid Boulting	Brian Duffy
October (2)	Judy Dent	Frank Horvat
November		Don Honeyman
December		Brian Duffy

=== 1961 ===
Issue	Cover model	Photographer
January	Anna Carin Bjorck	William Bell
1 February	Wilhelmina Cooper	Henry Clarke
15 February	Enid Boulting	David Bailey
1 March		Henry Clarke
15 March	Penny Knowles	David Bailey
April		Henry Clarke
May	Nena von Schlebrügge	David Bailey
June	Isabella Albonico	William Klein
July	Tania Mallet	Eugène Vernier
August	Penny Knowles	Eugène Vernier
1 September	Sophia Loren	
15 September	Maggi Eckhardt	Claude Virgin
1 October	Tania Mallet	Henry Clarke
15 October	Judy Dent	Frank Horvat
November	Penny Knowles	Eugène Vernier
December	Deborah Dixon	Henry Clarke

=== 1962 ===
Issue	Cover model	Photographer
January	Tamara Nyman	Henry Clarke
1 February	Enid Boulting	Terence Donovan
15 February	Maggi Eckhardt	Brian Duffy
1 March	Penny Knowles	Claude Virgin
15 March	Marie-Lise Grès	Eugène Vernier
April	Anne St. Marie	Claude Virgin
May	Dolores Hawkins	Peter Carapetian
June	Jean Shrimpton	David Bailey
July	Tania Mallet	Henry Clarke
August	Grace Coddington	Peter Carapetian
1 September	Grace Coddington	Peter Rand
15 September	Jean Shrimpton	David Bailey
1 October	Enid Boulting	Henry Clarke
15 October	Jean Shrimpton	David Bailey
November		Gladys Perrint
December	Marie-Lise Grés	Peter Rand

=== 1963 ===
Issue	Cover model	Photographer
January	Anne Gunning	Henry Clarke
1 February	Sandra Paul	Peter Rand
15 February		Tod Draz
1 March	Jean Shrimpton	David Bailey
15 March	Suzy Parker	Henry Clarke
April	Tania Mallet	Maurice Pascal
May	Jean Shrimpton	William Klein
June	Sandra Paul	Peter Rand
July	Marie-Lise Grés	Henry Clarke
August	Jean Shrimpton	Brian Duffy
1 September	Tamara Nyman	Henry Clarke
15 September	Lady James Crichton-Stuart	Claude Virgin
1 October	Tania Mallet	Brian Duffy
15 October	Tamara Nyman	Ronald Traeger
November		Brian Duffy
December	Ina Balke	Jeanloup Sieff

=== 1964 ===
Issue	Cover model	Photographer
January	Paulene Stone	Brian Duffy
February		Robert Freson
March	Brigitte Bauer	Helmut Newton
1 April	Jean Shrimpton	David Bailey
15 April	Tania Mallet	David Bailey
May	Sandra Paul	David Bailey
June	Princess Laudomia Hercolani	Leombruno-Bodi
July		Ronald Traeger
August	Paulene Stone	Helmut Newton
1 September	Tamara Nyman	Henry Clarke
15 September	Jean Shrimpton	Peter Knapp
1 October	Béatrice Delëtang	David Bailey
15 October	Daliah Lavi	David Bailey
November	Jane Holzer	David Bailey
December	Sue Murray	David Bailey

=== 1965 ===
Issue	Cover model	Photographer
January	Jean Shrimpton	Brian Duffy
February	Sue Murray	David Bailey
1 March	Beate Schultz	Norman Parkinson
15 March	Marie Lise Gries	Henry Clarke
April (1)	Sue Murray	David Bailey
April (2)	Sue Murray	David Bailey
May	Sue Murray	David Bailey
June	Jean Shrimpton	David Bailey
July	Sophia Loren	David Bailey
August	Jill Kennington	David Bailey
1 September	Marika Green	Norman Parkinson
15 September	Sue Murray; Jill Kennington; Moyra Swan	David Bailey
1 October	Monica Vitti	David Bailey
15 October	Vicki Hilbert	Norman Parkinson
November	Jean Shrimpton	David Bailey
December	Elsa Martinelli	David Bailey

=== 1966 ===
Issue	Cover model	Photographer
January	Vicki Hilbert	Norman Parkinson
February	Veruschka	David Bailey
1 March	Donyale Luna	David Bailey
15 March	Lady Antonia Fraser	Norman Parkinson
1 April	Sue Murray	David Bailey
15 April	Ursula Andress	Brian Duffy
May	Celia Hammond	David Bailey
June	Britt Ekland	David Bailey
July	Jean Shrimpton	Brian Duffy
August	Jean Shrimpton	Norman Parkinson
1 September	Celia Hammond	David Bailey
15 September	Maud Adams	Saul Leiter
1 October	Jill Kennington	Saul Leiter
15 October	Donna Mitchell	David Bailey
November	Donna Mitchell	David Bailey
December	Celia Hammond	David Bailey

=== 1967 ===
Issue	Cover model	Photographer
January	Natalie Wood	David Bailey
February	Celia Hammond	David Bailey
1 March	Jean Shrimpton	David Bailey
15 March	Jean Shrimpton	David Bailey
1 April	Catherine Deneuve	David Bailey
15 April	Nicole de Lamargé	David Bailey
May	Celia Hammond	David Bailey
June	Celia Hammond	David Bailey
July	Jean Shrimpton	Brian Duffy
August	Jean Shrimpton	David Bailey
1 September	Celia Hammond	Ronald Traeger
15 September	Willy van Rooy	David Bailey
1 October	Celia Hammond	Ronald Traeger
15 October	Twiggy	Ronald Traeger
November	Sue Murray	David Bailey
December	Candice Bergen	David Bailey

=== 1968 ===
Issue	Cover model	Photographer
January	Sue Murray	David Bailey
February	Celia Hammond	David Bailey
1 March	Annabella Pearson-Gee	David Bailey
15 March	Sue Murray	David Bailey
1 April	Celia Hammond	Henry Clarke
15 April	Celia Hammond	Just Jaeckin
May	Faye Dunaway	Jerry Schatzberg
June	Gayle Hunnicutt	David Bailey
July	Ingrid Boulting	David Bailey
August	Moyra Swan	Henry Clarke
1 September	Marisa Berenson	David Bailey
15 September	Maudie James	David Bailey
1 October	Celia Hammond	David Bailey
15 October	Lesley Jones	Barry Lategan
November	Moyra Swan	David Bailey
December	Lesley Jones	Barry Lategan

=== 1969 ===
Issue	Cover model	Photographer
January	Jean Shrimpton	David Bailey
February	Veruschka	Irving Penn
1 March	Sue Murray	David Bailey
15 March	Maudie James	David Bailey
1 April	Lesley Jones	David Bailey
15 April	Maudie James	Barry Lategan
May	Moyra Swan	David Bailey
June	Ingmari Lamy	Barry Lategan
July	Marisa Berenson	Barry Lategan
August	Pattie Boyd	David Bailey
1 September	Britt Ekland	Barry Lategan
15 September	Jean Shrimpton	David Bailey
1 October	Maudie James	Guy Bourdin
15 October	Pattie Boyd	Barry Lategan
November	Maudie James	Barry Lategan
December	Pattie Boyd	Barry Lategan

== 1970s ==
=== 1970 ===
Issue	Cover model	Photographer
January	Jan Ward	David Bailey
February	Maudie James	Guy Bourdin
1 March	Maudie James	Clive Arrowsmith
15 March	Moyra Swan	David Bailey
1 April	Jean Shrimpton	Barry Lategan
15 April	Gunilla Lindblad	Clive Arrowsmith
May	Jean Shrimpton	David Bailey
June	Maudie James	Clive Arrowsmith
July	Marisa Berenson; Helmut Berger	David Bailey
August	Ann Schaufus	David Bailey
1 September	Mouche	Clive Arrowsmith
15 September	Charlotte Rampling	Clive Arrowsmith
1 October	Ann Schaufus	Clive Arrowsmith
15 October	Maudie James	Barry Lategan
November	Jean Shrimpton	Clive Arrowsmith
December	Ann Schaufus	Clive Arrowsmith

=== 1971 ===
Issue	Cover model	Photographer
January	Jan Ward	Norman Parkinson
February	Sue Baloo	Barry Lategan
1 March	Florence Lafuma	Barry Lategan
15 March	Maudie James; Alan Bates	Barry Lategan
1 April	Audrey Hepburn	Henry Clarke
15 April	Louise Despointes	Barry Lategan
May	Ann Turkel	Patrick Lichfield
June	Ingrid Boulting	David Bailey
July	Mona Kristensen	David Hamilton
August	Cathee Dahmen	Barry Lategan
1 September	Anne, Princess Royal	Norman Parkinson
15 September	Maudie James	Patrick Hunt
1 October	Susan Moncur	Peter Knapp
15 October	Apollonia van Ravenstein	Peter Knapp
November	Christiana Steidten	Peter Knapp
December	Apollonia van Ravenstein	Christa Peters

=== 1972 ===
Issue	Cover model	Photographer
January	Apollonia van Ravenstein	Clive Arrowsmith
February	Ingmari Lamy	Barry Lategan
1 March	Grace Kelly	Lord Snowdon
15 March	Susan Moncur	Barry Lategan
April	Gunilla Lindblad	Barry Lategan
May	Margaret Broderick	Arnaud de Rosnay
June	Donna Mitchell	David Bailey
July	Ingrid Boulting	David Bailey
August	Ingmari Lamy	Barry Lategan
1 September	Twiggy	Barry Lategan
15 September	Sue Baloo	David Bailey
1 October	Pilar Crespi	Gianni Pennati
15 October	Susan Moncur	Norman Parkinson
November	Susan Moncur	Norman Parkinson
December	Ingrid Boulting	Norman Parkinson

=== 1973 ===
Issue	Cover model	Photographer
January	Isa Stoppi	Alfa Castaldi
February	Susan Moncur	David Bailey
1 March	Donna Mitchel	Barry Lategan
15 March	Ingmari Lamy	David Bailey
1 April	Twiggy	Justin de Villeneuve
15 April	Susan Moncur	David Bailey
May	Anne, Princess Royal	Brian Aris
June	Maudie James	David Bailey
July	Judi Bowker	Lord Snowdon
August	Ingmari Lamy	David Bailey
1 September	Liza Minnelli	Peter Sellers
15 September	Ingmari Lamy	David Bailey
1 October	Marisa Berenson	Helmut Newton
15 October	Lynn Woodruff	Barry Lategan
November	Anne, Princess Royal	Norman Parkinson
December	Eve Nielsen	Barry Lategan

=== 1974 ===
Issue	Cover model	Photographer
January	Anjelica Huston; Manolo Blahnik	David Bailey
February	Angelina	Norman Parkinson
1 March	Bianca Jagger	Eric Boman
15 March	Moria Casán	Eric Boman
1 April	Ann Schaufus	David Bailey
15 April	Eva Maelstrom	Norman Parkinson
May	Marie Helvin	David Bailey
June	Marie Helvin	David Bailey
July	Karen Bjornson	David Bailey
August	Christiana Steidten	Oliviero Toscani
1 September	Dominique Sanda	Helmut Newton
15 September	Jacqueline Bisset	David Bailey
1 October	Denise Hopkins	Oliviero Toscani
15 October	Jean Shrimpton	David Bailey
November	Ingrid Boulting	David Bailey
December	Twiggy	Barry Lategan

=== 1975 ===
Issue	Cover model	Photographer
January	Marie Helvin	David Bailey
February	Jane Goodard	Oliviero Toscani
1 March	Aurore Clément	Oliviero Toscani
15 March	Ingmari Lamy	Oliviero Toscani
1 April	Cheryl Tiegs	Barry Lategan
15 April	Clio Goldsmith	Norman Parkinson
May	Jerry Hall	Norman Parkinson
June	Cheryl Tiegs	David Bailey
July	Jerry Hall	Norman Parkinson
August	Carrie Nygren	Willie Christie
1 September	Margaux Hemingway	Oliviero Toscani
15 September	Aurore Clément	David Bailey
1 October	Anna Andersen	Eric Boman
15 October	Eva Maelstrom	Barry Lategan
November	Jerry Hall	Norman Parkinson
December	Marie Helvin	David Bailey

=== 1976 ===
Issue	Cover model	Photographer
January	Jerry Hall	Norman Parkinson
February	Marie Helvin	David Bailey
1 March	Heloïse	Willie Christie
15 March	Susana Giménez	Oliviero Toscani
1 April	Sue Purdey	David Bailey
15 April	Debbie Dickinson	Alex Chatelain
May	Marie Helvin	David Bailey
June	Clare Park	Barry Lategan
July	Jerry Hall	Barry Lategan
August	Moyra Swan	David Bailey
1 September	Marcie Hunt	Barry Lategan
15 September	Margaux Hemingway	Barry Lategan
1 October	Carrie Nygren	Lothar Schmid
15 October		James Mortimer
November	Vibeke Knudsen	David Bailey
December	Marcie Hunt	David Bailey

=== 1977 ===
Issue	Cover model	Photographer
January	Claire Beresford	Barry Lategan
February	Marcie Hunt	Willie Christie
March (1)	Marcie Hunt	Willie Christie
March (2)	Marcie Hunt	Willie Christie
April (1)	Rachel Ward	Willie Christie
April (2)	Beska Sorensen	Eric Boman
May	Clare Beresford	Willie Christie
June		Barry Lategan
July	Carrie Nygren	Willie Christie
August	Kirsti Toscani	Oliviero Toscani
September (1)	Marcie Hunt	Fouli Elia
September (2)	Kirsti Toscani	Alex Chatelain
October (1)	Carrie Nygren	Willie Christie
October (2)	Saki Reid	Eric Boman
November	Marcie Hunt	Lothar Schmidt
December	Dominique Hamonière	Albert Watson

=== 1978 ===
Issue	Cover model	Photographer
January	Juli Foster	Albert Watson
February	Juli Foster	Albert Watson
March (1)	Patty Oja	Barry Lategan
March (2)	Michelle Stevens	Barry Lategan
April (1)	Margie Swearingen	Albert Watson
April (2)	Margie Swearingen	Albert Watson
May	Michelle Stevens	Alex Chatelain
June	Linda Hutton	Albert Watson
July	Janice Dickinson	Mike Reinhardt
August	Shaun Casey	Albert Watson
September (1)	Kelly Le Brock	Albert Watson
September (2)	Kimberly James	Lothar Schmid
October (1)	Janice Dickinson	Mike Reinhardt
October (2)	Kelly Emberg	Alex Chatelain
November	Debbie Dickinson	Mike Reinhardt
December	Kim Alexis	Alex Chatelain

=== 1979 ===
Issue	Cover model	Photographer
January	Debbie Dickinson	Mike Reinhardt
February	Tara Shannon	Barry Lategan
March (1)	Lisa Ryall	Alex Chatelain
March (2)	Janice Dickinson	Mike Reinhardt
April (1)	Gia Carangi	Alex Chatelain
April (2)	Tara Shannon	Albert Watson
May	Christie Brinkley	Alex Chatelain
June	Esmé Marshall	Alex Chatelain
July	Debbie Dickinson	Albert Watson
August	Eva Voorhees	Eric Boman
September (1)	Esmé Marshall	Alex Chatelain
September (2)	Eva Voorhees	Eric Boman
October (1)	Esmé Marshall	Alex Chatelain
October (2)	Janice Dickinson	Mike Reinhardt
November	Kelly Emberg	Alex Chatelain
December	Joe Cates	Mike Reinhardt

== 1980s ==
=== 1980 ===
Issue	Cover model	Photographer
January	Kelly Emberg	Patrick Demarchelier
February	Juli Foster	Albert Watson
March (1)	Carol Alt	Alex Chaletain
March (2)	Linda Hutton	Alex Chaletain
April (1)	Carol Alt	Alex Chaletain
April (2)	Carol Alt	Alex Chaletain
May	Lisa Ryall	Alex Chatelain
June	Nancy Donahue	Eric Boman
July	Nancy DeWeir	Bruce Weber
August	Eva Voorhees	Lorenz Zatecky
September (1)	Terri May	Patrick Demarchelier
September (2)	Lisa Ryall	Patrick Demarchelier
October (1)	Catherine Oxenberg	John Stember
October (2)	Kim Alexis	George Barkentin
November	Nancy Donahue	Eric Boman
December	Marilyn Clark	Alex Chatelain

=== 1981 ===
Issue	Cover model	Photographer
January	Carol Alt	Patrick Demarchelier
February	Lisa Ryall	Patrick Demarchelier
March	Eva Voorhees	Patrick Demarchelier
April	Susan Hess	Arthur Elgort
May	Sloane Condren	Bruce Weber
June	Nancy DeWeir	Barry Lategan
July	Maria Von Hartz	Barry Lategan
August	Lady Diana Spencer	Lord Snowdon
September	Juli Foster	Albert Watson
October	Anette Stai	Patrick Demarchelier
November	Sloane Condren	Barry Lategan
December	Eva Voorhees	Albert Watson

=== 1982 ===
Issue	Cover model	Photographer
January	Jodie Mallinson	Albert Watson
February	Juli Foster	Albert Watson
March	Lisa Ryall	Albert Watson
April	Maria Von Hartz	Eric Boman
May	Jacki Adams	Patrick Demarchelier
June	Jerri Narr	Lord Snowdon
July	Eva Johansson	Albert Watson
August	Phoebe Cates	Rico Puhlmann
September	Lise Brand	Rico Puhlmann
October	Juli Foster	Albert Watson
November	Tara Fitzpatrick	Rico Puhlmann
December	Andie MacDowell	Rico Puhlmann

=== 1983 ===
Issue	Cover model	Photographer
January	Renée Simonsen	Albert Watson
February	Jacki Adams	Mike Reinhardt
March	Nancy DeWier	Rico Puhlmann
April	Vanessa Angel	Terence Donovan
May	Bonnie Berman	Patrick Demarchelier
June	Beth Rupert	Albert Watson
July	Laura Krupinski	Bruce Weber
August	Rosemary McGrotha	Albert Watson
September	Talisa Soto	Patrick Demarchelier
October	Brit Hammer	Albert Watson
November	Kirsten Allen	Rico Puhlmann
December	Talisa Soto	Alex Chatelain

=== 1984 ===
Issue	Cover model	Photographer
January	Tara Fitzpatrick	Albert Watson
February	Lisa Hollenbeck	Patrick Demarchelier
March	Renata Vackova	Rico Puhlmann
April	Elisabetta Ramella	Paolo Roversi
May	Martina Eistman	Rico Puhlmann
June	Suzanne Lanza	Alex Chatelain
July	Isabella Rossellini	Albert Watson
August	Talisa Soto	Albert Watson
September	Talisa Soto	Paul Lange
October	Laetitia Firmin-Didot	Paul Lange
November	Suzanne Lanza	Albert Watson
December	Jose Toledo	Albert Watson

=== 1985 ===
Issue	Cover model	Photographer
January	Kelly Le Brock	Paul Lange
February	Jenna de Rosnay	Rico Puhlmann
March	Alexa Singer	Patrick Demarchelier
April	Michelle Eabry	Patrick Demarchelier
May	Elisabetta Ramella	Albert Watson
June	Jacki Adams	Patrick Demarchelier
July	Alexa Singer	Patrick Demarchelier
August	Lucy Cunningham	Paolo Roversi
September	Yasmin Le Bon	Patrick Demarchelier
October	Tatjana Patitz	Albert Watson
November	Sandra Zatezalo	Patrick Demarchelier
December	Uma Thurman	Patrick Demarchelier

=== 1986 ===
Issue	Cover model	Photographer
January	Linda Speirings	Herb Ritts
February	Talisa Soto	Lord Snowdon
March	Gail O'Neill	Patrick Demarchelier
April	Cecilia Chancellor	Patrick Demarchelier
May	Uma Thurman	Patrick Demarchelier
June	Lisa Kauffmann	Patrick Demarchelier
July	Christy Turlington	Patrick Demarchelier
August	Amanda Pays	Steven Meisel
September	Paulina Porizkova	Patrick Demarchelier
October	Christy Turlington	Patrick Demarchelier
November	Linda Speirings	Patrick Demarchelier
December	Carine Holties	Steven Meisel

=== 1987 ===
Issue	Cover model	Photographer
January	Cindy Crawford	Patrick Demarchelier
February	Cindy Crawford	David Bailey
March	Paulina Porizkova	Patrick Demarchelier
April	Cindy Crawford	Patrick Demarchelier
May	Estelle Lefébure	Patrick Demarchelier
June	Estelle Lefébure	Patrick Demarchelier
July	Christy Turlington	Patrick Demarchelier
August	Yasmin Le Bon	Patrick Demarchelier
September	Paulina Porizkova	Patrick Demarchelier
October	Laetitia Firmin-Didot	Patrick Demarchelier
November	Christy Turlington	David Bailey
December	Naomi Campbell	Patrick Demarchelier

=== 1988 ===
Issue	Cover model	Photographer
January	Cindy Crawford	Patrick Demarchelier
February	Christy Turlington	David Bailey
March	Rachel Williams	David Bailey
April	Christy Turlington	Patrick Demarchelier
May	Estelle Lefébure	Patrick Demarchelier
June	Tatjana Patitz	Herb Ritts
July	Cindy Crawford	Patrick Demarchelier
August	Tully Jensen	Herb Ritts
September	Paulina Porizkova	Patrick Demarchelier
October	Tatjana Patitz	Herb Ritts
November	Tatjana Patitz	Herb Ritts
December	Stephanie Seymour	Herb Ritts

=== 1989 ===
Issue	Cover model	Photographer
January	Linda Evangelista	Peter Lindbergh
February	Madonna	Herb Ritts
March	Tatjana Patitz	Sante D'Orazio
April	Kim Basinger	Herb Ritts
May	Tatjana Patitz	Herb Ritts
June	Carré Otis	Hans Feurer
July	Carré Otis	Herb Ritts
August	Vanessa Duve	Patrick Demarchelier
September	Isabella Rossellini	Steven Meisel
October	Claudia Schiffer	Herb Ritts
November	Tatjana Patitz	Peter Lindbergh
December	Liza Minnelli	Steven Klein

== 1990s ==
=== 1990 ===
Issue	Cover model	Photographer
January	Naomi Campbell; Linda Evangelista; Tatjana Patitz; Christy Turlington; Cindy Crawford	Peter Lindbergh
February	Christy Turlington	Arthur Elgort
March	Helena Christensen	Peter Lindbergh
April	Tatjana Patitz	Patrick Demarchelier
May	Christy Turlington; Linda Evangelista	Patrick Demarchelier
June	Christy Turlington	Arthur Elgort
July	Stephanie Seymour	Sante D'Orazio
August	Helena Christensen	Sante D'Orazio
September	Jade Jagger	Peter Lindbergh
October	Sharron Fisher	Tyen
November	Uma Thurman	Michel Haddi
December	Christy Turlington	Patrick Demarchelier

=== 1991 ===
Issue	Cover model	Photographer
January	Bonnie Berman	Arthur Elgort
February	Linda Evangelista	Patrick Demarchelier
March	Karen Mulder	Patrick Demarchelier
April	Karen Mulder	Tyen
May	Stephanie Seymour	Sante D'Orazio
June	Linda Evangelista; Christy Turlington; Cindy Crawford	Herb Ritts
July	Christy Turlington	Sante D'Orazio
August	Linda Evangelista	Patrick Demarchelier
September	Linda Evangelista	Javier Vallhonrat
October	Linda Evangelista	Patrick Demarchelier
November	Alexandra Aubin	Hans Feurer
December	Diana, Princess of Wales	Patrick Demarchelier

=== 1992 ===
Issue	Cover model	Photographer
January	Claudia Mason; Nadja Auermann; Eva Herzigová; Beverly Peele; Petra Lindblad	Peter Lindbergh
February	Christy Turlington	Javier Vallhonrat
March	Claudia Mason	David Bailey
April	Donna Bunte	Eric Boman
May	Tatjana Patitz	Sheila Metzner
June	Sharon Stone	Arthur Elgort
July	Karen Mulder	Sante D'Orazio
August	Geena Davis	Peggy Sirota
September	Linda Evangelista	Peter Lindbergh
October	Tatjana Patitz	Max Vadukul
November	Helena Christensen	Max Vadukul
December	Christy Turlington; Bono	Andrew MacPherson

=== 1993 ===
Issue	Cover model	Photographer
January	Christy Turlington	Mario Testino
February	Nadja Auermann	Mario Testino
March	Kate Moss	Corinne Day
April	Anja Kneller	Neil Kirk
May	Tatjana Patitz	Mikael Jansson
June	Claudia Mason	Sante D'Orazio
July	Christy Turlington	Andrew MacPherson
August	Carla Bruni	Neil Kirk
September	Christy Turlington	Mario Testino
October	Meghan Douglas	Neil Kirk
November	Linda Evangelista	Nick Knight
December	Helena Christensen	Nick Knight

=== 1994 ===
Issue	Cover model	Photographer
January	Uma Thurman	Albert Watson
February	Winona Ryder	Ellen von Unwerth
March	Beri Smither	Albert Watson
April	Tereza Maxová	Neil Kirk
May	Karen Mulder	Pascal Chevalier
June	Helena Christensen; Tatjana Patitz	Fabrizio Ferri
July	Diana, Princess of Wales	Patrick Demarchelier
August	Kate Moss	Juergen Teller
September	Nadja Auermann	Nick Knight
October	Linda Evangelista	Juergen Teller
November	Linda Evangelista	Nick Knight
December	Amber Valletta; Kate Moss; Nadja Auermann	Nick Knight

=== 1995 ===
Issue	Cover model	Photographer
January	Kate Moss	Nick Knight
February	Meghan Douglas	Mario Testino
March	Amber Valletta	Nick Knight
April	Shalom Harlow	Mario Testino
May	Shalom Harlow; Amber Valletta	Nick Knight
June	Helena Christensen	Neil Kirk
July	Christy Turlington	Kelly Klein
August	Elizabeth Hurley	Nick Knight
September	Trish Goff	Regan Cameron
October	Kate Moss	Wayne Maser
November	Claudia Schiffer	Miles Aldridge
December	Cindy Crawford	Arthur Elgort

=== 1996 ===
Issue	Cover model	Photographer
January	Christy Turlington	Miles Aldridge
February	Amber Valletta	Miles Aldridge
March	Helena Bonham Carter	Kim Knott
April	Kate Moss	Miles Aldridge
May	Amber Valletta	Mario Testino
June	Naomi Campbell	Robert Erdmann
July	Claudia Schiffer	Regan Cameron
August	Christy Turlington	Regan Cameron
September	Georgina Grenville	Mario Testino
October	Sandra Bullock	Mario Testino
November	Linda Evangelista	Regan Cameron
December	Amber Valletta	Regan Cameron

=== 1997 ===
Issue	Cover model	Photographer
January	Patsy Kensit	Regan Cameron
February	Annie Morton	Regan Cameron
March	Georgina Grenville	Regan Cameron
April	Elsa Benítez	Regan Cameron
May	Linda Evangelista	Mario Testino
June	Amber Valletta	Nick Knight
July	Helena Christensen	Raymond Meier
August	Georgina Grenville	Regan Cameron
September	Amber Valletta	Mario Testino
October	Diana, Princess of Wales	Patrick Demarchelier
November	Kate Moss	Tom Munro
December	Stella Tennant	Tom Munro

=== 1998 ===
Issue	Cover model	Photographer
January	Naomi Campbell	Regan Cameron
February	Gwyneth Paltrow	Mario Testino
March	Georgina Grenville	Kelly Klein
April	Eva Herzigová	Pamela Hanson
May	Carolyn Murphy	Tom Munro
June	Kate Moss	Nick Knight
July	Amber Valletta	Raymond Meier
August	Gisele Bündchen	Raymond Meier
September	Angela Lindvall; Bridget Hall; Carolyn Murphy	Tom Munro
October	Amber Valletta	Raymond Meier
November	Kate Moss	David Sims
December	Nicole Kidman	Tom Munro

=== 1999 ===
Issue	Cover model	Photographer
January	Linda Evangelista	Raymond Meier
February	Eva Herzigová	Regan Cameron
March	Amber Valletta	Raymond Meier
April	Kate Moss	Nick Knight
May	Elizabeth Hurley	Mario Testino
June	Angela Lindvall	Tom Munro
July	Frankie Rayder; Liisa Winkler	Mario Testino
August	Natalie Portman	Regan Cameron
September	Gisele Bündchen	Mario Testino
October	Carolyn Murphy	Mario Testino
November	Frankie Rayder; Eva Herzigová	Terry Richardson
December		

== 2000s ==
=== 2000 ===
Issue	Cover model	Photographer
January	Gisele Bündchen	Tom Munro
February	Kate Moss	Mario Testino
March	Gisele Bündchen	Tom Munro
April	Ana Cláudia Michels	Tom Munro
May	Kate Moss	Sarah Morris
June	Liberty Ross	Enrique Badulescu
July	Amy Lemons	Mario Testino
August	Lady Helen Taylor	Mario Testino
September	Kate Moss	Nick Knight
October	Gisele Bündchen; Robbie Williams	Mario Testino
November	Elizabeth Hurley	Vincent Peters
December	Kate Moss	Nick Knight

=== 2001 ===
Issue	Cover model	Photographer
January	Małgosia Bela; Carmen Kass; Ana Cláudia Michels; Frankie Rayder; Angela Lindvall	Mario Testino
February	Naomi Campbell	Mario Testino
March	Catherine Zeta-Jones	Regan Cameron
April	Gisele Bündchen	Nick Knight
May	Karolína Kurková	Richard Burbridge
June	Kylie Minogue	Vincent Peters
July	Gisele Bündchen	Nick Knight
August	Nataša Vojnović	Mario Testino
September	Gisele Bündchen	Richard Burbridge
October	Naomi Campbell; Puff Daddy	Mario Testino
November	Carmen Kass	Richard Burbridge
December	Kate Moss	Nick Knight

=== 2002 ===
Issue	Cover model	Photographer
January	Stella Tennant; Cecilia Chancellor; Erin O'Connor; Jacquetta Wheeler; Naomi Campbell; Liberty Ross; Kate Moss; Elizabeth Jagger; Jade Parfitt; Rosemary Ferguson; Jasmine Guinness; Lisa Ratcliffe; Karen Elson; Georgina Cooper; Alek Wek; Sophie Dahl; Vivien Solari; Jodie Kidd	Mario Testino
February	Penélope Cruz	Regan Cameron
March	Gisele Bündchen	Thomas Schenk
April	Nicole Kidman	Regan Cameron
May	Sophie Dahl	Bert Stern
June	Gisele Bündchen	Corinne Day
July	Bridget Hall	Regan Cameron
August	Naomi Campbell	Corinne Day
September	Jade Jagger	Regan Cameron
October	Gwyneth Paltrow	Mario Testino
November	Amanda Holden; Hermione Norris; Tamzin Outhwaite; Ulrika Jonsson	Lee Jenkins
November	Carolyn Murphy	Regan Cameron
December	Elizabeth Hurley; Elton John	Mario Testino

=== 2003 ===
Issue	Cover model	Photographer
January	Kate Winslet	Regan Cameron
February	Sophie Dahl	Nick Knight
March	Nataša Vojnović	Nick Knight
April	Angela Lindvall	Mario Testino
May	Kate Moss	Nick Knight
June	Salma Hayek	Regan Cameron
July	Anne Vyalitsyna	Regan Cameron
August	Stella Tennant	Corinne Day
September	Natalia Vodianova	Mario Testino
October	Sarah Jessica Parker	Mark Seliger
November	Elizabeth Hurley	Mario Testino
December	Kylie Minogue	Nick Knight

=== 2004 ===
Issue	Cover model	Photographer
January	Natalia Vodianova	Tesh
February	Cate Blanchett	Tesh
March	Natalia Vodianova	Mario Testino
April	Lily Cole; Gemma Ward	Nick Knight
May	Scarlett Johansson	Corinne Day
June	Gisele Bündchen	Carter Smith
July	Keira Knightley	Tesh
August	Carolyn Murphy	Mario Testino
September	Kate Moss	Nick Knight
October	Elle Macpherson	Mario Testino
November	Angela Lindvall	Patrick Demarchelier
December	Sienna Miller	Mario Testino

=== 2005 ===
Issue	Cover model	Photographer
January	Daria Werbowy	Mario Testino
February	Cindy Crawford	Nick Knight
March	Kate Moss	Patrick Demarchelier
April	Gisele Bündchen	Patrick Demarchelier
May	Élise Crombez	Inez & Vinoodh
June	Cate Blanchett	Regan Cameron
July	Lily Cole	Tim Walker
August	Gemma Ward	Mario Testino
September	Kate Moss	Nick Knight
October	Natalie Portman	Corinne Day
November	Stella Tennant	Tim Walker
December	Gwyneth Paltrow	Regan Cameron

=== 2006 ===
Issue	Cover model	Photographer
January	Élise Crombez	Patrick Demarchelier
February	Sienna Miller	Nick Knight
March	Kate Moss	Nick Knight
April	Rachel Weisz	Regan Cameron
May	Natalia Vodianova	Patrick Demarchelier
June	Kate Moss	Craig McDean
July	Gemma Ward	Corinne Day
August	Jessica Stam	Patrick Demarchelier
September	Kate Moss	Nick Knight
October	Scarlett Johansson	Patrick Demarchelier
November	Mischa Barton	Regan Cameron
December		

=== 2007 ===
Issue	Cover model	Photographer
January	Kate Winslet	Regan Cameron
February	Jessica Stam	Liz Collins
March	Daria Werbowy	Nick Knight
April	Kate Moss	Nick Knight
May	Natalia Vodianova; Johnny Borrell	Mario Testino
June	Agyness Deyn	Nick Knight
July	Elizabeth Jagger; Yasmin Le Bon; Cecilia Chancellor; Marie Helvin; Erin O'Connor; Jacquetta Wheeler; Lily Cole	Patrick Demarchelier
August	Drew Barrymore	Regan Cameron
September	Sasha Pivovarova	Craig McDean
October	Keira Knightley	Mario Testino
November	Sophie Dahl	Regan Cameron
December	Sienna Miller	Nick Knight

=== 2008 ===
Issue	Cover model	Photographer
January	Eva Green	Patrick Demarchelier
February	Sasha Pivovarova	Lachlan Bailey
March	Kate Moss	Craig McDean
April	Victoria Beckham	Nick Knight
May	Natalia Vodianova	Mario Testino
June	Agyness Deyn	Patrick Demarchelier
July	Uma Thurman	Regan Cameron
August	Lily Donaldson	Emma Summerton
September	Karen Elson	Nick Knight
October	Kate Moss	Mario Testino
November	Jourdan Dunn; Eden Clark; Rosie Huntington-Whiteley	Emma Summerton
December	Kate Moss	Nick Knight

=== 2009 ===
Issue	Cover model	Photographer
January	Cate Blanchett	Patrick Demarchelier
February	Cheryl Cole	Regan Cameron
March	Lily Donaldson	Nick Knight
April	Claudia Schiffer	Patrick Demarchelier
May	Daria Werbowy	Mario Testino
June	Natalia Vodianova	Mario Testino
July	Julianne Moore	Alasdair McLellan
August	Sasha Pivovarova	Patrick Demarchelier
September	Kate Moss	Mario Testino
October	Sienna Miller	Mario Testino
November	Georgia May Jagger	Mario Testino
December	Lara Stone	Mario Testino

== 2010s ==
=== 2010 ===
Issue	Cover model	Photographer
January	Rachel Weisz	Tom Craig
February	Natalia Vodianova	Nick Knight
March	Alexa Chung	Alasdair McLellan
April	Kate Moss	Willy Vanderperre
May	Gwyneth Paltrow	Mario Testino
June	Angela Lindvall	Tom Craig
July	Cameron Diaz	Regan Cameron
August	Freja Beha Erichsen	Josh Olins
September	Kate Moss	Patrick Demarchelier
October	Cheryl Cole	Patrick Demarchelier
November	Lara Stone	Alasdair McLellan
December	Emma Watson	Mario Testino

=== 2011 ===
Issue	Cover model	Photographer
January	Keira Knightley	Mario Testino
February	Victoria Beckham	Alasdair McLellan
March	Rosie Huntington-Whiteley	Mert & Marcus
April	Kate Winslet	Mario Testino
May	Freja Beha Erichsen; Lara Stone; Natalia Vodianova	Mario Testino
June	Alexa Chung	Josh Olins
July	Vanessa Paradis	Mario Testino
August	Kate Moss	Mario Testino
September	Freja Beha Erichsen	Mario Testino
October	Adele	Sølve Sundsbø
November	Rihanna	Alasdair McLellan
December	Gisele Bündchen	Mario Testino

=== 2012 ===
Issue	Cover model	Photographer
January	Florence Welch	Mario Testino
February	Arizona Muse	Patrick Demarchelier
March	Lana Del Rey	Mario Testino
April	Sienna Miller	Ryan McGinley
May	Charlize Theron	Patrick Demarchelier
June	Kate Moss	Mert & Marcus
July	Rachel Weisz	Alasdair McLellan
August	Emma Stone	Patrick Demarchelier
September	Karlie Kloss	Nick Knight
October	Kristen Stewart	Mario Testino
November	Jennifer Lawrence	Alasdair McLellan
December	Natalia Vodianova	Mario Testino

=== 2013 ===
Issue	Cover model	Photographer
January	Kate Upton	Alasdair McLellan
February	Kati Nescher	Patrick Demarchelier
March	Cara Delevingne	Mario Testino
April	Edie Campbell	David Sims
May	Beyoncé	Arthur Elgort
June	Kate Moss	Patrick Demarchelier
July	Helena Bonham Carter	Mert & Marcus
August	Freja Beha Erichsen	Patrick Demarchelier
September	Daria Werbowy	Patrick Demarchelier
October	Alexa Chung	Patrick Demarchelier
November	Claire Danes	Nathaniel Goldberg
December	Kate Moss	Tim Walker

=== 2014 ===
Issue	Cover model	Photographer
January	Cara Delevingne	Alasdair McLellan
February	Georgia May Jagger	Patrick Demarchelier
March	Daria Werbowy	Mario Testino
April	Nigella Lawson	Nathaniel Goldberg
May	Kate Moss	Craig McDean
June	Kate Upton	Mario Testino
July	Christy Turlington	Patrick Demarchelier
August	Victoria Beckham	Patrick Demarchelier
September	Cara Delevingne	Mario Testino
October	Rosamund Pike	Alasdair McLellan
November	Taylor Swift	Mario Testino
December	Kate Moss	Mario Testino

=== 2015 ===
Issue	Cover model	Photographer
January	Freja Beha Erichsen	Alasdair McLellan
February	Jourdan Dunn	Patrick Demarchelier
March	Gisele Bündchen	Mario Testino
April	Georgia May Jagger; Cara Delevingne; Suki Waterhouse	Mario Testino
May	Emilia Clarke	Paolo Roversi
June	Anna Ewers	Patrick Demarchelier
July	Stella Tennant	Craig McDean
August	Lara Stone	Mario Testino
September	Emma Watson	Josh Olins
October	Sienna Miller	Mario Testino
November	Léa Seydoux	Craig McDean
December	Karlie Kloss	Patrick Demarchelier

=== 2016 ===
Issue	Cover model	Photographer
January	Gigi Hadid	Patrick Demarchelier
February	Dakota Johnson	Alasdair McLellan
March	Edie Campbell	Mario Testino
April	Rihanna	Craig McDean
May	Kate Moss	Craig McDean
June	Catherine Middleton	Josh Olins
July	Renée Zellweger	Patrick Demarchelier
August	Alicia Vikander	Alasdair McLellan
September	Cara Delevingne	Mario Testino
October	Victoria Beckham	Lachlan Bailey
November	Emily Blunt	Josh Olins
December	Lily-Rose Depp	Bruce Weber

=== 2017 ===
Issue	Cover model	Photographer
January	Ashley Graham	Patrick Demarchelier
February	Imaan Hammam; Taylor Hill; Anna Ewers	Patrick Demarchelier
March	Gigi Hadid	Mario Testino
April	Kate Moss	Mert & Marcus
May	Amber Valletta	Lachlan Bailey
June	Alexa Chung	Mario Testino
July	Carolyn Murphy	Inez & Vinoodh
August	Mica Argañaraz	Craig McDean
September	Lady Jean Campbell; Edie Campbell; Nora Attal; Stella Tennant; Kate Moss	Mario Testino
October	Zoë Kravitz	Alasdair McLellan
November	Claire Foy	Craig McDean
December	Adwoa Aboah	Steven Meisel

=== 2018 ===
Issue	Cover model	Photographer
January	Taylor Swift	Mert & Marcus
February	Bella Hadid; Gigi Hadid	Steven Meisel
March	Gugu Mbatha-Raw	Mikael Jansson
April	Vittoria Ceretti; Halima Aden; Adut Akech; Faretta; Paloma Elsesser; Radhika Nair; Yoon Young Bae; Fran Summers; Selena Forrest	Craig McDean
May	Cara Delevingne	Steven Meisel
June	Ariana Grande	Craig McDean
July	Oprah Winfrey	Mert & Marcus
August	Rihanna	Nick Knight
September	Harper Beckham; Romeo Beckham; Victoria Beckham; Cruz Beckham; Brooklyn Beckham	Mikael Jansson
October	Fran Summers	Inez & Vinoodh
November	Adut Akech; Primrose Archer; Saffron Vadher; Stella Tennant	Steven Meisel
December		

=== 2019 ===
Issue	Cover model	Photographer
January	Dua Lipa	Nadine Ijewere
February	Emma Stone	Craig McDean
March	Naomi Campbell	Steven Meisel
April	Naomi Scott	Nick Knight
May	Kate Moss	Inez & Vinoodh; Jamie Hawkesworth; Mikael Jansson
June	Madonna	Mert & Marcus
July	Zoë Kravitz	Steven Meisel
August	Karlie Kloss	Steven Meisel
September	Adut Akech; Gemma Chan; Greta Thunberg; Francesca Hayward; Chimamanda Ngozi Adichie; Adwoa Aboah; Jacinda Ardern; Jameela Jamil; Ramla Ali; Christy Turlington; Salma Hayek; Sinéad Burke; Jane Fonda; Laverne Cox; Yara Shahidi	Peter Lindbergh
October	Kaia Gerber	Steven Meisel
November	Jourdan Dunn	Nick Knight
December	Emma Watson	Alasdair McLellan
December	Lizzo	Kloss Films

== 2020s ==
=== 2020 ===
Issue	Cover model	Photographer
January	Taylor Swift	Craig McDean
February	Lupita Nyong'o	Steven Meisel
March	Irina Shayk	Mert & Marcus
April	Jodie Comer	Steven Meisel
May	Rihanna	Steven Klein
June	Judi Dench	Nick Knight
July	Narguis Horsford; Rachel Millar; Anisa Omar	Jamie Hawkesworth
August		
September	Joan Smalls; Janet Mock; Riz Ahmed; Dr. Meenal Viz; Tamika D. Mallory; Jane Elliot; Prof. Angela Davis; Alice Wong; Jesse Williams	Misan Harriman
October	Emma Corrin	Charlotte Wales
November	Serena Williams	Zoë Ghertner
December	Beyoncé	Kennedi Carter

=== 2021 ===
Issue	Cover model	Photographer
January	Kate Moss	Mert & Marcus
February	Dua Lipa	Emma Summerton
March	Angelina Jolie	Craig McDean
April	Achenrin Madit; Precious Lee; Mona Tougaard; Janaye Furman	Steven Meisel
May	Thandiwe Newton	Mikael Jansson
June	Billie Eilish	Craig McDean
July	Malala Yousafzai	Nick Knight
August	Margot Robbie	Lachlan Bailey
September	Gemma Chan	Hanna Moon
October	Zendaya	Craig McDean
November	Adele	Steven Meisel
December	Lady Gaga	Steven Meisel

=== 2022 ===
Issue	Cover model	Photographer
January	Kristen McMenamy	Steven Meisel
February	Adut Akech; Anok Yai; Majesty Amare; Amar Akway; Janet Jumbo; Maty Fall Diba; Nyagua Ruea; Abény Nhial; Akon Changkou	Rafael Pavarotti
March	Naomi Campbell	Steven Meisel
April	Anya Taylor-Joy	Craig McDean
April	Queen Elizabeth II	Anthony Armstrong Jones
May	Lila Moss	Steven Meisel
June	Gisele Bündchen	Steven Meisel
July	Beyoncé	Rafael Pavarotti
August	Cara Delevingne; Cynthia Erivo; Ariana DeBose; Jordan Barrett; Munroe Bergdorf; Sheerah Ravindren; Cameron Lee Phan; Aweng Chuol; Nathan Westling; Valentina Sampaio; Gottmik; Kai Isaiah Jamal	Mert & Marcus
September	Linda Evangelista	Steven Meisel
October	Timothée Chalamet	Steven Meisel
November		
December	Elizabeth Debicki; Simone Ashley; Sienna Miller; Yasmin Finney	Scott Trindle

=== 2023 ===
Issue	Cover model	Photographer
January	Iman	Nadine Ijewere
February	Priyanka Chopra Jonas	Zoë Ghertner
March	Rihanna; A$AP Rocky; RZA Mayers	Inez & Vinoodh
April	Jill Kortleve; Precious Lee; Paloma Elsesser	Inez & Vinoodh
May	Sinéad Burke; Selma Blair; Aaron Rose Philip; Ellie Goldstein; Justina Miles	Adama Jalloh
June	Miley Cyrus	Steven Meisel
July	Miriam Margolyes; Janelle Monáe; Rina Sawayama	Tim Walker
August	Maya Jama	Steven Meisel
September	Linda Evangelista; Naomi Campbell; Cindy Crawford; Christy Turlington	Rafael Pavarotti
October	Lily Gladstone; Leonardo DiCaprio	Craig McDean
November	Emily Ratajkowski; Adwoa Aboah	Sean Thomas
November	Irina Shayk; Adut Akech	Sean Thomas
November	Karen Elson; Mona Tougaard	Sean Thomas
December	Olivia Colman	Tim Walker
December	Stormzy	Tim Walker
December	Kate Moss, Lila Moss	Tim Walker
December	Little Simz	Tim Walker
December	Jodie Comer	Tim Walker
December	Tilda Swinton	Tim Walker

=== 2024 ===
Issue	Cover model	Photographer
January	Emma Watson	Charlotte Wales
January	Tolu Coker; Torishéju Dumi; Priya Ahluwalia	Charlotte Wales
January	Amber Valletta	Charlotte Wales
February	Julia Roberts	Lachlan Bailey
March	Adwoa Aboah; Adut Akech; Simone Ashley; Victoria Beckham; Selma Blair; Naomi Campbell; Vittoria Ceretti; Gemma Chan; Jodie Comer; Laverne Cox; Cindy Crawford; Miley Cyrus; Ariana DeBose; Cara Delevingne; Jourdan Dunn; Paloma Elsesser; Karen Elson; Cynthia Erivo; Linda Evangelista; Jane Fonda; Kaia Gerber; Gigi Hadid; Salma Hayek; Iman; Maya Jama; Jameela Jamil; Karlie Kloss; Precious Lee; Dua Lipa; Gugu Mbatha-Raw; Kate Moss; Lila Moss; Rina Sawayama; Irina Shayk; Anya Taylor-Joy; Christy Turlington; Amber Valletta; Serena Williams; Oprah Winfrey; Anok Yai	Steven Meisel
April	FKA Twigs	Johnny Dufort
May	Zendaya	Carlijn Jacobs
June	Sophie Turner	Mikael Jansson
July	Mona Tougaard; Central Cee	Alasdair McLellan
August	Suki Waterhouse	Colin Dodgson
September	Kylie Jenner	Luis Alberto Rodriguez
October	Florence Pugh	Venetia Scott
November	Saoirse Ronan	Jack Davison
December	SZA	Nadine Ijewere

=== 2025 ===
Issue	Cover model	Photographer
January	Angelina Kendall	Mikael Jansson
February	Renée Zellweger	Nikolai von Bismarck
March	Tyla	Rafael Pavarotti
April	Bella Ramsey	Paolo Roversi
May	Billie Eilish	Johnny Dufort
June	Bella Hadid	Steven Meisel
July	Dua Lipa	David Sims
August	Doechii	Elizaveta Porodina
September	Michaela Coel	Harley Weir
October	Raye	Malick Bodian
November	Gwyneth Paltrow	Venetia Scott
December	Millie Bobby Brown	Sebastián Faena

=== 2026 ===
Issue	Cover model	Photographer
January	Margot Robbie	Mikael Jansson
February	Jessie Buckley	Jack Davison
March	Bhavitha Mandava	Oliver Hadlee Pearch
April	Olivia Rodrigo	Laura Jane Coulson
May	Charli XCX	Laura Snapes
June	Anok Yai	Rafael Pavarotti
July	Zoë Kravitz	Mikael Jansson
August	Daisy Edgar-Jones	Szilveszter Makó
September	Nicole Kidman	Venetia Scott
October	Wunmi Mosaku	Dan Jackson
November	Lola Young	Mel Bles
December	Jude Bellingham	Alasdair McLellan
