= Nyagua Ruea =

South Sudanese fashion model (born 2001)

- Born: December 15, 2001 (age 24)
- Modeling information
- Height: 1.78 m (5 ft 10 in)
- Hair color: Black
- Eye color: Brown
- Agency: Supreme Management (New York); Women/360 (Paris); Monster Management (Milan); Elite Model Management (London)

Nyagua Ruea (born December 15, 2001) is a South Sudanese-Kenyan fashion model. Born and raised in Kenya, she appeared on the cover of the February 2022 issue of British Vogue, the magazine's first cover with an all-Black cast of models. In 2022, she was nominated for Breakout Star at Models.com's Model of the Year Awards, and was featured on the site's Hot List before joining its Top 50 Models ranking.

== Early life ==
Ruea was born in Kenya to a South Sudanese family and raised there. Around the ages of nine and ten, she decided she wanted to become a model, researching the industry on her iPad and telling her parents she would pursue it after high school. After seeing online that the agency Beth Models was holding a scouting trip in Kenya, she sent in her photos and was signed the day she met them.

== Career ==
Ruea made her runway debut in 2019. In 2022, she closed her first show, for Dion Lee's Fall/Winter 2022 collection, and was featured in Alexander McQueen's resort 2022 lookbook. Her first cover appearance was for the February 2022 issue of British Vogue, photographed by Rafael Pavarotti and styled by Edward Enninful, featuring an all-African cast that included Anok Yai, Adut Akech, Maty Fall Diba, and Akon Changkou. Later that year, she appeared on the cover of Vogue Czechoslovakia.

Ruea has walked the runway for Saint Laurent, Moschino, Valentino, Mugler, Schiaparelli, Hermès, Balmain, Givenchy, and Chloé. During the Spring/Summer 2023 season, she also walked for Erdem, Nensi Dojaka, Michael Kors, Gabriela Hearst, and Marni, and appeared in the Vogue World show in New York.

She has appeared in editorials for Vogue, W, Vogue España, and Pop. She was also part of Alexander McQueen's Spring/Summer 2023 campaign, photographed by Jonas Åkerlund alongside Naomi Campbell, Sadie Sink, and others.

In 2024, Ruea appeared in the Dolce & Gabbana Beauty Il Pranzo campaign, photographed by Steven Klein and styled by Carine Roitfeld, alongside Irina Shayk and Jerry Hall. The same year, she appeared in an editorial for Vogue Hong Kong and in a campaign for Michael Kors. In 2025, she walked for SRVC and Dilara Fındıkoğlu and appeared in a second Dolce & Gabbana Beauty campaign, again photographed by Klein.

Ruea has spoken about the difficulties of working in the fashion industry as a South Sudanese passport holder, saying that cancelled appointments and delayed visas have cost her jobs. She travels on an O-1 visa for the United States, which she must have restamped each time she leaves the country.
