= Jack Doolan =

Jack Doolan may refer to:

- Jack Doolan (American football) (1919–2002), American football running back
- Jack Doolan (actor) (born 1987), English actor
- Jack Doolan (politician) (1927–1995), Australian politician

== See also ==
- John Doolan (disambiguation)
- Jack Dolan (1906–2001), Australian rules footballer
