= Lost City of the Jungle =

1946 film by Ray Taylor, Lewis D. Collins

- Directed by: Lewis D. Collins; Ray Taylor
- Written by: Joseph F. Poland; Paul Huston; Tom Gibson
- Produced by: Morgan Cox; Joseph O'Donnell
- Starring: Russell Hayden; Jane Adams; Lionel Atwill; Keye Luke
- Cinematography: Gus Peterson
- Edited by: Irving Birnbaum; Jack Dolan; Joseph Gluck; D. Pat Kelley; Alvin Todd; Edgar Zane
- Distributed by: Universal Pictures
- Release date: April 23, 1946
- Running time: 13 chapters (265 minutes)
- Country: United States
- Language: English

Lost City of the Jungle is a 1946 Universal movie serial.

== Plot ==
Recent atom tests show a certain element - Meteorium 245 - as a defense against the atomic bomb. The evil Eric Hazarias (Lionel Atwill) has traced a Meteorium deposit to the Himalayan nation of Pendrang, ruled by casino owner Indra (Helen Bennett). Hazarias fakes his own death and shows up in Pendrang as philanthropist Geoffrey London. With him is Malborn (John Mylong), his faithful secretary who is actually the real mastermind, Hazarias being his decoy. Thus begins a search for Meteorium, under the guise of seeking the lost city of Pendrang. On the trail of Hazarias is United Peace Foundation operative Rod Stanton (Russell Hayden), there to unmask London as Hazarias and put a stop to his evil schemes.

== Cast ==
- Russell Hayden as Rod Stanton, United Peace Foundation operative
- Jane Adams as Marjorie Elmore
- Keye Luke as Tal Shan
- Lionel Atwill as Sir Eric Hazarias/ Geoffrey London
- John Mylong as Malborn, the "real" villain of the serial, posing as Geoffrey London's servant
- George Lynn as Marlow, one of Hazarias' henchmen
- Dick Curtis as Johnson, one of Hazarias' henchmen
- Helen Bennett as Indra
- Ted Hecht as Doc Harris
- John Eldredge as Doctor Elmore
- John Miljan as Doctor Gaffron
- John Gallaudet as Professor Grebb
- Arthur Space as "System" Reeves
- Frances Chung as Lakana Shan
- Gene Roth as Police Captain Hammond

== Production ==
Lionel Atwill was ill and died of lung cancer and pneumonia during the filming of this serial. Atwill had been cast as the mastermind villain, Sir Eric Hazarias, a foreign spy chief. Universal did not want to throw out the footage already filmed of their name star, so they chose to adapt the serial. First, another villain, Malborn, (played by John Mylong), who was originally just a servant of Sir Eric, was reworked to be the boss of Atwill's character and took over most of the active villain requirements of the film. Secondly, a double of Atwill was used to complete additional scenes involving the character Hazarias, seen either wearing a disguise or filmed from behind or at a distance. Thirdly, the script was rewritten so that the character Malborn dominated the first several episodes, with only the disguised Hazarias being seen, while the footage filmed with Atwill as Hazarias, often speaking only a few lines and standing around the set of his cave hideout (because he had been too ill to do much more), was shifted to the last half of the serial and supplemented by lengthy shots of his henchmen describing various of their activities to him.

Lost City of the Jungle was Universal's penultimate serial; the final Universal serial was The Mysterious Mr. M, which was also released in 1946.

== Chapter titles ==
1. Himalaya Horror
2. The Death Flood
3. Wave Length for Doom
4. The Pit of Pendrang
5. Fiery Danger
6. Death's Shining Face
7. Speedboat Missing
8. Fire Jet Torture
9. Zalabar Death Watch
10. Booby Trap Rendezvous
11. Pendrang Guillotine
12. Jungle Smash-up
13. Atomic Vengeance

_{Source:}

== See also ==
- List of film serials
- List of film serials by studio

Preceded by The Scarlet Horsemen (1946)	Universal Serial; Lost City of the Jungle (1946)	Succeeded by The Mysterious Mr. M (1946)
