= Jill Kennington =

British fashion model and photographer (born 1943)

- Born: 2 January 1943 (age 83); Riby, Lincolnshire, England
- Occupations: Fashion model; photographer

Jill Kennington (born 2 January 1943) is a British fashion model and photographer. She is best known to the wider public for her appearance in Michelangelo Antonioni's 1966 film Blow-Up.

== Early life ==
Jill Kennington was born in the village of Riby, Lincolnshire on 2 January 1943. She grew up on a farm there, with two sisters and a brother. She was educated at a boarding school in the Lake District, and a finishing school in Sussex.

== Career ==
At the age of 18, Kennington started at Michael Whittaker's small "school" for aspiring models and after only two days, met Norman Hartnell who was about to do a major UK tour; he declared, "Darling, you are going to be my mascot". She toured as one of Hartnell's models for about a month's time.

Kennington met photographer John Cowan in February 1962 and it was through her work with Cowan that she made her name as a model in the 1960s. Cowan injected action and dynamism into his shoots that had previously been lacking in fashion photography. Work from that period is in the collection of the Victoria and Albert Museum, while work with other photographers, including Norman Parkinson and Lord Lichfield is in the collection of the National Portrait Gallery. She was twice on the front cover of Vogue. Kennington has also worked with the photographers David Bailey, Terence Donovan, Brian Duffy, Helmut Newton, Jeanloup Sieff, Richard Avedon, William Klein, and Bob Richardson.

Kennington discussed her transition from model to photographer in an interview with Vogue in 2013. She continues to work as a model and is represented by TESS Management.

In January 2009 she appeared in the third episode of the BBC Four series Style on Trial and the final episode.

== Personal life ==
She is the daughter of John Kennington, who died in February 1968.

She married film director Roy Rossotti in January 1967. Kennington's second husband is Richard Courtauld, with whom she has two children.
