= The Royal Mounted Rides Again =

1945 film by Ray Taylor, Lewis D. Collins

- Directed by: Lewis D. Collins; Ray Taylor
- Written by: Joseph O'Donnell; Tom Gibson; Harold Channing Wire
- Produced by: Morgan Cox
- Starring: George Dolenz; Bill Kennedy; Daun Kennedy; Paul E. Burns; Milburn Stone; Robert Armstrong
- Cinematography: Jerome Ash; Charles Van Enger
- Edited by: Norman A. Cerf (supervisor); Irving Birnbaum; Jack Dolan; Alvin Todd; Edgar Zane
- Distributed by: Universal Pictures
- Release date: October 23, 1945
- Running time: 13 chapters (221 minutes)
- Country: United States
- Language: English

The Royal Mounted Rides Again is a 1945 Universal Pictures film serial. Actor and popular singing cowboy of the day Jack Randall died during the making of this serial.

== Plot ==
Mine owner Jackson Decker orders his manager to obtain miner Tom Bailey's milling machinery, no matter what the cost. When Bailey is found murdered, suspicion naturally falls on Jackson and his manager. Jackson's son, a Canadian Mountie, is directed to seek out the murderer, or murderers, and bring them to justice.

The Mountie joins forces with a French-Canadian policeman, Bailey's beautiful daughter, and a phony palm reader to learn the truth. The foursome soon discover that there is a secret gold mine, a double crossing casino owner, and a forger at the bottom of the crime.

== Cast ==
- George Dolenz as Constable "Frenchy" Moselle
- Bill Kennedy as Corporal J. Wayne Decker
- Daun Kennedy as June Bailey
- Paul E. Burns as "Latitude" Bucket
- Milburn Stone as Brad Taggart
- Robert Armstrong as Jonathan Price
- Danny Morton as Eddie "Dancer" Clare, Price's dealer
- Addison Richards as Jackson Decker
- Tom Fadden as Lode MacKenzie
- Joe Haworth as Bunker
- Helen Bennett as Dillie Clark aka Madame Mysterioso
- Joseph Crehan as Sergeant Nelson
- Selmer Jackson as Superintendent MacDonald
- Daral Hudson as Sergeant Ladue
- George Lloyd as Kent

== Critical reception ==
Cline claims that The Royal Mounted Rides Again is "pretty close to being the weakest chapter film [Universal] ever made." An excellent cast was wasted and the story "wandered aimlessly [with] almost no suspense."

== Chapter titles ==
1. Canaska [sic] Gold
2. The Avalanche Trap
3. River on Fire
4. Skyline Target
5. Murder Toboggan
6. Ore Car Accident
7. Buckboard Runaway
8. Thundering Water
9. Dead Men for Decoys
10. Derringer Death
11. Night Trail Danger
12. Twenty Dollar Double Cross
13. Flaming Showdown

_{Source:}

== See also ==
- List of film serials
- List of film serials by studio

Preceded by Secret Agent X-9 (1945)	Universal Serial; The Royal Mounted Rides Again (1945)	Succeeded by The Scarlet Horsemen (1946)
