= The Scarlet Horseman =

1946 film by Ray Taylor, Lewis D. Collins

- Theatrical release poster
- Directed by: Lewis D. Collins; Ray Taylor
- Written by: Tom Gibson; Patricia Harper; Joseph O'Donnell
- Produced by: Morgan Cox
- Starring: Peter Cookson; Paul Guilfoyle; Janet Shaw; Virginia Christine
- Cinematography: Jerome Ash; George Robinson
- Edited by: Irving Birnbaum; Jack Dolan; D. Pat Kelley; Alvin Todd; Edgar Zane
- Music by: Milton Rosen
- Distributed by: Universal Pictures
- Release date: January 12, 1946
- Running time: 13 chapters (221 minutes)
- Country: United States
- Language: English

The Scarlet Horseman is a 1946 American Western film serial from Universal Pictures. It is directed by Lewis D. Collins and Ray Taylor. Paul Guilfoyle plays Jim Bannion, secret identity of the Scarlet Horseman, with Janet Shaw as Elise, his love interest. Virginia Christine plays the villainess, Matosca.

== Plot ==
Two Texas Rangers investigate the kidnapping of wives and daughters of Senators. To do so, one goes undercover as the "Scarlet Horseman", a legendary and respected Comanche figure. The villainess, Matosca, intends to use the kidnappees to force a partition of Texas.

== Cast ==
- Peter Cookson as Kirk Norris, a Texas Ranger
- Paul Guilfoyle as Jim Bannion, a Texas Ranger secretly using the identity of the Scarlet Horseman
- Janet Shaw as Elise Halliday, heroine
- Virginia Christine as Carla Marquette, daughter of a discredited senator and secretly the villainous Matosca
- Victoria Horne as Loma
- Cy Kendall as Amigo Mañana
- Edward Howard as Zero Quick
- Harold Goodman as Idaho Jones
- Danny Morton as Ballou, saloon owner
- Helen Bennett as Mrs. Ruth Halliday
- Jack Ingram as Tragg, one of Matosca's henchmen
- Edmund Cobb as Kyle, one of Matosca's henchmen
- Guy Wilkerson as Panhandle, one of Matosca's henchmen
- Al Woods as Senator Mark Halliday
- Fred Coby as Tioga
- Ralph Lewis as Saloon Henchman

== Chapter titles ==
1. Scarlet for a Champion
2. Dry Grass Danger
3. Railroad Rescue
4. Staked Plains Stampede
5. Death Shifts Passengers
6. Stop that Stage
7. Blunderbuss Broadside
8. Scarlet Doublecross
9. Doom Beyond the Door
10. The Edge of Danger
11. Comanche Avalanche
12. Staked Plains Massacre
13. Scarlet Showdown

_{Source:} The opening narration to each chapter was by Milburn ("Gunsmoke") Stone.

== See also ==
- List of film serials
- List of film serials by studio

| Preceded by The Royal Mounted Rides Again (1945) | Universal Serial; The Scarlet Horseman (1946) | Succeeded by Lost City of the Jungle (1946) |
