= Willy van Rooy =

Dutch model, fashion designer and artist (1941–2025)

- Born: April 1, 1941; The Hague, Netherlands
- Died: May 2025 (aged 84)
- Occupations: Model; fashion designer; artist
- Years active: 1960s–2020s
- Spouse: Salvador Marón
- Children: 2
- Website: willyvanrooy.com

Willy van Rooy (1 April 1941 – May 2025) was a Dutch model, fashion designer and artist. As a model, she was active primarily during the 1960s and 1970s. She worked with leading fashion photographers, including Helmut Newton, and modeled for designers such as Yves Saint Laurent, Karl Lagerfeld and Thierry Mugler.

She later designed accessories for Yves Saint Laurent and Karl Lagerfeld before establishing her own shoe line in Spain during the 1980s. She returned to the runway in 2020 for a L'Oréal Paris show at Mercedes-Benz Fashion Week Madrid.

== Early life ==
Willy van Rooy was born on 1 April 1941 in The Hague, Netherlands. Her mother died when she was four, and she subsequently grew up in an orphanage. She later studied at the Academy of Fine Arts in Rotterdam.

After completing her studies, Willy van Rooy moved to Barcelona with the intention of becoming a model. While preparing a portfolio to present to modeling agencies, she was approached in the street by an agent who signed her. She began working as a model in Spain before being contacted by the British edition of Vogue.

== Career ==
=== Modeling ===
While working on a fashion editorial for the British edition of Vogue, Willy van Rooy met photographer Helmut Newton. She subsequently became one of his regular models and also worked with photographers including David Bailey, William Klein and Norman Parkinson.

Van Rooy modeled in London, Paris and New York. She appeared in fashion shows for designers and fashion houses including Yves Saint Laurent, Karl Lagerfeld, Thierry Mugler, Jean Paul Gaultier and Loewe. She was active as a model during the 1960s and 1970s.

=== Fashion design ===
In the late 1970s, she began working as a freelance designer for Yves Saint Laurent and Karl Lagerfeld, producing drawings for bags, shoes, jewelry and fabrics.

Willy van Rooy moved to Spain in 1983, where she designed her own line of shoes. Working from a studio in Madrid, she designed shoes decorated with materials including stones, lace tapestry and brocade.

Her shoes were initially sold in Spain and later in the United States, including in New York and Los Angeles. Her shoes were worn by Cher, Madonna and the Pointer Sisters.

=== Later activities ===
In the 1990s, Willy van Rooy lived in Los Angeles, where she worked for two years as Paula Abdul's personal designer. She also created a jewelry collection. In 1997, she returned to the Netherlands after more than three decades abroad. In the later years of her life, she lived in Oregon, where she continued to design jewelry.

In early 2020, Van Rooy returned to the runway in Madrid for a L'Oréal Paris show held during Mercedes-Benz Fashion Week Madrid. The show featured models over the age of 50. Following the show, she said she would no longer walk the runway, although she remained available for photo shoots. At the time, she was also working on a book about her life.

== Personal life ==
Willy van Rooy met the Canarian painter Salvador Marón during a photographic session with Helmut Newton in 1967. They later married and had a son, Alejandro van Rooy, an illustrator and designer, and a daughter, Alegria. She died in May 2025 at the age of 84.
