= Lillian Frank =

Australian hairdresser (1930–2022)

- Born: Lillian Georgian Jacob; 16 January 1930; Rangoon, Burma
- Died: 12 August 2022 (aged 92); Melbourne, Australia
- Occupations: Hairdresser, socialist

Lillian Georgina Frank AM MBE (née Jacob; 16 January 1930 – 12 August 2022) was a Burmese-born Australian hairdresser, fashion influencer, philanthropist, fundraiser, and society columnist.

== Biography ==
Lillian Georgina Jacob was born in Rangoon, Burma (now Yangon, Myanmar), in 1930. Her family fled to British India during World War II, from where she was sent to live with an aunt in the United Kingdom. She finally settled in Melbourne, Australia, in the 1950s.

She established her first hairdressing salon in the city, and she later opened one in Toorak, Victoria. She became known for her celebrity clientele, including Queen Elizabeth II and Jean Shrimpton. She wrote a gossip column for the Herald Sun for about 40 years.

She married Richard Frank in 1966, and they had two daughters.

Lillian Frank died on 12 August 2022, aged 92.

== Honours ==
- 1977 – Appointed a Member of the Order of the British Empire (MBE), for services to charities (she was highly involved in charities such as the Royal Children's Hospital and Odyssey House, Melbourne)
- 1991 – Appointed a Member of the Order of Australia (AM), for service to the community
- 2001 – Awarded the Centenary Medal, for services to the community through fund-raising and charity
