= Gitta Sereny =

Austrian-British writer and historian (1921–2012)

Gitta Sereny CBE
- Born: 13 March 1921; Vienna, Austria
- Died: 14 June 2012 (aged 91); Cambridge, England, UK
- Occupations: Writer; historian; journalist
- Spouse: Don Honeyman (1948–2011)
- Relatives: Ludwig von Mises (stepfather)
- Writing career
- Language: English
- Genre: Non-fiction
- Subjects: The Holocaust, child abuse, society
- Notable works: The Case of Mary Bell: A Portrait of a Child Who Murdered (1972) "Into That Darkness, an examination of conscience" (1974); Albert Speer: His Battle with Truth (1995)
- Notable awards: Duff Cooper Prize (1995); James Tait Black Memorial Prize (1995); Stig Dagerman Prize (2002); CBE (2004)

Gitta Sereny, CBE (13 March 1921 – 14 June 2012) was an Austrian-British biographer, historian, and investigative journalist who became known for her interviews and profiles of infamous figures, including Mary Bell, who was convicted in 1968 of killing two children when she herself was a child, and Franz Stangl, the commandant of the Treblinka extermination camp.

Born and initially raised in Austria, she was the author of five books, including The Case of Mary Bell: A Portrait of a Child Who Murdered (1972) and Albert Speer: His Battle with Truth (1995).

Sereny was awarded the Duff Cooper Prize and the James Tait Black Memorial Prize for her book on Albert Speer in 1995, and the Stig Dagerman Prize in 2002. She was appointed a Commander of the Order of the British Empire in 2004 for services to journalism.

== Biography ==
Sereny was born in Vienna, Austria, in 1921. Her father was a Hungarian Protestant aristocrat, Ferdinand Serény, who died when she was two. Her mother was a former actress from Hamburg, Margit Herzfeld, of German-Jewish background. Gitta Sereny's stepfather was the economist Ludwig von Mises.

When she was thirteen, her train journey to a boarding school in the United Kingdom was delayed in Nürnberg, where she attended one of the annual Nürnberg rallies. After writing about the rally for a class assignment, she was given Mein Kampf to read by her teacher so she might be able to understand what she saw there. After the Nazi takeover of Austria in 1938, she moved to France, where she worked with orphans during the German occupation until she had to flee the country because of her connection to the French Resistance.

After World War II, she worked for the United Nations Relief and Rehabilitation Administration with refugees in Allied-occupied Germany. Among her tasks was reuniting with their biological families children who had been kidnapped by the Nazis to be raised as "Aryans". This could be a traumatic experience because the children did not always remember their original family, but when she accompanied a train-load of such children back to Poland she saw the delight of the original family members at the restoration of the children.

She attended the Nürnberg trials for four days in 1945 as an observer, and it was here that she first saw Albert Speer, about whom she would later write the book Albert Speer: His Battle with Truth. It was for this book that she was awarded the 1995 James Tait Black Memorial Prize. The book was also later adapted by David Edgar as the play Albert Speer, which was directed by Trevor Nunn at the National Theatre in 2000.

She married Don Honeyman in 1948 and moved to London, where they raised their two children. Don Honeyman (who died 1 June 2011) was a photographer, who worked for Vogue, The Daily Telegraph and The Sunday Times, among other publications. The poster of Che Guevara on a red background (1968) is one of his best known creations.

From the mid-1960s and throughout the 1970s, she wrote extensively for The Daily Telegraph Magazine under the editorship of John Anstey. These articles were often about young people, the social services, children and their relationships with their parents and society. This led to her covering the trial of eleven-year-old Mary Bell (found guilty of murdering two children) and would further lead to her first investigative book on this case.

== Writing ==
=== Books ===
The Case of Mary Bell was first published in 1972 following Mary Bell's trial; in it Sereny interviewed her family, friends and the professionals involved in looking after Mary during her trial. This book was edited by Diana Athill who would also edit Sereny's Into That Darkness.

Into That Darkness (also following an initial article for the Telegraph magazine) was an examination of the guilt of Franz Stangl, the commandant of the Treblinka and Sobibor extermination camps. She spent 70 hours interviewing him in prison for the article and when she had finished he finally admitted his guilt; he died of a heart attack nineteen hours later.

Albert Speer: His Battle with Truth (1995) is a biographical work on Albert Speer, German minister of Armaments during World War II. In it, Sereny explores how much Speer knew about the Holocaust. During the Nuremberg trials, Speer had avoided a death sentence, claiming all the while that he knew nothing of the Holocaust. However, Sereny concludes that Speer must have known based on a letter he wrote to the Jewish community in South Africa (after the war), and the fact that his closest assistant attended the Wannsee Conference (where the details of the genocide of the Jews were worked out) and could not have failed to inform him about the proceedings.

In 1998, her second book on Mary Bell, Cries Unheard, caused controversy in the British press because she shared the publishing fee, from Macmillan Publishers, with Mary Bell for collaborating on the book. Sereny was initially criticised in the British press and by the British government, though the book quickly became, and remains, a standard text for professionals working with problem children.

Sereny wrote of her final book, The German Trauma (2002): "The nineteen chapters in this book, all intimately concerned with Germany before, during and since the end of the Third Reich, describe more or less sequentially what I saw and learned from 1938 to 1999, thus almost over a lifetime."

=== David Irving libel suit ===
British Holocaust denier David Irving initiated a libel case against Sereny and the Guardian Media Group for two reviews in The Observer where she asserted he deliberately falsified the historical record in an attempt to rehabilitate the Nazis. Irving maintained a personal animosity for Sereny, whom he calls "that shriveled Nazi hunter", for successfully refuting his claims since the publication of his book Hitler's War. In 1977, Sereny cross-checked the source he cited for his assertion that Hitler knew nothing about the "Final Solution", and therefore could not have ordered the "Final Solution". Gitta Sereny proved that Irving had made an additional assertion which would have contradicted his claim; "I know many of the same people as he does who were of Hitler's circle ...". Ms. Sereny later said, "That is scary for him. He says, 'we jostle at the same trough'. The difference is that he loves that trough, and I don't. There is, I think, for him [David Irving], despair in all of this." Although the case did not go to court, the cost to the Guardian Media Group of preparing its legal defence amounted to £800,000.

== Death ==
Gitta Sereny died on 14 June 2012 at age 91 while in Addenbrooke's Hospital, Cambridge, after a long illness.

== Bibliography ==
Her writings include:

- The Case of Mary Bell. Vol. 158 of Pimlico (Series). United Kingdom: Random House. 13 February 1995. ISBN 978-0-7126-6297-0.
- Into That Darkness: from Mercy Killing to Mass Murder, a study of Franz Stangl, the commandant of Treblinka (1974, second edition 1995)
- The Invisible Children: Child Prostitution in America, West Germany and Great Britain, London: Deutsch (1984)
- Albert Speer: His Battle with Truth (1995, 1996 paperback)
- Cries Unheard: The Story of Mary Bell (1998)
- The German Trauma: Experiences and Reflections, 1938–2001 (2002)

The second edition of The Case of Mary Bell contains an appendix on the murder of James Bulger.
