= Celia Hammond =

English model and animal rights activist

- Born: 25 July 1943 (age 83)
- Occupations: Model; animal welfare activist

Celia Hammond (born 25 July 1943) is an English former model and animal welfare activist who is well known as a campaigner against fur and for neutering of cats to control the feral population.

== Early life ==
Hammond was born to English parents and grew up in Australia and Indonesia, where her father was a tea taster for Brooke Bond Tea.

As a teenager, Hammond became a vegetarian.

== Modelling career ==
Hammond began her modelling career at the Lucie Clayton Charm Academy in 1960 and was a graduating classmate of Jean Shrimpton. She was also the favourite model of photographer Norman Parkinson and credited the rise of her career to him. She was first under contract with Queen Magazine and then transitioned to modelling Paris collections exclusively with Norman Parkinson for a year. Later she began working for Vogue, forming a close working relationship with photographer Terence Donovan. At first happy to model fur, she later became concerned about the cruelty of the fur trade and took a stand against fur. Singer/Songwriter Donovan wrote "Celia Of The Seals" (released on HMS Donovan (album)) as a tribute to her attitude.

== Celia Hammond Animal Trust ==
In 1986 she founded the Celia Hammond Animal Trust with the aim of opening a low-cost neutering clinic to control the feral animal population. In 1995, the trust opened London's first low-cost neuter clinic in Lewisham. A second clinic opened in Canning Town in 1999. The Celia Hammond Animal Trust also runs a sanctuary in Brede, East Sussex, for animals which need new homes. In addition to neutering animals, the clinics (and sanctuary) also help to rescue and rehome animals, and now find homes for thousands of cats each year.

== Personal life ==
Hammond had a long-term relationship with the guitarist Jeff Beck.
