= Paul E. Burns =

American actor (1881–1967)

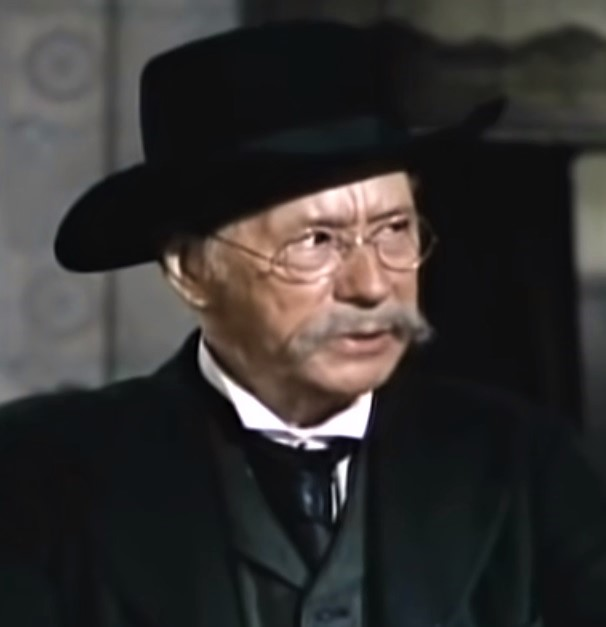
- Born: January 26, 1881
- Died: May 17, 1967 (aged 86)
- Occupation: actor

Paul E. Burns (January 26, 1881 – May 17, 1967) was an American actor, who had a very lengthy career on film and television, although mostly in bit parts.

He played Ebenezer Hawkins in Son of Paleface (1952), Latitude Bucket in The Royal Mounted Rides Again (1945), and Jim the Caretaker in The Mummy's Tomb (1942).

On television, he appeared in multiple episodes of the series Alfred Hitchcock Presents between 1956–1960.

== Partial filmography ==
- Jesse James (1939) – Hank
- Rose of Washington Square (1939) – Chump
- Men of the Timberland (1941) – Lucky
- Saboteur (1942) – Farmer's Wife (uncredited)
- The Mystery of Marie Roget (1942) – Gardener
- The Mummy's Tomb (1942) – Jim
- Young Ideas (1943) – Gardener/Caretaker (uncredited)
- The Royal Mounted Rides Again (1945) – Latitude Bucket
- The Devil's Mask (1946) – Leon Hartman
- The Pilgrim Lady (1947) – Oscar
- Smoky River Serenade (1947) – Pop Robinson
- Unconquered (1947) – Dan McCoy
- Adventures in Silverado (1948) – Sam Perkins
- The Wreck of the Hesperus (1948) – Rudolph Zeiss
- Storm Warning (1950) – Frank Hauser
- The Big Gusher (1951) – Cappy Groves
- Son of Paleface (1952) – Ebenezer Hawkins
- Adventures of Superman
  - (Season 1 Episode 20: "The Riddle of the Chinese Jade") (1953) – Lu Sung
  - (Season 2 Episode 24: "Star of Fate") (1954) – Mr. Whitlock
- Apache (1954) – General Store Proprietor
- Alfred Hitchcock Presents (1956) (Season 1 Episode 36: "Mink") – Furrier Assistant
- Love Me Tender (1956) – Jethro
- Fury at Gunsight Pass (1956) – Squint
- The Proud Ones (1956) – Billy Smith (uncredited)
- Alfred Hitchcock Presents (1959) (Season 5 Episode 8: "The Blessington Method") – Fisherman
- Alfred Hitchcock Presents (1960) (Season 5 Episode 21: "Hitch Hike") – Restaurant Proprietor
- Spartacus (1960) – Fimbria (uncredited)
