= Akon Changkou =

South Sudanese-Australian fashion model

- Born: June 3, 1997 (27 years); South Sudan
- Occupation: Model
- Modeling information
- Height: 5 ft 9 in (1.75 m)
- Hair color: Black
- Eye color: Brown
- Agency: Supreme Management (New York); Women/360 Management (Paris); Premier Model Management (London); Merci Management (Sydney)

Akon Changkou is a South Sudanese-Australian model. Currently ranked as of the Top 50 models by models.com. She has appeared on the cover of British Vogue and Vogue France , and is perhaps best known for working with Louis Vuitton.

== Early life ==
Changkou was born in South Sudan and moved to Australia with her family at age 9, as her uncle had emigrated in the 1990s. She has seven siblings.

== Career ==
Although she was considered to be not tall enough to model by various agencies, once she signed with an agency they sent her to New York where casting director Ashley Brokaw hired her for Louis Vuitton's Paris show. Having never walked on a runway before, she debuted as a Louis Vuitton exclusive in 2020; after walking in five shows for the fashion house, she opened their 2022 show. In fall 2020, she appeared in an ensemble campaign featuring French actresses Léa Seydoux and Stacy Martin, and Korean model Sora Choi among others.

Changkou has walked the runways for Valentino, Nina Ricci, Versace, Simon Porte Jacquemus, Lanvin, Giambattista Valli, Salvatore Ferragamo, Roberto Cavalli, Jason Wu, Dior, Fendi, and Chanel (for which she also has appeared in beauty campaigns, ). She has appeared on the cover of Vogue France, Vogue Hong Kong, Vogue Germany, and Numéro France. Models.com chose her as one of the "Top Newcomers" of the S/S 2021 season. For the October 2021 issue of Vogue, Changkou and American models Sherry Shi and Anok Yai traveled to the Fagradalsfjall volcano in Iceland for an editorial photographed by Annie Leibovitz.

Changkou appeared on an "all black" cover of British Vogue alongside international models of African heritage including Adut Akech, Maty Fall Diba, and Anok Yai.
