= John Doolan =

John Doolan may refer to:

- John Doolan (footballer, born 1968), former Wigan Athletic footballer
- John Doolan (footballer, born 1974), former Mansfield Town and Barnet footballer

== See also ==
- Jack Doolan (disambiguation)
