= Anne Gunning =

British fashion model (1929–1990)

- Anne Gunning, 1953 by Milton Greene
- Born: Anne Gunning Parker; 1929; Southern Rhodesia
- Died: 1990 (aged 60–61)
- Other names: Lady Anne Nutting; Ann Gunning
- Occupation: Fashion model
- Years active: 1950s
- Known for: One of the top models of the 1950s
- Spouse: Sir Anthony Nutting, 3rd Baronet

Anne Gunning (1929 – January 1990) was a British fashion model. Originally a house model for Sybil Connolly, she gained global recognition after being featured on the cover of Life magazine in 1953. She was one of the top models of the 1950s.

== Biography ==
Born Anne Gunning Parker, possibly in Southern Rhodesia where her father, Arnold Barthrop Parker, was a coffee planter. She was of Irish descent, related to the Gunning sisters Elizabeth and Marie, while her father was of Cuckfield, West Sussex, England. Gunning returned to England from Southern Rhodesia following her parents' separation where she was raised by an aunt.

Gunning became the house model of Sybil Connolly, who was introduced to America by Carmel Snow. American photographer Milton H. Greene photographed her during his 1953 trip to Ireland, where he was shooting for Connolly. The 10 August 1953 cover of the Life magazine featured Anne Gunning in Connolly's red Kinsale cape and white crochet evening dress, with the headline "Irish invade fashion world". This cover helped the two women gain international recognition. Gunning went on to work with many notable photographers, including Norman Parkinson, John French and Mark Shaw. She and Barbara Mullen accompanied Parkinson to India, on an assignment for Vogue. She also worked in Paris, New York City and London.

Anne Gunning and Colin Tennant had a prolonged affair. In London, the two modelled for a feature for the French fashion magazine Au Jardin Des Modes (later featured in Paris Match). On 27 May 1961, Anne Gunning married British diplomat and Conservative Party politician Anthony Nutting in Tiverton, Devon.

Anne Gunning limited herself to photographic modelling, despite requests from designers like Coco Chanel to be a part of their stage shows. She did only one fashion show – for Sybil Connolly – as a favour. She was afraid of falling down on the stage, and remarked, "that sea of faces glaring at me was too daunting." She died in January 1990.
