= Ingmari Lamy =

Swedish fashion model (born 1947)

- Born: Ingmari Johanssen; 1947 (age 78–79); Sweden
- Years active: 1968–
- Modelling information
- Height: 5 ft 7.5 in (1.71 m)
- Hair colour: Gray
- Eye colour: Blue

Ingmari Lamy (nee Johanssen, born 5 August 1947) is a Swedish fashion model who became known in the late 1960s. She has been appeared on the covers of Vogue and Harpers Bazaar. She was the face of Yves Saint Laurent perfumes for five years during the 1970s, and a muse to Kenzo.

== Career ==
=== Early career ===
Ingmari was on vacation in Paris when a model scouted her in a night club. The next day she took some test shots with a local photographer. Unbeknownst to her, those photos would wind up on the cover of Harpers Bazaar magazine. From there, Lamy signed with a Parisian agent Models International. Her success led her to model in Italy, England, Germany, United States, and Sweden. In June 1968, she appeared on the cover of Harpers Bazaar. In September 1971, she appeared on the cover of Italian Vogue.

In 1972, Lamy signed with Elite Model Management in Paris She was the face of Yves Saint Laurent fragrance. At the time she only earned 10,000 for an ad that was used for 5 years. Lamy noted that if she had landed that campaign 10 years later she would have yielded a million dollar contract.

During her early career, Lamy worked with Bob Richardson (whose son Terry Richardson she met when he was two years old), Sarah Moon, David Bailey, Giampaolo Barbieri, Barry Lattegan, Bill King, Tiziano Magni, Scavullo, Irving Penn, Hiro, Guy Bourdin, and her now ex-husband, Francois Lamy. She also appeared on the cover of British Vogue, Italian Vogue, British Harpers Bazaar, Queen Magazine, the US edition of Harpers Bazaar, and Linea Italiana.

=== Hiatus and return to fashion ===
Upon her fashion model retirement, Ingmari moved to an island in Formentera in Spain with her family. In 1981, she signed a contract with Kenzo as a designer but by 1991, she moved back to Sweden where she designed her own line called Ingmari Lamy. By 1992, she was rediscovered by photographer Magnus Reed. Her first job after her hiatus was for Intrig Magazine in which she appeared in an editorial called "Sitter Sakert". In 1995, Lamy traveled to the US to shoot for Mirabella Magazine.

Despite being only 5' 7.5" and well beyond her 20s, she has walked for Martin Margiela, Yohji Yamamoto, Jean Paul Gaultier, and Galliano. Since 1991, she has appeared on the covers of Tara Magazine, Red Tee Magazine, and M Magazine in Sweden. She has also worked with notable photographers such as Bob Richardson, David Bailey and Gil Bensimon since her hiatus.

In May 2004, Lamy appeared on Brigitte Magazine's 50th anniversary issue along with Anna Huber. In 2011, Lamy appeared in a campaign for Lanvin for H&M. Lamy is based in Stockholm.

== Personal life ==
In 1977, Lamy married photographer Francois Lamy. She is now divorced. Lamy is a fashion blogger for Rodeo Magazine.
