= Ronald Traeger =

American fashion photographer

Ronald Traeger (1936–1968), was an American fashion photographer, artist and graphic designer.

Traeger did a lot of work with Twiggy, including the famous photos of her riding a bicycle in Battersea Park.

Cecil Beaton stated that Traeger "was well on the way to becoming one of the most brilliant photographers of today".

He was married to fellow photographer Tessa Traeger.

He died of Hodgkin's disease in 1968, aged 31.
