= Regan Cameron =

New Zealand photographer

Regan Cameron (born in Auckland, New Zealand) is a fashion, beauty and celebrity photographer.

== Early life ==
Cameron was inspired by photographers such as Irving Penn, Alex Webb, and Henri Cartier-Bresson, His first photography job was assisting local New Zealand photographers, which then inspired him to pursue a career in fashion and beauty photography.

== Career ==
Cameron moved to London in the early 1990s where his work caught the attention of British Vogue He has enjoyed a collaboration with Vogue ever since, regularly shooting with Teen, Asian, French, Italian and British Vogue. Cameron then moved to New York City in the mid-1990s, where he currently resides. He continues to work for magazines such as Harper's Bazaar UK and Tokyo Numero. His fashion and beauty advertising clients have included GAP, Burberry, DKNY, Olay, Estee Lauder and Max Mara. His celebrity clients have included Madonna, Salma Hayek, Penélope Cruz, Kate Winslet, Nicole Kidman, Cate Blanchett and Gwyneth Paltrow.'
