= Nadine Ijewere =

British fashion and portrait photographer

- Born: c. 1992 (age 33–34); London, England
- Occupation: Photographer
- Known for: Fashion and portrait photography
- Website: www.nadineijewere.co.uk

Nadine Ijewere (born c. 1992) is a London-born photographer of Nigerian-Jamaican parentage. She works in the fields of fashion and portraiture, and is known for celebrating the diversity of her models, many of whom do not conform to the standard fashion industry stereotypes.

== Early life and education ==
Ijewere was born to a Nigerian father and a Jamaican mother and grew up in Peckham, South London.

Ijewere initially studied science and maths at A-level, before deciding to enroll to study photography at the London College of Fashion. During her time there she started to become concerned about some of the unsettling undertones in fashion imagery, particularly the stereotypes used in the portrayal of non-Western cultures. During her final year she started casting mixed-race models who fell outside the industry norm – something that has become central to her work.

== Career ==
After graduating, Ijewere worked for an interior design company, maintaining her photographic passion by spending her weekends, and other spare time, photographing her mixed-raced friends. By posting her early work on social media, she gradually built up her reputation, leading to professional commissions.

Ijewere has worked with a large number of companies with fashion interests, including Dazed, i-D, Stella McCartney, Nike and Gap. In 2017 her work featured at Unseen and at the Lagos Photo Festival. More recently she has worked for Dior, Hermès, Nina Ricci and Valentino.

At age 26, Ijewere became the first woman of colour to shoot a cover for Vogue, anywhere in the world. Her January 2019 cover for the UK edition featured images of Dua Lipa, Binx Walton and Letitia Wright on the English coast. Asked for her thoughts on the Vogue commission, she said, "I feel like in doing this I'm proving to younger girls from a similar background that it's achievable. It also feels like part of a broader shift within our culture to include far more diversity, both behind the camera and in front of it. As a girl, I never identified with anyone in the pages of magazines. Now, we're sending a message that everyone is welcome in fashion."

Ijewere does most of her model casting personally, often choosing models who do not conform to conventional industry standards. She notes, "I especially like to photograph those from ethnicities that are under-represented. London is such a diverse place and I feel that needs to be reflected within the fashion world." She has stated that her work is "all about the celebration of diversity without creating a representation – particularly for women, as we are the ones who are more exposed to beauty ideals and to not being comfortable in who we are".

== Publications ==
- Our Own Selves. Prestel, 2021. ISBN 978-3791387765.
