= Helen Bennett (actress) =

American actress (1911–2001)

- Helen Bennett in Vogue 1938
- Born: August 14, 1911; Springfield, Missouri, U.S.
- Died: February 25, 2001 (aged 89); Santa Monica, California, U.S.
- Education: University of Missouri
- Occupation: Actress
- Years active: 1933-1999
- Spouse: Sylvester James Andrews

Helen Bennett (August 14, 1911 – February 25, 2001) was an American actress. She appeared in numerous films and TV series from the 1930s to the 1990s.

== Early life ==
Bennett was born in Springfield, Missouri, in 1911. She attended the University of Missouri and was named Miss Missouri in 1937. Subsequently, she attended the acting school of the Goodman Theatre in Chicago and had a brief modeling career in New York.

== Career ==
Bennett started her acting career in the late 1930s, appearing in films such as The Middleton Family at the New York World's Fair, The Royal Mounted Rides Again, Because of Him, The Scarlet Horseman, Lost City of the Jungle, Francis in the Haunted House and Step Down to Terror.

She also appeared in TV series like Lux Video Theatre, The Donna Reed Show, No Job for a Lady and The Vice.

Bennett also had her own program, The Sue Bennett Show, which she hosted during 1954.

During the 1960s, Bennett worked as a voice actress for commercials.

== Personal life ==
Bennett was married to Sylvester James Andrews. They had no children.

== Death ==
Bennett died on February 25, 2001, in Santa Monica, California, at the age of 89.

== Filmography ==
=== Film ===
- Moonlight and Pretzels (1933) – Showgirl (uncredited)
- The Middleton Family at the New York World's Fair (1939)
- The Royal Mounted Rides Again (1945, Serial) – Dillie Clark
- Because of Him (1945) – Reporter (uncredited)
- The Scarlet Horseman (1946, Serial) – Mrs. Ruth Halliday
- Blonde Alibi (1946) – Ruth Dixon (uncredited)
- Lost City of the Jungle (1946, Serial) – Indra
- On the Threshold of Space (1956) – Mrs. Lange (uncredited)
- Francis in the Haunted House (1956) – Mrs. Hargrove (uncredited)
- Kelly and Me (1957) – Columnist (uncredited)
- Step Down to Terror (1958) – Mrs. Dunwiddy (uncredited)
- Return to Peyton Place (1961) – Interviewer (uncredited)

=== Television ===
- Lux Video Theatre (1957, Episode: "Payment in Kind") – Helen
- The Donna Reed Show (1959, Episode: "Sleep No More My Lady") – Mrs. Spaulding
- No Job for a Lady (1990, Episode: "A Member of the Committee") – Journalist
- The Vice (1999, 2 episodes) – Jill Melia (final appearance)
