= Don Honeyman =

American photographer

- Born: 29 October 1919; Iowa, United States
- Died: 1 June 2011 (aged 91); London, England
- Occupation: Photographer
- Spouse: Gitta Sereny (m.1948–2011, his death)

Donald Honeyman (29 October 1919 – 1 June 2011) was an American photographer who worked for Vogue, The Daily Telegraph and The Sunday Times, among other publications.

Honeyman was born in Iowa and attended the University of Iowa, graduating in 1940. He then served as an Army combat cameraman during the Second World War. He married Gitta Sereny in 1948 and moved to London where they raised their two children.

One of his creations was a 1968 solarized poster published by Athena (retailer) of Alberto Korda's famous photograph of Che Guevara, Guerrillero Heroico.
