= Debbie Dickinson =

American actress and fashion model

- Born: Debbie Dickinson; December 30; Hollywood, Florida, U.S.
- Relatives: Janice Dickinson (sister)
- Modeling information
- Height: 5 ft 9 in (1.75 m)
- Hair color: Brown
- Eye color: Green
- Website: www.DickinsonGallery.com

Debbie Dickinson (born December 30) is an American former fashion model, actress, PR executive and spokesmodel. She began modeling in 1975 with Elite Model Management in Paris, France represented by John Casablancas.

== Early life ==
Debbie Dickinson was born in Hollywood, Florida, the third daughter of Jennie Marie (née Pietrzykowski) and Ray Dickinson. Her mother was of Polish descent and her father was of British, French, Scottish and Irish ancestry. Her mother inspired her to become a model at a young age.

== Career ==
Dickinson's first fashion show was for Louis Féraud in Paris. She was house model for Chanel, Yves St. Laurent and Karl Lagerfeld for Chloe, Issey Miyake, also the first contract model from the US for Giorgio Armani, also modeled for Gianni Versace, Ralph Lauren, Karl Lagerfeld, and Yves Saint Laurent Opium Campaign and hundreds of editorial plus landed covers of Vogue Paris, British Vogue Mexico Vogue, Cosmopolitan, Amica, Grazia and Mademoiselle. More recently, Dickinson was featured in the documentary Life of a Model. Dickinson moved into the public relations sector and art curation as her modeling career and acting career continues to flourish.

In addition to modeling, Dickinson is also an actress, public relations executive and art curator. She appeared in such films as 5up 2down, Fathers & Sons, I Love N.Y. and Deadly Illusion.
