= Tom Craig (photographer) =

British documentary photographer

- Born: 10 March 1974 (age 52); Cornwall, England
- Education: University of Edinburgh
- Occupation: Documentary photographer
- Website: www.tomcraig.com

Tom Craig is a British documentary photographer.

== Background ==
Craig's work has been featured in publications including Vogue, Vanity Fair, Esquire, and The Sunday Times magazine, in campaigns for Louis Vuitton, Alice Temperley, Mr. Porter, Persol, and in his unique collaboration with A.A. Gill, which has spanned 25 locations across the globe. He also has a regular column in Sunday Times Style entitled 'Snap Shot', which runs weekly.

In 2010, Craig's on-going work with the Nobel Peace Prize-winning organisation Medecins Sans Frontieres culminated in the book Writing on the Edge, which featured his photography paired with essays told from war-torn regions. Highlights include Martin Amis experiencing firsthand the problems of gang violence in Colombia; New York Times best-selling author Tracy Chevalier recounting the abuse of women in Burundi; Oscar-winning actor Daniel Day-Lewis reporting from Palestine; Joanne Harris in Congo-Brazzaville; and Danny Boyle searching for the "lost sea" of Uzbekistan.

Craig has either won or been nominated three times for 'British Magazine Photographer of the Year', exhibited for five consecutive years at the National Portrait Gallery, served as Photographer-in-Residence for the Royal Geographical Society, was named The Telegraph "Travel Photographer of the Year", participated in the prestigious World Press Master Class (which selects 12 photographers from more than 60 countries), and was awarded the Royal Photographic Society's prize for a notable achievement in the art of photography by someone under 35.

In March 2012, Craig's show 'The Bigger Picture' opened on Cork Street in London featuring twenty images from fourteen countries that were also written about at the same moment by A.A. Gill.

In 2013, Craig took part in a joint exhibition with Bay Garnett at the Vogue Festival in London. He also participated on a discussion panel for Vogue on ecological fashion.

Craig lives in London with his partner, stylist Bay Garnett, and their two children.

== Career ==
- The Royal Geographical Society (1998–2000)
- The Independent (2000–2004)
- Regularly contributed to British/American/Japanese and Russian Vogue (2008–2013)
- Regular contributor to The Sunday Times magazine (2011–present)

== Exhibitions ==
=== Solo ===
- 2011 Writing on the Edge Royal Society of Medicine, London.
- 2012 The Bigger Picture Tom Craig and writing by A.A Gill, South Kensington, London.
- 2012 The Bigger Picture Tom Craig and writing by A.A Gill, Cork Street, London.

=== Group ===
- 2003 Nobody's priority: The young of Africa Visa Pour L'image Perpignan Festival of Photography.
- 2008 Childscapes Proud Central, London.
- 2011 Tom Craig and Chaylza Price, Multimedia Art Museum, Baku, Azerbaijan.
- 2013 All Four Corners Tom Craig and Bay Garnett, Vogue Festival, London.

== Publications ==
- Craig, Tom (Photographer) with Dan Crowe (Editor) (2010). Writing on the Edge: Great Contemporary Writers on the Front Line of Crisis. New York: Rizzoli. pp. 276 pages. ISBN 978-0847832910.
