= Georgina Grenville =

South African fashion model (born 1975)

- Born: 1 October 1975 (age 49); Durban, Natal, South Africa
- Children: 3
- Modeling information
- Height: 5 ft 11 in (1.80 m)
- Hair color: Blond
- Eye color: Blue / green
- Agency: Next Model Management (New York, Paris, London, Los Angeles, Miami); FASHION MODEL MANAGEMENT (Milan); MIKAs (Stockholm)

Georgina Grenville (born 1 October 1975 in Durban, Natal, South Africa) is a South African fashion model.

== Career ==
At the age of 14 Grenville won the opening round of the South African 1990 Elite 'Look of the Year' contest. She modeled briefly in Milan, before moving to New York and signing with the Next agency. She was one of the first models of Gucci by Tom Ford (notably starring in the campaign for his famed autumn/winter 1996/97 collection) and also did campaigns for Versace, Christian Dior, Valentino and Armani Exchange. Grenville graced the covers of Vogue, Harper's Bazaar, Elle, L'Officiel, Cosmopolitan and Allure. After closing the Gucci autumn/winter 2004 fashion show, which was Ford's final show for the brand, Vogue declared her "the ultimate high-nineties Gucci model."

== Personal life ==
Grenville is a mother of three kids and lives with her husband.
