= Barry Lategan =

South African photographer (1935–2024)

- Born: 7 January 1935; South Africa
- Died: 11 August 2024 (aged 89); London, England
- Occupations: Photographer; Art Director

Barry Lategan (7 January 1935 – 11 August 2024) was a South African-born fashion, editorial and commercial photographer, best known for his discovery of, and early work with, Twiggy and for British Vogue and Italian Vogue.

== Life and career ==
Lategan was born on 7 January 1935 in South Africa, and came to Britain in 1955 to study at the Bristol Old Vic Theatre School. He was called up for national service with the RAF and it was during this period that he discovered photography. He returned to South Africa in 1959 and assisted the Cape Town photographer Ginger Oads. He returned to London in 1961.

In a comparison with David Bailey, Lategan was described as 'the Gainsborough of fashion photography' to Bailey's Hogarth. Over his career he photographed Princess Anne, Paul McCartney, Linda McCartney, Iman, Germaine Greer, Calvin Klein, Margaret Thatcher, Sol Campbell, John Major, and Salman Rushdie. He was made an Honorary Fellow of the Royal Photographic Society in 2007.

His photography has been exhibited by the Victoria and Albert Museum, The National Portrait Gallery, the Olympus Gallery, the Royal Photographic Society, Bath, and the South African National Gallery.

Lategan suffered a serious fall in 2006 which caused a serious brain injury and increasingly affected his behaviour. In 2016 he was diagnosed with frontotemporal dementia (FTD) while sectioned under the Mental Health Act.

In 2015, Lategan faced a criminal trial for sexual assault after he was accused of groping two women he scouted in 2013 and 2014.

Lategan died in London on 11 August 2024, at the age of 89.
