= Claude Virgin =

British fashion photographer

Claude Ambrose Virgin (8 June 1928 – 1 December 2006) was an American-born British fashion photographer, particularly for British Vogue.

He was born in Atlanta, Georgia;

Virgin's first wife was Margaret Barch; they had one daughter. His second wife was Jillie Bateman; they had two sons named James Virgin and Henry Virgin.
