= Jean Shrimpton =

English model and actress (born 1942)

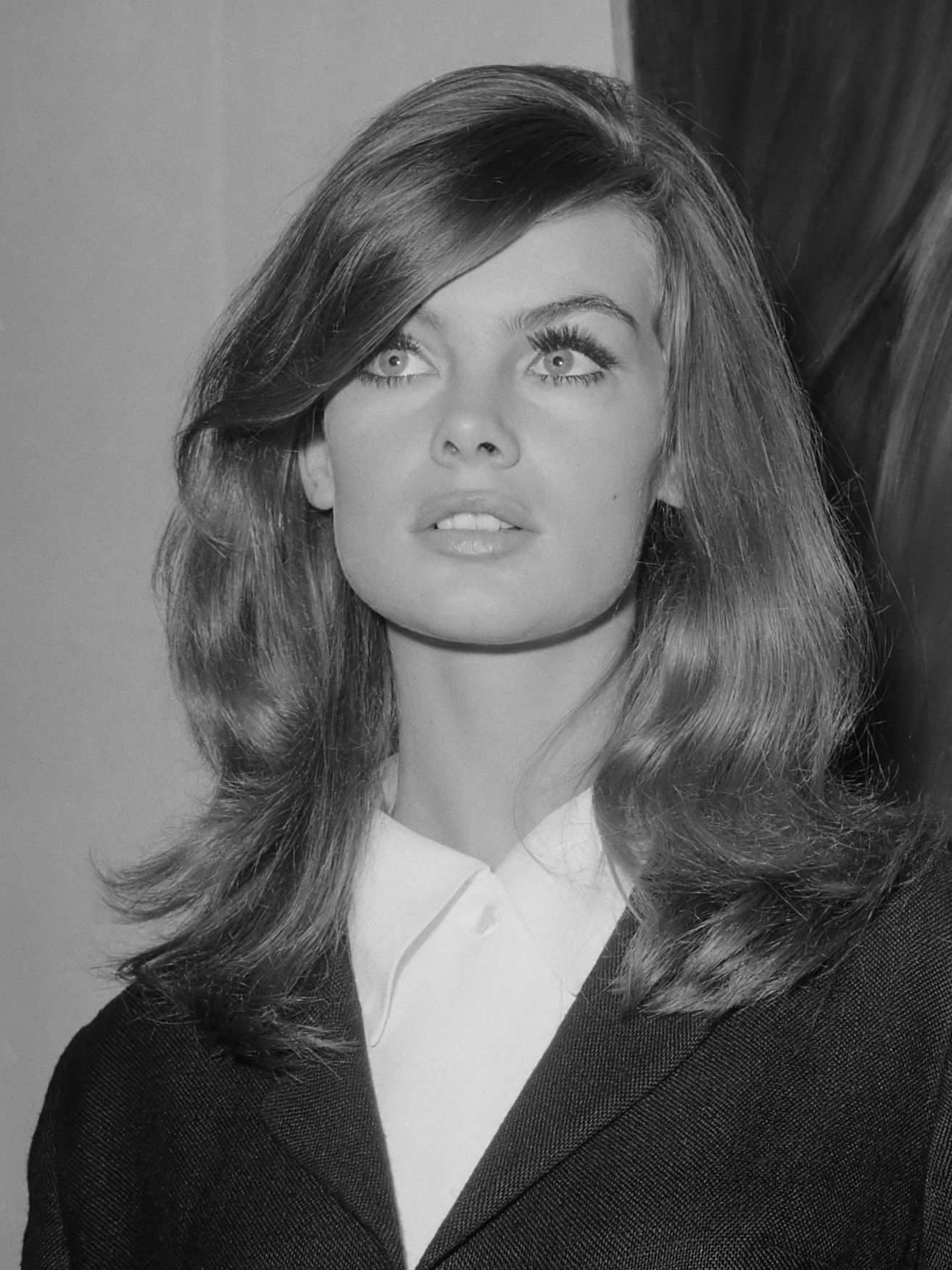
- Shrimpton in 1965
- Born: Jean Rosemary Shrimpton; 7 November 1942 (age 84); High Wycombe, Buckinghamshire, England
- Other names: Jean Cox; The Shrimp; Jeannie Shrimpton
- Occupations: Fashion model; actress; hotelier; innkeeper; antique shop owner; antique dealer
- Spouse: Michael Cox (m. 1979)
- Children: 1
- Relatives: Chrissie Shrimpton (sister)
- Modelling information
- Height: 5 ft 10 in (1.78 m)
- Hair colour: Brown
- Eye colour: Blue

Jean Rosemary Shrimpton (born 7 November 1942) is an English model and actress. She was an icon of Swinging London and is considered one of the world's first supermodels. She appeared on numerous magazine covers including Vogue, Harper's Bazaar, Vanity Fair, Glamour, Elle, Ladies' Home Journal, Newsweek and Time.

In 2009, Harper's Bazaar named Shrimpton one of the 26 best models of all time, and in 2012, Time named her one of the 100 most influential fashion icons since 1923.

== Early life ==
Shrimpton was born in High Wycombe, Buckinghamshire, and educated at St Bernard's Convent School, Slough. She enrolled at Langham Secretarial College in London at age 17. A chance meeting with director Cy Endfield led to an unsuccessful meeting with the producer of his film Mysterious Island (1961). Endfield then suggested she attend the Lucie Clayton Charm Academy's model course. In 1960, aged 17, she began modelling, appearing on the covers of magazines such as Harper's Bazaar, Vanity Fair and Vogue.

== Career ==
Shrimpton rose to prominence through her work with photographer David Bailey. They met in 1960 at a photo shoot that Shrimpton, who was then an unknown model, was working on with photographer Brian Duffy for a Kellogg's corn flakes advertisement. Duffy told Bailey she was too posh for him, but Bailey was undeterred.

Shrimpton's first photo session with Bailey was in 1960 (either for Condé Nast's Brides on 7 December 1960 or for British Vogue). She started to become known in the modelling world around the time she was working with Bailey. Shrimpton has stated she owed Bailey her career, and he is often credited for discovering her and being influential in her career. In turn, she was Bailey's muse, and his photographs of her helped him rise to prominence in his early career.

During her career, Shrimpton was widely reported to be the "world's highest-paid model", the "most famous model" and the "most photographed in the world". She was also described as having the "world's most beautiful face" and as "the most beautiful girl in the world". She was dubbed "The It Girl", "The Face", "The Face of the Moment", and "The Face of the '60s". Glamour named her "Model of The Year" in June 1963. She contrasted with the aristocratic-looking models of the 1950s by representing the coltish, gamine look of the youthquake movement in 1960s Swinging London, and she was reported as "the symbol of Swinging London". Breaking the popular mould of voluptuous figures with her long legs and slim figure, she was nicknamed "The Shrimp". Shrimpton was also known for her long hair with a fringe, wide doe-eyes, long wispy eyelashes, arched brows, and pouty lips.

1965 ABC news report on Jean Shrimpton's visit to the Melbourne Cup

Shrimpton helped launch the miniskirt. In 1965, she made a two-week promotional visit to Australia, sponsored by the Victoria Racing Club and a local synthetic fibre company who had her promote a range of new dresses made of Orlon. She was paid a fee of £2,000, an enormous sum at the time. She caused a sensation in Melbourne when she arrived for the Victoria Derby wearing a white shift dress made by Colin Rolfe which ended 5 in (13 cm) above her knees. She wore no hat, stockings or gloves, and sported a man's watch, unusual at the time. Her hairdresser was Lillian Frank. Shrimpton was unaware she would cause such reaction in the Melbourne community and media.

In her The New York Times article "The Man in the Bill Blass Suit", Nora Ephron wrote that when Shrimpton posed for a Revlon advertisement in an antique white Chantilly lace dress by Blass, minutes after the lipstick placard was displayed at the drugstores, Revlon received calls from women demanding to know where they could buy the dress.

Shrimpton was photographed in 1971 by Clive Arrowsmith, again for British Vogue.

=== Film actress ===
Shrimpton starred alongside pop singer Paul Jones in the 1967 film Privilege.

== Personal life ==
Shrimpton and Bailey began dating soon after they began working together, and subsequently had a four-year relationship that ended in 1964. Bailey was still married to his first wife Rosemary Bramble when the affair began, but left her after nine months and later divorced her to be with Shrimpton. Shrimpton's other romances included actor Terence Stamp and photographer Terry O'Neill.

In 1979, she married photographer Michael Cox at the registry office in Penzance, Cornwall. From 1979, they owned the Abbey Hotel in Penzance; in 2011, the hotel was being managed by her son. The property was listed for sale in late 2023.

== In the media ==
Shrimpton is namechecked (as "Jeannie Shrimpton") in The Smithereens song "Behind the Wall of Sleep" (1986).

The story of Shrimpton's relationship with David Bailey is dramatised in a 2012 BBC Four film We'll Take Manhattan, with Karen Gillan playing the part of Shrimpton.

== Books ==
- Shrimpton, Jean (1964–1965). My Own Story: The Truth About Modelling. Bantam Books. OL 13345124W.
- Shrimpton, Jean; Hall, Unity (1990). Jean Shrimpton: An Autobiography. London: Ebury. ISBN 0852238584.
