= Janaye Furman =

American fashion model from California (born 1995)

- Born: April 23, 1995 (age 31); Pomona, California, U.S.
- Modeling information
- Height: 1.80 m (5 ft 11 in)
- Hair color: Brown
- Eye color: Brown
- Agency: Women Management (New York) (mother agency); Oui Management (Paris); Why Not Model Management (Milan)

Janaye Ronette Furman(born April 23, 1995) is an American fashion model. She is the first black model to open a show for the French fashion house Louis Vuitton.

== Early life ==
Furman was born Los Angeles County city of Pomona, California. As a child, she learned multiple musical instruments and was keen on becoming an entertainer. She took acting courses at the American Musical Dramatic Academy in Los Angeles, where she was scouted to become a model.

== Career ==
Furman debuted at Proenza Schouler during the F/W 2017 fashion week season; later that year she appeared in a Vogue editorial starring Pharrell Williams and many other models including those such as Imaan Hammam, Lineisy Montero, and Alton Mason. She became a Louis Vuitton exclusive for three consecutive seasons, and in the S/S 2018 season, became the first black model to ever open the show for Louis Vuitton.

Off the runway, Furman frequently appeared in advertisements for Vuitton, as well as Hermès and Loewe. In 2019, models.com chose her as one of the "Top Newcomers" for her work with Louis Vuitton and having walked for Burberry and Valentino.

Furman appeared on the April 2021 cover of British Vogue, as one of four individual covers also featuring models Mona Tougaard, Precious Lee, and Achenrin Madit. She also appeared in an equestrian-inspired editorial for WSJ. along with models Sara Grace Wallerstedt and Rebecca Leigh Longendyke.
