= Clive Arrowsmith =

British photographer

- Occupation: Photographer
- Known for: Fashion publications

Clive Arrowsmith is a London-based photographer.

== Works ==
He has worked for many fashion publications and is one of only a few photographers, including Brian Duffy who have twice been given the commission to shoot the Pirelli Calendar. He currently shoots advertising, celebrity, beauty and fashion photography in the UK and internationally. He has also created many album covers including that of Band on the Run for Wings. Before he turned to photography he studied at Kingston School of Art and was considered an outstanding draughtsman.

He has photographed such people as David Bowie and the Dalai Lama.

One of photographer Willie Christie's first jobs was as an assistant to Arrowsmith.

== Music videos ==
Directed music videos include:

- Def Leppard - 'Long, Long Way to Go'
- A remake of Two Tribes go to War
