= Adut Akech =

South Sudanese-Australian model (born 1999)

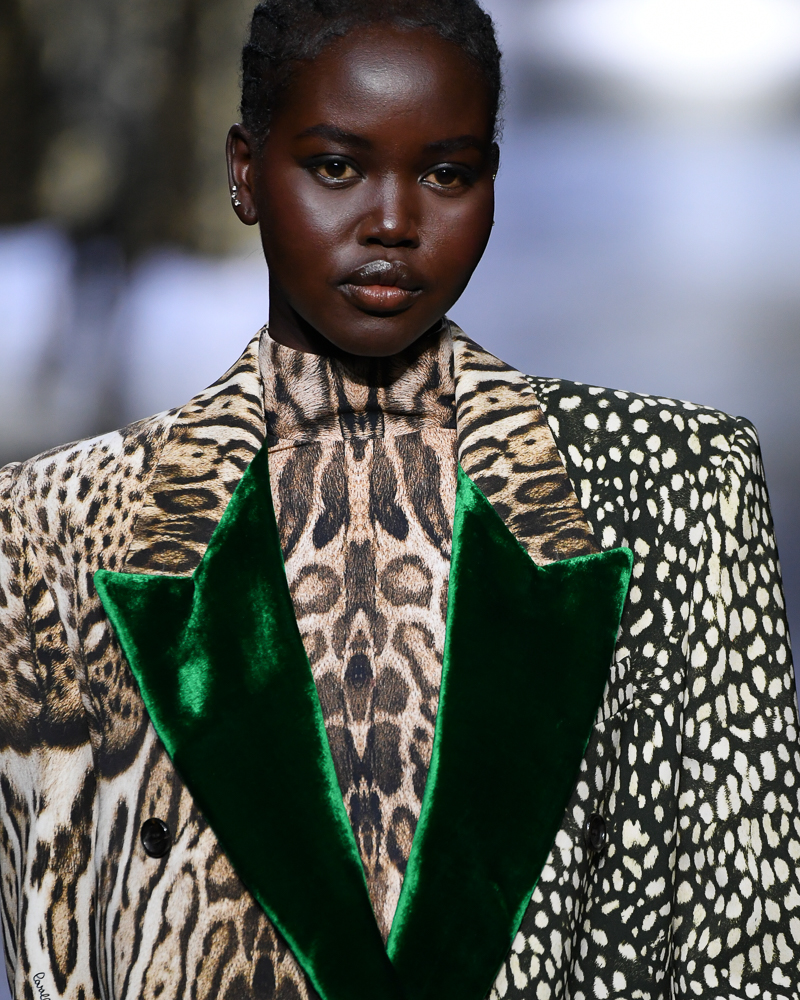
- Akech modelling for Roberto Cavalli in 2022
- Born: Adut Akech Bior; 25 December 1999 (age 26); South Sudan
- Occupation: Model
- Years active: 2016–present
- Partner: Samuel Elkhier
- Children: 2
- Modelling information
- Height: 5 ft 10 in (1.78 m)
- Hair colour: Black
- Eye colour: Brown
- Agency: The Society Management (New York); Elite Model Management (Paris, Milan, London, Barcelona, Copenhagen); Chadwick Models (Sydney)

Adut Akech Bior (/əˈdʊt əˈkɛtʃ/ ə-DUUT ə-KETCH; born 25 December 1999) is a South Sudanese-Australian model. Akech made her fashion week runway debut as an exclusive in the Saint Laurent S/S 17 show and went on to close both their F/W 17 and S/S 18 shows as an exclusive. In 2018, she was chosen as "Model of the Year" by models.com, an honour which was repeated the next year. Models.com includes Akech in its list of the "New Supers".

== Early life ==
Adut Akech was born in Sudan (in an area that later became part of South Sudan), but was raised in Kakuma, Kenya. Akech was born on Christmas Day, on the way to Kenya. She was 7 years old when she moved from Kenya along with her mother to Adelaide, Australia as South Sudanese refugees seeking asylum. They also had relatives there. Akech has five siblings. Akech was known as "Mary", her Christian second name in Adelaide, as Australian teachers found it difficult to pronounce her name.

== Career ==
=== Early work, 2016–2019 ===
Akech was introduced to the fashion industry by her family, and despite getting scouted multiple times by local modelling agencies when she was 13 and 14 years old, she started her modelling career at 16 years old, signing to her mother agency, Chadwick Models, in Sydney, Australia. Within the fashion industry, she prefers her birth name, Adut.

Akech's runway debut was in a local fashion show, put together by her aunt. She then went on to walk in Melbourne Fashion Week, where she took digitals for a Saint Laurent casting in Paris Fashion Week. After Melbourne Fashion Week, back home in Adelaide, she got a call from her agent confirming her for the Saint Laurent show, and took a flight to Paris a day after, making her major Fashion Week debut at Saint Laurent's S/S 17 show and signing to Elite Model Management in Paris. Since then, Akech has done 4 campaigns and closed 2 shows for Saint Laurent, 1 campaign and 2 shows for Valentino, one campaign for Zara, and one campaign for Moschino, as well as walked for Alexander McQueen, Givenchy, Kenzo, Prada, Lanvin, Loewe, Miu Miu, Acne Studios, Tom Ford, Tory Burch, Jason Wu, Bottega Veneta, Anna Sui, Calvin Klein, JW Anderson, Simone Rocha, Burberry, Off-White, Ellery, Jil Sander, Giambattista Valli, Proenza Schouler and Versace.

She has shot editorials for American Vogue, British Vogue, Vogue Italia, Vogue Paris, I-D Magazine, Le Monde M Magazine, Modern Matter, Numéro, The Gentlewoman, WSJ., T Magazine and Vogue Australia. Akech has landed magazine covers for I-D Magazine, 10 Magazine Australia, Vogue Italia, British Vogue, Vogue Australia, Portrait, Elle Croatia, L'Officiel Singapore and Le Monde M Magazine. She is one of the people featured in the 2018 Pirelli Calendar, shot by Tim Walker, alongside Sasha Lane, Lil Yachty, Sean Combs, Whoopi Goldberg, RuPaul, Adwoa Aboah, Naomi Campbell and Slick Woods. She was Melbourne Spring Fashion Week's ambassador for 2019.

In 2019, Who magazine ran a feature about Akech but printed a picture of another model instead of her. Akech said that the error was "unacceptable and inexcusable" and felt that the "entire race has been disrespected." Who apologised to her for the error. In this year, Akech also started working with the United Nations Refugee Agency to help refugees. In her words, "Refugees are just like everyone else", and she would want to be a positive role model for people that are in similar situations to her upbringing.

In 2023, Akech started working with the United Nations High Commissioner for refugees, promoting causes to support refugees worldwide.

=== Rise to prominence, 2020–present ===
In 2020, Adut Akech was featured beside Naomi Campbell in Beyonce's "Black Is King" for the song "Brown Skin Girl". Akech also appeared on the cover of the American Vogue in the same year.

In 2022, Akech worked several fall fashion campaigns including Michael Kors and Victoria's Secret. Akech was also part of the Hugo Boss and H&M holiday campaign. She also appeared on the cover of the British Vogue and Vogue Italia.

Akech was also one of 17 cover models featured on the September issue of The W Magazine as a part of their 50th Anniversary Issue. In 2023 Akech was part of the Victoria's Secret campaign along with Naomi Campbell. Akech also appeared on the American Vogue for the May Issue alongside Natalia Vodianova, Devon Aoki, Naomi Campbell, Anok Yai, Gigi Hadid, Liu Wen, Amber Valletta, Shalom Harlow celebrating Karl Lagerfeld's legacy.

In 2024, she was part of the Valentino perfume advertising campaign. Akech appeared on the cover of British Vogue for the March issue alongside Gigi Hadid, Kaia Gerber, Cindy Crawford, Iman, Kate Moss, Linda Evangelista, Cara Delevingne, Irina Shayk, Karlie Kloss, Vittoria Ceretti which celebrated 40 icons in the fashion industry.

== Personal life ==
Akech is married to Samuel Elkhier. In July 2024, Akech confirmed she was pregnant with their first child via a Vogue photoshoot posted to her Instagram page. She gave birth to their daughter, Kiki, later in 2024.

== Honours ==
She was one of fifteen women selected to appear on the cover of the September 2019 issue of British Vogue, by guest editor Meghan, Duchess of Sussex.

On 2 December 2019, she won the 'Model of the Year' award at the British Fashion Awards in London.
