= Maty Fall Diba =

Senegalese fashion model

Dibbamaty
- Born: 1 May 2001 (age 24); Dakar, Senegal
- Modeling information
- Height: 1.78 m (5 ft 10 in)
- Agency: IMG Models (New York, New York,)

Maty Fall Diba (born May 1, 2001), also known as Maty Fall, is a Senegalese fashion model. She is currently ranked as one of the Top 50 models by models.com.

== Early life ==
Fall Diba was born in Senegal, where she lived in Ouest Foire, just north of Dakar. At age 9, she moved to Italy, where her father had been living for three decades. She was raised in Chiampo, and by 18, she became an Italian citizen.

== Career ==
Fall Diba was quickly signed to IMG Models after submitting photos through their scouting portal. She debuted as a semi-exclusive for Saint Laurent's Spring/Summer 2020 runway show, going on to close Valentino and walk for both Sacai & Lanvin that same season. Fall Diba has since opened Missoni's Fall/Winter 2020 show, closed Philosophy's Spring/Summer 2021 show and opened their Fall/Winter 2021 show, closed Dior's Resort 2021 show, closed Blumarine's Spring/Summer 2021 show, closed Valentino's Fall/Winter 2021 show, and closed Max Mara's Resort 2022 show. In February 2020, she did her first cover for Vogue Italia's February 2020 issue, dedicated to celebrating Italian beauty, having graced their cover a second time in May 2021. Fall Diba's first Vogue Italia cover marked controversy due to her Senegalese roots, with League councilor Daniele Beschin proclaiming her not to be an "Italian beauty". Beschin has since been fired due to his remarks against Fall Diba. She has also covered both Vogue Netherlands' and i-D Magazine's March 2021 issues, respectively. Fall Diba covered Vogue Italia's June and December 2021 issues, and was one of nine models of African descent featured on British Vogue's February 2022 issue.

Fall Diba is currently ranked as one of the Top 50 Models on Models.com. She walked more shows during the Spring/Summer 2021 fashion show season than any other model, most notably closing Dior.

== Personal life ==
Fall Diba studied English, Spanish, and French in school.
