= Bob Richardson (photographer) =

American photographer (1928–2005)

- Born: Robert George Richardson; January 3, 1928; Brooklyn, New York, U.S.
- Died: December 5, 2005 (aged 77); New York City, New York, U.S.
- Occupation: Fashion photographer
- Children: 2, including Terry Richardson

Robert George Richardson (January 3, 1928 – December 5, 2005) was an American fashion photographer.

Richardson was born in Brooklyn to an Irish Catholic family. Originally a graphic designer in New York City, Richardson did not pick up a camera until age 35. His rise to fashion fame was swift, although not without some battle on his part:

I wanted to put reality in my photographs. Sex, drugs and rock 'n' roll. That's what was happening. And I was going to help make it happen. Boy they did not want that in America. Some of those editors were still wearing white gloves to couture.

Richardson developed a reputation for being very difficult to work with. He brought his personal life, which was tumultuous, into his art. He battled with bouts of schizophrenia throughout his life. After making it to the top of the often catty and vicious world of fashion, getting paid up to $15,000 for a single image, he succumbed to his illness and ended up homeless on the streets of San Francisco. In 1989, an art historian researching fashion photography tracked Richardson down living in a flophouse, opening the door to Richardson's reestablishing contact with his son and eventually returning to New York City, where with the help of Richard Avedon and Steven Meisel, he was able to obtain teaching positions at International Center for Photography and the School of Visual Arts. Richardson restarted his career in his sixties, once again working for such magazines as Italian Vogue and British GQ.

== Subjects ==
Donna Mitchell, a Ford model, later an actress, was a notable subject for his fashion editorial photography.

== Personal life ==
He was the father of photographer Terry Richardson and a daughter. He was bisexual. For four years he lived with actress Anjelica Huston, beginning when he was 41 and she was 17.
