= Norman Parkinson =

English portrait and fashion photographer

Norman Parkinson CBE
- Born: Ronald William Parkinson Smith; 21 April 1913; London, England
- Died: 15 February 1990 (aged 76); Singapore
- Style: Portrait and fashion photographer
- Spouses: Margaret (Peggy) Mitchell-Banks (m. 1935) Thelma Woolley née Blay (m. 1942) Wenda Rogerson (m. 1951)
- Awards: CBE

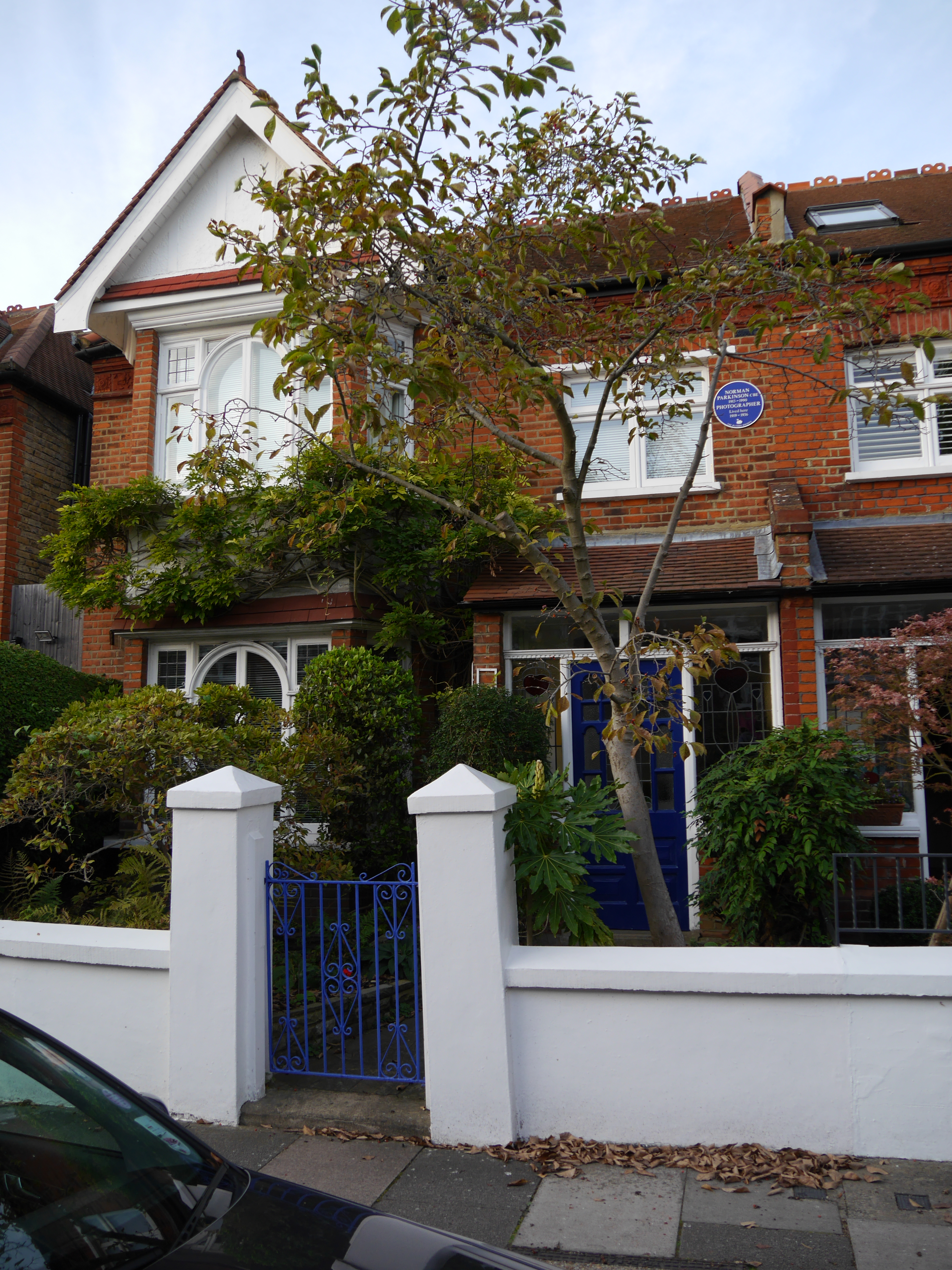
32 Landford Road, Putney

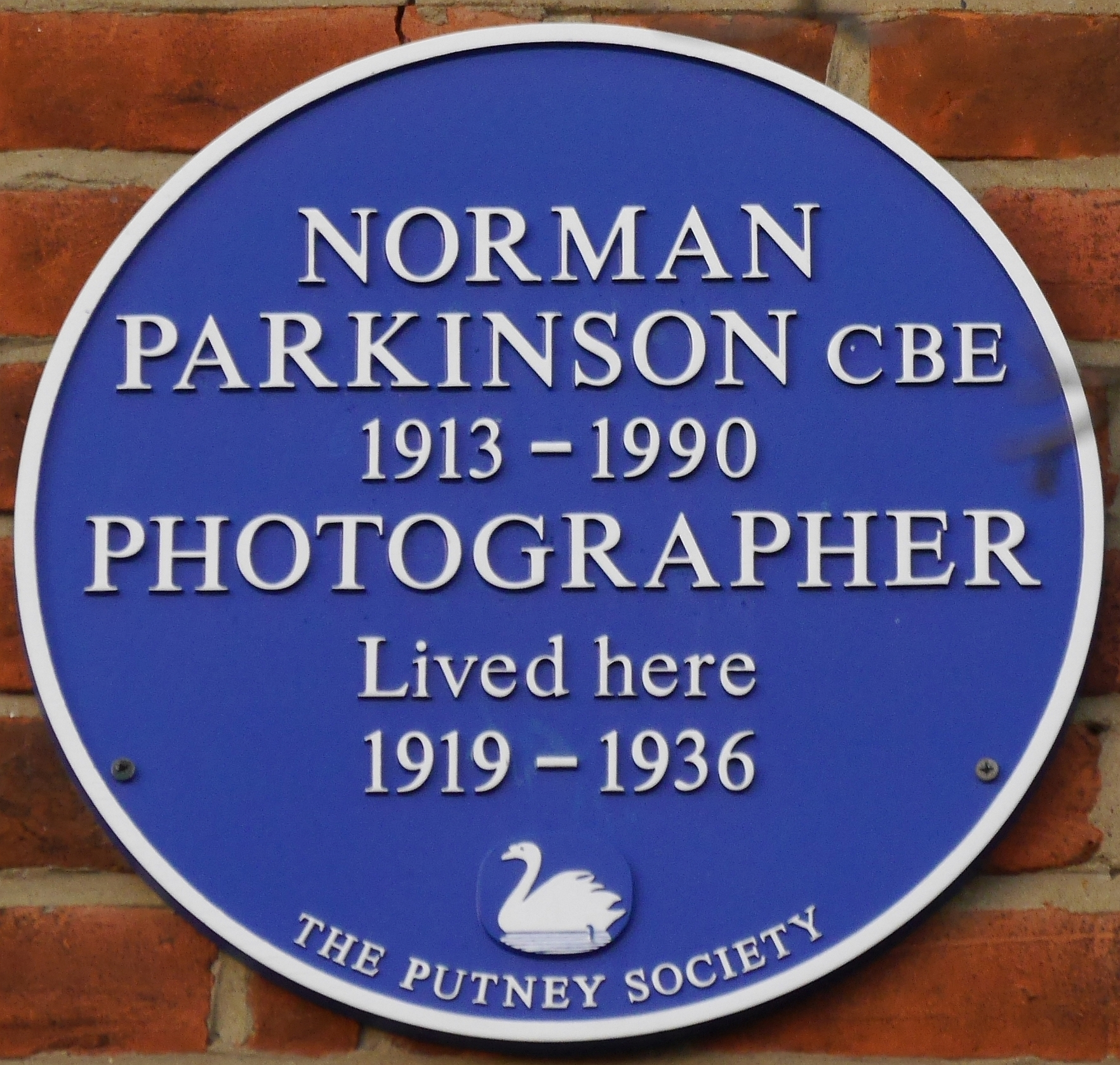
Blue plaque, 32 Landford Road

Norman Parkinson CBE (21 April 1913 – 15 February 1990) was an English portrait and fashion photographer. His work revolutionised British fashion photography, as he moved his subjects out of the studio and used outdoor settings. While serving as a Royal Air Force photographer in World War II, he started with Vogue magazine, discovering several famous models. He became an official royal photographer in 1969, taking photographs for Princess Anne's 19th birthday and the Investiture portrait of Charles III as Prince of Wales. Many other royal portraits included official portraits of Queen Elizabeth The Queen Mother for her 75th birthday. He was known for using elements of humour in his photographs. Parkinson received many honours during his life including the Royal Photographic Society's Progress Medal, the Lifetime Achievement Award of the American Society of Magazine Photographers, a Google Doodle, and a British postage stamp.

== Biography ==
Parkinson (birth name Ronald William Parkinson Smith) was born in London, and educated at Westminster School. He began his career in 1931 as an apprentice to the court photographers, Speaight and Sons Ltd. In 1934, he opened his own studio together with Norman Kibblewhite, at 1 Dover Street off London's Piccadilly. From 1935 to 1940 he worked for Harper's Bazaar and Bystander magazines. In 1941 after leaving Harper's Bazaar he started a long collaboration with Vogue, at first working only occasionally covering the home front, combining that with farming at first in Worcestershire. Some biographies record that during the Second World War he also served as a reconnaissance photographer over France for the Royal Air Force. From 1941 to 1960 he was employed as a portrait and fashion photographer for Vogue. From 1960 to 1964 he was an Associate Contributing Editor of Queen magazine. In 1963 he moved to Tobago, although he frequently returned to London, and from 1964 until his death he worked as a freelance photographer. He was made a Commander of the Order of the British Empire in the 1981 New Year Honours. He was the subject of This Is Your Life in 1978 when he was surprised by Eamonn Andrews at Hamiltons Gallery in London's Mayfair.

In 1990, Parkinson collapsed with a brain hemorrhage while on a shooting assignment in Sabah, Malaysia for Town and Country Magazine. Accompanied by his friend Mohamed Al-Fayed, he was then flown to Singapore for further treatment, but died there later on.

== Photography ==
Parkinson always maintained he was a craftsman and not an artist. From his early days as a photographer up to his death he remained one of the foremost British portrait and fashion photographers. His work, following the lead of Martin Munkacsi at Harper's Bazaar, revolutionized the world of British fashion photography in the mid-1930s by bringing his models from the rigid studio environment into a far more dynamic outdoor setting. Humour played a central role in many of his photographs which often included himself. As well as magazine work he was also invited to create the 1985 edition of the Pirelli calendar, working with top fashion models such as Iman. His years as an official royal photographer began in 1969 when he took photographs for Princess Anne's 19th birthday and a photograph of Prince Charles's investiture as Prince of Wales. Official engagement photographs for Princess Anne followed by her wedding in 1973 consolidated his position. His other notable royal portraits included official portraits of Queen Elizabeth The Queen Mother for her 75th birthday in 1975. Five years later he photographed her with her two daughters, Princess Margaret and Queen Elizabeth.

== Honours ==
In 1981, he was awarded the Royal Photographic Society's Progress Medal, which "carries with it an Honorary Fellowship of the Society" and later the Lifetime Achievement Award of the American Society of Magazine Photographers. In the same year a major retrospective exhibition was staged at London's National Portrait Gallery. He received a Google Doodle on 21 April 2013, as well as a British postage stamp to mark the centenary of his birth. The stamp was based on a photograph of Parkinson taken by Roger George Clark and a 1949 fashion photograph.

== Discoveries ==
- He discovered model Celia Hammond for Queen magazine in 1959.
- He spotted Nena von Schlebrügge (the mother of Uma Thurman) at age 14 when she was still at senior school in Stockholm, and brought her to London to model in 1957 for Vogue magazine. In 1960 he also photographed Von Schlebrügge for Jaeger in New York for Queen.
- His photo of Jerry Hall sparked Bryan Ferry's interest to invite her over to star as the cover model for Roxy Music's fifth studio album, Siren.

== Sausages ==
Parkinson founded the now defunct sausage company Porkinson Bangers. After missing sausages whilst living on Tobago, he created his own recipe and marketed them in British supermarkets.

== Family ==
He was first married in 1935, in Hampstead to Margaret (Peggy) Mitchell-Banks (1913-1950) who was an artist and illustrator who later married the writer Peter de Polnay. After the end of his first marriage in the late 1930s he began working with another fashion model, Thelma Woolley (née Blay) whom he married in 1942. He later met the actress, author, and model Wenda Rogerson, who became his third wife.

== Publications ==
- Sisters under the skin (1978), St. Martin's Press, ISBN 0-312-72746-1
- Photographs by Norman Parkinson : Fifty Years of Portraits and Fashion by Terence Pepper (1981), National Portrait Gallery, ISBN 0904017419
- Norman Parkinson: Lifework (1984), The Vendome Press, ISBN 0-86565-031-4)
- Would you let your daughter? (1987), Weidenfeld and Nicolson, ISBN 0-297-78683-0)
- Norman Parkinson (1987), Hamilton Galleries, ASIN: B0007BRZFA)
- Parkinson : Photographs 1935–1990 by Martin Harrison, (1994), Conrad Octopus ISBN 1-85029-533-6
- Norman Parkinson: Portraits in Fashion by Robin Muir (2004), Trafalgar Square Publishing, ISBN 1-57076-277-5)
- Norman Parkinson: A Very British Glamour by Louise Baring (2009), Rizzoli ISBN 978-0-8478-3342-9 – a tie-in with the exhibition of the same name at Somerset House, 9 October 2009 – 31 January 2010
- Norman Parkinson with The Beatles, edited and designed by Alex Smee, introduction by Pat Gilbert (2016), Rufus Stone Limited Editions ISBN 0993287913
- The Beatles: London 1963, Norman Parkinson, introduction by Pat Gilbert, revised and expanded edition (2018), ACC Art Books ISBN 978-1851499144
- Norman Parkinson: Always in Fashion, (2019), ACC Art Books, ISBN 978-1788840262

== Notes and references ==
Notes

References

- "Progress Medal". Royal Photographic Society. 1981. Archived from the original on 22 August 2012.
- "New Year Honours". The Times. No. 60814. London: NI Group. 31 December 1980. p. 6.
- "Obituaries: Norman Parkinson". The Times. No. 63631. London: NI Group. 16 February 1990. p. 14.
- McFadden, Robert D. (17 February 1990). "Norman Parkinson, photographer, Adventurer and Royal Gadfly". The New York Times. New York.
- Baring, Louise (10 October 2009). "Norman Parkinson: Never out of fashion". The Daily Telegraph. London.
- "Norman Parkinson: legend behind a lens". Financial Times. London: Pearson PLC. 29 March 2013.
- "About Porkinson". Archived from the original on 1 May 2012.
