= Jack Dolan =

Australian rules footballer, born 1906

Personal information
- Full name: Jack Dolan
- Born: 14 June 1906; Essendon, Victoria
- Died: 5 March 2001 (aged 94)
- Original teams: St Thomas Church of England, Essendon
- Height: 180 cm (5 ft 11 in)
- Weight: 73 kg (161 lb)

Playing career^{1}
Years	Club	Games (Goals)
1926–29	Essendon	24 (0)
1929–31	Oakleigh (VFA)	51 (6)
- ^{1} Playing statistics correct to the end of 1931.

Jack Dolan (14 June 1906 – 5 March 2001) was an Australian rules footballer who played with Essendon in the Victorian Football League (VFL).
