= List of Harper's Bazaar US cover models =

This list of Harper's Bazaar cover models (1929–present) is a catalog of cover models who have appeared on the cover of the American fashion magazine Harper's Bazaar. From 1967 to 1929 the magazine was published as Harper's Bazar.

== 1920s ==
=== 1929 ===
Issue	Cover model	Illustrator
January	—N/a	Léon Benigni
February	—N/a	Reynaldo Luza
March	—N/a	Reynaldo Luza
April	—N/a	Erté
May	—N/a	Erté
June		
July	—N/a	Erté
August	—N/a	Léon Benigni
September	—N/a	Léon Benigni
October	—N/a	Léon Benigni
November	—N/a	Léon Benigni
December	—N/a	Erté

== 1930s ==
=== 1930 ===
Issue	Cover model	Illustrator
January	—N/a	Léon Benigni
February	—N/a	Erté
March	—N/a	Erté
April	—N/a	Erté
May	—N/a	Léon Benigni
June	—N/a	Erté
July	—N/a	Léon Benigni
August	—N/a	Erté
September	—N/a	Léon Benigni
October	—N/a	Reynaldo Luza
November	—N/a	Léon Benigni
December	—N/a	Erté

=== 1931 ===
Issue	Cover model	Illustrator
January	—N/a	Erté
February	—N/a	Erté
March	—N/a	Léon Benigni
April	—N/a	Erté
May	—N/a	Léon Benigni
June	—N/a	Erté
July	—N/a	Léon Benigni
August	—N/a	Erté
September	—N/a	Léon Benigni
October	—N/a	Erté
November	—N/a	Léon Benigni
December	—N/a	Erté

=== 1932 ===
Issue	Cover model	Illustrator
January	—N/a	Léon Benigni
February	—N/a	Léon Benigni
March	—N/a	Léon Benigni
April	—N/a	Léon Benigni
May	—N/a	Léon Benigni
June	—N/a	Léon Benigni
July	—N/a	Léon Benigni
August	—N/a	Léon Benigni
September	—N/a	Léon Benigni
October	—N/a	Léon Benigni
November		Léon Benigni
December	—N/a	Erté

=== 1933 ===
Issue	Cover model	Illustrator
January	—N/a	Erté
February	—N/a	Erté
March	—N/a	Erté
April	—N/a	Erté
May	—N/a	Erté
June	—N/a	Erté
July	—N/a	Erté
August	—N/a	Erté
September	—N/a	Erté
October	—N/a	Erté
November	—N/a	Erté
December	—N/a	Erté

=== 1934 ===
Issue	Cover model	Illustrator
January	—N/a	Erté
February	—N/a	Erté
March	—N/a	Erté
April	—N/a	Erté
May	—N/a	Erté
June	—N/a	Erté
July	—N/a	Erté
August	—N/a	Erté
September	—N/a	Erté
October	—N/a	Erté
November	—N/a	Erté
December	—N/a	Erté

=== 1935 ===
Issue	Cover model	Illustrator
January	—N/a	Erté
February	—N/a	Erté
March		Erté
April	—N/a	Erté
May	—N/a	Erté
June	—N/a	Erté
July	—N/a	Erté
August	—N/a	A. M. Cassandre
September	—N/a	Erté
October	—N/a	Erté
November	—N/a	Alexey Brodovitch
December	—N/a	Leslie Gill

=== 1936 ===
Issue	Cover model	Illustrator
January	—N/a	Alexey Brodovitch
February	—N/a	Alexey Brodovitch
March	—N/a	Erté
April	—N/a	Erté
May	—N/a	Erté
June	—N/a	Erté
July	—N/a	Erté
August	—N/a	A. M. Cassandre
September	—N/a	Erté
October	—N/a	Erté
November	—N/a	Erté
December	—N/a	A. M. Cassandre

=== 1937 ===
Issue	Cover model	Illustrator/Photographer
January		Man Ray, Irwin-Langen
February	—N/a	A. M. Cassandre
March	—N/a	A. M. Cassandre
March 15		A. M. Cassandre
April	—N/a	A. M. Cassandre
May	—N/a	A. M. Cassandre
June	—N/a	A. M. Cassandre
July	—N/a	A. M. Cassandre
August	—N/a	A. M. Cassandre
September		A. M. Cassandre
September 15	—N/a	A. M. Cassandre
October	—N/a	A. M. Cassandre
November	—N/a	A. M. Cassandre
December	—N/a	A. M. Cassandre

=== 1938 ===
Issue	Cover model	Illustrator
January	—N/a	A. M. Cassandre
February	—N/a	A. M. Cassandre
March 1	—N/a	A. M. Cassandre
March 15	—N/a	A. M. Cassandre
April	—N/a	A. M. Cassandre
May	—N/a	A. M. Cassandre
June	—N/a	A. M. Cassandre
July	—N/a	A. M. Cassandre
August	—N/a	A. M. Cassandre
September 1	—N/a	A. M. Cassandre
September 15	—N/a	A. M. Cassandre
October	—N/a	A. M. Cassandre
November	—N/a	A. M. Cassandre
December	—N/a	A. M. Cassandre

=== 1939 ===
Issue	Cover model	Illustrator/Photographer
January	—N/a	A. M. Cassandre
February	—N/a	Alexey Brodovitch
March 1	—N/a	A. M. Cassandre
March 15	—N/a	A. M. Cassandre
April	—N/a	A. M. Cassandre
May	—N/a	A. M. Cassandre
June	—N/a	A. M. Cassandre
July	—N/a	A. M. Cassandre
August	—N/a	A. M. Cassandre
September 1	—N/a	Alexey Brodovitch, Leslie Gill, Irving Penn
September 15	—N/a	A. M. Cassandre
October	—N/a	A. M. Cassandre
November	—N/a	A. M. Cassandre
December	—N/a	A. M. Cassandre

== 1940s ==
=== 1940 ===
Issue	Cover model	Illustrator/Photographer
January	—N/a	Marcel Vertès
February	—N/a	Alexey Brodovitch
March 1	—N/a	Pavel Tchelitchew
March 15	—N/a	A. M. Cassandre
April	—N/a	A. M. Cassandre
May	—N/a	A. M. Cassandre
June	Laurie Douglas	Herbert Matter
July	—N/a	Marcel Vertès
August		Herbert Bayer
September 1	—N/a	Marcel Vertès
September 15	Liz Gibbons	Louise Dahl-Wolfe
October	—N/a	Marcel Vertès
November	—N/a	Marcel Vertès
December	—N/a	Marcel Vertès

=== 1941 ===
Issue	Cover model	Illustrator/Photographer
January	Betty Ribble	Martin Munkacsi
February	—N/a	Marcel Vertès
March 1	—N/a	Marcel Vertès
March 15	—N/a	Marcel Vertès
April	—N/a	Marcel Vertès
May	—N/a	Marcel Vertès
June	Andrea Johnson	Louise Dahl-Wolfe
July		Louise Dahl-Wolfe
August	Bettina Bolegard	Louise Dahl-Wolfe
September 1	—N/a	Marcel Vertès
September 15	Rita Toohey	Louise Dahl-Wolfe
October		George Hoyningen-Huene
November	Toni Hollingsworth	George Hoyningen-Huene
December		Erwin Blumenfeld

=== 1942 ===
Issue	Cover model	Photographer/Illustrator
January	Bijou Barrlington	Louise Dahl-Wolfe
February	Bijou Barrlington	Erwin Blumenfeld
March 1	—N/a	Marcel Vertès
March 15	Betty Bond	Louise Dahl-Wolfe
April	—N/a	Marcel Vertès
May	Betty Bond	Louise Dahl-Wolfe
June	—N/a	Marcel Vertès
July	—N/a	Staples Smith
August		Louise Dahl-Wolfe
September	—N/a	Marcel Vertès
October	Betty Bond	Louise Dahl-Wolfe
November		Erwin Blumenfeld
December		Erwin Blumenfeld

=== 1943 ===
Issue	Cover model	Photographer/Illustrator
January		George Hoyningen-Huene
February	Betty Bond	Louise Dahl-Wolfe
March	Lauren Bacall	Louise Dahl-Wolfe
April	Blanche Grady	George Hoyningen-Huene
May		George Hoyningen-Huene
June	Bettina Bolegard	Erwin Blumenfeld
July		Erwin Blumenfeld
August		Louise Dahl-Wolfe
September	Liz Gibbons	Louise Dahl-Wolfe
October	Lisa Fonssagrives	Louise Dahl-Wolfe
November		Louise Dahl-Wolfe
December	—N/a	Marcel Vertès

=== 1944 ===
Issue	Cover model	Photographer/Illustrator
January		Louise Dahl-Wolfe
February		Louise Dahl-Wolfe
March	—N/a	Marcel Vertès
April	—N/a	Marcel Vertès
May		Louise Dahl-Wolfe
June	Betty Bond	Louise Dahl-Wolfe
July	—N/a	Gene Fenn
August	Betty Anderson	Louise Dahl-Wolfe
September	Dorian Leigh	Louise Dahl-Wolfe
October		Rouben Samberg
November	Lisa Fonssagrives	Louise Dahl-Wolfe
December	—N/a	Marcel Vertès

=== 1945 ===
Issue	Cover model	Photographer/Illustrator
January	Florence Dornin	Louise Dahl-Wolfe
February	—N/a	Edward McKnight Kauffer
March	Lisa Fonssagrives	Louise Dahl-Wolfe
April		Louise Dahl-Wolfe
May	Elise Daniels	Louise Dahl-Wolfe
June		Bassman Paul
July	Toni Hollingsworth	Louise Dahl-Wolfe
August	Sabrina Weber	Louise Dahl-Wolfe
September	—N/a	Alexey Brodovitch
October	—N/a	Sara Johns
November	Kitty Kopet	George Hoyningen-Huene
December	Lisa Fonssagrives	Louise Dahl-Wolfe

=== 1946 ===
Issue	Cover model	Photographer/Illustrator
January		Louise Dahl-Wolfe
February	—N/a	Sara Johns
March	—N/a	Alexey Brodovitch
April		Alexey Brodovitch
May	—N/a	Sara Johns
June	Betty Bridgers	Genevieve Naylor
July		Alexey Brodovitch
August		Jean Cocteau
September	—N/a	Leonor Fini
October		Ben Rose
November	—N/a	Jean Cocteau
December	—N/a	Corrado Cagli

=== 1947 ===
Issue	Cover model	Photographer/Illustrator
January	Natálie Nickerson	Richard Avedon
February	—N/a	
March		Leslie Gill
April	—N/a	Ernst Beadle
May	—N/a	Saul Steinberg
June	—N/a	Leonor Fini
July		Louise Dahl-Wolfe
August		Louise Dahl-Wolfe
September	Betty Threatt	Louise Dahl-Wolfe
October		Ernst Beadle
November	Sylvie Hirsch	Louise Dahl-Wolfe
December		Richard Avedon

=== 1948 ===
Issue	Cover model	Photographer/Illustrator
January	—N/a	Sara John
February	Betty Bridgers	Richard Avedon
March		Richard Avedon
April	Betty Bridges; Evelyn Tripp	Louise Dahl-Wolfe
May	Virginia Stewart	Louise Dahl-Wolfe
June		Louise Dahl-Wolfe
July		Richard Avedon
August	Evelyn Tripp	Louise Dahl-Wolfe
September	—N/a	Louise Dahl-Wolfe
October	—N/a	Ernst Beadle
November	Liz Pringle	Louise Dahl-Wolfe
December		Ernst Beadle

=== 1949 ===
Issue	Cover model	Photographer
January	Leslie Ames	Louise Dahl-Wolfe
February	Georgia Hamilton	Genevieve Naylor
March	—N/a	Leslie Gill
April	Mary Jane Russell	Louise Dahl-Wolfe
May	Barbara Mullen	Richard Avedon
June	Sandra Nelson	Louise Dahl-Wolfe
July	Sandra Nelson	Louise Dahl-Wolfe
August		Louise Dahl-Wolfe
September	Liz Pringle	Louise Dahl-Wolfe
October	Kitty Kopet	Louise Dahl-Wolfe
November	Betty Threat	Louise Dahl-Wolfe
December	Dorian Leigh	Richard Avedon

== 1950s ==
=== 1950 ===
Issue	Cover model	Photographer
January	Betty Threat	Louise Dahl-Wolfe
February	Mary Jane Russell	Genevieve Naylor
March	Mary Jane Russell; Liz Pringle	Louise Dahl-Wolfe
April	Barbara Mullen	Richard Avedon
May		Richard Avedon
June	Liz Pringle	Louise Dahl-Wolfe
July	Barbara Mullen	Richard Avedon
August	Cherry Nelms	Karen Radkai
September	Liz Pringle	Louise Dahl-Wolfe
October	Liz Pringle	Louise Dahl-Wolfe
November	Dovima	Richard Avedon
December	Jackie Stoloff	Richard Avedon

=== 1951 ===
Issue	Cover model	Photographer
January	Dovima	Richard Avedon
February	Cherry Nelms	Richard Avedon
March	Sunny Harnett	Richard Avedon
April	Dovima	Richard Avedon
May	Suzy Parker	Louise Dahl-Wolfe
June	Barbara Mullen	Richard Avedon
July	Ricki VanDusen	Louise Dahl-Wolfe
August	Vikki Dougan	Louise Dahl-Wolfe
September	—N/a	Richard Avedon
October	Regine Debrise	Karen Radkai
November	Mary Jane Russell	Louise Dahl-Wolfe
December	Mary Jane Russell	Louise Dahl-Wolfe

=== 1952 ===
Issue	Cover model	Photographer
January	Mary Jane Russell	Richard Avedon
February	Dovima	Richard Avedon
March	Barbara Mullen	Richard Avedon
April	Mary Jane Russell	Louise Dahl-Wolfe
May	Evelyn Tripp	Richard Avedon
June	Evelyn Tripp	Louise Dahl-Wolfe
July	Georgia Hamilton	Richard Avedon
August		Louise Dahl-Wolfe
September	Suzy Parker	Richard Avedon
October	Mary Jane Russell	Louise Dahl-Wolfe
November	Dorian Leigh	Richard Avedon
December	Suzy Parker	Richard Avedon

=== 1953 ===
Issue	Cover model	Photographer
January	Jean Patchett	Louise Dahl-Wolfe
February	Sunny Harnett	Richard Avedon
March	Georgia Hamilton	Louise Dahl-Wolfe
April	Mary Jane Russell	Louise Dahl-Wolfe
May	Cherry Nelms	Louise Dahl-Wolfe
June	Jean Patchett	Louise Dahl-Wolfe
July	Barbara Mullen	Lillian Bassman
August	Evelyn Tripp	Louise Dahl-Wolfe
September	Georgia Hamilton	Richard Avedon
October	Mary Jane Russell	Louise Dahl-Wolfe
November	Evelyn Tripp	Louise Dahl-Wolfe
December	Evelyn Tripp	Louise Dahl-Wolfe

=== 1954 ===
Issue	Cover model	Photographer
January	Evelyn Tripp	Louise Dahl-Wolfe
February	Georgia Hamilton	Richard Avedon
March	Mary Jane Russell	Louise Dahl-Wolfe
April	Evelyn Tripp	Louise Dahl-Wolfe
May	Georgia Hamilton	Richard Avedon
June	Evelyn Tripp	Lillian Bassman
July	Sunny Harnett	Richard Avedon
August	Evelyn Tripp	Louise Dahl-Wolfe
September		Richard Avedon
October	Cherry Nelms	Richard Avedon
November	Jean Patchett	Louise Dahl-Wolfe
December	Sunny Harnett	Richard Avedon

=== 1955 ===
Issue	Cover model	Photographer
January	Jean Patchett	Louise Dahl-Wolfe
February	Dovima; Sunny Harnett	Richard Avedon
March		Richard Avedon
April	Liz Pringle	Richard Avedon
May	Suzy Parker	Richard Avedon
June	Evelyn Tripp	Louise Dahl-Wolfe
July	Dorian Leigh	Richard Avedon
August	Evelyn Tripp	Louise Dahl-Wolfe
September		Richard Avedon
October	Dovima	Richard Avedon
November	Dovima	Richard Avedon
December	Evelyn Tripp	Louise Dahl-Wolfe

=== 1956 ===
Issue	Cover model	Photographer/Illustrator
January	Pat Otis	Louise Dahl-Wolfe
February	—N/a	
March		Louise Dahl-Wolfe
April	Audrey Hepburn	Richard Avedon
May	Suzy Parker	Richard Avedon
June	—N/a	
July	—N/a	Sara Johns
August	Suzy Parker	Richard Avedon
September		Richard Avedon
October	Audrey Hepburn	Richard Avedon
November		Leslie Gill
December	Anne St. Marie	Richard Avedon

=== 1957 ===
Issue	Cover model	Photographer
January	Suzy Parker	Richard Avedon
February	Suzy Parker	Richard Avedon
March		Richard Avedon
April	Mary Jane Russell	Richard Avedon
May	Audrey Hepburn	Richard Avedon
June	Jessica Ford	Louise Dahl-Wolfe
July	Isabella Albonico	Louise Dahl-Wolfe
August	Dolores Hawkins	Louise Dahl-Wolfe
September	Isabella Albonico	Gleb Derujinsky
October	Carmen Dell'Orefice	Richard Avedon
November	Iris Bianchi	Louise Dahl-Wolfe
December	—N/a	Leslie Gill

=== 1958 ===
Issue	Cover model	Photographer
January	Ruth Neumann Derujinsky	Gleb Derujinsky
February	Ghislaine Arsac	Louise Dahl-Wolfe
March	Dolores Hawkins	Richard Avedon
April	Ivy Nicholson	Louise Dahl-Wolfe
May	Carmen Dell'Orefice	Gleb Derujinsky
June	Tan Arnold	Louise Dahl-Wolfe
July	Ruth Neumann Derujinsky	Gleb Derujinsky
August	Sunny Harnett; Dolores Hawkins; Linda Harper	Richard Avedon
September	Betsy Pickering	Richard Avedon
October		Richard Avedon
November	Isabella Albonico	Hiro
December	Dovima	Richard Avedon

=== 1959 ===
Issue	Cover model	Photographer/Illustrator
January	Suzy Parker	Richard Avedon
February		Hiro
March		Ben Rose
April	Simone D'Aillencourt	Saul Leiter
May	Carmen Dell'Orefice	Gleb Derujinsky
June	Simone D'Aillencourt	Gleb Derujinsky
July	Carmen Dell'Orefice	Ben Somoroff
August	Ruth Neumann Derujinsky	Gleb Derujinsky
September	—N/a	
October	Nena von Schlebrügge	Richard Avedon
November	Ruth Neumann Derujinsky	Hiro
December	Dovima	Richard Avedon

== 1960s ==
=== 1960 ===
Issue	Cover model	Photographer
January	Nena von Schlebrügge	Richard Avedon
February	Simone D'Aillencourt	Richard Avedon
March		Hiro
April	Isabella Albonico	Melvin Sokolsky
May	Nena von Schlebrügge	Melvin Sokolsky
June	Ruth Neumann Derujinsky	Gleb Derujinsky
July	Simone D'Aillencourt	Melvin Sokolsky
August	Simone D'Aillencourt	Gleb Derujinsky
September	Suzy Parker (Foldout Cover)	Richard Avedon
October	Simone D'Aillencourt	Melvin Sokolsky
November	Ruth Neumann Derujinsky	Gleb Derujinsky
December	Isabella Albonico	Melvin Sokolsky

=== 1961 ===
Issue	Cover model	Photographer
January	Marola Witt	Richard Avedon
February		Hiro
March	Tamara Nyman	Louis Faurer
April	Tamara Nyman (Foldout Cover)	Saul Leiter
May	Tamara Nyman	Melvin Sokolsky
June	Summer Alert! (Illustration)	Lillian Bassman
July	Ivy Nicholson (Foldout Cover)	Richard Avedon
August	Simone D'Aillencourt	Melvin Sokolsky
September	Sophia Loren (Foldout Cover)	Richard Avedon
October	Maria Solar	Hiro
November	Hiroko Matsumoto	Richard Avedon
December	Marola Witt (Foldout Cover)	Richard Avedon

=== 1962 ===
Issue	Cover model	Photographer
January	Nena von Schlebrügge	Gleb Derujinsky
February	Isabella Albonico	Louis Faurer
March	Ruth Neuman Derujinsky	Melvin Sokolsky
April	(Foldout Cover); Tilly Tizzani	Melvin Sokolsky
May	Suzy Parker	Richard Avedon
June	Sondra Peterson	Saul Leiter
July	(Foldout Cover); Maggi Eckardt	Tom Kublin
August	Iris Bianchi	Melvin Sokolsky
September	(Foldout Cover); Tamara Nyman	Saul Leiter
October	(Foldout Cover)	Richard Avedon
November	Tilly Tizzani	Hiro
December	Pamela Barkington	Hiro

=== 1963 ===
Issue	Cover model	Photographer
January	Danny Weil	Richard Avedon
February	(Foldout Cover); Christina Bellin	Saul Leiter
March	Simone D'Aillencourt	Melvin Sokolsky
April	Susan van Wyck	Richard Avedon
May	Tilly Tizzani	Hiro
June	Brigitte Bauer	Hiro
July	Isabella Albonico; Iris Bianchi	Melvin Sokolsky
August	(Foldout Cover)	Saul Leiter
September	Dorothy McGowan	Richard Avedon
October	(Foldout Cover)	Saul Leiter
November	Donna Mitchell	Melvin Sokolsky
December	(Foldout Cover); Antonia Boeyesteijn	Melvin Sokolsky

=== 1964 ===
Issue	Cover model	Photographer
January		Richard Avedon
February	Mirella Petteni	Hiro
March	Tilly Tizzani (Foldout Cover)	Hiro
April	Deborah Dixon	Melvin Sokolsky
May		James Moore
June	Tilly Tizzani	Hiro
July	Tilly Tizzani	Hiro
August	Kecia Nyman	Richard Avedon
September	Jean Shrimpton (Foldout Cover)	David Bailey
October	Dorothy McGowan (Foldout Cover)	Hiro
November	Antonia	Melvin Sokolsky
December		Melvin Sokolsky

=== 1965 ===
Issue	Cover model	Photographer
January	Donyale Luna	Katharina Denzinger
February	Steve McQueen	Richard Avedon
March	Donna Mitchell	Bob Richardson
April	Jean Shrimpton	Richard Avedon
May	Naty Abascal	Richard Avedon
June	Tilly Tizzani	Hiro
July	Donna Mitchell	Bob Richardson
August	Vicki Hilbert (Foldout Cover)	Richard Avedon
September	(Foldout Cover); Jean Shrimpton; Ina Balke	Richard Avedon; Katharina Denzinger
October	Antonia	Louis Faurer
November	Jean Shrimpton	Richard Avedon
December	Sophia Loren	Richard Avedon

=== 1966 ===
Issue	Cover model	Photographer
January	Sandy Hilton	Hiro
February	Marisa Berenson	Bill Silano
March	(Foldout Cover)	Hiro
April	Beate Schultz	James Moore
May	Beate Schultz	James Moore
June		Hiro
July	Isa Stoppi	James Moore
August	Benedetta Barzini (Foldout Cover)	James Moore
September	(Foldout Cover)	Hiro
October	(Foldout Cover); Unknown; Beate Schultz	James Moore
November	Dorothy McGowan	Francesco Scavullo
December	Paula Pritchett	Hiro

=== 1967 ===
Issue	Cover model	Photographer
January	Lauren Hutton	James Moore
February	Alberta Tiburzi	Hiro
March	Astrid Schiller	Neal Barr
April	Beate Schultz	James Moore
May		Frank Horvat
June	Julie Andrews	James Moore
July		Hiro
August	Agneta Darin (Foldout Cover)	Hiro
September	(Foldout Cover); Alberta Tiburiz; Marisa Berenson	Neal Barr
October	Naty Abascal	Bill Silano
November		Frank Horvat
December	Lucy Angle	Neal Barr

=== 1968 ===
Issue	Cover model	Photographer
January	Cynthia Korman	Bill Silano
February	Isa Stoppi; Warren Beatty	Louis Faurer
March	Moyra Swan, Susan Blakely	James Moore
April	Marola Witt	Guy Bourdin
May	Cathee Dahmen	Neal Barr
June	Ingmari Lamy	Bill King
July	Berkley Johnson	Bill Silano
August	Ingmari Lamy	Bill King
September	Berkley Johnson (Foldout Cover)	Hiro
October	Donna Mitchell	Hiro
November	Unknown; Dustin Hoffman (Foldout Cover)	James Moore
December	Heide Wiedeck	Hiro

=== 1969 ===
Issue	Cover model	Photographer
January	Lauren Hutton	Bill Silano
February	Karen Graham	Hiro
March	Heide Wiedeck	James Moore
April	Donna Mitchell	Hiro
May	Heide Wiedeck	Francesco Scavullo
June		James Moore
July		Alberto Rizzo
August		Guy Bourdin
September		Neal Barr
October	Stephanie Farrow	Hiro
November	Princess Elizabeth of Toro; Mimsy Farmer	Bill King
December	Berkley Johnson	Hiro

== 1970s ==
=== 1970 ===
Issue	Cover model	Photographer
January		Alberto Rizzo
February	Jane Hitchcock	James Moore
March	Lynn Kohlman	Bill King
April		Hiro
May	Lauren Hutton; Art Shamsky	Bill King
June	Jolina Zandueta	Hiro
July	Louise Despointes	Guy Bourdin
August	Gunilla Lindblad	Hiro
September	Susanne Schöneborn	Bill King
October	Susanne Schöneborn	Bill King
November	Barbara Carrera; Elnora Waring	Hiro
December	Susanne Schöneborn	Bill King

=== 1971 ===
Issue	Cover model	Photographer
January	Barbara Carrera	Hiro
February	Lynn Sutherland; Unknown	Bill King
March	Beska Sorensen	Hiro
April	China Machado	Bill King
May	Lauren Hutton	Hiro
June	Mona Grant	Chris von Wangenheim
July	Beska Sorensen	Hiro
August	Therese Bohlin	Bill King
September	Kristie Embertson	Chris von Wangenheim
October	Ingrid Boulting	Alberto Rizzo
November	Raquel Welch	Bill King
December		

=== 1972 ===
Issue	Cover model	Photographer
January	Barbara Allen	Bill King
February	Bill Blass; Oscar de la Renta; Betsey Johnson; Geoffrey Beene; John Anthony; Donald Brooks; Anne Klein; Kasper; Halston; Pauline Trigère; Chester Weinberg; Victor Joris	James Hamilton
March	Suzy; Rex Reed	Bill King
April	Chris Evert	James Hamilton
May	Marisa Berenson	Hiro
June	Pam Suthern	Hiro
July	Jennifer O'Neill	Hiro
August	Lauren Hutton; Cliff Robertson	Bill King
September	Lauren Hutton	Bill King
October	Ali MacGraw	Bill King
November	Barbra Streisand	Steve Schapiro
December		Hiro

=== 1973 ===
Issue	Cover model	Photographer
January	Liza Minnelli	Hiro
February	Serena Rhinelander	Francesco Scavullo
March	Susan Hutton	James Moore
April	Pilar Crespi	Francesco Scavullo
May	Serena Rhinelander	Rico Puhlmann
June	Jan Cushing	Rico Puhlmann
July	Kitty Hawks	Rico Puhlmann
August	Dina Merrill	Barry McKinley
September	Serena Rhinelander	Neal Barr
October	Pam Suthern	Neal Barr
November	Serena Rhinelander	Francesco Scavullo
December	Pam Suthern	James Moore

=== 1974 ===
Issue	Cover model	Photographer
January	Anna Hitchcock	Neal Barr
February	Stephanie-Louise	Rico Puhlmann
March	Lois Chiles	Rico Puhlmann
April	Pam Suthern	Rico Puhlmann
May	Stephanie-Louise	Rico Puhlmann
June	Cheryl Tiegs	Rico Puhlmann
July	Candice Bergen	Rico Puhlmann
August	Pam Suthern	Rico Puhlmann
September	Stephanie-Louise	Rico Puhlmann
October	Cheryl Tiegs	Rico Puhlmann
November	Cristina Ford	Neal Barr
December	Cristina Ferrare	Barry McKinley

=== 1975 ===
Issue	Cover model	Photographer
January	Cheryl Tiegs	Patrick Demarchelier
February	Pam Suthern	James Moore
March	Anne Holbrook	Rico Puhlmann
April	Pam Suthern	James Moore
May	Candice Bergen	Rico Puhlmann
June	Cristina Ferrare	Rico Puhlmann
July	Cheryl Tiegs	Rico Puhlmann
August	Grace Kelly, Princess of Monaco	Patrick Demarchelier
September	Dayle Haddon	Rico Puhlmann
October	Cheryl Tiegs	Rico Puhlmann
November	Shelley Smith	David McCabe
December	Liza Minnelli	Bill King

=== 1976 ===
Issue	Cover model	Photographer
January	Cristina Ferrare	Bill King
February	Cheryl Tiegs	Bill King
March	Barbara Minty	Rico Puhlmann
April	Cheryl Tiegs	Rico Puhlmann
May	Shelley Smith	William Connors
June	Cheryl Tiegs	Bob Stone
July	Maud Adams	David McCabe
August	Cristina Ferrare	Bill King
September	Cheryl Tiegs	Rico Puhlmann
October	Deborah Collette	Bill King
November	Margaux Hemingway	Bob Stone
December	Hellen Högberg	Bob Stone

=== 1977 ===
Issue	Cover model	Photographer
January	Cheryl Tiegs	Bob Stone
February	Cheryl Tiegs	William Connors
March	Cristina Ferrare	Bill King
April	Shelley Smith	Bob Stone
May	Farrah Fawcett	Bill King
June	Lisa Taylor	Patrick Demarchelier
July	Cheryl Tiegs	Rico Puhlmann
August	Cristina Ferrare	Albert Watson
September	Lisa Taylor	Bill King
October	Rene Russo	Bill King
November	Margaux Hemingway	Marco Glaviano
December	Cristina Ferrare	Albert Watson

=== 1978 ===
Issue	Cover model	Photographer
January	Cristina Ferrare	Albert Watson
February	Yasmine Sokal Guenancia	Bob Stone
March	Liza Minnelli	Bill King
April	Farrah Fawcett	Rico Puhlmann
May	Cheryl Tiegs	Marco Glaviano
June	Christie Brinkley	Rico Puhlmann
July	Cheryl Tiegs	Bill King
August	Cristina Ferrare	Bill King
September	Jaclyn Smith	Bill King
October	Farrah Fawcett	Bill King
November	Denise Hopkins	Albert Watson
December	Maria Hansen	Albert Watson

=== 1979 ===
Issue	Cover model	Photographer
January	Cheryl Tiegs	Bob Stone
February	Christie Brinkley	Bill King
March	Patti Hansen	Rico Puhlmann
April	Shelley Smith	Bob Stone
May	Lisa Taylor	Bill King
June	Jaclyn Smith	Bill King
July	Cheryl Tiegs	Bill King
August	Cheryl Tiegs	Bill King
September	Rene Russo	Francesco Scavullo
October	Nancy Donahue	Rico Puhlmann
November	Elizabeth Taylor	Bill King
December	Patti Hansen	Albert Watson

== 1980s ==
=== 1980 ===
Issue	Cover model	Photographer
January	Dayle Haddon	Bill King
February	Bitten Knudsen	Bill King
March	Shaun Casey	Les Goldberg
April	Brooke Shields	Bill King
May	Shelley Smith	Bill King
June	Cheryl Tiegs	Rico Puhlmann
July	Bitten Knudsen	Albert Watson
August	Valerie Lohr	Bill King
September	Eva Voorhees	Albert Watson
October	Sophia Loren	Albert Watson
November	Rene Russo	Francesco Scavullo
December	Eva Voorhees	Albert Watson

=== 1981 ===
Issue	Cover model	Photographer
January	Shelley Smith	Bill King
February	Cristina Ferrare	Bill King
March	Cristina Ferrare	Bill King
April	Patti Hansen	Albert Watson
May	Shaun Casey	Patrick Demarchelier
June	Nancy DeWier	Rico Puhlmann
July	Cheryl Tiegs	Francesco Scavullo
August	Brooke Shields	Francesco Scavullo
September	Elizabeth Taylor	Francesco Scavullo
October	Shelley Smith	Bill King
November	Brooke Shields	Francesco Scavullo
December	Bitten Knudsen	Albert Watson

=== 1982 ===
Issue	Cover model	Photographer
January	Shaun Casey	Francesco Scavullo
February	Carol Alt	Francesco Scavullo
March	Nancy DeWier	Francesco Scavullo
April	Kim Alexis	Francesco Scavullo
May	Shaun Casey	Patrick Demarchelier
June	Brooke Shields	Francesco Scavullo
July	Kelly Emberg	Patrick Demarchelier
August	Isabella Rossellini	Francesco Scavullo
September	Grace Kelly, Princess of Monaco	Francesco Scavullo
October	Raquel Welch	Patrick Demarchelier
November	Farrah Fawcett	Patrick Demarchelier
December	Kim Alexis	James Moore

=== 1983 ===
Issue	Cover model	Photographer
January	Shaun Casey	Les Goldberg
February	Jaclyn Smith	Les Goldberg
March	Kim Alexis	Francesco Scavullo
April	Isabella Rossellini	Francesco Scavullo
May	Christie Brinkley	Francesco Scavullo
June	Jaclyn Smith	Les Goldberg
July	Nancy DeWier	Rico Puhlmann
August	Victoria Principal	Patrick Demarchelier
September	Elizabeth Taylor	Francesco Scavullo
October	Farrah Fawcett	Patrick Demarchelier
November	Barbra Streisand	Francesco Scavullo
December	Christie Brinkley	Francesco Scavullo

=== 1984 ===
Issue	Cover model	Photographer
January	Kim Alexis	Rico Puhlmann
February	Jennifer Beals	Marco Glaviano
March	Nancy DeWier	Rico Puhlmann
April	Cheryl Tiegs	Francesco Scavullo
May	Christie Brinkley	Patrick Demarchelier
June	Kirsten Allen	Rico Puhlmann
July	Anette Stai	Rico Puhlmann
August	Linda Gray	Marco Glaviano
September	Linda Evans	Michael Reinhardt
October	Victoria Principal	Patrick Demarchelier
November	Christie Brinkley	Francesco Scavullo
December	Kelly LeBrock	Francesco Scavullo

=== 1985 ===
Issue	Cover model	Photographer
January	Jennifer Burry	Rico Puhlmann
February	Kim Alexis	Francesco Scavullo
March	Isabella Rossellini	Francesco Scavullo
April	Renée Simonsen	Francesco Scavullo
May	Paulina Porizkova	Marco Glaviano
June	Kim Alexis	Francesco Scavullo
July	Kirsten Allen	Rico Puhlmann
August	Joan Collins	Rico Puhlmann
September	Linda Evans	Melvin Sokolsky
October	Kim Alexis	Francesco Scavullo
November	Renée Simonsen	Francesco Scavullo
December	Kirsten Allen	Marco Glaviano

=== 1986 ===
Issue	Cover model	Photographer
January	Kim Alexis	Francesco Scavullo
February	Renée Simonsen	Rico Puhlmann
March	Carol Alt	Marco Glaviano
April	Catherine Oxenberg	Francesco Scavullo
May	Victoria Principal	Marco Glaviano
June	Kirsten Allen	Rico Puhlmann
July	Jennifer Burry	Rico Puhlmann
August	Linda Evans	Melvin Sokolsky
September	Cybill Shepherd	Francesco Scavullo
October	Jeanette Hallen	Rico Puhlmann
November	Sandra Zatezalo	Marco Glaviano
December	Christie Brinkley	Francesco Scavullo

=== 1987 ===
Issue	Cover model	Photographer
January	Laura Valentine	Marco Glaviano
February	Isabella Rossellini	Francesco Scavullo
March	Ashley Richardson	Rico Puhlmann
April	Frederique van der Wal	Francesco Scavullo
May	Paulina Porizkova	Francesco Scavullo
June	Cindy Crawford	Rico Puhlmann
July	Kim Alexis	Marco Glaviano
August	Farrah Fawcett	Marco Glaviano
September	Lisa Bonet	Matthew Rolston
October	Christy Turlington	Francesco Scavullo
November	Paulina Porizkova	Francesco Scavullo
December	Andie MacDowell	Francesco Scavullo

=== 1988 ===
Issue	Cover model	Photographer
January	Kim Alexis	Francesco Scavullo
February	Cindy Crawford	Francesco Scavullo
March	Maria Shriver	Marco Glaviano
April	Christy Turlington	Francesco Scavullo
May	Madonna	Francesco Scavullo
June	Louise Vyent	Rico Puhlmann
July	Paulina Porizkova	Marco Glaviano
August	Jacqueline Bisset	Marco Glaviano
September	Cindy Crawford	Marco Glaviano
October	Mel Harris	Jacques Malignon
November	Cindy Crawford	Francesco Scavullo
December	Ashley Richardson	Rico Puhlmann

=== 1989 ===
Issue	Cover model	Photographer
January	Carré Otis	Matthew Rolston
February	Mystee Bechenbach	Rico Puhlmann
March	Isabella Rossellini	Matthew Rolston
April	Sean Young	Matthew Rolston
May	Julie Anderson	
June	Suzanne Lanza	Phillip Dixon
July	Estelle Lefébure	Matthew Rolston
August	Candice Bergen	Matthew Rolston
September	Jodie Foster	Matthew Rolston
October	Josie Borain	Matthew Rolston
November	Amanda Pays	Phillip Dixon
December	Ruvé Watts	

== 1990s ==
=== 1990 ===
Issue	Cover model	Photographer
January	Carré Otis	Matthew Rolston
February	Karen Alexander	Matthew Rolston
March	Tatjana Patitz	Matthew Rolston
April	Cindy Crawford	Rico Puhlmann
May	Stephanie Seymour	Matthew Rolston
June	Madonna	Jean-Baptiste Mondino
July	Goldie Hawn	Matthew Rolston
August	Jaclyn Smith	Matthew Rolston
September	Julia Roberts	Matthew Rolston
October	Isabella Rossellini	Rico Puhlmann
November	Melanie Griffith	Matthew Rolston
December	Sean Young	Francesco Scavullo

=== 1991 ===
Issue	Cover model	Photographer
January	Winona Ryder	Matthew Rolston
February	Cybill Shepherd	Matthew Rolston
March	Candice Bergen	Matthew Rolston
April	Meg Ryan	Matthew Rolston
May	Geena Davis	Matthew Rolston
June	Nicole Kidman	Phillip Dixon
July	Andie MacDowell	Matthew Rolston
August	Lauren Hutton; Dayle Haddon	Phillip Dixon
September	Annette Bening	Matthew Rolston
October	Claudia Schiffer	Torkil Gudnason
November	Jodie Foster	Matthew Rolston
December	Sherilyn Fenn	Matthew Rolston

=== 1992 ===
Issue	Cover model	Photographer
January	Carré Otis	Torkil Gudnason
February	Cathy Fedoruk	Matthew Rolston
March	Elaine Irwin	Phillip Dixon
April	Helena Christensen	Matthew Rolston
May	Niki Taylor	Rico Puhlmann
June	Collage: Laura Dern; Iman; Vanessa Williams; Anjelica Huston; Paulina Porizkova; Debra Winger; Geena Davis; Naomi Campbell; Robin Wright	
July	Christy Turlington	Patrick Demarchelier
August	Cindy Crawford	Patrick Demarchelier
September	Linda Evangelista	Patrick Demarchelier
October	Christy Turlington	Patrick Demarchelier
November	Anja Kneller	Patrick Demarchelier
December	Kate Moss	Patrick Demarchelier

=== 1993 ===
Issue	Cover model	Photographer
January	Meghan Douglas; Kate Moss; Patricia Hartmann	Peter Lindbergh
February	Kristen McMenamy	Patrick Demarchelier
March	Nadja Auermann; Cecilia Chancellor	Patrick Demarchelier
April	Nadja Auermann	Patrick Demarchelier
May	Christy Turlington	Peter Lindbergh
June	Amber Valletta	Patrick Demarchelier
July	Kate Moss	Patrick Demarchelier
August	Linda Evangelista	Patrick Demarchelier
September	Christy Turlington	Patrick Demarchelier
October	Amber Valletta	Patrick Demarchelier
November	Christy Turlington	Patrick Demarchelier
December	Daryl Hannah	Peter Lindbergh

=== 1994 ===
Issue	Cover model	Photographer
January	Christy Turlington; Christian Slater	Patrick Demarchelier
February	Linda Evangelista	Patrick Demarchelier
March	Claudia Schiffer	Patrick Demarchelier
April	Kate Moss	Enrique Badulescu
May	Madonna	Peter Lindbergh
June	Naomi Campbell	Patrick Demarchelier
July	Kirsty Hume	Patrick Demarchelier
August	Linda Evangelista	Patrick Demarchelier
September	Nadja Auermann	Patrick Demarchelier
October	Claudia Schiffer	Patrick Demarchelier
November	Nadja Auermann	Patrick Demarchelier
December	Winona Ryder	Patrick Demarchelier

=== 1995 ===
Issue	Cover model	Photographer
January	Linda Evangelista	Patrick Demarchelier
February	Shalom Harlow	Patrick Demarchelier
March	Claudia Schiffer	Patrick Demarchelier
April	Jaime Rishar	Patrick Demarchelier
May	Elizabeth Hurley	Patrick Demarchelier
June	Uma Thurman	Patrick Demarchelier
July	Cindy Crawford	Peter Lindbergh
August	Linda Evangelista	Patrick Demarchelier
September	Julia Roberts	Peter Lindbergh
October	Kirsty Hume	Patrick Demarchelier
November	Sharon Stone	Peter Lindbergh
December	Diana, Princess of Wales	Patrick Demarchelier

=== 1996 ===
Issue	Cover model	Photographer
January	Whitney Houston	Patrick Demarchelier
February	Niki Taylor	Patrick Demarchelier
March	Nicole Kidman	Patrick Demarchelier
April	Cindy Crawford	Patrick Demarchelier
May	Amber Valletta	Patrick Demarchelier
June	Shalom Harlow; Amber Valletta	Patrick Demarchelier
July	Christy Turlington; Naomi Campbell	Patrick Demarchelier
August	Niki Taylor	Patrick Demarchelier
September	Elizabeth Hurley; Hugh Grant	Patrick Demarchelier
October	Caroline, Princess of Monaco	Karl Lagerfeld
November	Kate Moss	Patrick Demarchelier
December	Drew Barrymore	Peter Lindbergh

=== 1997 ===
Issue	Cover model	Photographer
January	Daniel Day-Lewis; Winona Ryder	Patrick Demarchelier
February	Stella Tennant	Patrick Demarchelier
March	Linda Evangelista	Patrick Demarchelier
April	Amber Valletta	Patrick Demarchelier
May	Tasha Tilberg; Georgina Grenville; Sharon van der Knaap; Chandra North; Danielle Zinaich	Patrick Demarchelier
June	Julia Roberts	Patrick Demarchelier
July	Georgina Grenville	Patrick Demarchelier
August	Demi Moore	Patrick Demarchelier
September	Courtney Love	Patrick Demarchelier
October	Cindy Crawford	Patrick Demarchelier
November	Diana, Princess of Wales	Patrick Demarchelier
December	Gwyneth Paltrow	Patrick Demarchelier

=== 1998 ===
Issue	Cover model	Photographer
January	Kate Moss	Patrick Demarchelier
February	Sharon Stone	Terry Richardson
March	Uma Thurman	Patrick Demarchelier
April	Fiona Apple	Patrick Demarchelier
May	Kate Moss	Patrick Demarchelier
June	Bridget Hall	Patrick Demarchelier
July	Shalom Harlow	Patrick Demarchelier
August	Cameron Diaz; Matt Dillon	Patrick Demarchelier
September	Calista Flockhart	Patrick Demarchelier
October	Amber Valletta	Patrick Demarchelier
November	Bridget Hall	Patrick Demarchelier
December	Meg Ryan	Patrick Demarchelier

=== 1999 ===
Issue	Cover model	Photographer
January	John Travolta; Kelly Preston	Patrick Demarchelier
February	Madonna	Patrick Demarchelier
March	Elizabeth Hurley	Patrick Demarchelier
April	Sandra Bullock; Ben Affleck	Patrick Demarchelier
May	Helen Hunt	Patrick Demarchelier
June	Courteney Cox	Patrick Demarchelier
July	Tom Cruise	Patrick Demarchelier
August	Gisele Bündchen	Wayne Maser
September	Lauryn Hill	Patrick Demarchelier
October	Michelle Pfeiffer	Patrick Demarchelier
November	Carmen Kass	Patrick Demarchelier
December	Carolyn Murphy	Mikael Jansson

== 2000s ==
=== 2000 ===
Issue	Cover model	Photographer
January	Gisele Bündchen	Mikael Jansson
February	Gwyneth Paltrow	Craig McDean
March	Julia Roberts	Mikael Jansson
April	Gisele Bündchen	Patrick Demarchelier
May	Frankie; Missy Rayder	Mikael Jansson
June	Caroline Ribeiro	Patrick Demarchelier
July	Carolyn Murphy	Patrick Demarchelier
August	Winona Ryder	Craig McDean
September	Amy Lemons	Craig McDean
October	Cameron Diaz	Craig McDean
November	Uma Thurman	Craig McDean
December	Penélope Cruz	Craig McDean

=== 2001 ===
Issue	Cover model	Photographer
January	Meg Ryan	Patrick Demarchelier
February	Sarah Jessica Parker	Patrick Demarchelier
March	Kate Hudson	Patrick Demarchelier
April	Ashley Judd	Patrick Demarchelier
May	Chloë Sevigny	Patrick Demarchelier
June	Gisele Bündchen; Patricia Bündchen	Mikael Jansson
July	Julia Roberts	Mikael Jansson
August	Britney Spears	Patrick Demarchelier
September	Nicole Kidman	Patrick Demarchelier
October	Cate Blanchett	Patrick Demarchelier
November	Gwyneth Paltrow	Patrick Demarchelier
December	Meg Ryan	Patrick Demarchelier

=== 2002 ===
Issue	Cover model	Photographer
January	Cameron Diaz	Patrick Demarchelier
February	Gisele Bündchen	Patrick Demarchelier
March	Carolyn Murphy	Patrick Demarchelier
April	Kate Moss	Sølve Sundsbø
May	Gisele Bündchen	Patrick Demarchelier
June	Christy Turlington	Patrick Demarchelier
July	Renée Zellweger	Patrick Demarchelier
August	Elizabeth Hurley	Patrick Demarchelier
September	Drew Barrymore	Patrick Demarchelier
October	Michelle Pfeiffer	Patrick Demarchelier
November	Liv Tyler	Patrick Demarchelier
December	Jennifer Lopez	Peter Lindbergh

=== 2003 ===
Issue	Cover model	Photographer
January	Kate Winslet	Patrick Demarchelier
February	Gisele Bündchen	Patrick Demarchelier
March	Ashley Judd	Patrick Demarchelier
April	Penélope Cruz	Peter Lindbergh
May	Jennifer Aniston	Patrick Demarchelier
June	Cameron Diaz; Drew Barrymore; Lucy Liu	Patrick Demarchelier
July	Jennifer Connelly	Patrick Demarchelier
August	Debra Messing	Patrick Demarchelier
September	Madonna	Regan Cameron
October	Catherine Zeta-Jones	Peter Lindbergh
November	Meg Ryan	Patrick Demarchelier
December	Salma Hayek	Patrick Demarchelier

=== 2004 ===
Issue	Cover model	Photographer
January	Julia Roberts	Peter Lindbergh
February	Renée Zellweger	Patrick Demarchelier
March	Sarah Jessica Parker	Peter Lindbergh
April	Drew Barrymore	Patrick Demarchelier
May	Courteney Cox	Patrick Demarchelier
June	Beyoncé	Patrick Demarchelier
July	Ashley Judd	Patrick Demarchelier
August	Halle Berry	Peter Lindbergh
September	Gisele Bündchen	Peter Lindbergh
October	Kate Winslet	Peter Lindbergh
November	Nicole Kidman	Thomas Schenk
December	Catherine Zeta-Jones	Peter Lindbergh

=== 2005 ===
Issue	Cover model	Photographer
January	Scarlett Johansson	Peter Lindbergh
February	Teri Hatcher	Alexi Lubomirski
March	Gwen Stefani	Alexi Lubomirski
April	Goldie Hawn	Peter Lindbergh
May	Julia Stiles	Peter Lindbergh
June	Renée Zellweger	Alexi Lubomirski
July	Ashley Olsen	Peter Lindbergh
August	Cate Blanchett	Alexi Lubomirski
September	Demi Moore	Alexi Lubomirski
October	Charlize Theron	Peter Lindbergh
November	Catherine Zeta-Jones	Alexi Lubomirski
December	Kate Winslet	Peter Lindbergh

=== 2006 ===
Issue	Cover model	Photographer
January	Julianne Moore	Peter Lindbergh
February	Salma Hayek	Peter Lindbergh
March	Madonna	Sølve Sundsbø
April	Sharon Stone	Mario Sorrenti
May	Jennifer Lopez	Peter Lindbergh
June	Jennifer Aniston	Alexi Lubomirski
July	Lindsay Lohan	Alexi Lubomirski
August	Britney Spears	Alexi Lubomirski
September	Gwyneth Paltrow	Peter Lindbergh
October	Mischa Barton	Peter Lindbergh
November	Natalie Portman	Peter Lindbergh
December	Jennifer Lopez	Alexi Lubomirski

=== 2007 ===
Issue	Cover model	Photographer
January	Cameron Diaz; Kate Winslet	Peter Lindbergh
February	Drew Barrymore	Peter Lindbergh
March	Katie Holmes	Peter Lindbergh
April	Reese Witherspoon	Peter Lindbergh
May	Gwen Stefani	Peter Lindbergh
June	Paris Hilton; Nicole Richie	Peter Lindbergh
July	Anne Hathaway	Peter Lindbergh
August	Jessica Simpson	Peter Lindbergh
September	Kate Hudson	Peter Lindbergh
October	Mary-Kate Olsen	Peter Lindbergh
November	Jennifer Aniston	Alexi Lubomirski
December	Renée Zellweger	Peter Lindbergh

=== 2008 ===
Issue	Cover model	Photographer
January	Uma Thurman	Alexi Lubomirski
February	Jennifer Lopez	Peter Lindbergh
March	Lindsay Lohan	Peter Lindbergh
April	Demi Moore	Peter Lindbergh
May	Julianne Moore	Peter Lindbergh
June	Nicole Richie	Peter Lindbergh
July	Gwyneth Paltrow	Peter Lindbergh
August	Jessica Biel	Peter Lindbergh
September	Tyra Banks	Alexi Lubomirski
October	Kirsten Dunst	Alexi Lubomirski
November	Drew Barrymore	Alexi Lubomirski
December	Lindsay Lohan	Terry Richardson

=== 2009 ===
Issue	Cover model	Photographer
January	Victoria Beckham	Peter Lindbergh
February	Scarlett Johansson	Alexi Lubomirski
March	Sarah Jessica Parker	Peter Lindbergh
April	Gisele Bündchen	Peter Lindbergh
May	Halle Berry	Alexi Lubomirski
June	Sandra Bullock	Peter Lindbergh
July	Angelina Jolie	
August	Kate Winslet	Peter Lindbergh
September	Leighton Meester	Terry Richardson
October	Janet Jackson	Tom Munro
November	Tina Fey	Alexi Lubomirski
December	Kristen Stewart; Robert Pattinson	Mark Seliger

== 2010s ==
=== 2010 ===
Issue	Cover model	Photographer
January	Kate Hudson	Peter Lindbergh
February	Miley Cyrus	Peter Lindbergh
March	Kate Moss	Peter Lindbergh
April	Demi Moore	Mark Seliger
May	Gwyneth Paltrow	Alexi Lubomirski
June/July	Katherine Heigl	Alexi Lubomirski
August	Cameron Diaz	Terry Richardson
September	Jennifer Aniston	Mark Seliger
October	Drew Barrymore	Mark Seliger
November	Christina Hendricks	Terry Richardson
December	Katy Perry	Alexi Lubomirski

=== 2011 ===
Issue	Cover model	Photographer
January	Julianna Margulies	Alexi Lubomirski
February	Nicole Kidman	Alexi Lubomirski
March	Kim Kardashian	Terry Richardson
April	Courteney Cox	Terry Richardson
May	Lady Gaga	Terry Richardson
June/July	Britney Spears	Alexi Lubomirski
August	Anne Hathaway	Alexi Lubomirski
September	Lea Michele	Mark Seliger
October	Lady Gaga	Inez & Vinoodh
November	Beyoncé	Terry Richardson
December/January 2012	Madonna; Andrea Riseborough	Tom Munro

=== 2012 ===
Issue	Cover model	Photographer
February	Demi Moore	Cedric Buchet
March	Gwyneth Paltrow	Terry Richardson
April	Mila Kunis	Terry Richardson
May	Penélope Cruz	Terry Richardson
June/July	Kate Moss	Terry Richardson
August	Rihanna	Camilla Åkrans
September	Gwen Stefani	Terry Richardson
October	Kate Hudson	Camilla Åkrans
November	Nicole Kidman	Terry Richardson
December/January 2013	Taylor Swift	Paola Kudacki

=== 2013 ===
Issue	Cover model	Photographer
February	Jennifer Lopez	Katja Rahlwes
March	Drew Barrymore	Daniel Jackson
April	Selena Gomez	Terry Richardson
May	Gwyneth Paltrow	Daniel Jackson
June/July	Christy Turlington	Daniel Jackson
August	Sofía Vergara	Terry Richardson
September	Sarah Jessica Parker	Terry Richardson
October	Miley Cyrus	Terry Richardson
November	Madonna	Terry Richardson
December/January 2014	Kate Hudson	Alexi Lubomirski

=== 2014 ===
Issue	Cover model	Photographer
February	Daria Werbowy	Daniel Jackson
March	Lady Gaga	Terry Richardson
April	Lara Stone	Daniel Jackson
May	Kate Moss	Terry Richardson
June/July	Kate Winslet	Daniel Jackson
August	Cameron Diaz	Camilla Åkrans
September	Lady Gaga; Linda Evangelista; Penélope Cruz	Sebastian Faena
October	Katy Perry	Camilla Åkrans
November	Anne Hathaway	Alexi Lubomirski
December/January 2015	Jennifer Aniston	Melvin Sokolsky

=== 2015 ===
Issue	Cover model	Photographer
February	Miranda Kerr	Terry Richardson
March	Rihanna	Norman Jean Roy
April	Julianne Moore	Camilla Åkrans
May	Anna Ewers	Norman Jean Roy
June/July	Emilia Clarke	Norman Jean Roy
August	Natalie Portman	Norman Jean Roy
September	Katy Perry	Jean-Paul Goude
October	Sarah Jessica Parker	Alexi Lubomirski
November	Lena Dunham	Nathaniel Goldberg
December/January 2016	Kate Hudson	Terry Richardson

=== 2016 ===
Issue	Cover model	Photographer
February	Reese Witherspoon	Alexi Lubomirski
March	Drew Barrymore	Jean-Paul Goude
April	Jennifer Aniston	Camilla Åkrans
May	Jennifer Lawrence	Mario Sorrenti
June/July	Kendall Jenner	Karl Lagerfeld
August	Gwen Stefani	Alexi Lubomirski
September	Kanye West; Kim Kardashian	Karl Lagerfeld
October	Gigi Hadid	Karl Lagerfeld
November	Gwyneth Paltrow	Alexi Lubomirski
December/January 2017	Lady Gaga	Inez & Vinoodh

=== 2017 ===
Issue	Cover model	Photographer
February	Madonna	Luigi & Iango
March	Rihanna	Mariano Vivanco
April	Paris Jackson	Jean-Paul Goude
May	Kendall Jenner	Camilla Åkrans
June/July	Gigi Hadid	Mariano Vivanco
August	Miley Cyrus	Camilla Åkrans
September	Adriana Lima; The Weeknd; Irina Shayk	Brigitte Lacombe
October	Jennifer Aniston	Mariano Vivanco
November	Angelina Jolie	Alexi Lubomirski
December/January 2018	Emilia Clarke	Mariano Vivanco

=== 2018 ===
Issue	Cover model	Photographer
February	Kendall Jenner	Sølve Sundsbø
March	Selena Gomez	Alexi Lubomirski
April	Jennifer Lopez	Mariano Vivanco
May	Gigi Hadid	Mariano Vivanco
June/July	Bella Hadid	Sølve Sundsbø
August	Taylor Swift	Alexi Lubomirski
September	Bruce; Jessica Springsteen	Mario Sorrenti
October	Zoë Kravitz	Camilla Åkrans
November	Julia Roberts	Alexi Lubomirski
December/January 2019	Margot Robbie	Camilla Åkrans

=== 2019 ===
Issue	Cover model	Photographer
February	Jennifer Lopez	Camilla Åkrans
March	Cardi B	Mariano Vivanco
April	Alicia Vikander	Mariano Vivanco
May	Rihanna	Dennis Leupold
June/July	Jennifer Aniston	Alexi Lubomirski
August	Serena Williams	Alexi Lubomirski
September	Alicia Keys	Mario Sorrenti
October	Demi Moore	Mariano Vivanco
November	Reese Witherspoon	Camilla Åkrans
December/January 2020	Angelina Jolie	Sølve Sundsbø

== 2020s ==
=== 2020 ===
Issue	Cover model	Photographer
February	Gwyneth Paltrow	Zoey Grossman
March	Kylie Jenner	The Morelli Brothers, Sølve Sundsbø
April	Gigi Hadid	Sølve Sundsbø
May	Demi Lovato	Alexi Lubomirski
Summer	Christy Turlington	Mario Sorrenti
Summer	Ashley Graham	Mario Sorrenti
Summer	Lauren Underwood	Mario Sorrenti
Summer	Allyson Felix	Mario Sorrenti
Summer	Melissa DeRosa	Mario Sorrenti
Summer	Leana Wen	Mario Sorrenti
September	Rihanna	Gray Sorrenti
October	Sarah Paulson	Sam Taylor-Johnson
November	Liya Kebede	Christopher Anderson
December/January 2021	Vanessa Kirby	Scott Trindle

=== 2021 ===
Issue	Cover model	Photographer
February	Awkwafina	Ryan McGinley
March	Megan Thee Stallion	Collier Schorr
April	Jane Fonda	Mario Sorrenti
May	Adwoa Aboah	Liz Johnson Artur
May	Hailey Bieber	Amy Troost
May	Precious Lee	Renell Medrano
May	Rianne Van Rompaey	Cass Bird
May	Liu Wen	Leslie Zhang
June/July	Megan Rapinoe	Ryan McGinley
August	Gigi Hadid	Collier Schorr
September	Beyoncé	Campbell Addy
October	Nicole Kidman	Collier Schorr
November	Tracee Ellis Ross	Renell Medrano
December/January 2022	Hunter Schafer	John Edmonds

=== 2022 ===
Issue	Cover model	Photographer
February	Alana Haim	Josh Olins
March	Venus Williams; Serena Williams	Renell Medrano
April	Renée Zellweger	Mel Bles
May	Lauren Hutton	Cass Bird
May	Jill Kortleve	Josh Olins
May	Imaan Hammam	Renell Medrano
May	Sora Choi	Amy Troost
June/July	Jill Biden	Cass Bird
August	Tessa Thompson	Collier Schorr
September	Hailey Bieber	John Edmonds
September	Bad Bunny	John Edmonds
September	Amanda Gorman	John Edmonds
September	Florence Pugh	John Edmonds
October	Charlize Theron	Josh Olins
November	Emily Ratajkowski	Amy Troost
December/January 2023	Patti Smith	Pieter Hugo

=== 2023 ===
Issue	Cover model	Photographer
February	Taylor Russell	Amy Troost
March	Paris Hilton	Max Farago
March	Kai Newman	Philip-Daniel Ducasse
April	Brie Larson	Collier Schorr
May	Akon Changkou	Lucie Rox
May	Irina Shayk	Bryan Linston
May	Devyn Garcia	Daniel Jackson
May	Julia Nobis	Amy Troost
June/July	Anitta	Emmanuel Sanchez Monsalve
August	Reese Witherspoon	Cass Bird
September	Kendall Jenner	Mario Sorrenti
September	Doja Cat	Mario Sorrenti
September	Paul Mescal	Mario Sorrenti
October	Margaret Qualley	Amy Troost
November	Leanne de Haan	Amy Troost
December/January 2024	Lana Del Rey	Collier Schorr

=== 2024 ===
Issue	Cover model	Photographer
February	Gisele Bündchen	Luis Alberto Rodriguez
March	Solange	Larissa Hofmann
April	Regina King	Luis Alberto Rodriguez
May	Anok Yai	Ethan James Green
May	Christy Turlington	Ethan James Green
June/July	Emma Corrin	Sam Rock
August	Winona Ryder	Liv Liberg
September	Naomi Campbell	Malick Bodian
October	Jennie	Zoë Ghertner
November	Kendrick Lamar	Quentin De Briey
December/January 2025	Miley Cyrus	Ethan James Green

=== 2025 ===
Issue	Cover model	Photographer
February	Zoe Saldaña	Larissa Hofman
March	Rihanna	Luis Alberto Rodriguez
April	Alex Consani, Anok Yai, Paloma Elsesser	Ethan James Green
May	Linda Evangelista	Anthony Seklaoui
Summer	Jenna Ortega	Willy Vanderperre
September	Dua Lipa	Anthony Seklaoui
October	Mona Tougaard	Luis Alberto Rodriguez
November	Cynthia Erivo	Cass Bird
December/January 2026	Meghan, Duchess of Sussex	Malick Bodian

=== 2026 ===
Issue	Cover model	Photographer
February	Kaia Gerber	Luis Alberto Rodriguez
March	Michaela Coel	Willy Vanderperre
April	Anne Hathaway	Inez & Vinoodh
May	Chloë Sevigny	Chaumont Zaerpour
Summer	Alex Consani	Jonathan Frantini
September	Celine Dion	Robin Galiegue
October	Julianne Moore	Senta Simond
November	Natalie Portman	Carlijn Jacobs

== See also ==
- List of L'Officiel USA cover models
- List of Vogue cover models
- List of W cover models
