= Jean Patchett =

American fashion model (1926–2002)

- Born: Jean Ward Patchett; February 16, 1926; Preston, Maryland, U.S.
- Died: January 22, 2002 (aged 75); La Quinta, California, U.S.
- Years active: 1948–1963
- Spouse: Louis Auer (m. 1951)
- Children: 2
- Modeling information
- Hair color: Blonde
- Eye color: Dark green/brown
- Agency: Ford Models
- Website: https://jeanpatchett.com

Jean Ward Patchett Auer (February 16, 1926 – January 22, 2002) was a leading American fashion model of the late 1940s, 1950s, and early 1960s. She was among the best known models of that era, which included Dovima, Dorian Leigh, Suzy Parker, Evelyn Tripp and Lisa Fonssagrives. Patchett was the subject of two of Vogue Magazine's most famous covers, both shot in 1950 by Erwin Blumenfeld and Irving Penn. She was famous for being one of the first high-fashion models to appear remote; previously, models had appeared warm and friendly. Irving Penn described her as "a young American goddess in Paris couture".

During her career, she appeared on over 40 magazine covers. Patchett modeled for brands including Bergdorf Goodman, Henri Bendel and Revlon.

== Early life ==
Jean Ward Patchett’s date of birth was February 16, 1926, in Preston, Maryland, to James Franklin Patchett (1891–1962), a World War I veteran and plumber, and Mary Ward Patchett (1891–1970), who were both originally from Delaware. She was the youngest of four children; she had two sisters, Dorothy Lee (1917–2006) and Elizabeth "Betty" (1922–1999), and a brother, James Franklin Patchett Jr. (1919–2002). She was of Scottish, Irish, English, and French ancestry. Patchett graduated from Preston High School in 1941. She attended secretarial school, studied voice at Peabody Institute, and attended Goucher College before deciding to become a model.

== Career ==
She came to New York in 1948, and signed with the Ford Model Agency on May 10, 1948. Her career took off almost immediately. She debuted with Vogue in September 1948 at the age of 22.

In October 1949, Patchett was photographed by Penn along with Bridget Bate Tichenor for the famous photograph The Tarot Reader. A print of this photograph is in the permanent collection of the Smithsonian American Art Museum. Patchett was the subject of two of Vogue Magazine's most famous covers, January 1950 by Erwin Blumenfeld and April 1950 by Irving Penn. Cathy Horyn wrote that the January 1950 cover "became shorthand for an entire decade". During her career, she appeared on over 40 magazine covers. Patchett's face was used in the 1957 Fred Astaire-Audrey Hepburn-Kay Thompson film, Funny Face, which spoofed the fashion industry.

== Personal life ==
Shortly after signing to Harry Conover's agency, Patchett began living in a Methodist rooming home for women.

Patchett married Louis Auer, a Yale-educated banker in 1951. After 1962, they adopted two children named Bart and Amy.

== Death ==
Jean Patchett Auer died on January 22, 2002, in La Quinta, California, from emphysema.
