= Peter Coppola =

- Born: New York City
- Occupations: hair stylist and salon owner
- Known for: Creator of the Keratin Complex and Keratin Concept lines

Peter Coppola is a hair stylist, salon owner, and businessman. He has opened 34 salons throughout his career. He is also the owner of Peter Coppola Keratin Concept in Boca Raton, Florida.

== Early life ==
Coppola was born and raised in New York City. He is the son of Italian immigrants and grew up on 116th street in Manhattan. As a child, he wanted to be an architect and played the drums. As a teenager, Coppola worked at the Copacabana nightclub and was exposed to fashion and style by the venue's famous and wealthy clientele.

Coppola became interested in the hair industry during his time spent across the street from his childhood home at a neighborhood salon. He credits the shop owners of his neighborhood salon and his mother as pushing him to attend beauty school.

== Career ==
Coppola graduated from beauty school in the early 1960s. Early in his career, Coppola worked as an assistant to stylist Paul McGregor (who created Jane Fonda’s signature shag cut). Coppola also worked with stylist Vidal Sassoon early in his career and credits Sassoon as a mentor and inspiration. Other stylists he admires include Frédéric Fekkai and John Sahag.

In 1968, Coppola teamed up with stylist Paul Mitchell to open the first American hair cutting salon. A year later, hair-care product maker Clairol approached him to collaborate on product development. Coppola and Clairol worked together on Clairol's Luminize product line. In 1972, Coppola went to the New York Supreme Court on the ban on men's haircuts in beauty salons. In 1996, Coppola received the Cosmair World Class Color Award.

Coppola worked with television shopping network QVC early in the network's existence. He appeared regularly on QVC for five years and developed the Peter Coppola's New York Soyagen Complex product line and a hair volumizing system specifically for QVC audiences. He credits QVC with educating him on product development. Coppola has also worked with the Home Shopping Network.

In June 2013, Coppola introduced his Keratin Concept Hair Therapy Smoothing System product line at the Premiere Show 2013, an industry exposition in Orlando, Florida. Coppola also gave away a 2013 Fiat 500 and hair-care products during the exposition.

== Products ==
Coppola's Keratin Concept Hair Therapy Smoothing System contains keratin protein, ceramides, collagen and other ingredients to "add volume, reduce damage and strengthen hair." Unlike similar products, Keratin Concept does not contain any formaldehyde.

== Personal life ==
Coppola's parents were born in Naples, Italy and immigrated to Manhattan with their brothers and sisters. He has a daughter named Francesca and a son, Peter Jr.
