= Edgar de Evia =

Mexican-born American photographer (1910–2003)

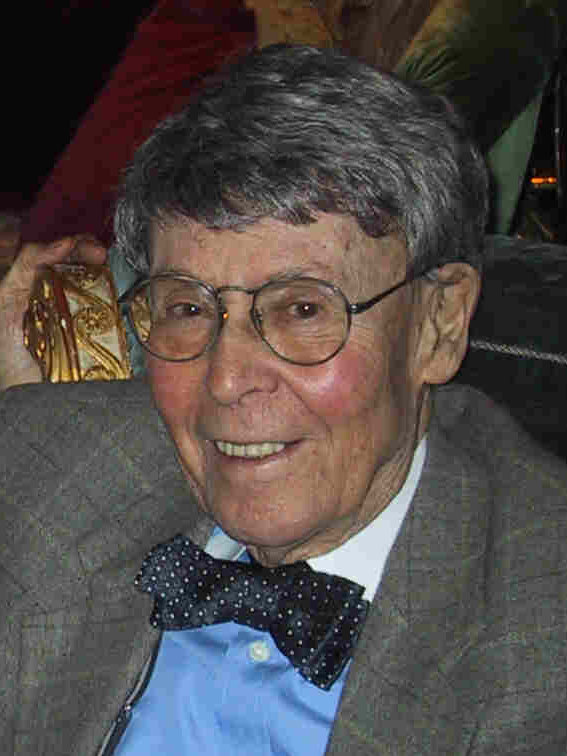
- De Evia circa 2002
- Born: Edgar Domingo Evia y Joutard; July 30, 1910; Mérida, Yucatán, Mexico
- Died: February 10, 2003 (aged 92); New York City, U.S.

Edgar Domingo Evia y Joutard, known professionally as Edgar de Evia (July 30, 1910 – February 10, 2003), was a Mexican-born American interiors photographer.

In a career that spanned the 1940s through the 1990s, his photography appeared in magazines and newspapers such as ' House & Garden, Look and The New York Times Magazine and advertising campaigns for Borden Ice Cream and Jell-O.

== Careers ==
=== Homeopathy research ===
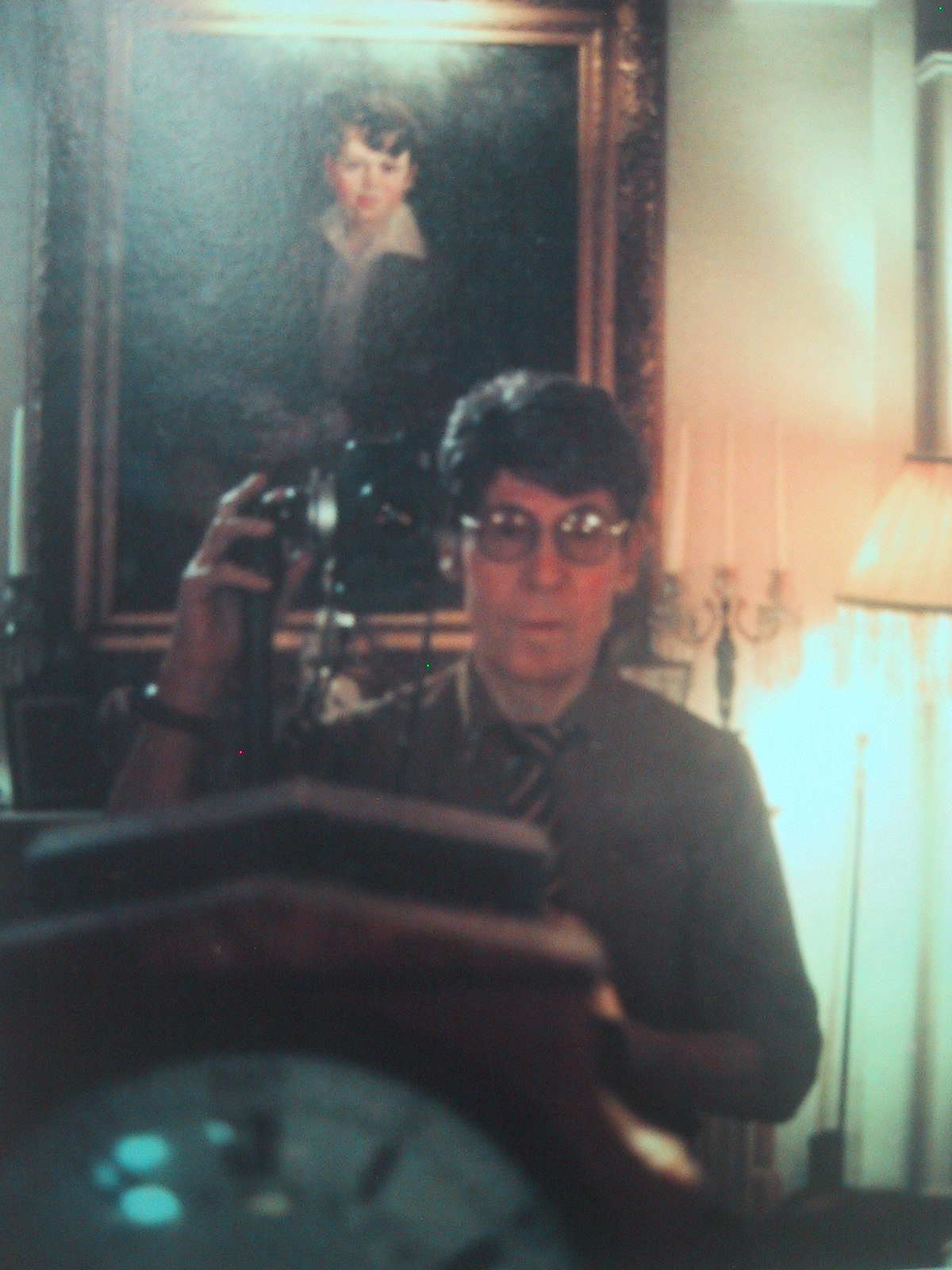
Photographic self-portrait by Edgar de Evia reflected with the oil portrait by M. Jean McLane of himself as a child (circa 1990).

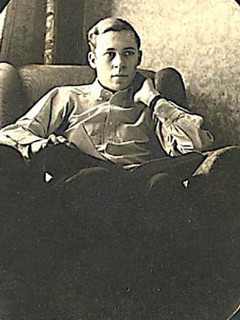
Edgar de Evia, c.1930

Logo designed by Edgar de Evia

In 1942, homeopathic physician Guy Beckley Stearns and de Evia contributed an essay called "The New Synthesis", for the Laurie's Domestic Medicine medical guide.

=== Photography ===
In a review of the book, The New York Times stated that "Black and white [photography] is frequently interspersed through the book and serves as a reminder that black and white still has a useful place, even in a world of color, often more convincingly as well. This is pointed up rather persuasively in the portfolio on Edgar de Evia as a 'master of still life' and in the one devoted to the work of Réne Groebli." "Editorial high-key food photography was introduced by Edgar D'Evia in 1953 for the pages of Good Housekeeping."

Melvin Sokolsky, a fashion photographer who has created images for Harpers Bazaar and Vogue, considered Edgar de Evia one of his earliest influences, saying, "I discovered that Edgar was paid $4,000 for a Jell-O ad, and the idea of escaping from my tenement dwelling became an incredible dream and inspiration."

==== Personalities photographed ====
De Evia also produced commissioned photographic portraits of individuals, including Polish-American violinist Roman Totenberg and the American fashion designer Ralph Lauren.

==== Editorial photography ====
De Evia's work appeared on Applied Photography, Architectural Digest, Good Housekeeping, Shaggy Lamb Fashion, and New York Magazine.

==== Books ====
Books that have been illustrated with de Evia's photography include:

- The American Annual of Photography, New York: American Photography Book Department, 1953.
- Good Housekeeping Book of Home Decoration by Mary L. Brandt, New York: McGraw-Hill, 1957.
- Picture Cookbook by The Editors of Life, Mary Hamman, Editor, New York, NY: Time, Inc., 1958. Second edition 1959, Third edition 1960.
- The Spacemaker Book by Ellen Liman, Nancy Stahl and Lewis Wilson, New York: Viking Press, 1977.
- Fashion: The Inside Story by Barbaralee Diamonstein, New York: Rizzoli, 1985
- House & Garden's Best in Decoration by the Editors of House & Garden, New York: Condé Nast Books, Random House, 1987. De Evia's photos include the front jacket.
- Glamour's On The Run by Jane Kirby, Glamour Food Editor, New York: Condé Nast Books, Villard Books, 1987. De Evia's photos include the front & back jacket.
- Interior Design by John F. Pile, New York: H.N. Abrams, 1988.
- The Tiffany Gourmet Cookbook by John Loring, New York: Doubleday, 1992.
- House Beautiful Decorating Style by Carol Cooper Garey, Hearst Books, 2005. 1992 edition published by Hearst Communications.
- Victoria On Being a Mother by Victoria Magazine Staff, Hearst Books, 2005. (1st. edition and ©1989)
- Culinary Traditions II: A Taste of Waynesboro, Pennsylvania collected by the Waynesboro Historical Society, Morris Press, 2007.

==== Commercial photography ====
De Evia worked for Borden Ice Cream (Lady Borden campaign 1956–1960), Celanese Corporation, Gorham Silver, hats by Mr. John of John-Frederics, Leather Industries of America, Maximilian Furs (1950s, all ads had the credit "DeEvia"), McCall's patterns (all ads had the credit "Photograph by Edgar de Evia").

==== Gallery ====
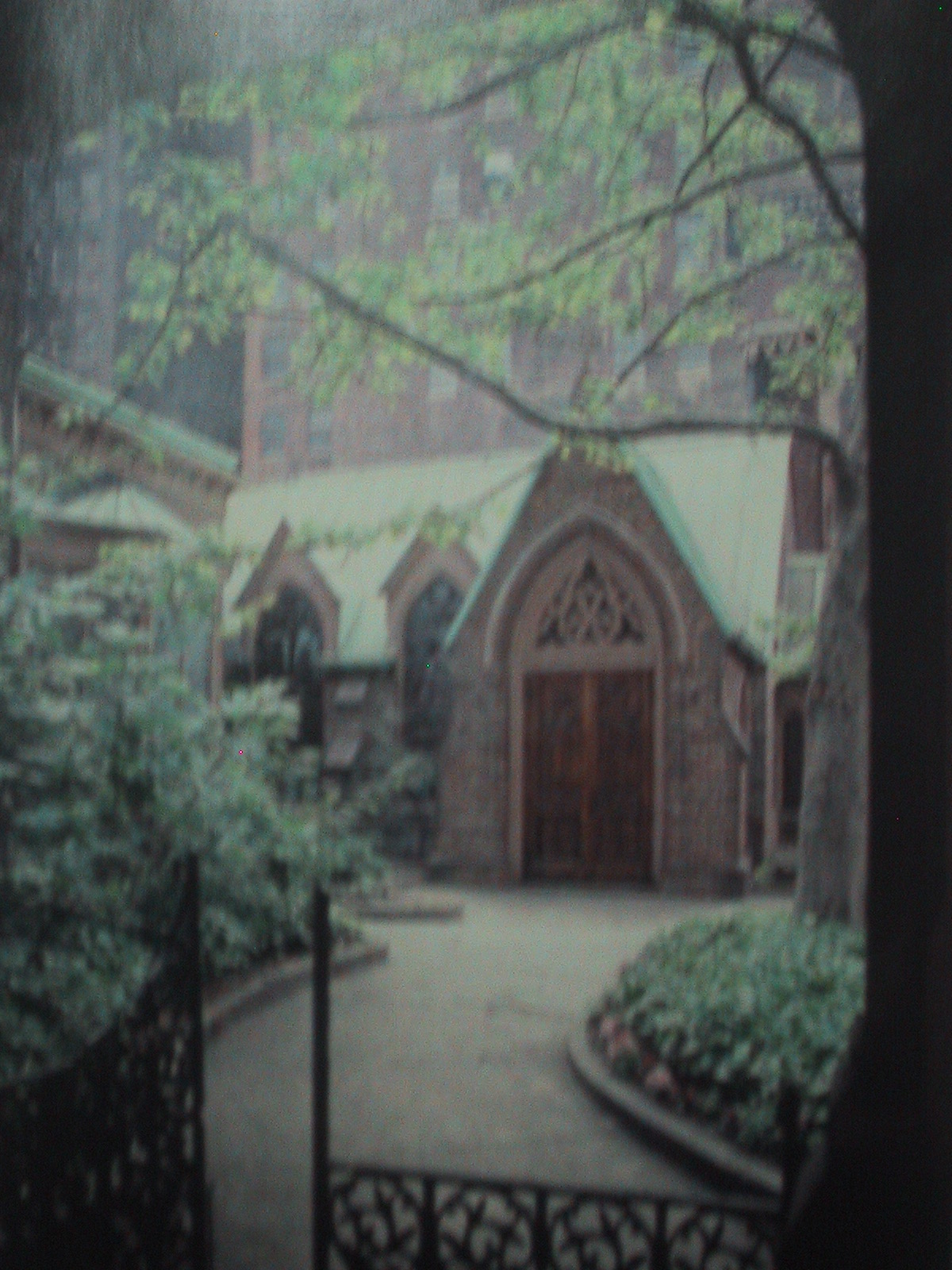
The Little Church Around the Corner (The Episcopal Church of the Transfiguration, NYC)

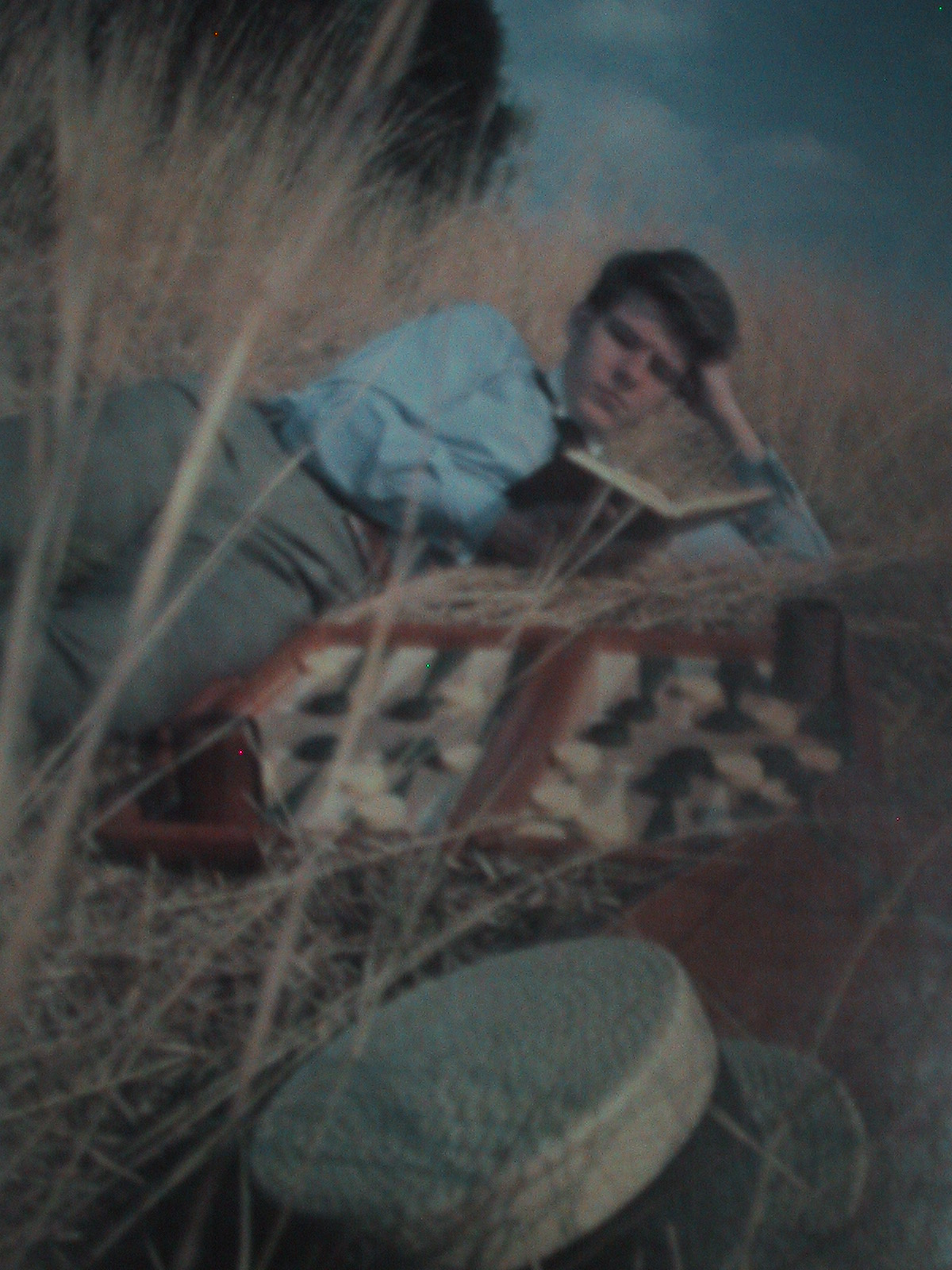
A model reads a book in a 1968 de Evia portfolio photograph.

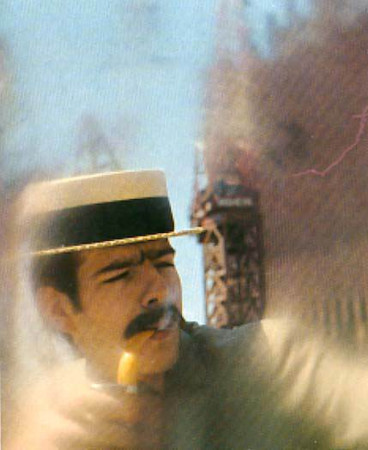
1969, a man with a hat in front of the World Trade Center under construction

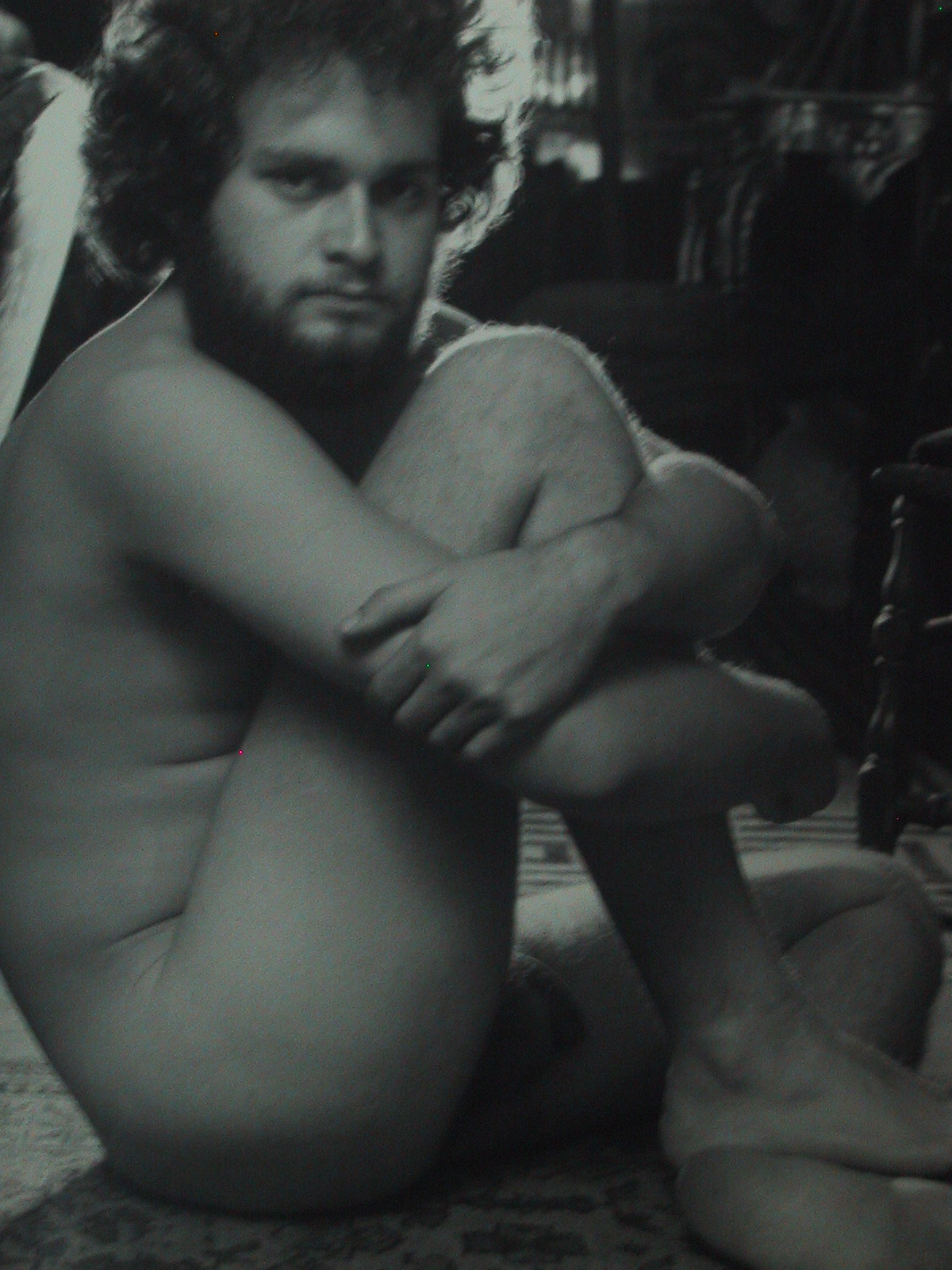
A male nude, taken in the 1970s.

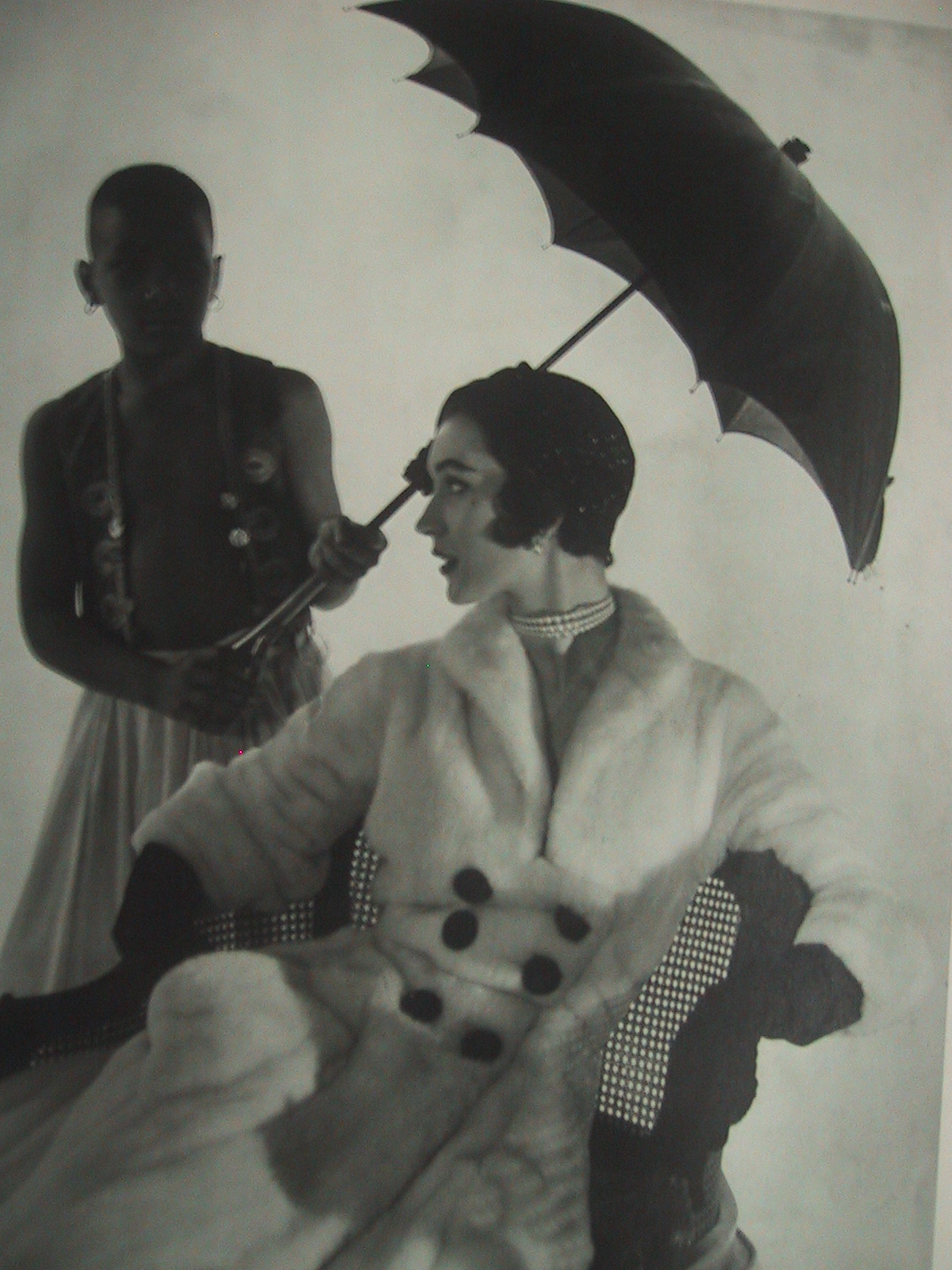
Professional model Dovima, in a 1950s ad.

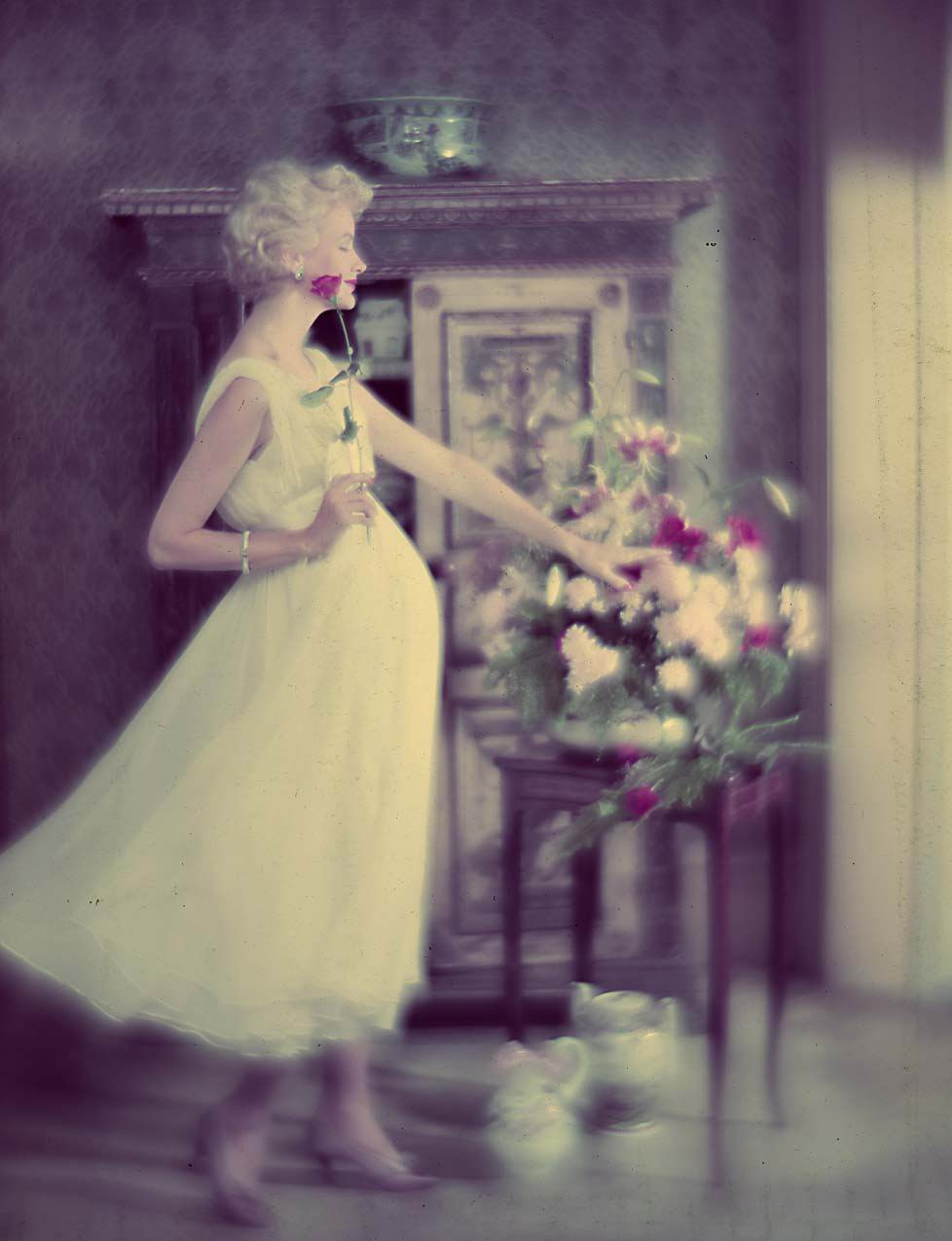
Professional model Sunny Harnett taken in the 1950s.

== Relationships ==
In the 1950s, de Evia's companion and business partner was Robert Denning, who worked in his studio and who would become a leading American interior designer and partner in the firm Denning & Fourcade.
