= Simone D'Aillencourt =

French model (1930–2017)

- Born: Simone Elise Marie Daillencourt; September 22, 1930; Vizille, France
- Died: July 23, 2017 (aged 86); Paris, France
- Other names: Simone Bénazéraf
- Years active: 1954–1969
- Spouse: José Bénazéraf (m. 1961; died 2012)
- Children: 2

Simone D'Aillencourt or d'Aillencourt (née Daillencourt, 22 September 1930 – 23 July 2017) was a French model and talent agent. Her career in modeling, during which she achieved significant success, took place from the mid-1950s to the late 1960s. She is best known as the subject of Melvin Sokolsky's "Bubble" photographic series taken in Paris for Harper's Bazaar in 1963. She had two daughters during her marriage to José Bénazéraf.

== Biography ==
Simone D'Aillencourt was born on 22 September 1930 in Vizille, the daughter of Leon and Anna Daillencourt.

Her activities in the modeling profession began in England. D'Aillencourt began her successful career in Edinburgh in 1954 after a visit by Lucie Clayton. She posed for the British magazine Vogue and then went back and forth between Britain and France. She worked regularly for Pierre Cardin, sometimes for Jacques Heim, and posed for various magazines such as Elle, L'Officiel, Vogue Paris or also Le Jardin des Modes. Due to her job, she traveled many times, posing for William Klein for whom she would become one of his favourites, Irving Penn, John French, Richard Avedon, or also French photographer Georges Dambier or Jeanloup Sieff, who "often photographed" according to him. Independent while the agencies are then little developed, she was contacted by Eileen Ford and invited to New York. She then met the influential Diana Vreeland, which further propelled her career.

In early 1963, D'Aillencourt was selected by Melvin Sokolsky for his "Bubble" series for Harper's Bazaar. She had her test shot in colour taken in New York, which the staff of Harper's Bazaar approved. She flew to Paris on 20 January 1963 to have her photos taken by Sokolsky. During the shoot, the Bubble that D'Aillencourt was in was lowered too far into the Seine, which damaged the designer shoes that she was wearing.

D'Aillencourt made her final series of photographs in India, with photographer Henry Clarke, in 1969 after a successful career of 15 years. Throughout her career, she always kept with the trends over time, from the sophistication of the 1950s to the greatest freedom of clothing the following decade. Some time after she stopped modeling, she founded a modeling agency in Paris, Model International, which quickly grew, and then a second agency of a more modest size, Image. She was married to José Bénazéraf, their second daughter Béatrice also having integrated modeling as a booker. In 2008, D'Aillencourt attended the festival at Hyères to celebrate the exhibitions of Sokolsky's work. She died in the 15th arrondissement of Paris on 23 July 2017.
