= James Hamilton (photographer) =

American photographer

James Hamilton (born 1946) is an American photographer, best known for his documentation of the New York City film, art and music scene of the 1970s and 1980s.

== Life ==
James Hamilton was born in Baltimore. His career began as a painting student at Pratt Institute, in Brooklyn, NY, where he studied from fall, 1964 to summer, 1966. He swiftly changed gears after securing a summer job at the studio of fashion photographer Alberto Rizzo. It was while employed there that Hamilton learned to use a darkroom and purchased his first camera, a Nikon Rangefinder, which he traded with Rizzo for a Nikon F. His passion for photography was ignited by shooting in the street, as opposed to the confines of the studio. By summer’s end James had decided not to finish his last two years at the school, but to instead remain at the studio with Rizzo.

In 1969 Hamilton began hitch-hiking around the US, spending five months on the road capturing images wherever he landed. While traveling through Texas, the young photographer found out about a music festival taking place in a nearby town. He created fake press passes and spent three days shooting musicians as they performed at the Texas International Pop Festival. Upon his return to New York City he built a darkroom in his apartment, processed the film, and began printing. He took the images from the festival to the newly launched music magazine, Crawdaddy! and was hired on the spot as their staff photographer. It was then that Hamilton began to capture the steady stream of bands that came through the city, spending weekends shooting at the Fillmore East and, according to James, "...covering the music life of NYC." He continues, "I never set out to photograph celebrities, and never really thought of myself as a 'portrait photographer'... I had always carried my camera wherever I went, using it to create a sort of personal history and a way of finding adventure." Thus began a decades long career that would find Hamilton photographing the NYC music scene during some of its most fervent and fertile years, capturing the likes of Nico, Patti Smith, Tom Verlaine, Beastie Boys, and James Brown.

Hamilton served as staff photographer for numerous publications, including Crawdaddy! (1969-1971), The Herald (1971), Harper’s Bazaar (1971-1975), the Village Voice (1974-1993), and the New York Observer (1993-2009) while contributing to many iconic magazines including Rolling Stone, Vanity Fair and New York.

== War photography ==
During the late 1970s and throughout the 1980s, Hamilton photographed war and civil unrest in areas including El Salvador, Honduras, Nicaragua, Guatemala, Haiti and Grenada. He was situated in the Philippines during the overthrow of Ferdinand Marcos, and in Beijing during the Tiananmen Square massacre (sneaking photos past authorities that became some of the few to appear in US newspapers).

== Film photography ==
In 1980, Hamilton began also shooting stills for films. After meeting George A. Romero, Hamilton was enlisted to capture stills for his next two movies, Knightriders and Creepshow, following with work for Francis Ford Coppola on the set of The Outsiders. He went on to shoot extensively with Wes Anderson, photographing the sets of The Royal Tenenbaums, The Life Aquatic with Steve Zissou, and The Darjeeling Limited, as well as on the set of Noah Baumbach’s The Squid and the Whale.

== Books ==
In 1977 Pinball! was published by E. P. Dutton in New York. Hamilton shot the photographs and Roger C. Sharpe authored the text. The book provides a detailed chronicle of pinball's rise and becoming of a national pastime, starting with its pre-war roots and tracing its history up to its ubiquity in now long-extinct bars, penny arcades, and coffee houses across the US and in Europe. Hamilton's color photographs of the machines themselves, as well as the places in which they lived and the people who played them, provides viewers with a time capsule of the pinball-crazed era of the mid-seventies.

In 2010, Hamilton published the monograph You Should Have Heard Just What I Seen with Ecstatic Peace Library (a division of Daydream Library), New York. The book revealed his vast archive of previously unpublished photography spanning four decades of the music scene. Containing over 300 black and white photographs, the book includes portrait sittings, performance shots, and reportage. The musicians pictured represent a wide variety of genres such as Duane Allman, Dolly Parton, Madonna, Eubie Blake, Charles Mingus, Joni Mitchell, Bing Crosby, Jerry Lee Lewis, Glenn Branca, The Ramones, Gil Scott-Heron, Laurie Anderson and Bob Marley. Also included are portraits of music critics like Robert Christgau, Legs McNeil and Nat Hentoff. Hamilton produced You Should Have Heard Just What I Seen in collaboration with Thurston Moore, whom he had photographed previously with Sonic Youth and served as the book's editor. The foreword is by Mark Jacobson. You Should Have Heard Just What I Seen received press from Vanity Fair, New Yorker and Another Magazine.
