= José Bénazéraf =

French filmmaker and producer (1922-2012)

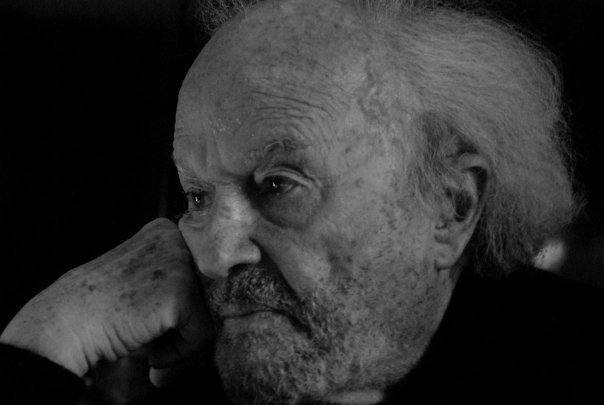
- José Bénazéraf
- Born: 8 January 1922; Casablanca, French Morocco
- Died: 1 December 2012 (aged 90); Chiclana de la Frontera, Spain
- Occupation: Director
- Years active: 1958 – 1999
- Notable work: Frustration, Trip to Perversion, I am a Nymphomaniac
- Spouse: Simone D'Aillencourt (m. 1961; died 2012)
- Children: 2

José Bénazéraf (8 January 1922 – 1 December 2012) was a French filmmaker and producer who specialised in erotic films.

== Life and career ==
Bénazéraf was born in Casablanca, French Morocco on 8 January 1922. After completing his studies in political sciences, he started his film career in 1958 producing Les lavandières du Portugal, a film by Pierre Gaspard-Huit, and went on to direct and write numerous erotic films in the 1960s. He started to direct erotic feature films in 1961 with L'éternité pour nous.

At the end of the 1970s, he moved his attention to the direct-to-video market.

He died in Chiclana de la Frontera.

== Views on filmmaking ==
In 1973, Bénazéraf stated he did not make message films, and that one of the reasons he made films was to "disturb the French" (French: "déranger les Français"), who were, he felt, not disturbed by anything, neither politically nor sexually.

Bénazéraf also said that he attempted "to poeticise eroticism" (French: poétiser l'érotisme), whereas many at that time tended to accentuate pornography. He found pornographic films "horribly sad" (French: "horriblement triste") and called them "anti-eroticism" (French: "anti-érotisme"). According to Bénazéraf, eroticism was something "which creates a climate, which creates, which awakes, which sublimates desire" (French: "qui crée un climat, qui crée, qui suscite, qui sublimise le désir"), and the effect of pornography was the opposite.

== Filmography ==
As director

- 1960 : Mourir d'amour (Ma mort a les yeux bleus)
- 1961 : Le Quatrième Sexe (not credited)
- 1961 : L'Éternité pour nous (Le Cri de la chair)
- 1962 : Le Concerto de la peur (La Drogue du vice) (U.S. title Night of Lust)
- 1963 : Paris erotika (24 heures d'un Américain à Paris)
- 1964 : Cover Girls
- 1964 : L'Enfer dans la peau (La Nuit la plus longue)
- 1965 : L'Enfer sur la plage
- 1967 : Un épais manteau de sang
- 1967 : St. Pauli Between Night and Morning (Plaisirs pervers)
- 1968 : Joë Caligula - Du suif chez les dabes (Joe Caligula)
- 1969 : Le Désirable et le Sublime
- 1971 : Frustration (Les Dérèglements d'une jeune provinciale)
- 1973 : Bacchanales 73
- 1973 : The French Love
- 1973 : Le Sexe nu (Un homme se penche sur son destin)
- 1974 : Le Bordel, 1ère époque : 1900
- 1974 : L'Homme qui voulait violer le monde (Black Love)
- 1974 : Adolescence pervertie
- 1975 : La Soubrette perverse (La Soubrette)
- 1975 : La Veuve lubrique (La Veuve)
- 1975 : Les Deux gouines (Les Gouines) (Victoire et Isabelle)
- 1975 : Séquences interdites
- 1975 : Les Incestueuses
- 1976 : La Planque 1 (Sex Porno)
- 1976 : La Planque 2
- 1976 : Une garce en chaleur
- 1977 : Un dîner très spécial
- 1977 : La Bonne auberge (Ici, on baise)
- 1977 : Miss Aubépine (Vices cachés de Miss Aubépine)
- 1978 : Bordel SS
- 1978 : Ouvre-toi
- 1978 : Grimpe-moi dessus et fais-moi mal
- 1978 : Baisez-moi partout (Attention, je vais jouir)
- 1979 : Nicole par dessus, par dessous
- 1979 : Anna cuisses entrouvertes
- 1979 : Je te suce, tu me suces, il nous...
- 1980 : Hurlements d'extase
- 1980 : Amours d'adolescentes pubères
- 1981 : Brantôme 81 : Vie de dames galantes
- 1982 : Patricia, Valéria, Anna et les autres
- 1983 : Eva la grande suceuse
- 1983 : Chattes chaudes sur queues brûlantes
- 1983 : La Madone des pipes
- 1983 : La star sodomisée (The Movie Star)
- 1983 : Le Majordome est bien monté
- 1983 : Rita la vicieuse
- 1983 : L'Espionne s'envoie en l'air
- 1983 : Le Viol à bicyclette
- 1983 : Je mouille aussi par derrière
- 1983 : Je te suce, tu me suces ou la vie d'un bordel de province
- 1984 : Du foutre plein le cul
- 1984 : Petits culs à enfiler
- 1984 : Les Sexologues en chaleur
- 1984 : Le Port aux putes
- 1984 : L'Antiquaire a la chatte mouillée
- 1984 : Ingrid, Whore of Hamburg
- 1985 : Perverse Isabelle (La Fête à Isabelle)
- 1985 : Le Yacht des partouzes
- 1985 : L'Éveil porno d'une star
- 1985 : Le Cul des mille plaisirs
- 1985 : Lady Winter, perversités à l'anglaise
- 1985 : Olynka, grande prêtresse de l'amour
- 1985 : Bourgeoises à soldats, soumises et défoncées
- 1985 : Les Confidences pornographiques de lady Winter
- 1985 : Voyage au bout du vice
- 1985 : Spanish Fly
- 1986 : Les Obsessions sexuelles de lady Winter
- 1986 : Triple pénétration
- 1986 : Sex Resort
- 1986 : Passionate Pupils
- 1986 : Naughty French Fantasies
- 1986 : Hot Patutti
- 1986 : Fantasies of a Married Woman
- 1986 : Bedside Manor
- 1990 : Backdoor to Paris
- 1997 : Contes de la Folie Ordinaire
- 1999 : Portrait Regards de Zarah Whites

As actor

- 1960 : À bout de souffle (not credited)
- 1971 : Frustration ou les Dérèglements d'une jeune provinciale

== Bibliography ==
- (Anonymous) (1973). "Bénazéraf nous parle". Pan (in French) (8): 72–78.
- Lentz, Harris M. III (2013). Obituaries in the Performing Arts, 2012. McFarland. p. 26. ISBN 9780786470631.
