= Louise Vyent =

Dutch lifestyle coach

- Born: Louise Vyent
- Occupations: Lifestyle Coach; Model (formerly)
- Website: https://louisevyent.com/

Louise Vyent is a Dutch lifestyle coach, New Age spiritualist, and Reiki practitioner. In the 1990s, she was an international fashion model, and collaborated with photographers Richard Avedon, Irving Penn, and Arthur Elgort. According to New Woman, Louise was one of the most "sought after models of the 1990s", and appeared in the fashion magazines Vogue, Vogue Italia, Harper's Bazaar, Glamour Magazine.

== Career ==
Vyent appeared in the 1990 Sports Illustrated Swimsuit Issue and the Victoria's Secret catalog. She worked for Revlon and appeared on various covers for both national and international editions of Glamour, Vogue, and Harper's Bazaar.

== Personal life ==
Currently, Vyent is based in New Jersey. She has two children, Uma and Max.
