= Shaun Casey =

American model (1954–2024)

Shaun Casey (January 7, 1954 – June 27, 2024) was an American model active from the mid-1970s through the mid-1980s. By 1987 she had given up modeling for all but a few favorite clients.

== Life and career ==
In the late 1970s, Casey was associated with hairstylist John Sahag, who cut her hair extremely short and bleached it white for a Helmut Newton cover of Vogue Paris.

Casey described modeling as "a grind, it's just like any other job" and said of her pictures, "Gosh, I wish I looked like that every day."

From 1978 to 1983 Casey was married to actor Roger Wilson. She died from cancer on June 27, 2024, at the age of 70.
