= Marcel Vertès =

French costume designer

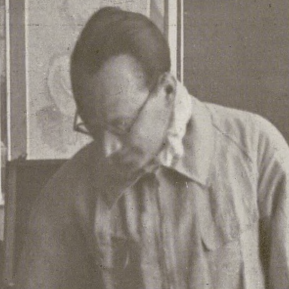
- Born: Marcell Vértes; 10 August 1895; Budapest, Hungary
- Died: 31 October 1961 (aged 66); Paris, France
- Other names: Marcell Vértes, Marcel Vertes
- Occupation: Costume designer
- Years active: 1933–1952

Marcel Vertès (born Marcell Vértes, 10 August 1895 – 31 October 1961) was a French costume designer and illustrator of Hungarian-Jewish origins. He won two Academy Awards (Best Art Direction and Best Costume Design) for his work on the 1952 film Moulin Rouge.

In the late 1930s, he collaborated with Elsa Schiaparelli on the design of perfume bottles.

Vertès is also responsible for the original murals in the Café Carlyle in the Carlyle Hotel in New York City, New York and for those in the Peacock Alley in the Waldorf Astoria Hotel in New York.

== Selected filmography ==
- Moulin Rouge (1952)
