= Marco Glaviano =

Italian photographer and architect (born 1942)

- Born: Marco Glaviano; 1942 (age 83–84); Palermo, Sicily, Italy
- Education: University of Palermo
- Known for: Fashion photographer

Marco Glaviano (born 1942) is an Italian photographer and architect, who has worked for fashion magazines and brands on both sides of the Atlantic, and with many of the world's best-known models. He has been a pioneer of digital photography, being the first to publish a digital picture in American Vogue in 1982. His photographs of fashion, celebrities, landscapes, and jazz have appeared in numerous museums and are in private and public collections worldwide. He is the co-founder of Pier 59 Studios in New York City, which he also helped design.

== Early life ==
Marco Glaviano was born in Palermo, Sicily, in 1942, to Nicola and Ninni Glaviano. His uncle was the influential Italian futurist artist, Gino Severini, and Glaviano was interested in art from a young age. He graduated from the University of Palermo with a degree in architecture in 1964.

== Career ==
Soon after his graduation from the University of Palermo, Marco Glaviano started experimenting with photography. He also worked as a set designer and played in a jazz group. In 1967, in pursuit of a career in photography, he moved to Rome, and then to Milan. Soon he was working full-time as a fashion photographer for leading Italian magazines.

Marco Glaviano moved to New York City in 1975, where he started to work under an exclusive contract for American Vogue, and then later for Harper’s Bazaar. His works also appeared frequently in other American and European magazines such as Elle and Italian Vanity Fair. He has photographed over 500 covers and editorials for these publications.

In the 1980s and 1990s, Glaviano collaborated with Elite Model Management and worked extensively with prominent models such as Paulina Porizkova, Iman, Joan Severance, Anneliese Seubert, Yasmeen Ghauri, Tatiana Sorokko, Eva Herzigova, and Cindy Crawford. He photographed the International Disco Dance Artist, Lourett Russell Grant. He also photographed many of the greats of jazz, including B. B. King, Jon Faddis, Red Norvo, Dizzy Gillespie and Tony Scott, to name a few. He designed and later managed the 70,000 square foot Pier 59 Studios, part of the Chelsea Piers on the West Side Highway. The four-story structure houses 10 studios, an open-air deck overlooking the Hudson and a growing digital photography division. Glaviano designed the Milano Studio Digital in Milan in 2001. His strong interest in digital photography led him to publish the first-ever digital picture in American Vogue in 1982.

Glaviano has shot advertising campaigns for clients such as L'Oréal, Revlon, Calvin Klein, Valentino, Giorgio Armani, and Roberto Cavalli, among others. His interests in film and video have led him to direct a number of TV commercials and short versions of music, fashion and beauty films for both Europe and the U.S.

Glaviano has published fourteen books and has had many solo exhibitions all over the globe, including shows in New York, Saint Barts, Los Angeles, San Francisco, Milan, Palermo, and Capri, among others. In 2010, he was honored with a retrospective exhibition of 130 photographs at the Palazzo Morando Museum in Milan. According to the Italian Vogue, the exhibition "was a huge success, with such a numerous participation that the admission of the invited public in the rooms of the ground floor of Palazzo Morando in via Sant'Andrea had to be staggered." According to the Miami Herald, the December 2012 Art Basel Miami Art Fair included a "debut [of] Jazz & Models, a collection of works by legendary photographer Marco Glaviano, who, in his two decades, has snapped shots of Cindy Crawford, Paulina Porizkova, Stephanie Seymour and, on the jazzy side, Chet Baker, Sonny Rollins and Dizzy Gillsepie, among others."

His photographs are highly collectable and hang in some of the world’s leading museums and private collections. For the 40th anniversary of his career, a special limited edition collector's book was published and displayed at the Space SBH Contemporary Art Gallery in Gustavia, St. Barts. The book contains a selection of photographs taken throughout Glaviano’s career and includes a fine pigment giclee print.

== Bibliography ==
- Glaviano, Marco. Models: Sittings 1978-1988. Day Dream Publishing, 1988. ISBN 978-1558240681
- Glaviano, Marco. Sirens. Calloway, 1997. ISBN 978-3283003432
- Glaviano, Marco. Elles. Editions Treville, 1999. ISBN 978-4845707010
- Glaviano, Marco. Sirens of Costa Smeralda. Leonardo International, 2005. ISBN 978-8888828503
- Sewell, Dennita. Extending the Runway: Tatiana Sorokko Style. Moscow: Russian Fashion Museum, 2010. ISBN 978-0-615-34760-8
