= Bill King (photographer) =

American fashion photographer

William King (1939–1987) was an American fashion photographer known for the energy and sophistication he brought to his photographs.

According to his ex-boyfriend, hairdresser Harry King, "He was kind, sweet, lovely, and a great photographer, but Bill did too many drugs and got off on people's misfortunes."

He died of AIDS at the Beth Israel Hospital in New York in 1987.
