= Kim Alexis =

American model and actress

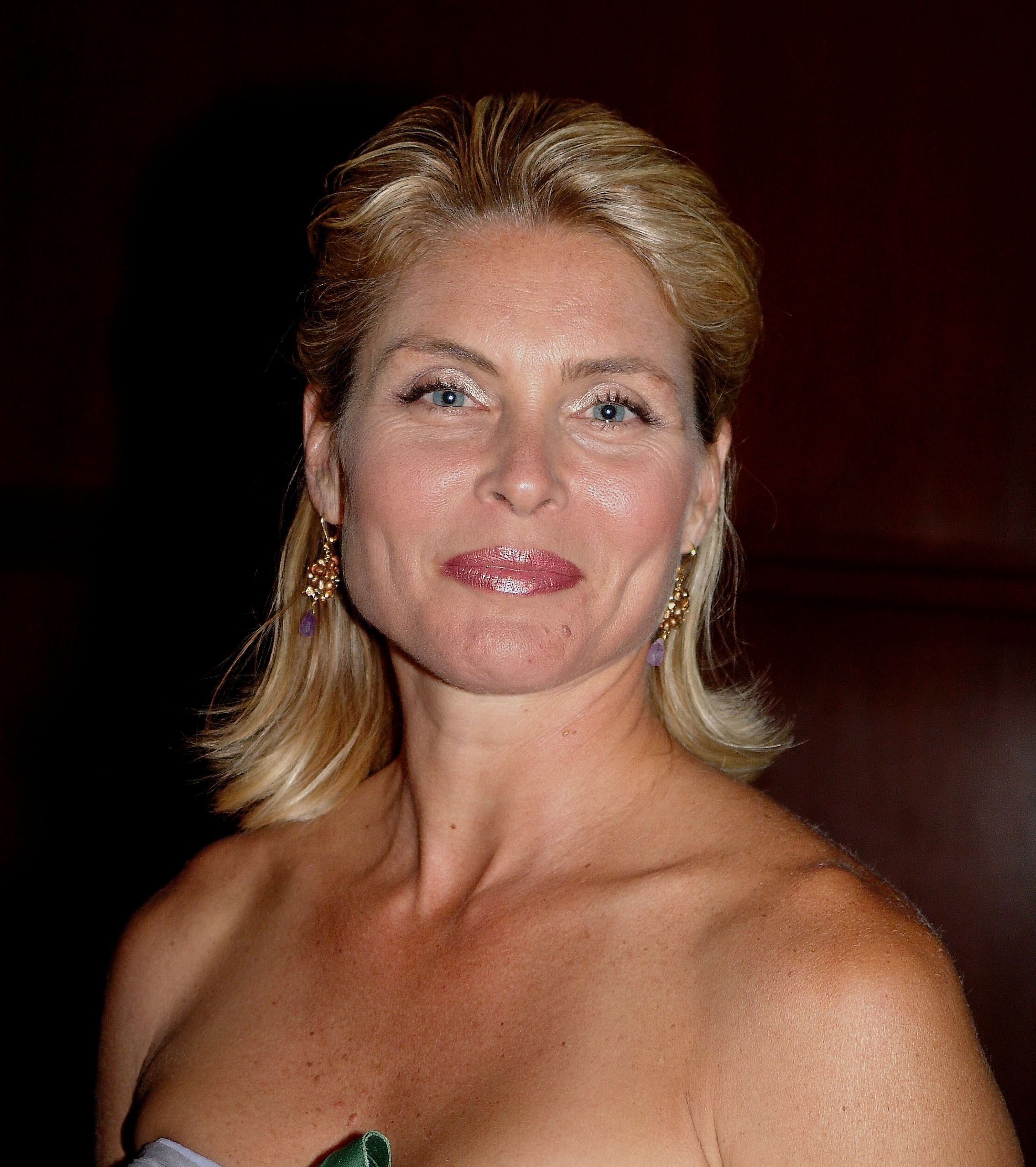
- Alexis in 2003
- Born: July 16, 1960 (age 65); Lockport, New York, U.S.
- Occupations: Actress, model
- Years active: 1978–present
- Height: 1.79 m (5 ft 10 in)
- Spouses: Jim Stockton (m. 1983; div. 1992) Ron Duguay (m. 1993; div. 2016) Jeff Schwartz (m. 2018)
- Children: 3
- Website: kimalexis.com

Kim Alexis (born July 16, 1960) is an American model and actress who was famous in the 1970s and 1980s. She appeared on the cover of magazines like Sports Illustrated, Vogue, Harper's Bazaar, Glamour, Self and Cosmopolitan.

== Early life ==
Alexis was born in Lockport, New York, and grew up in the suburbs of Buffalo. Her father, Robert, was a chemical engineer. Her mother's name is Barbara. She also has a younger sister, Rhonda. She started to be a swimmer at the age of six and began to swim competitively through her senior year at Lockport High School. She attended college at the University of Rhode Island, and was accepted into a five-year pharmacy program.

Alexis was raised Presbyterian, and she and her family attended church every Sunday.

== Modeling ==
Alexis was one of the top models of the late 1970s and early to mid 1980s, identified along with Gia Carangi, Patti Hansen, Christie Brinkley, Kelly Emberg, Iman, Janice Dickinson, and Paulina Porizkova. In 1983 she became the face of Revlon's premium Ultima II line, replacing Lauren Hutton.

== Television ==
In the early 1990s, Alexis hosted health shows, such as Healthy Kids on the Family Channel and Lifetime.

In the late 1990s, she was host of Daily Edition, a syndicated program distributed by MGM.

She also appeared with Mike Ditka in the last episode of Cheers, "One for the Road" in 1993.

In 2005, she appeared on VH1's reality competition But Can They Sing?, where celebrities, who have never sung before, get the chance to perform in front of an audience. Alexis was eliminated in week two.

== Film ==
Alexis appeared in the 1993 movie Body Bags, and the 1998 movie Holy Man with Eddie Murphy.

== Advertising ==
In 1995, Alexis became the spokeswoman for Alpine Lace Brands, Inc., promoting the company's Alpine Lace low-fat cheese products.

== Personal life ==
Alexis is divorced from former NHL hockey player Ron Duguay, with whom she has a son, Noah (born 1994). She also has two sons, Jamie and Bobby, with ex-husband Jim Stockton. Alexis raised her family in Ponte Vedra Beach, Florida.

== Filmography ==
Year	Title	Role	Notes
1992	The Commish	Elaine Thomas	
1993	Body Bags	Woman with beautiful hair	
1993	Cheers	Herself	
1993	A Perry Mason Mystery: The Case of the Wicked Wives	Nina Morgan Morrison	
1998	Holy Man	Amber	
1999	Sunset Beach	Hotel Maid	
