= Rico Puhlmann =

German fashion photographer

- Born: Richard Georg Willi Puhlmann; June 25, 1934; Berlin, Germany
- Died: July 17, 1996 (aged 62); Atlantic Ocean off the coast of East Moriches, New York, U.S.
- Occupation: Fashion photographer

Richard Georg Willi Puhlmann (25 June 1934 – 17 July 1996), was a German fashion photographer, who worked with the top models, stylists and designers in the fashion industry. He was killed when TWA Flight 800 came down shortly after takeoff in 1996.

== Early life ==
Puhlmann was born in Berlin in 1934. At the age of seven, he worked as a child actor during the years of World War II and made his acting debut in the 1942 film Front Theatre. In the fall of 1943, going under the name Willi Puhlmann, he was cast in the main role for the film adaptation of the German fairy tale Little Muck, which was set in the 18th-century Holy Roman Empire. The end of the war largely marked the end of Puhlmann's early acting career. He was later only offered two smaller acting roles in two DEFA productions in 1949 and 1954.

== Photography career ==
Puhlmann studied fashion design, art design, and art history at the Berlin University of the Arts (Hochschule für Bildende Künste Berlin) from 1951 to 1955. Puhlmann started his career as a fashion illustrator at a time when "Berliner Chic" reached a new high point.

From 1955, Puhlmann worked as a freelance fashion illustrator for several German magazines and Vogue France, and taking the name Rico Puhlmann. At the same time, Puhlmann photographed fashion for German and international magazines such as Constanze, Burda, Vogue, Glamour, GQ, Harper's Bazaar, etc. He photographed celebrities including Isabella Rossellini, Cindy Crawford, Mel Gibson, Richard Avedon, Suzy Parker, Cheryl Tiegs, Naomi Campbell, Hildegard Knef and Agnieszka Kotlarska.

In 1970, Puhlmann settled in New York, where he continued his career as a fashion photographer and from then on contributed for publications such as Harper's Bazaar, Glamour, GQ and The New York Times. In 1972, Puhlmann received an award from the New York Society of Publication Designers for his photographic achievements.

From 1973 to 1976, Puhlmann contributed to the Sender Freies Berlin as an author, director, cameraman and presenter as part of the program "Fashion Journal - Sounds and Silhouettes". In 1976, he presented his own collection of blouses under the brand Rico Puhlmann Design. Puhlmann continued his work as a fashion photographer throughout the 1980s and 1990s, and designed the visual campaigns for fashion and cosmetics companies such as Ungaro, Fendi, Donna Karan, Calvin Klein, Estée Lauder, L'Oréal, Clinique and Revlon. His works were exhibited as part of the permanent exhibition "People, Fashion and Machines" at the Nordhorn City Museum in Germany.

== Death ==
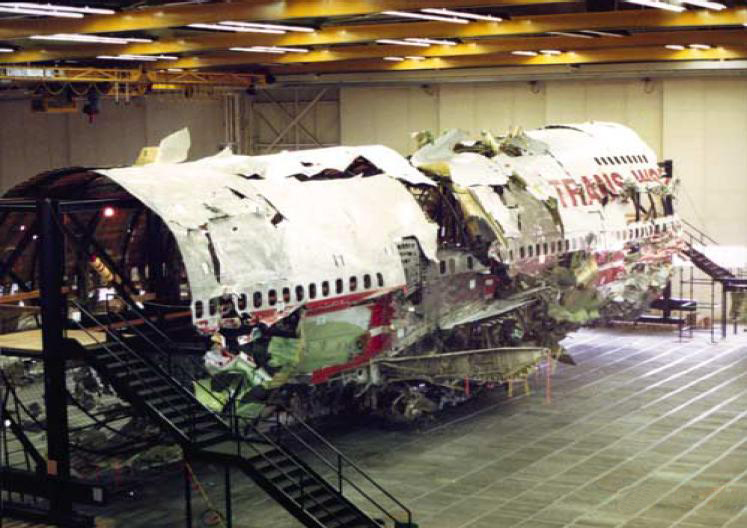
The reconstructed wreckage of TWA Flight 800, on which Puhlmann died

Puhlmann died on July 17, 1996, when N93119, the Boeing 747-100 used for TWA Flight 800, bound for Charles de Gaulle International Airport near Paris, exploded 12 minutes after take-off, off the coast of Long Island, New York, killing all of the 230 passengers and crew. He was en-route to an assignment in Paris and one of his clients, Polish model Agnieszka Kotlarska, backed out of flying on TWA Flight 800 at the last minute, narrowly escaping death. She was stabbed to death by a stalker six weeks later.

He was survived by his two brothers, Klaus and Heinz, both based in Berlin.

== Filmography ==
- 1942: Front Theatre
- 1943: Love Stories
- 1944: Dear Muck
- 1944: The Green Salon
- 1945: The Pyre
- 1949: The Marriage of Figaro
- 1954: Pole Poppenspäler
