= John Sahag =

Sahag Jamgotchian (January 2, 1952 – June 15, 2005), better known as John Sahag, was a Manhattan celebrity hairstylist, best known for the haircut he gave Demi Moore for the 1990 movie Ghost.

== Early life ==
Sahag was born in Beirut to Armenian parents. Sahag's father, Atum, was a couturier. Sahag began working in a salon when he was 7 years old. When he was 9 years old, his family (including his three brothers and sister) moved to Australia, where Sahag grew up.

== Career ==
When he was 18 Sahag moved to Paris, where he met Bernard Mériatt, a renowned French salon owner who worked with L'Oréal and Maniatis. Sahag signed a six-year contract with Mériatt and managed to feature on the cover of Vogue Italia.

He appeared as a hairdresser in the cult thriller The Eyes of Laura Mars with Faye Dunaway in 1977.

In the late 1970s, Sahag was associated with Shaun Casey, creating a stir by cutting her hair extremely short and bleaching it white for a Helmut Newton cover of French Vogue.

"John was like the mad professor of hair", said Edward Tricomi, owner of the Warren-Tricomi salon, who along with Sahag advocated a shift to dry-cutting in the late 1970s because it gave greater command of how a style would look.

As Sahag regularly travelled to New York, he decided to open his own salon there. In 1985, Sahag opened his first salon on Madison Avenue in New York City. Here he gained a number of celebrity clients that included Gwyneth Paltrow, Brad Pitt, Jennifer Aniston, Debra Messing, Mick Jagger and Jon Bon Jovi.

Brooke Shields, who cut the ribbon for his first salon in 1985, was quoted in the Workshop opening press release: "John is totally creative in every situation. Plus he looks sensational in black."

Some of Sahag's better known cuts included Demi Moore's 'boy cut' for Ghost and Paltrow's crop in Sliding Doors.

Sahag became well known as innovator of the dry cut technique.

His work appeared in many different advertisements, including Lancome's Isabella Rossellini ads and Calvin Klein Jeans as well as many different fashion shows, notably Issey Miyake in Paris. His work appeared in fashion and beauty magazines in the photographs of Helmut Newton, Irving Penn, Hiro, Albert Watson, Richard Avedon, and many others.

As well as Ghost, Sahag produced the hair styles featured in Year of the Dragon and the 1994 movie Nadja.

== Death ==
Sahag died of cancer, aged 53, in the Bronx in June 2005.

== Filmography ==
Year	Title	Role	Notes
1978	Eyes of Laura Mars	Hairdresser	
1983	Portfolio		(final film role)
