= Guy Beckley Stearns =

American homeopath (1870–1947)

Guy Beckley Stearns (16 September 1870 – 1947) was an American physician specializing in homeopathy and the developer of autonomic reflex testing in the study of homeopathic preparations. He also was the founder of the Foundation for Homeopathic Research. Stearns conducted early research with very highly potentized remedies first with fruit flies and later with the Emanometer, a tuning device made by Dr. William E. Boyd of Glasgow, Scotland.

== Childhood and education ==
He was born in Wilmot, New Hampshire, a son of Minot Stearns and his wife, the former Sara J. Hazeltine.

Stearns was a graduate of the Homeopathic Medical College in New York City and a 1900 graduate of New York Medical College

== Early career scandal ==
In 1907, when Stearns was a resident at Metropolitan Hospital (then located on Blackwell's Island in New York City), as well as Flower Free Surgical Hospital, he was arrested for performing an unspecified private operation on a nurse and longtime friend named Susan T. Greene (also known as Mrs. Graham), who then died of septic peritonitis. Given the evasiveness of the New York Times article about the case in terms of specifics, as well as considering that the nurse used the false name Mrs. Graham when she checked into Stearns's office and that she travelled from Boston to New York solely to be operated on by Stearns, with whom the paper reported she had worked in a resort hotel when they were teenagers, indicates that the doctor may have been arrested for performing an illegal abortion.

== Marriage ==
Stearns married Ada King prior to 21 April 1912. She died in 1956.

== Collections ==
Stearns was a well-known collector of rare books, including a 1479 edition of the works of Horace, a partial autograph manuscript of Mark Twain's A Tramp Abroad, and a first edition of Ben Jonson's Q Horatius Flaccus.
