= Sunny Harnett =

American actress and model

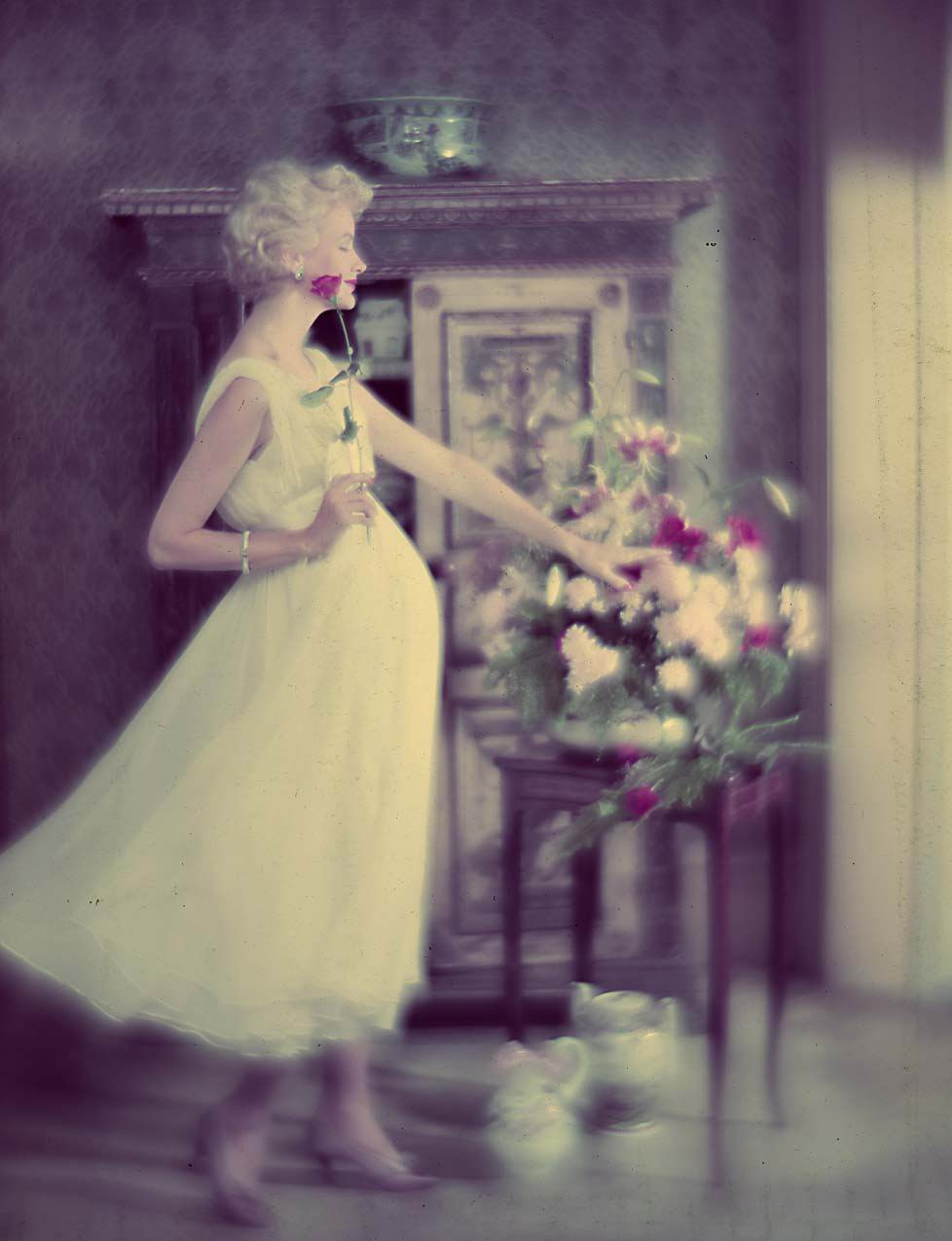
- Harnett photographed in the 1950s by Edgar de Evia
- Born: Annemarie Margot Elfreda Harnett; 1924; New York City, U.S.
- Died: May 1987 (aged 63)
- Children: 1

Annemarie Margot Elfreda "Sunny" Harnett (1924 – May 1987) was an American model, actress, and casting director. She can be found in fashion magazines throughout the 1950s, including frequently on the cover of Vogue, and was often a model of choice by photographer Edgar de Evia. Harper's Bazaar ranks her as one of the 26 greatest models of all time.

After becoming an assistant to Eileen Ford of Ford Models, she soon quit modeling. Harnett allegedly turned down the chance to represent Naomi Sims, who eventually became the first African-American supermodel, because Ford had "too many" black models already.

At some point, Harnett gained weight and underwent a mastectomy. Due to health concerns, she was later placed in a home for long-term care. According to fellow 1950s Ford model Betsy Pickering, Gerard W. ″Jerry″ Ford, founder of Ford Models, hospitalized Harnett for mental illness. Harnett died from injuries sustained in a fire at the home in May 1987 when she was 63.

She was also an actress and appeared in the film Funny Face (1957). An ash blonde, she was a favorite model of photographer Richard Avedon, who served as a thinly veiled model for Fred Astaire′s character of Dick Avery in Funny Face. Avedon snapped one of the most famous photos of Harnett, in which, clad in an evening gown by Grès, she peers at a roulette wheel in a casino in Le Touquet, France. That iconic August 1954 photograph fetched $35,000 when Christie's auctioned it in October 2012.

== Filmography ==
- Funny Face (1957)
