= Erwin Blumenfeld =

Photographer (1897–1969)

- Blumenfeld photographing Sophie Malgat, photographed by Gordon Parks, 1950
- Born: 26 January 1897; Berlin, Germany
- Died: 4 July 1969 (aged 72); Rome, Italy
- Known for: Fashion Photography

Erwin Blumenfeld (26 January 1897 – 4 July 1969) was an American photographer of German origin. He was born in Berlin, and in 1941 emigrated to the United States, where he soon became a successful and well-paid fashion photographer, working as a free-lancer for Harper's Bazaar, Life and American Vogue. His personal photographic work showed the influence of Dadaism and Surrealism; his two main areas of interest were death and women. He was expert in laboratory work, and experimented with photographic techniques such as distortion, multiple exposure, photo-montage and solarisation.

== History ==
Blumenfeld was born in Berlin on 26 January 1897, to atheistic Jewish free-thinker parents. As a young man he worked in the clothes trade and wrote poetry. In 1918 he went to Amsterdam, where he came into contact with Paul Citroen and Georg Grosz. In 1933 he made a photomontage showing Hitler as a skull with a swastika on its forehead; this image was later used in Allied propaganda material in 1943.

He married Lena Citroen, with whom he had three children, in 1921. In 1922 he started a leather goods shop, which failed in 1935. He moved to Paris, where in 1936 he set up as a photographer and did free-lance work for French Vogue. After the outbreak of the Second World War he was placed as an "undesirable alien" in several French internment camps, but in 1941, he was able to emigrate to the United States. There he soon became a successful and well-paid fashion photographer, and worked as a free-lancer for Harper's Bazaar, Life and American Vogue.

Blumenfeld died in Rome on 4 July 1969.

== Publications ==
Blumenfeld started working on Blumenfeld: Meine 100 Besten Fotos in 1955; it was eventually published in 1979; an English translation, Blumenfeld: My One Hundred Best Photos, was published in New York in 1981. Another autobiographical work was published in German by Eichborn Verlag in 1998, and in English as Eye to I: The Autobiography of a Photographer by Thames and Hudson in 1999.

== Retrospective exhibitions ==
- 1979: Musée Rath, Geneva, Switzerland
- 1981: Centre Pompidou, Paris
- 1996: Barbican Centre, London, travelling exhibition, also shown in Zurich, Lausanne, Berlin, Paris and Amsterdam
- 2006: Erwin Blumenfeld, his Dutch years, Fotomuseum Den Haag, The Hague, The Netherlands
- 2009: Erwin Blumenfeld Dada Montagen 1916-1933, Berlinische Galerie, Berlin
- 2012: Studio Blumenfeld, New York, 1941-1960, Nicéphore-Niépce Museum, Châlon-sur-Saône, France
- 2013: "Erwin Blumenfeld", Jeu de Paume Gallery, Paris, October 2013 to January 2014.
- 2022: "Erwin Blumenfeld: Fashion is a Game", La Samaritaine department store, Paris, February to May, 2022
- 2022: "Les Tribulations d’Erwin Blumenfeld, 1930-1950", musée d'Art et d'Histoire du judaïsme, Paris, October 2022 to March 2023

From 13 October 2022 to 5 March 2023, the Musée d'Art et d'Histoire du Judaïsme in Paris announced an exhibition titled "The Trials and Tribulations of Erwin Blumenfeld, 1930-1950". Presenting 180 photographs and an accompanying catalog, this exhibition spans what the curators considered Blumenfeld’s most famous and most experimental period. Further, it presents information on his artistic vision and his life during the Second World War. Apart from his well-known fashion photography, previously unpublished photo stories were included: One on a gypsy family at Saintes-Maries-de-la-Mer in Provence, France, and the other on ceremonial dances of Native Americans in New Mexico.
