= Dovima =

American actress

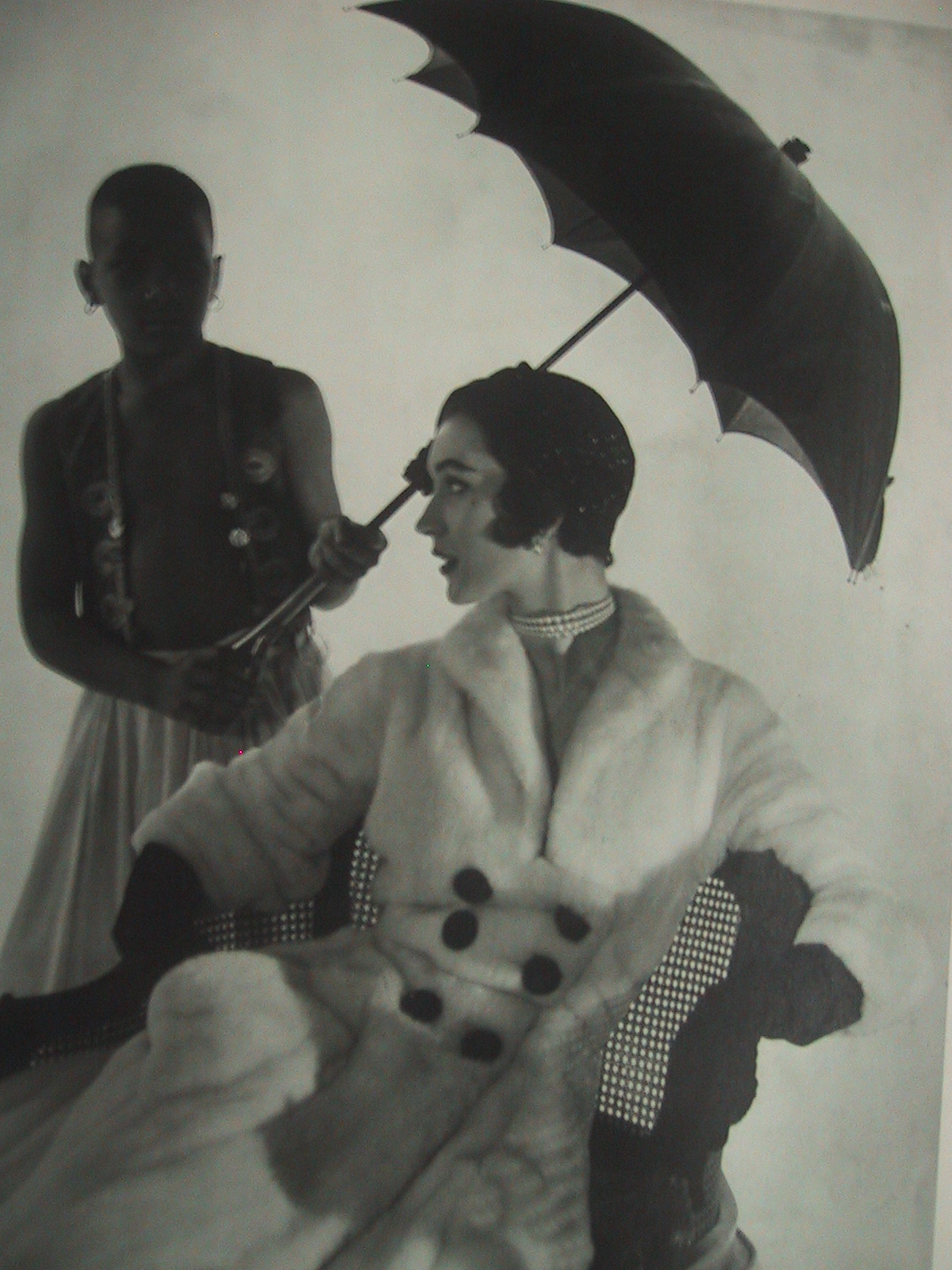
- Dovima in the 1950s (Photo by Edgar de Evia for a furrier)
- Born: Dorothy Virginia Margaret Juba; December 11, 1927; New York City, U.S.
- Died: May 3, 1990 (aged 62); Fort Lauderdale, Florida, U.S.
- Other names: Doe; Dorothy Horan
- Occupations: Model; actress
- Years active: 1949–1964
- Spouses: Jack Golden (m. 1948; div. 1957); Allan Murray (m. 1957; div. 1963); Casper West Hollingsworth (m. 1982; died 1986)
- Children: 1

Dorothy Virginia Margaret Juba (December 11, 1927 – May 3, 1990), known professionally as Dovima, was an American model during the 1950s.

== Biography ==
Dovima was born Dorothy Virginia Margaret Juba in Queens, New York. The name "Dovima" is composed of the first two letters of her three given names. She was the first model to use a single name.

Dovima was discovered on a sidewalk in New York by an editor at Vogue, and had a photo shoot with Irving Penn the following day. Throughout her career she worked closely with Richard Avedon, whose photograph of her in a floor-length black evening gown with circus elephants—Dovima with the Elephants—taken at the Cirque d'hiver, Paris, in August 1955, became an icon and sold for $1,151,976 in 2010. The gown was the first evening dress designed for Christian Dior by his new assistant, Yves Saint-Laurent. Dovima was reputed to be the highest-paid model of her time, demanding $60 per hour when most of the top models were receiving only around $25 per hour. She became known as the "Dollar-a-Minute Girl."

She had a minor role as Marion in the film Funny Face. The character was an aristocratic-looking but empty-headed fashion model.

Dovima gave birth to a daughter named Allison on July 14, 1958, in Manhattan. Allison's father was Dovima's second husband, Allan Murray.

Dovima was left penniless when her marriage to Murray ended in divorce. Throughout the 1960s, she first tried acting then attempted working as an agent but found little success. Eventually, by the 1970s, she had moved in with her parents in Florida, and was working as a hostess at The Two Guys Pizza Parlor in Fort Lauderdale, Florida, by the 1980s.

She died of liver cancer on May 3, 1990, at the age of 62.

== Filmography ==
- Kraft Suspense Theatre as Mrs. Aline Parmenter (1 episode, 1964)
- The Man from U.N.C.L.E. as Mrs. Karda (1 episode, 1964)
- My Favorite Martian as Model (1 episode, 1964)
- Funny Face (1957) as Marion

== See also ==
- Dorian Leigh
- Suzy Parker
