= Evelyn Tripp =

Top Model

Evelyn Tripp (1927-1995) was a leading fashion model of the 1950s and 1960s.

Evelyn Tripp was born in a small home on the outskirts of Gumbo, Missouri, in 1927, the daughter of a lead miner.

Tripp was discovered by an assistant to Louise Dahl-Wolfe, the Harper's Bazaar photographer, whilst working as a clerical assistant when shopping on New York's Fifth Avenue.

She appeared on the cover of 40 magazines, starting with Vogue in January 1949.

She was married to Stan Young. She died of colon cancer at her home in Remsenburg, Long Island, New York, aged 68.
