= Melvin Sokolsky =

American photographer and film director (1933–2022)

- Born: October 9, 1933; New York City, New York, U.S.
- Died: August 29, 2022 (aged 88); Beverly Hills, California, U.S.
- Occupation: Photographer
- Spouse: Button Whelan (died 2016)
- Children: 1

Melvin Sokolsky (October 9, 1933 – August 29, 2022) was an American photographer and film director.

== Early life ==
Born in New York City in 1933, Sokolsky was raised on the Lower East Side. He had no formal training in photography, but started to use his father's box camera at about the age of ten. Always analytical, he started to realize the role that emulsion played as he compared his own photographs with those his father had kept in albums through the years. "I could never make my photographs of Butch the dog look like the pearly finish of my father's prints, and it was then that I realized the importance of the emulsion of the day."

== Career ==
Around 1954, Sokolsky met Robert Denning, who at the time worked with photographer Edgar de Evia, at an East Side gym. "I discovered that Edgar was paid $4000 for a Jell-O ad, and the idea of escaping from my tenement dwelling became an incredible dream and inspiration.

He made editorial fashion photographs for publications such as Harper's Bazaar (for which he produced, in 1963, a "Bubble" series of photographs depicting fashion models "floating" in giant clear plastic bubbles suspended in midair above the River Seine in Paris), Vogue and The New York Times. Three quarters of his print photography has been for advertising, which does not usually carry a byline. Sokolsky said in an interview: "I resented the attitude that 'This is editorial and this is advertising'. I always felt, why dilute it? Why not always go for the full shot?" Toward the end of the 1960s, Sokolsky worked as both commercial director and cameraman. In early 2002, Sokolsky shot the pictures for Celine Dion’s A New Day Has Come.

== Personal life and death ==
Sokolsky was married to Button Whelan; she died in 2016. He died on August 29, 2022, at the age of 88 in Beverly Hills, California.
