= Alberto Rizzo =

Italian photographer and painter

Alberto Rizzo (May 2, 1931 – October 9, 2004), was an Italian photographer and painter.

== Early Life ==
He was born in La Spezia, outside of Rome. Rizzo studied painting, design, and graphic arts at the Accademia delle Belle Arti di Brera, Milan. Rizzo was also trained as a classical ballet dancer in Italy and France working with choreographers such as Maurice Béjart. He moved to California in 1960. He started off his American career in California.

== Photography ==
By 1961, Rizzo began his career as a photographer, moving to New York City in 1965 and working at Harper's Bazaar. He also published in various national versions of Vogue, Vanity Fair, Glamour, and GQ, among many others. Commercial clients included: Bloomingdale's, Bergdorf Goodman, Saks Fifth Avenue, Armani, Chanel, Charles James, Revlon, Clinique, Max Factor, Charles of the Ritz, Helena Rubinstein, Bulgari, Piaget, Seiko, Tiffany, David Webb, etc.

Rizzo's pioneering photography received many distinguished awards throughout the late 1960s and early 1970s, including the 1969, 1970, and 1971 Art Directors Club of America Awards as well as the 1972 Coty American Fashion Critics' Award and in 1978 the Andy Award of Excellence. In the late 1980s, Rizzo began experimenting with photoprinting on different surfaces and in 1994 he filed a patent for Photoprinting on Metal and Similar Substrates with the United States Patent Office.

His works have been featured in several photography books and publications including: Snoopy Around the World (Le Tour du Monde de Snoopy), Photographs by Alberto Rizzo and commentaries by Charles M. Schulz (1990), Anthony Mazzola's 125 Great Moments of Harper's Bazaar (1993), and Italian Eyes: Italian Fashion Photography from 1951 to Today. His work also appeared in Harper's Bazaar 150 Years: The Greatest Moments.

Rizzo had one man exhibitions at several prestigious galleries in New York, Miami, and Milan.

In 2019, seven of Rizzo’s photographs were accepted into the permanent collection of The J. Paul Getty Museum in Los Angeles. Alberto Rizzo moved to Florida at the end of his life and died in Miami, FL on October 9, 2004.

== Sources ==
- Photos on Concept Impages
- Photography Now
- http://www.exibart.com/profilo/eventiV2.asp/idelemento/25193
- https://web.archive.org/web/20041216093441/http://danielazoulaygallery.com/alberto_rizzo/1index.html
