= 1930s in Western fashion =

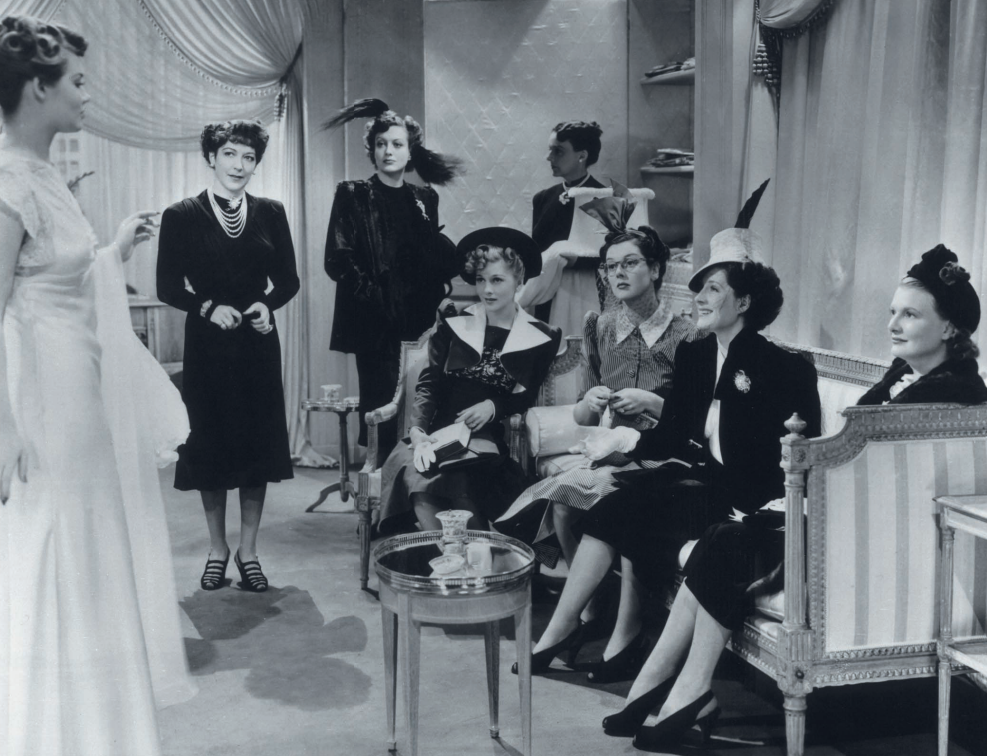
In this film still from The Women (1939), cast members—including Norma Shearer, Joan Crawford and Rosalind Russell—are shown outfits at a high-end fashion house. In the 1930s, the film industry—especially Hollywood—became a major influence on fashion and challenged the dominance of Parisian couturiers in setting and disseminating trends.

Western fashion in the 1930s was characterized—in womenswear—by a departure from the boxy, boyish look from the previous decade in favor of a more mature and feminine silhouette, with the return of natural waistlines and a heightened emphasis on glamour, elegance and sophistication. The era is well framed by two major world events: the 1929 Wall Street Crash, with the ensuing Great Depression that lasted until the end of the decade; and the onset of World War II in 1939. Since they are situated between the "roaring" era of the 1920s and the period of war-induced austerity of the 1940s, the 1930s are often overlooked in fashion history discussions and reduced to a mere transitional era. Nevertheless, the 1930s saw many changes and innovations in fashion design, technology and consumer culture, and has been referred to as the "Design Decade" both contemporaneously and in modern times. The period was also one of expansion and consolidation of the Hollywood film industry and its star system, which became a key actor in the setting and dissemination of fashion trends, a role hitherto dominated by the haute couture centered in Paris.

Although the 1930s were considered a period of great modernity in clothing, the new styles were defined by a reinterpretation of the past. At the beginning of the decade, the neoclassical style—so called because of its ancient Greek influence—emerged and defined the look of the period, which highlighted the natural female figure through the innovation of the bias cut. Pioneered by couturier Madeleine Vionnet, the technique consisted of cutting the fabrics at an angle instead of in a straight line, which made them drape smoothly over the woman's figure. This meant that for the first time in the history of Western fashion, dresses skimmed to the body without any sculpting underlayer. Other styles that characterized the decade were romanticism, which recovered elements of Victorian fashion; and surrealism, epitomized in the work of designer Elsa Schiaparelli.

Some of the leading fashion designers of the 1930s include the French-based Vionnet, Schiaparelli, Madame Grès, Jeanne Lanvin, Edward Molyneux, Jean Patou and Robert Piguet; the British Norman Hartnell and Victor Stiebel; and the Americans Hattie Carnegie, Jessie Franklin Turner, Nettie Rosenstein, Valentina, Sally Milgrim and Elizabeth Hawes, among others. The most influential costume designer of Hollywood was Adrian, with Orry-Kelly, Travis Banton, Walter Plunkett and Dolly Tree also being prominent. The decade was also the heyday of fashion illustrations, as well as a time of great growth for fashion photography, with influential figures like Edward Steichen, George Hoyningen-Huene, Horst P. Horst, Louise Dahl-Wolfe, Cecil Beaton, Martin Munkácsi, Erwin Blumenfeld, George Platt Lynes and John Rawlings. Some of the female fashion icons of the era include Hollywood stars such as Joan Crawford, Bette Davis, Marlene Dietrich, Vivien Leigh, Katharine Hepburn, Jean Harlow, Carole Lombard and Ginger Rogers, as well as socialites like Daisy Fellowes, Mona von Bismarck, Barbara Hutton and Wallis Simpson, who rose to fame for her relationship with King Edward VIII, a style icon in his own right. Other menswear fashion icons of the 1930s were also Hollywood stars, among them Clark Gable, Gary Cooper, James Stewart, Cary Grant, Fred Astaire and Errol Flynn.

== Women's fashion ==
=== General trends ===
==== Sophistication amidst the Depression ====
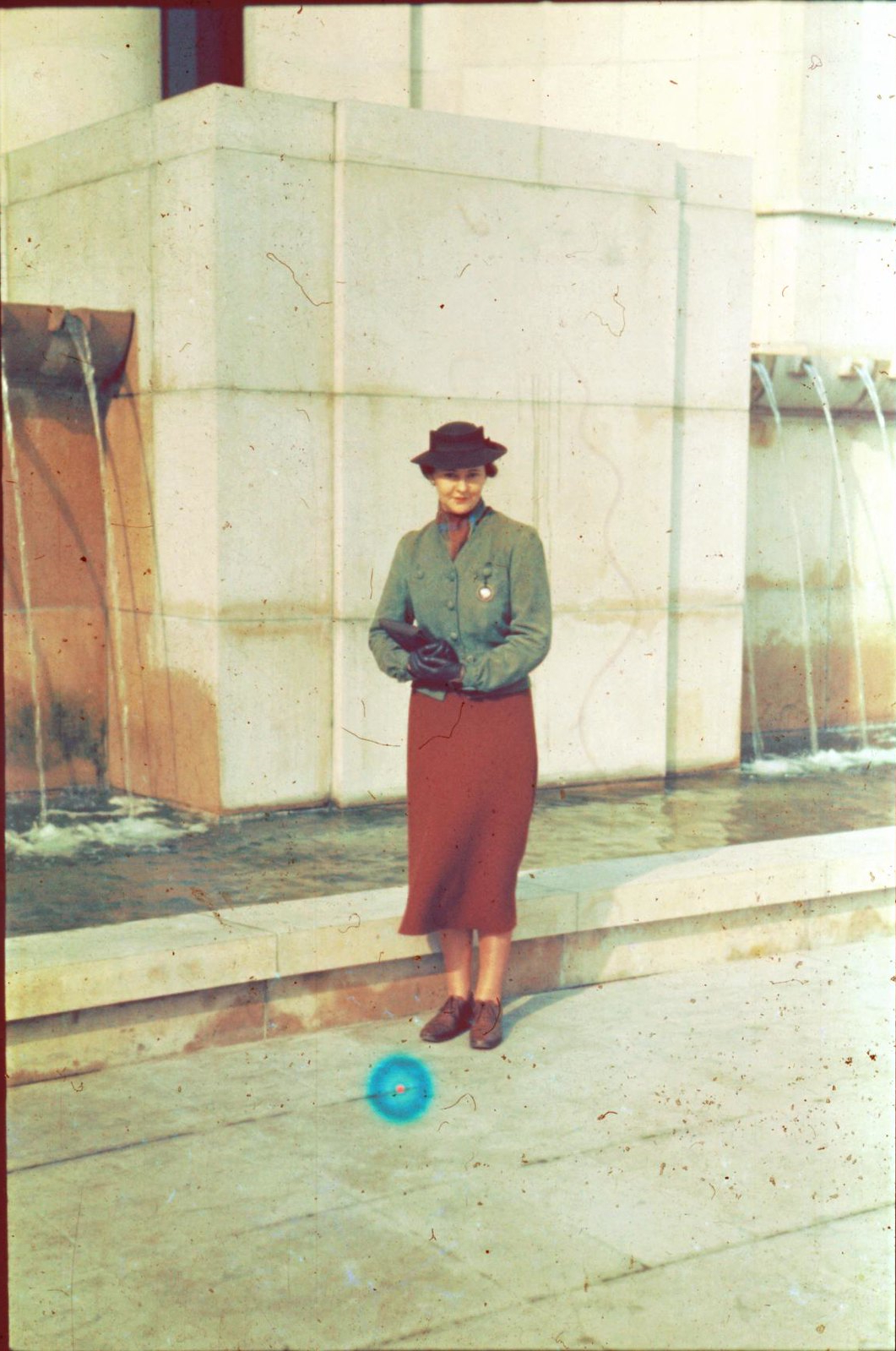
A Dutch tourist in Paris during the World Expo in 1937.

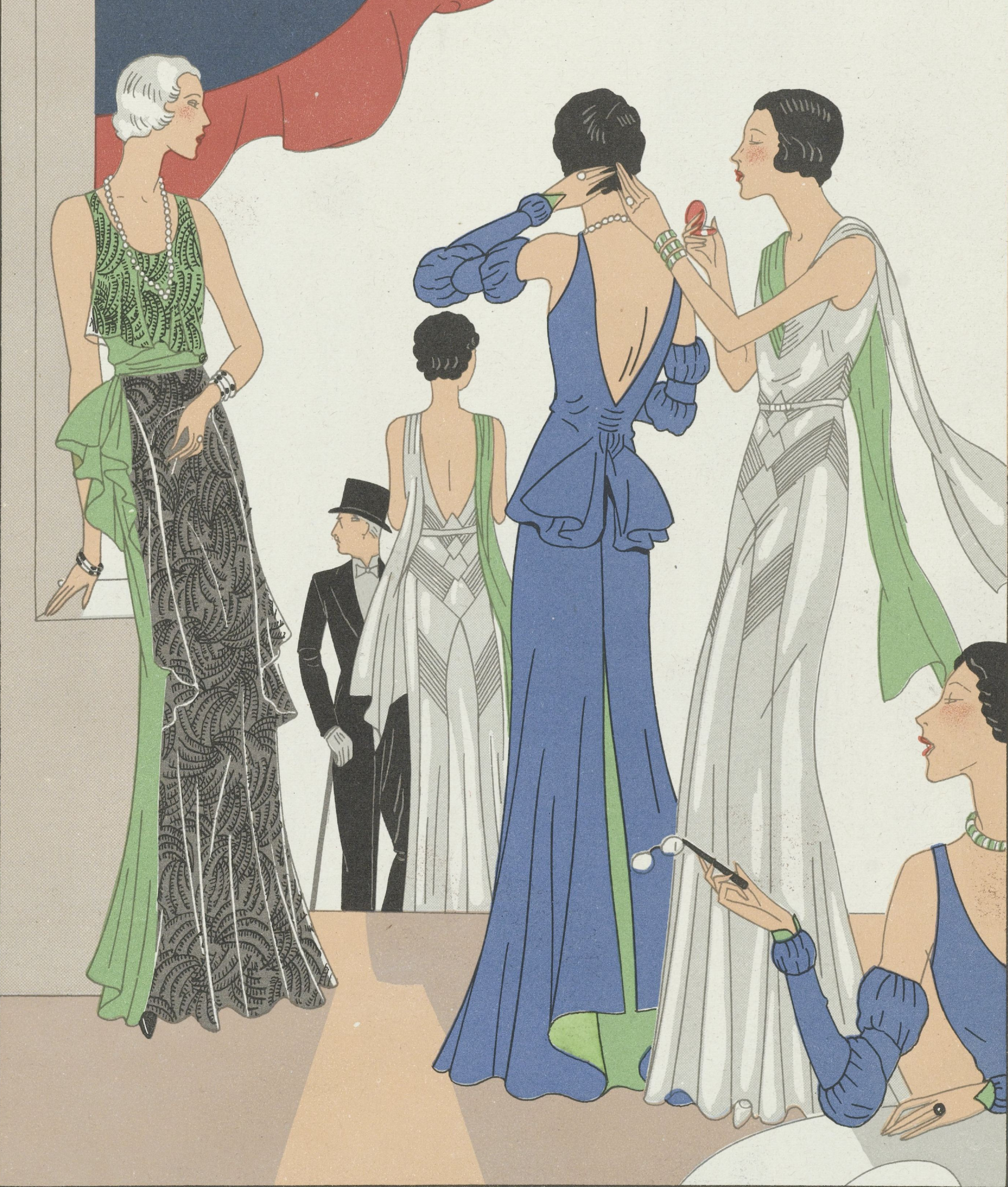
Evening gown styles in a French fashion plate from March 1932. Despite the Great Depression and the rise of political conservatism, the decade's fashion was characterized by glamorous opulence and a new emphasis on the female figure.

The 1930s are well framed by two major world events: the Wall Street Crash of 1929 and the outbreak of World War II in 1939, situated between the "roaring" era of the 1920s and the period of war-induced austerity of the 1940s, and defined by the decade-long severe economic crisis of the Great Depression. While the fashion of the previous decade had been characterized by great modernity and liberation, with an emphasis on youthfulness and a straight, flat silhouette that hid feminine curves, the 1930s took off with a shift towards a more womanly and elegant form, with hemlines coming down and the waistline returning to its natural position. This change in the female silhouette has often been attributed to the effects of the Great Depression, as a clear expression of the end of the Jazz Age. For example, dress historian James Laver wrote in 1960: "It was as if fashion were trying to say: 'The party is over; the Bright Young Things are dead.' As in 1820, the return of the waist to its normal position symbolized a movement towards a new paternalism: in economic terms the American Slump; in political terms the rise of Hitler." In the United States, rural populations were already making attire from recycled cotton feed sacks since the early 20th century, but the economic struggles exacerbated by the Great Depression made these "feed sack dresses" even more widespread in the 1930s, prompting companies to offer printed and better-quality options to appeal to lower-income communities. The effects of the Great Depression even reached the fashion of Parisian high society, according to a story published by The New York Times in July 1932:

Summer soirees held in Parisian embassies, long famous for the brilliance of the women's costumes, this year reveal many gowns of the last year's vintage worn with jewels worth hundreds of thousands of dollars. The jewels remain as souvenirs of more prosperous days, while the price of a new frock is often lacking. Many of the wealthiest women who have not yet felt the pinch are dressing more simply than last year, since they feel ostentatious costume is bad taste these days. White satin gowns are favorites with many smart women for formal embassy function, since they can be worn with different jewels and varicolored wraps and slippers. They follow somewhat classic lines, which have not varied markedly within the last two years and may be worn without appearing hopelessly out of date.

A notable shift in color also marked the decade's opening years. Black, which had dominated fashion in the late 1920s, gave way to white and off-white, prompting Vogue to observe in June 1931: "It would appear that white has sought to fill the place left vacant by black." White became the default for evening, formal daytime occasions, and town wear, though black continued to be worn, often combined with icy pastels or saturated jewel tones, and a wide range of sophisticated tertiary shades appeared in both day- and eveningwear.

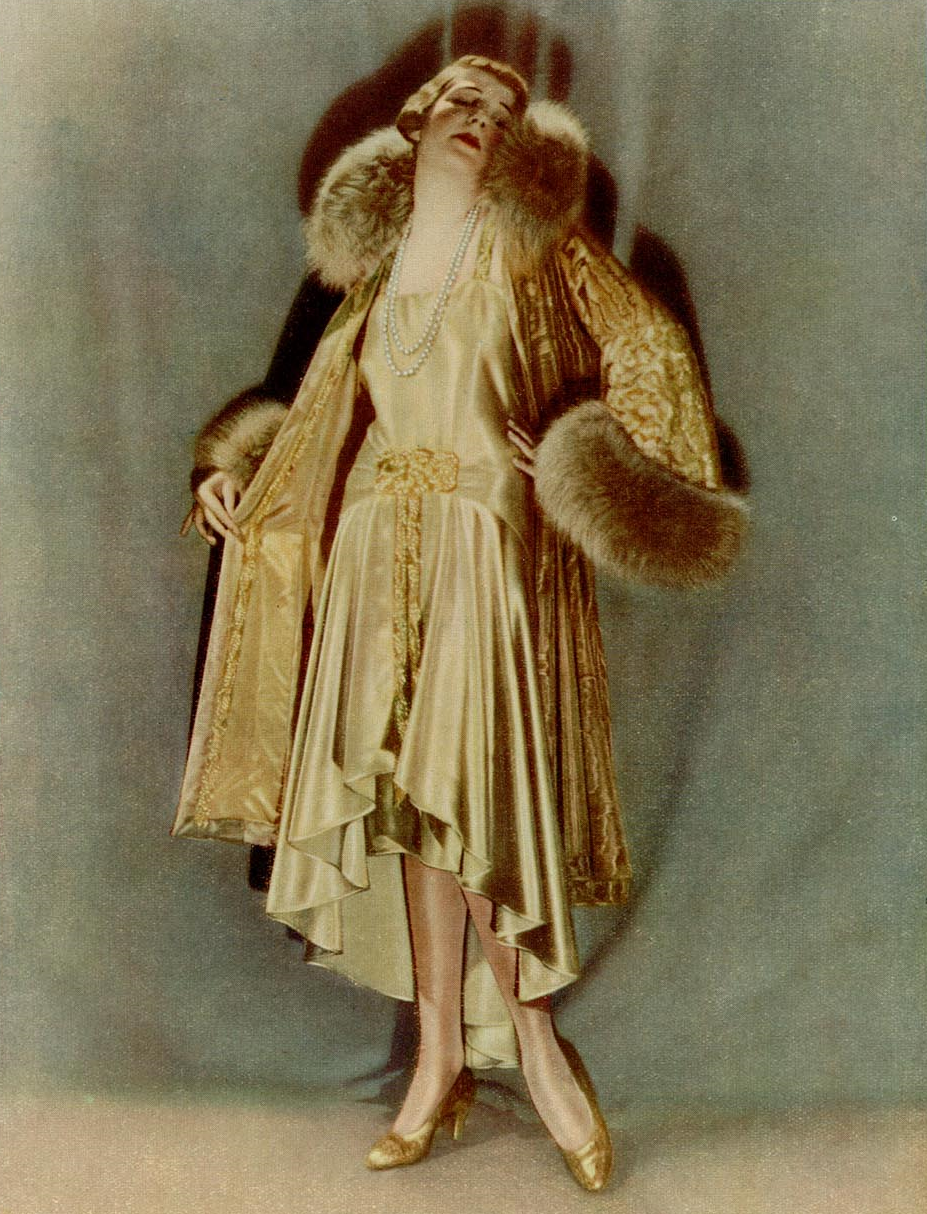
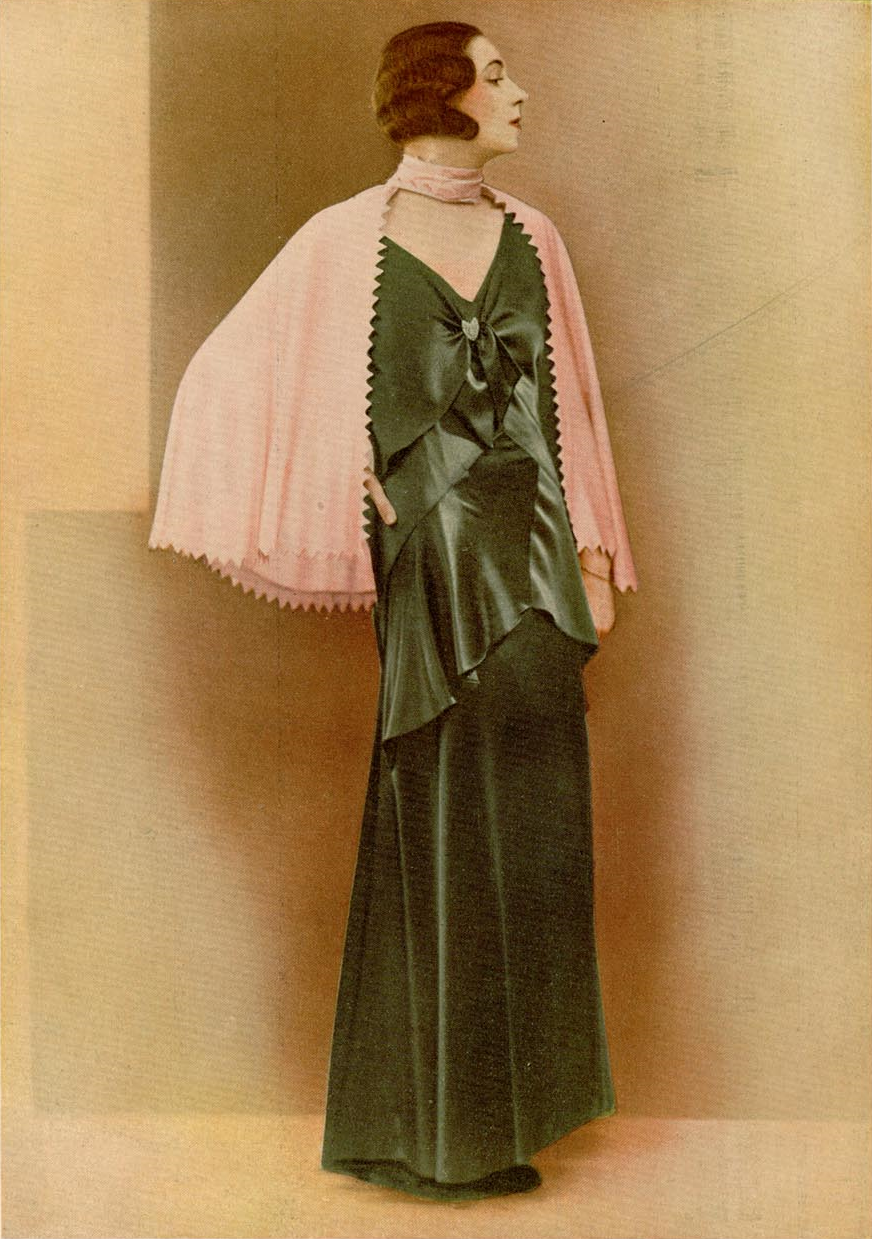
Evening gown models shown in the Dutch women's magazine Gracieuse in August 1929 (left) and November 1930 (right). Although often considered an abrupt change from the previous decade, the early 1930s silhouette—with natural waistlines and longer hemlines—was more of an evolution of previous trends.

Although the new look of the 1930s is often described as a radical change triggered by the Great Depression, a closer inspection reveals that it was rather a continuation of trends from the late 1920s. The flat, almost cubist silhouettes of the early 1920s gave way to more form-fitting shapes in the latter part of the decade; between 1927 and 1928, dresses began to follow the body's natural lines again, closely hugging the hips due to the inclusion of diagonal waist panels. The waistline, which had been absent at the beginning of the 1920s and then appeared lower, returned to its natural height by the end of the decade, and hemlines, which had steadily risen to their highest point between 1925 and 1926, dropped again in 1928, often featuring floating panels at the back and sides of skirts and dresses. Thus, as noted by fashion historian Emmanuelle Dirix: "even before the Crash, the main features of what we now remember as a typical 1930s silhouette were already in place." Likewise, Karina Reddy of the Fashion Institute of Technology pointed out: "Despite these departures from the prevailing mode of the previous decade, the popular styles of the early 1930s were similar in their simple lines to the popular garçonne look of the twenties. But while the simplicity of the 1920s created a sack-like silhouette free from curves, the simple lines of the early thirties hugged those curves, creating a soft, feminine silhouette."

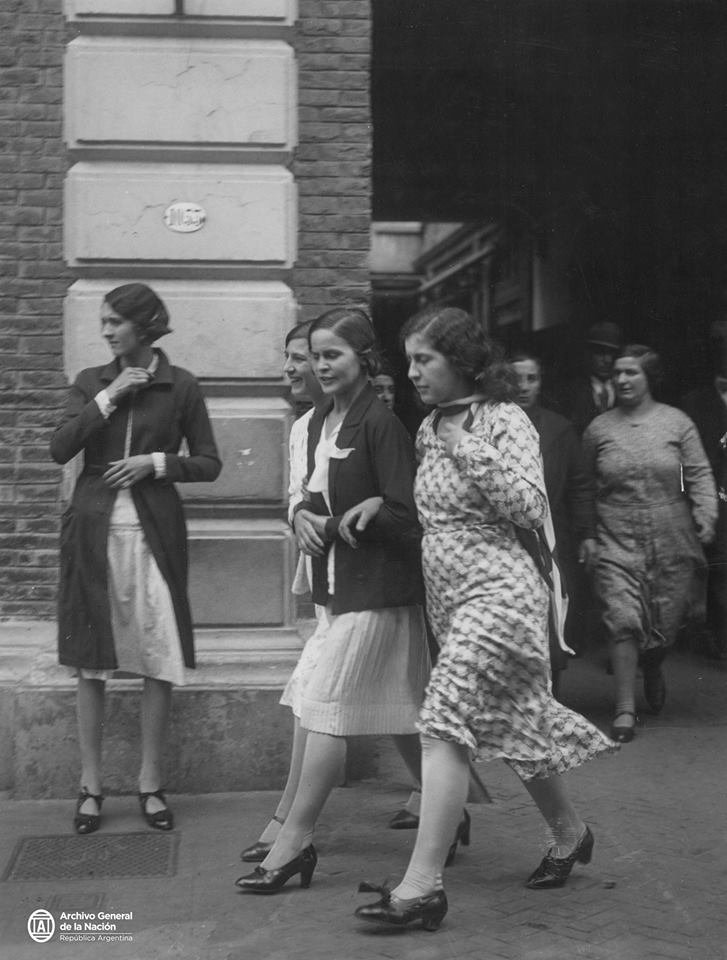
A group of working women leaving the factory in Buenos Aires, 1933.

It could be hypothesized that the Great Depression of the 1930s would have prompted an increase in skirt hemlines as a practical response to material scarcity, yet they remained long until the decade's end. Similarly, despite rising conservative ideologies around the world, 1930s fashion notably diverged from understated and modest sartorial expressions, instead witnessing a flourishing of opulent and glamorous fashion trends that contradicted prevailing socio-political currents. In the context of a 2014 exhibition focused on the decade, The Museum at FIT described it as a "startling paradox", noting that it "is a compelling irony that the elegant and progressive qualities of 1930s fashions emerged during one of the most tumultuous periods of modern Western history", and that "despite these crises—or maybe in reaction to them—the 1930s exuded an especial elegance: the blatantly beautiful neo-classic, art moderne aesthetic." Likewise, Dirix wrote: "This is what is so intriguing about a fashion study of the 1930s—it allows us to see that whilst fashion may be inextricably bound up with culture, the way it influences and is influenced by the world is neither obvious nor overtly logical. To understand fashion one not only has to look at the culture that produced and consumed it, but one also has to be able to 'read' the garments themselves."

The streamlined silhouette carried an unexpected social logic: the new clothes simultaneously disguised wealth and concealed financial decline, serving as what one historian described as "inconspicuous consumption for the rich few and inexpensive good taste for the newly hard-pressed middle class." Yet if the new clothes leveled visible class distinctions in dress, they exposed something else entirely: the figure beneath. As Vogue described the fashions, they were "ruthless new dresses," and the sentiment associated with Wallis Simpson—"You can never be too rich or too thin"—captured the spirit of an era in which a slender, toned physique had become a marker of privilege. Liberation from the corset meant, paradoxically, an intensified preoccupation with the body itself: the reducing salon, the appetite-suppressing cigarette, and the girdle all flourished as women worked to achieve the necessary silhouette. It was in this context that Viennese psychiatrist Paul Schilder, working in New York, coined the term "body image" in 1934 to describe the culturally mediated and socially dependent relationship between individuals and their physical selves—a concept that had, as he observed, become newly urgent in the age of the streamlined dress.

==== The bias cut and neoclassicism ====
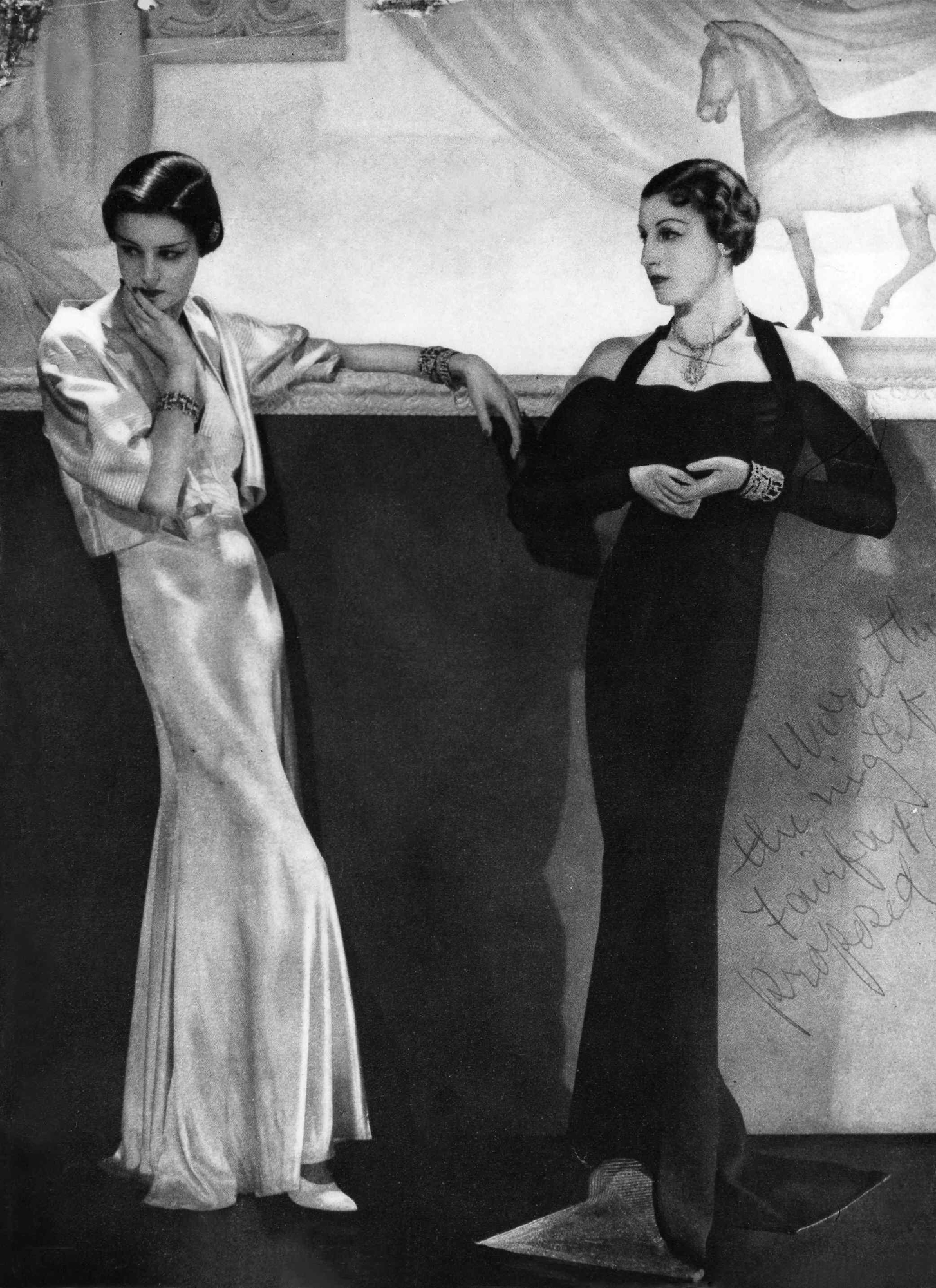
Two models from Lanvin's 1933 fall-winter collection.

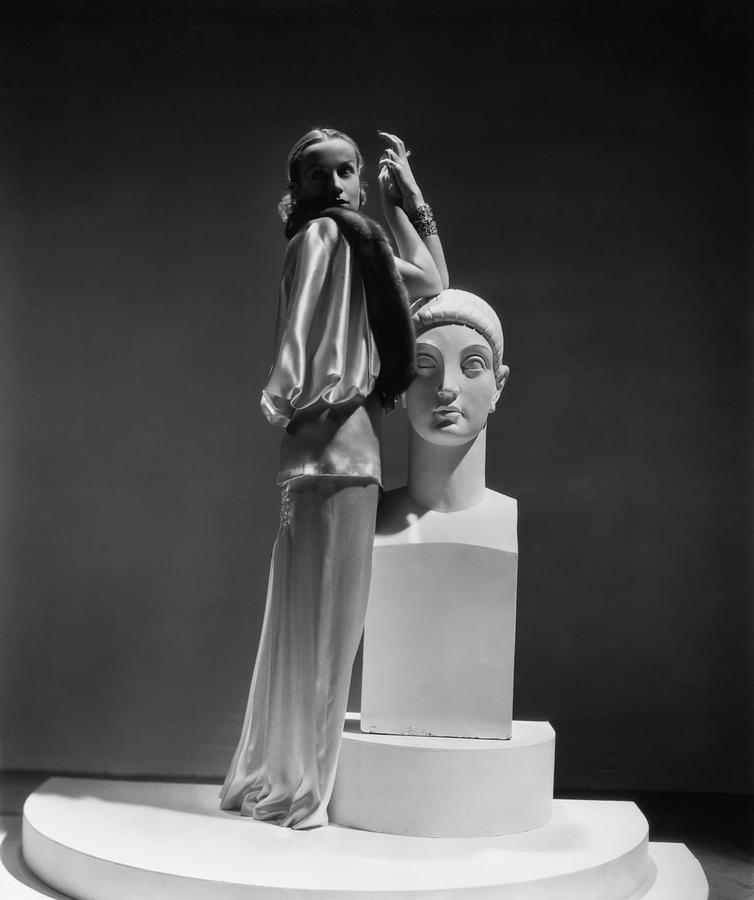
Carole Lombard in Rumba (1935), wearing a Travis Banton design.

The early 1930s were marked by the emergence of the neoclassical style and its bias cut dresses, whose sleek lines and draped fabrics accentuated the natural shape of the female body and recalled ancient Greek attire.

Although the decade saw the return of natural waistlines and longer skirts and sleeves, fashion historian James Laver noted that "there is no exact parallel between the fashions of the early 1930s and those of a century before, for the waist did not become excessively tight and the general lines of the skirt remained more or less perpendicular."

Crucial to this new silhouette of the early 1930s was the so-called bias cut technique, which involved "cutting fabric on the bias at a 45 degree angle on the woven fabric against the weave". The bias cut was championed by French designer Madeleine Vionnet in the 1920s and, by the early 1930s, it became a popular style for creating garments that lightly hugged a woman's curves, contributing to the overall slender look of the era. Vionnet, who called herself an "enemy of fashion," believed in the body as its own best support structure: "A woman's muscles," she said, "are the best corset one could imagine." In particular, the body-skimming style dominated eveningwear, characterized by satin dresses with low backs that hugged the body's curves and flared at the bottom, creating a "fluid and feminine silhouette". The resulting silhouette was, as Laver described, "slim and straight, being sometimes wider at the shoulders than at the hips", with couturiers employing every device to convey an impression of height—including dressing the hair close to the head.

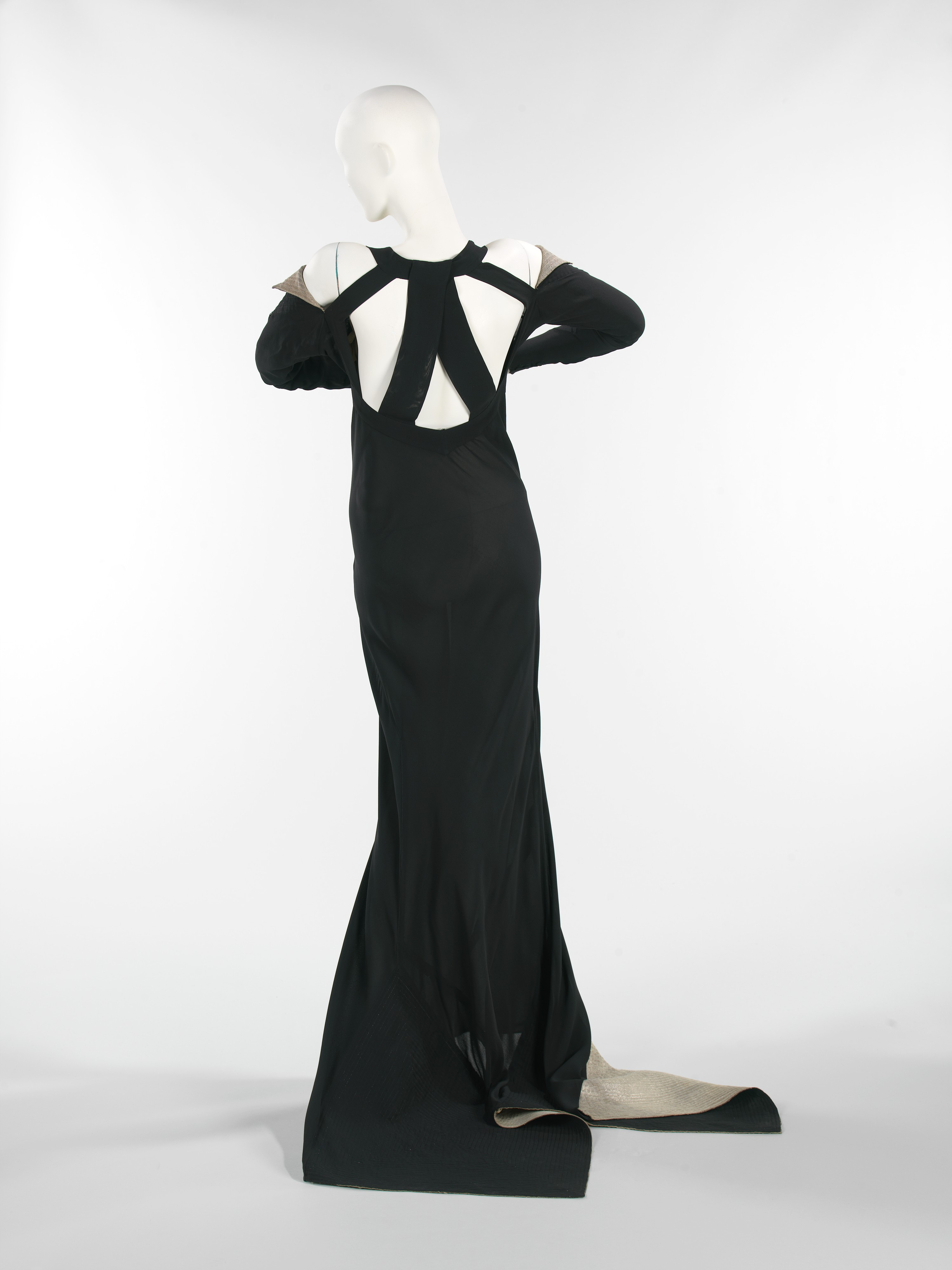
Phèdre, a bias-cut evening gown in black silk and metal by Jeanne Lanvin, 1933.

The predominant fashion trend of the early 1930s was the so-called neoclassic style, which drew inspiration from classical Greece. In September 1930, the French magazine L'Officiel de la Mode observed "a tendency towards classicism and pure Greek lines" in the latest Paris collections, singling out Vionnet as having been "decidedly" influenced by Greek art. Neoclassical fashion was defined by "white and ivory columnar bias-cut evening dresses [that] often featured Greek details such as cowl or cascade drapes." Fashion publications compared garments to Greek architecture, while editorials frequently juxtaposed models with ancient columns and sculptures. One of the most notable proponents of this style was French designer Augusta Bernard, who was known for her expertise with the bias cut. More than half of the leading Paris couture houses of the era were headed by women—including not only Vionnet and Coco Chanel but now-lesser-known figures such as Louise Boulanger and Augusta Bernard—whose social backgrounds outside the elite gave them a distinctive freedom to reimagine fashion.

Although the Art Deco style is generally considered to have reached its peak in the 1920s, it continued into the 1930s as an element of the "modernist aesthetic" that was popular in clothing and textile design.

The ballerina skirt—a "wide skirt, often of several layers of light fabric, of mid-calf length and inspired by classical ballets"—was especially popular during the 1930s.

For evening attire, the "erogenous zone" shifted decisively from the legs to the back: gowns were crafted to showcase deep, open backs, and many dresses of the period, as Laver observed, seemed to "have been designed to be seen from the rear." Even daywear incorporated slits up the back, and skirts were drawn tightly over the hips. This emphasis on the bare back was closely linked to the decade's vogue for sunbathing: the first backless bathing costumes appeared simultaneously with backless evening gowns, both reflecting the new cultural premium placed on exposed, bronzed skin.

==== Hollywood glamour ====
We, the couturiers, can no longer live without the cinema any more than the cinema can live without us. We corroborate each other's instinct.

— French haute couture designer Lucien Lelong, 1935.

The concept of glamour became ubiquitous in the 1930s, and the decade has been described as the "Golden Age of Glamour". As noted by Stephen Gundle, the "[glamour] phenomenon became so widespread that it was freely attached to the most diverse people and roles", as the term was even extended to designate men or boys. The main driver of fashion for glamour was the Hollywood film industry, as women around the world sought to integrate elements of the movie stars into their personal styles. Actresses such as Jean Harlow, Joan Crawford, Greta Garbo, Marlene Dietrich and Bette Davis became some of the first style icons of Hollywood and had a direct influence on fashion, beginning to replace the traditional role of the upper classes as leading trendsetters. Harlow in particular popularized the white evening gown; Adrian created gowns for her in white charmeuse cut on the bias—so sleek to her body that she reportedly wore no underwear beneath them and was frequently unable to sit down between takes, instead reclining on specially constructed boards.

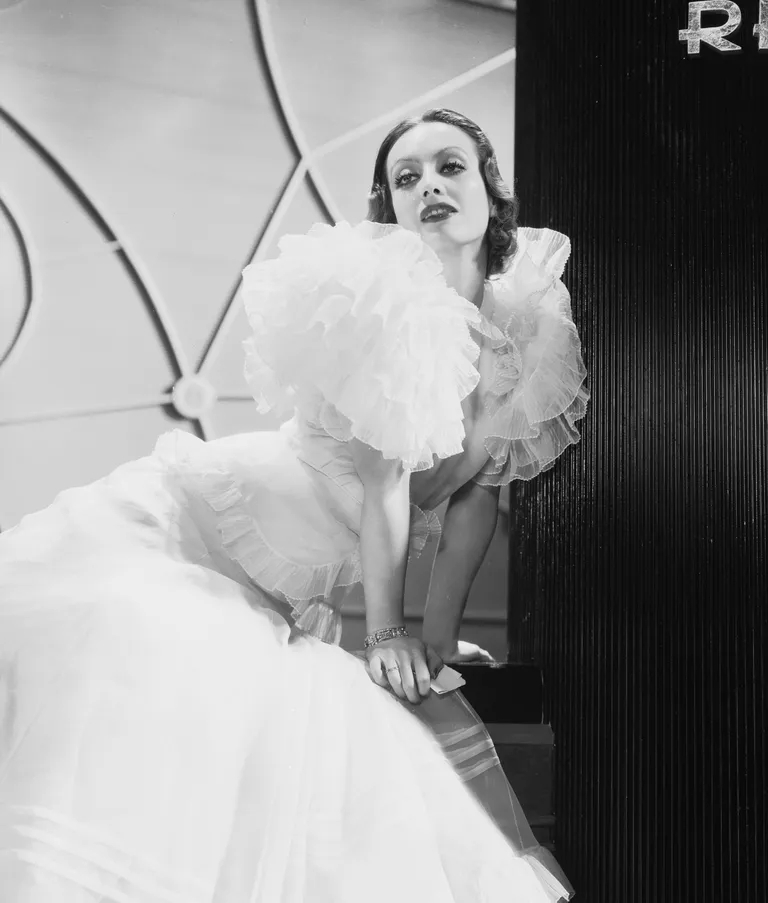
Joan Crawford in Letty Lynton (1932), wearing the influential organdie dress by Adrian that created a craze for similar designs.

The effects of the Great Depression solidified Hollywood's role in fashion, as studios reframed celebrity as a relatable yet heightened ideal, fully integrating glamour into American culture and shifting its perception from a foreign concept to a domestic product. This transformation peaked as glamour became a central commodity for Hollywood, offering the public an escape from widespread poverty. Studio publicity teams capitalized on this by promoting the idea that women could model their appearance after a star with comparable physical traits or personality. To support this trend, fashion and beauty advice attributed to actresses appeared frequently in magazines and retail outlets, while pattern companies produced affordable versions of film costumes for public consumption. In its early years, Hollywood relied on European theatrical costumes and Parisian haute couture due to a lack of confidence in shaping fashion trends, but this dependence was a transitional phase that allowed it to eventually become a dominant force in glamour by the 1930s.

During an era when brand names held minimal influence, film stars emerged as key drivers of fashion innovation. Their attire—featuring costly materials, unique designs, and luxurious furs—conveyed associations with high society, European sophistication, and exclusivity, captivating audiences with its aspirational appeal. The immense popularity of these stars enabled them to penetrate fashion magazines previously reserved for social elites, reshaping the industry's dynamics. Unlike traditional aristocrats, American film stars presented an attainable ideal, blending exaggerated femininity with a relatable persona, inspiring admiration and emulation among audiences. As noted by Stephen Gundle, Hollywood pioneered a distinctive style that blended high fashion, mass spectacle, and accessible streetwear, creating a reproducible yet theatrical aesthetic.

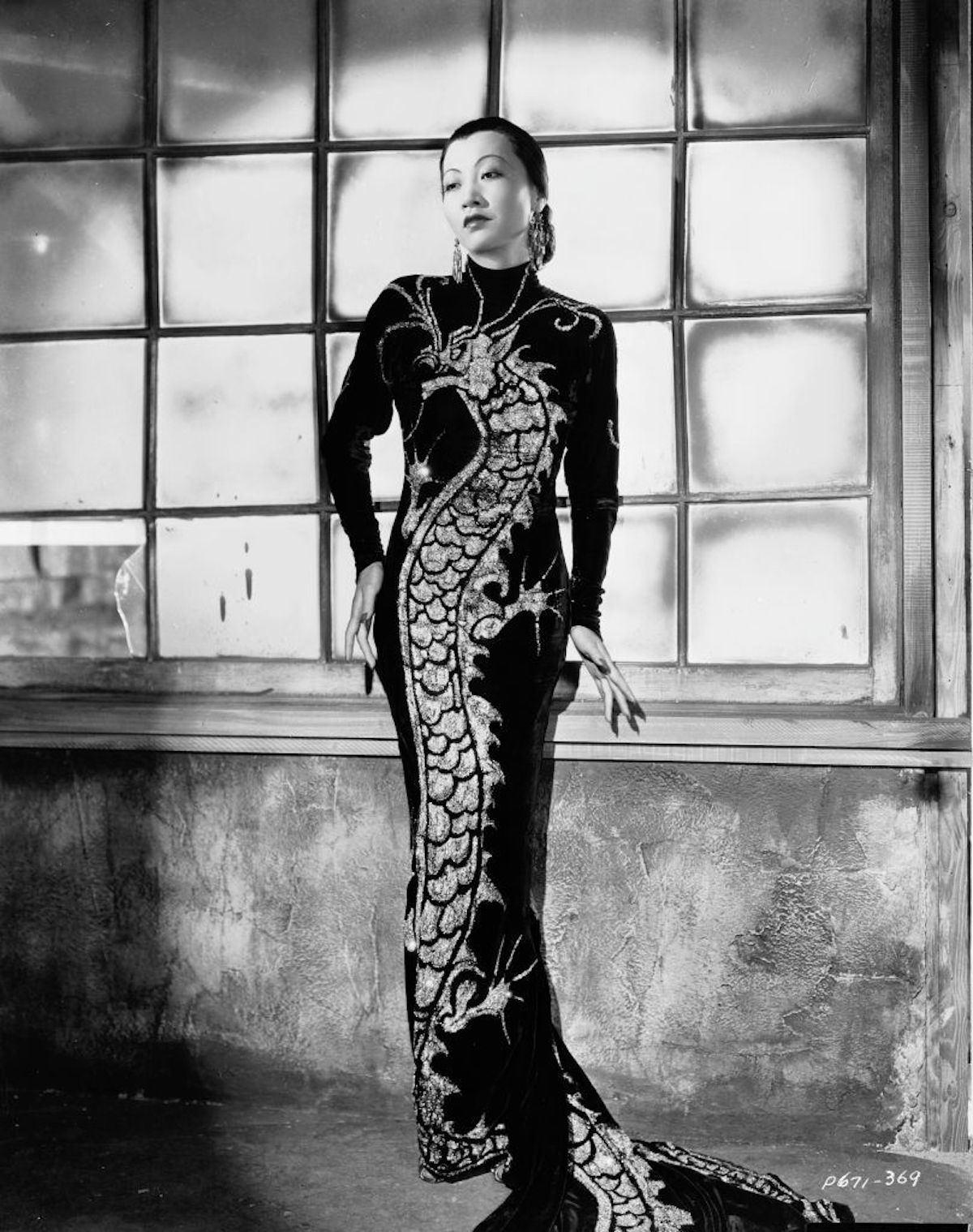
Anna May Wong in Limehouse Blues (1934), wearing a reintepretation of the Chinese cheongsam by Travis Banton.

Hollywood's rise as a fashion influencer was bolstered by the need for designers to craft forward-thinking outfits that would remain cutting-edge by a film's release date. These styles were subsequently replicated by retailers, prompting American design to diverge from Parisian influence. For instance, the "historical" couture trends of the 1930s drew inspiration directly from Hollywood's costume creations. Notably, designer Elsa Schiaparelli created a collection based on actress Mae West's signature look. A paradigmatic example of Hollywood's influence on 1930s fashion was the white cotton organdie gown designed by Adrian and worn by Joan Crawford in the 1932 film Letty Lynton, which sparked a wave of greatly popular copies across various price ranges, with Macy's alone reportedly selling thousands of copies; paper patterns allowed home sewers to make their own versions, and even dresses that merely featured frilly sleeve details were still dubbed "Letty Lynton Style". Since then, the dress is regarded as one of the most iconic in history. In addition to Adrian, other influential Hollywood costume designers of the era included Edith Head, Travis Banton and Walter Plunkett. Despite the depth of design talent in Hollywood, several studios actively courted French fashion houses: the 1938 film Artists and Models Abroad, for instance, while credited to Edith Head at Paramount, also listed contributions from Alix, Lanvin, Lelong, Paquin, Patou, Rouff, Schiaparelli, and Worth.

Anna May Wong—the first Chinese American Hollywood star—was considered one of the best-dressed women in the world, although her outfits were unconventional, combining current Western fashions with traditional Chinese dress. She was especially associated with the cheongsam dress, which she helped popularize as a staple. Her hairstyle was also widely imitated, featuring straight-cut bangs. Wong may be considered the first fashion icon of Asian descent, and is said to have "opened the door to more inclusive standards."

==== Romanticism and surrealism ====
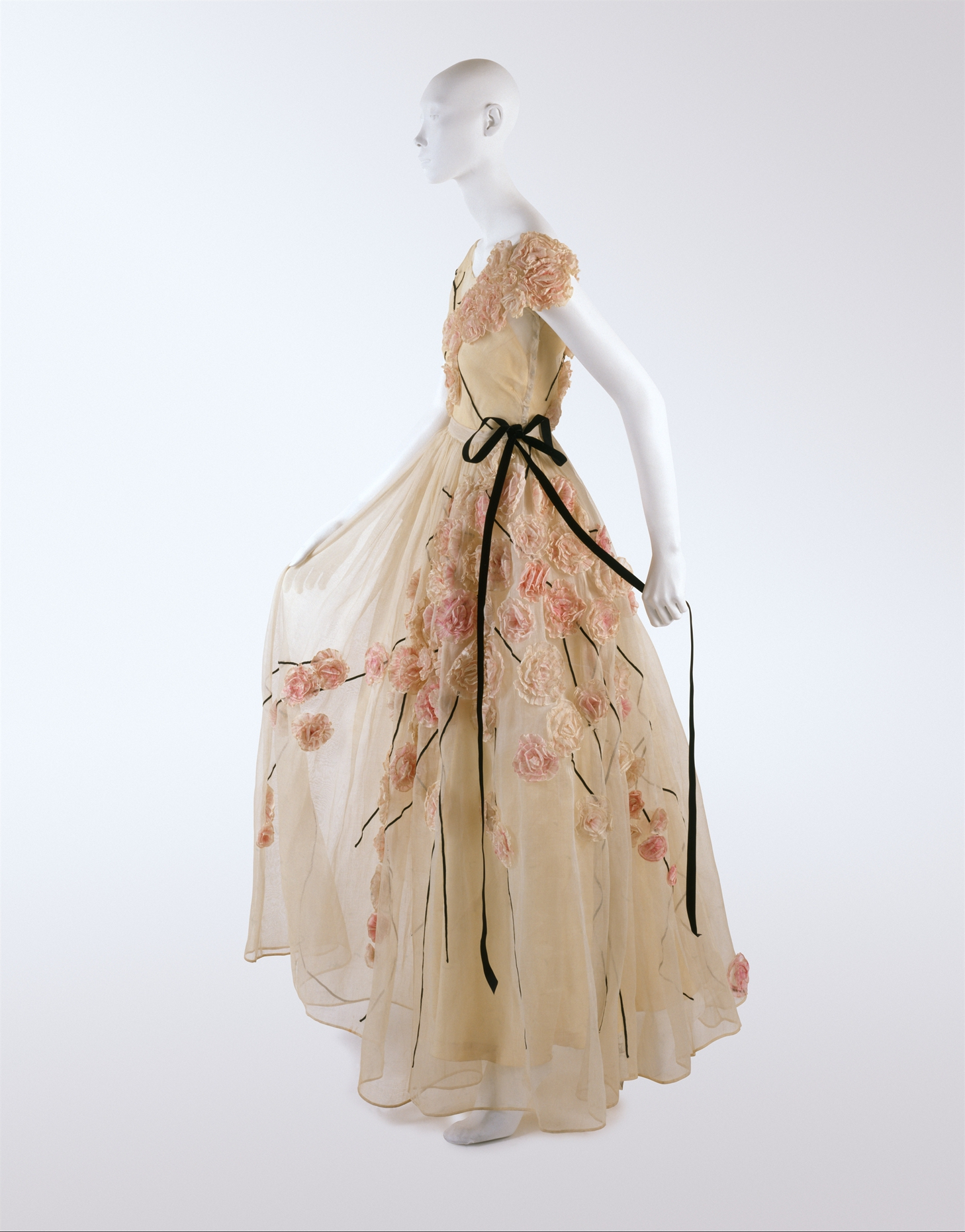
A 1937 cotton and silk gown by Jeanne Lanvin reflecting the Romantic trend.

As eveningwear leaned toward sleek, form-fitting designs, daywear fashion "returned to romanticism and femininity". Daytime dresses showcased an array of patterns—including florals, plaids, polka dots and bolder, abstract styles. These dresses featured well-defined waists and lengths that hovered between mid-calf and just above the ankle. Tailored suits, sharp and structured, gained favor with their clean lines and bold, sculpted shoulders. The dramatic shoulder, a signature of 1930s style, was achieved with padding, layered fabrics, or decorative touches, adding flair to both suits and dresses. Adrian's white gown for Joan Crawford in the 1932 film Letty Lynton—featuring striking, oversized ruffled sleeves that inspired numerous copies— is widely credited with starting the trend for "romantic nostalgia".

As noted by the Smithsonian's Fashion: The Definitive History of Costume and Style: "Robes de style (with loose bodices, dropped waists, and full skirts) had preserved prettiness and the traditional idea of femininity throughout the 1920s. Now diaphanous concoctions trimmed with an abundance of frills, ruffles, and lace became popular with those too young, too old, or not streamlined enough to squeeze their bodies into an unforgiving lamé or satin sheath." This new wave of romanticism was boosted by King George VI and Queen Elizabeth's state visit to Paris in July 1938. Known as the "White Wardrobe", the famous series of romantic gowns she wore during the visit were based on the paintings by Franz Xaver Winterhalter; according to his memoirs, Norman Hartnell, who designed the wardrobe, had been encouraged during a visit to Buckingham Palace by King George himself to look at Winterhalter's portraits of royal ancestors for inspiration. Reflecting on the romantic fashion of the 1930s, Cecil Willett Cunnington wrote in 1952: "Never has Fashion been more ironic than in this attempt to revive, for an evening dress, the modes current on the eve of the Franco-Prussian War."

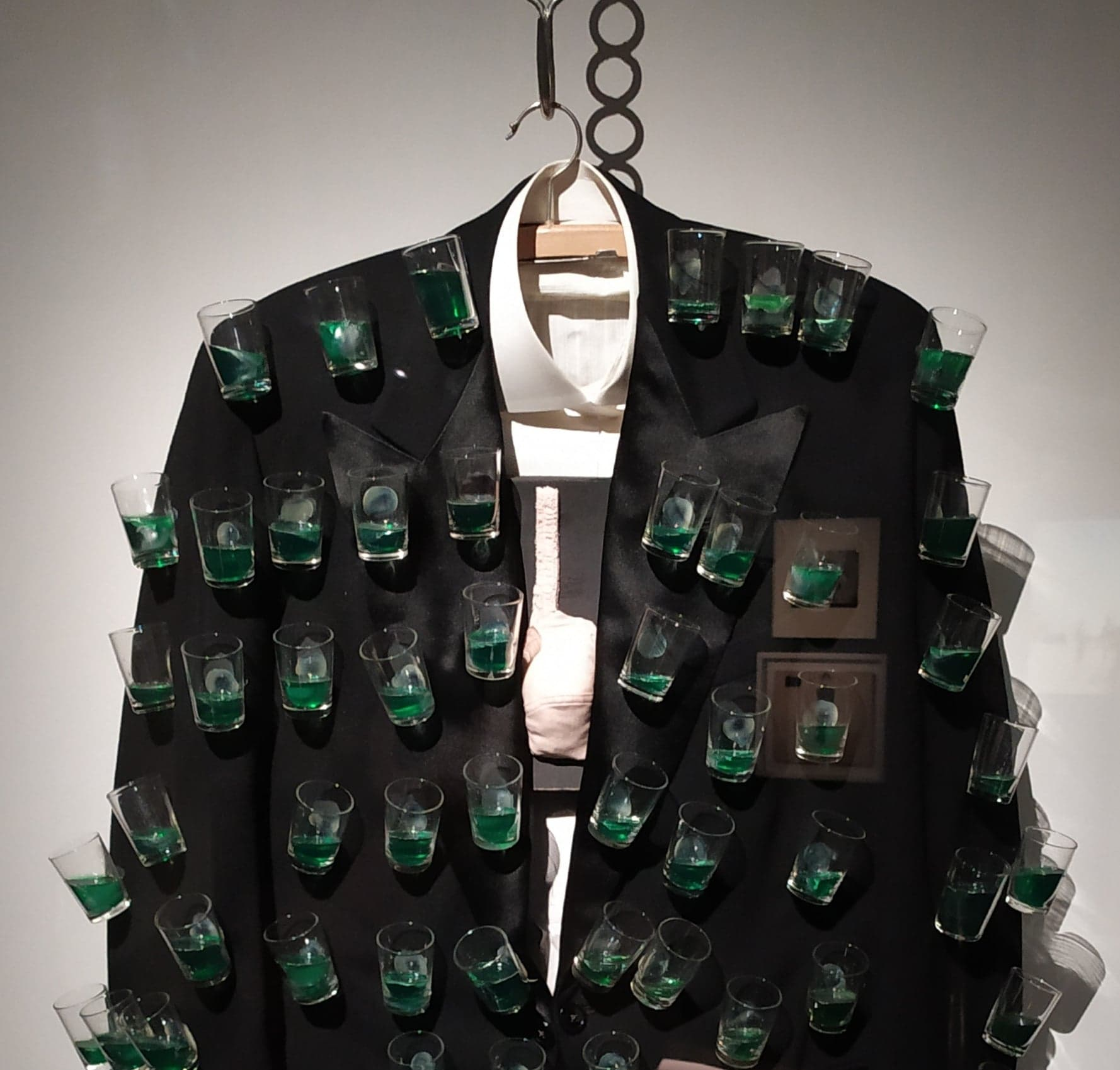
The Aphrodisiac Jacket by Salvador Dalí, 1936.

Surrealism exerted a parallel and equally distinctive influence on the decade's fashion, most fully embodied in the work of Elsa Schiaparelli, who collaborated with surrealist artists to produce some of the most provocative designs of the era. Schiaparelli was deeply engaged with the surrealist idea of ordinary objects displaced into new contexts: she used tweed for eveningwear, waterproofed taffeta for raincoats, and fashioned hats into the shapes of shoes, lamb cutlets, and inkwells. Working closely with Salvador Dalí, she created a silk evening dress printed with a large lobster motif—photographed by Cecil Beaton on Wallis Simpson shortly before her marriage to the Duke of Windsor—and another evening dress with a printed motif suggesting ripped flesh, apparently revealing a shocking pink lining beneath. Her 1936–1937 "Surrealist" suits, inspired by Dalí's paintings of figures with drawers projecting from their torsos, featured jacket pocket flaps fitted with plastic "drawer handles." Jean Cocteau designed embroidery for several of her pieces, including an evening jacket depicting a woman's profile whose hair dissolved into a cascade of sequins down one sleeve. Other collaborators included Alberto Giacometti and Meret Oppenheim. Her buttons were themselves surrealist objects—shaped as snails, cockroaches, fish, butterflies, chessmen, lollipops, and miniature trapeze artists—enlivening otherwise impeccably tailored pieces. The influence of surrealism extended to accessories: handbag designers produced bags in the form of a telephone receiver and a champagne bucket, while Schiaparelli's "Shoe Hat", designed with Dalí, resembled a high-heeled shoe worn upside down on the head.

The decade also saw a significant expansion of trousers for women. Known as "slacks," they gained visibility through the prominent media presence of actresses Katharine Hepburn and Marlene Dietrich—who wore them both on and off screen—and aviatrix Amelia Earhart. While trousers for women remained largely confined to leisure and sporting contexts and did not fully cross into mainstream daywear during the 1930s, their association with these high-profile figures helped normalize a garment that would become universal in subsequent decades.

==== Other influences ====
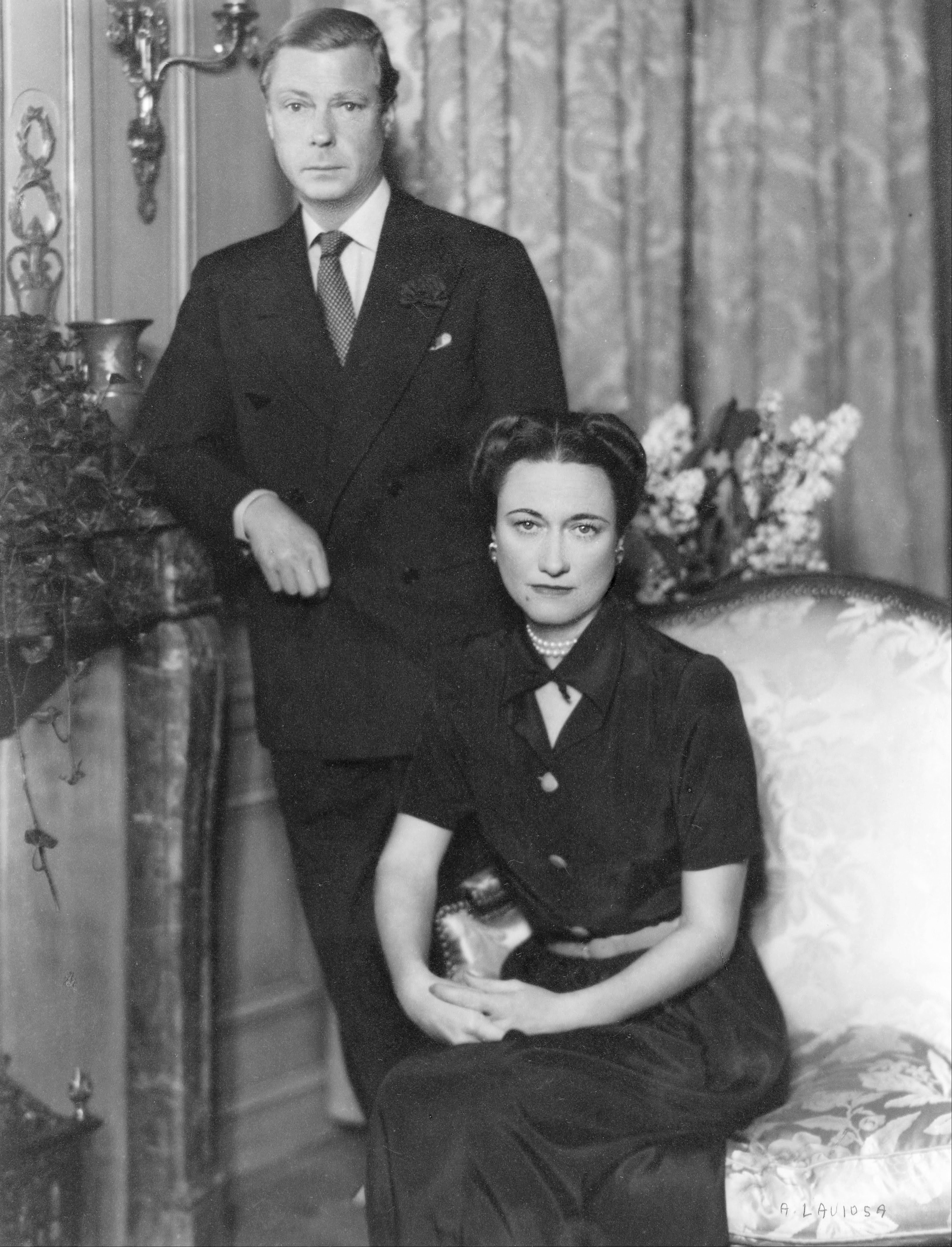
Edward and Wallis, Duke and Duchess of Windsor, c. 1934. The couple became one of the most important fashion icons of the 1930s.

In addition to the influence of Hollywood, European royalty, former royals and members of café society continued to play an important role in shaping fashion trends throughout the Western world, just as they did in the 1920s. A key figure in this sphere was Edward VIII, who ascended to the British throne on 20 January 1936 but abdicated on 11 December 1936, to marry Wallis Simpson, an American divorcée, after which they became the Duke and Duchess of Windsor following their wedding on 3 June 1937. The couple emerged as one of the most prominent fashion icons of the 1930s and were key trendsetters for the high society of the era, as their cultivation of style became a vocation amid a life of enforced leisure post-abdication. Simpson epitomized the disciplined, "hard chic" of the decade with her restrained ensembles from designers like Mainbocher, Schiaparelli, and Balenciaga, notably wearing a simple pale blue Mainbocher dress dyed to match the wedding chapel's interior for their nuptials. She was also photographed by Cecil Beaton in 1937 wearing a Schiaparelli dress, designed in collaboration with Salvador Dalí, depicting a lobster, whose placement was said to have had great sexual connotations that were seen as scandalous at the time. French designer Roland Mouret once remarked: "Love her or hate her, the world is still obsessed by that woman."

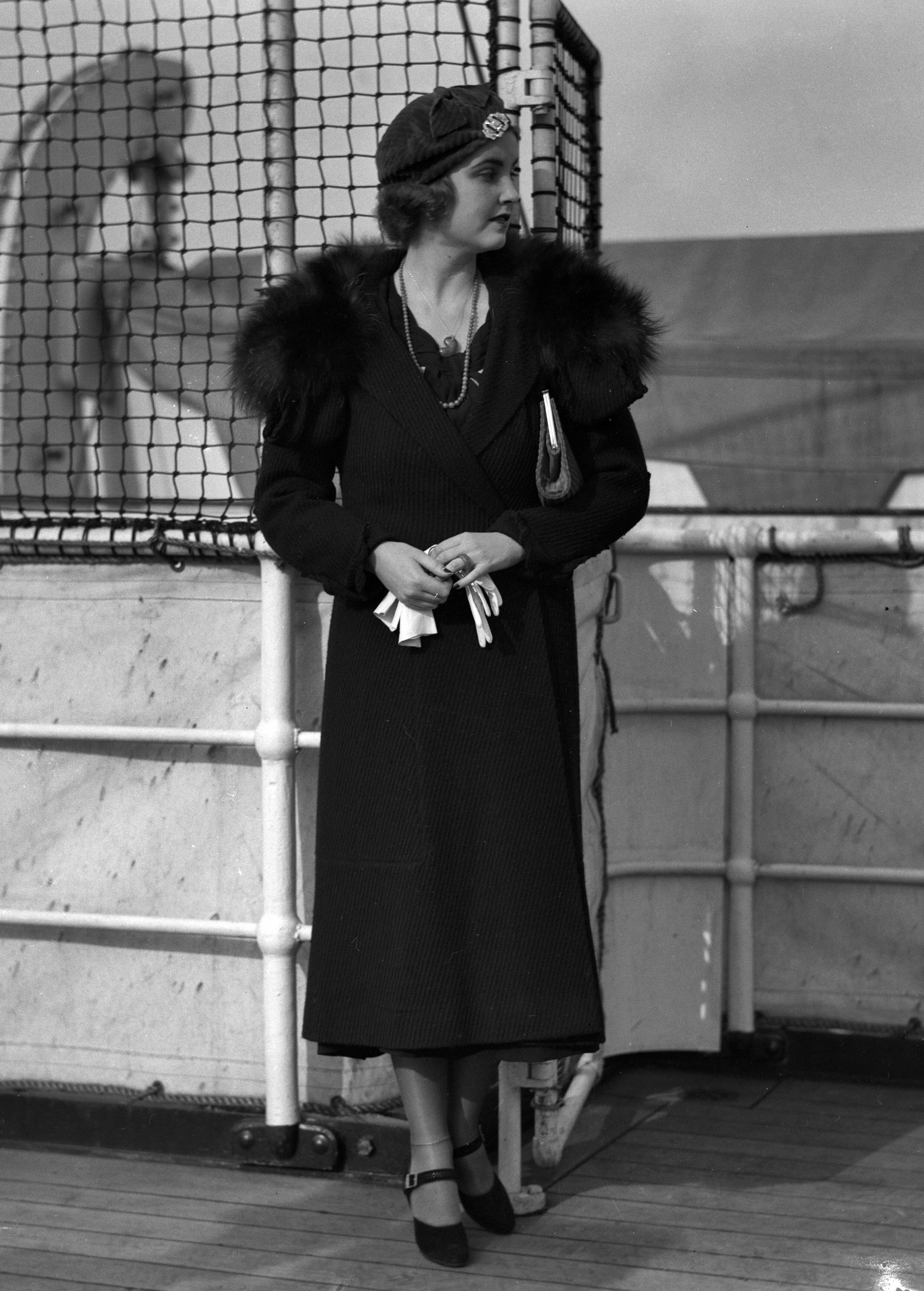
American socialite and style icon Barbara Hutton in the 1930s.

Another style icon of the decade was Daisy Fellowes, a fixture on the social scene and heiress turned Paris editor of Harper's Bazaar, who was as famous for her dazzling jewelry obsession as she was for her headline-grabbing romantic exploits. Her flair for 1930s fashion led her to champion designers like Schiaparelli, who reportedly crafted her iconic "shocking pink" in her honor, while Cartier adorned her with treasures fit for her extravagant taste. There was also Mona von Bismarck, the American socialite whose wardrobe and penchant for older suitors made her a precursor to modern celebrities. Crowned the "Best Dressed Woman in the World" in 1933 by luminaries like Chanel and Vionnet, and later enshrined in the International Best Dressed List Hall of Fame in 1958, her devotion to couture was so profound she reportedly mourned in bed for three days when Balenciaga shuttered his atelier in 1968. Another influential socialite was Barbara Hutton, heiress to the Woolworth fortune, who reigned as the ultimate "poor little rich girl", with her lavish global party-hopping and a Depression-era debutante ball cementing her notoriety. Her true legacy, however, lay in her jewelry collection—featuring jade, Cartier pieces, and a pearl necklace once worn by Marie Antoinette—a trove that outshone even her immense wealth.

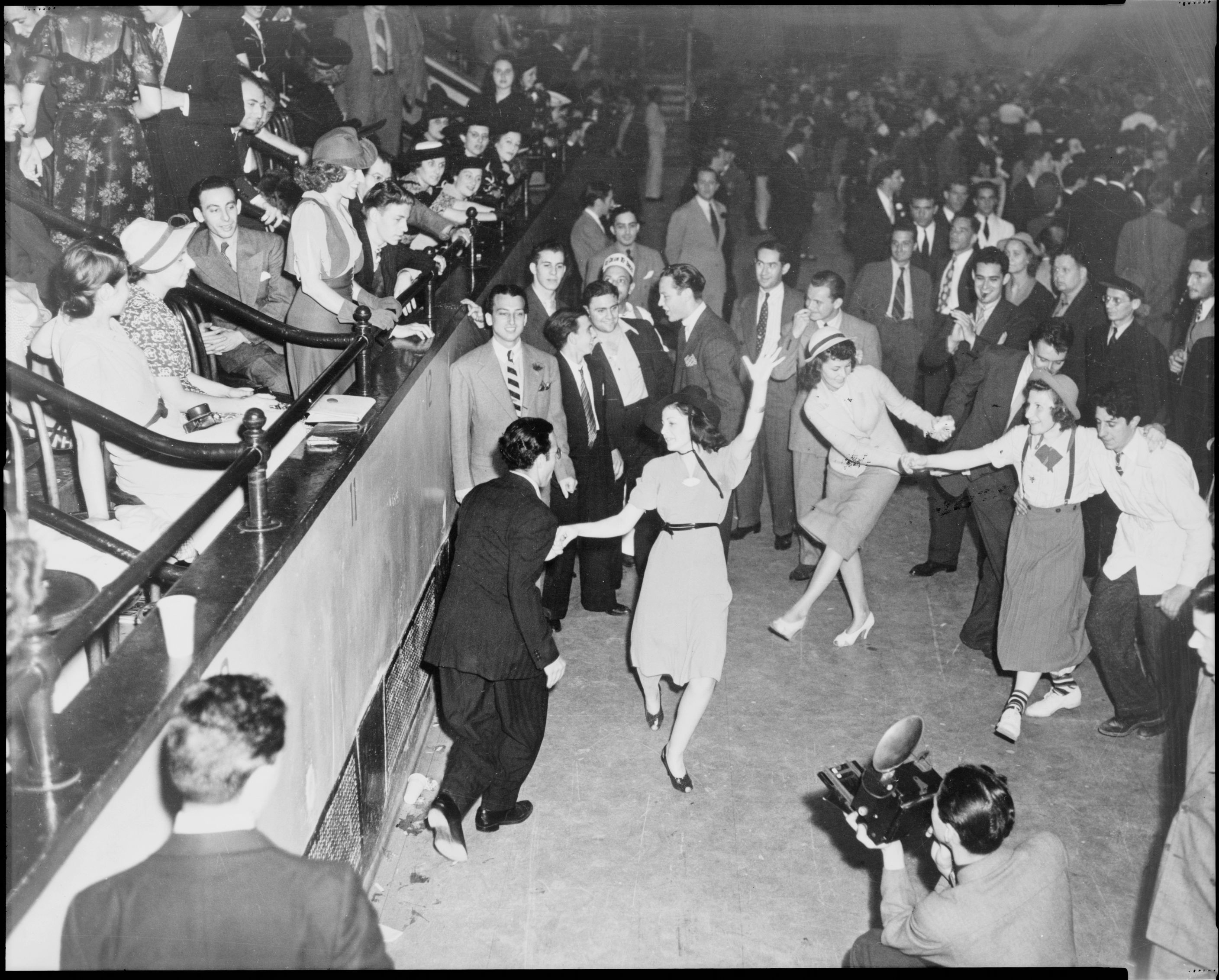
People dancing the jitterbug in New York City, 1938.

Parallel to royal influence, the repeal of Prohibition in 1933 spurred the rise of glamorous nightlife hubs in New York City, such as El Morocco, 21 and the Stork Club, alongside Harlem's Savoy Ballroom and Cotton Club, where couples danced to swing music by Duke Ellington and Count Basie. In London, society revolved around theater evenings, dinners at the Savoy Grill, and screenings at the Curzon Cinema, while Paris' international café society frequented clubs like the Le Bœuf sur le toit. Wealthy Americans and Europeans, photographed at fashionable resorts, further popularized sportswear for exclusive activities like tennis, riding, and skiing—pursuits largely inaccessible during the Great Depression. Concurrently, cruise ships offered luxurious travel to exotic destinations like India, New Zealand, and South America, promoted through evocative advertising. The public's fascination with high society extended to debutantes, whose lavish coming-out parties dominated gossip columns in the late 1930s. In London, Margaret Whigham, daughter of a rayon tycoon, was named "Deb of the Year" in 1930, while in the U.S., Woolworth heiress Barbara Hutton's 1932 debut featured four orchestras and singer Rudy Vallée. Brenda Frazier, a media favorite dubbed a "celebutante", appeared on the cover of Life magazine in 1938 and popularized the strapless evening gown.

==== End of decade styles ====
In the summer of 1939, a reporter from Vogue noted the wide variety of models offered by the leading fashion houses: "Nothing varies more than silhouette. You can look as different from your neighbour as the moon from the sun—and both of you are right. The only thing that you must have in common is a tiny waist, held in if necessary by super-light weight boned and laced corsets. There isn't a silhouette in Paris that doesn't cave in at the waist."

The greatest textile innovation of the decade was nylon, which appeared in 1939 and revolutionized hosiery.

=== Sportswear ===
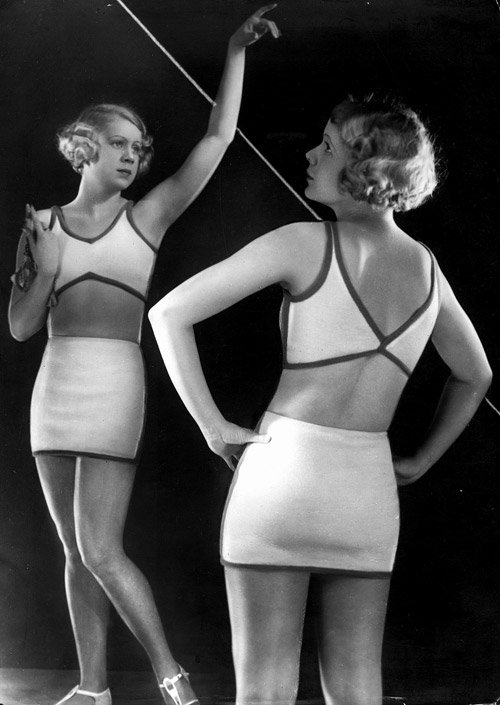
Fashion shoot for bathing suits photographed by Yva, c. 1930.

Sports continued to play a part in pushing fashion forward in the 1930s, guided by a "form follows function" principle that resulted in a pared-down, modern aesthetic. Particularly in the United States, the term sportswear became common not only for clothes worn for tennis or golf, but also for resort wear designed for travel and leisure, and for casual but stylish clothing for town and country. The term "play clothes" also came into use for leisure clothing versatile enough to transfer from the beach to the sports field or the garden. Sportswear epitomized what Americans during the Depression era invoked as the "American Way of Life": democratic, unifying, pragmatic, and versatile. On New York's Seventh Avenue, designer Claire McCardell adapted Vionnet's draped styles for ready-to-wear, developing a distinctively austere and functional aesthetic that became central to the emerging American sportswear identity.

Skiwear blossomed in the decade, reflecting the increased popularity of the sport, now accessible to more middle-class enthusiasts and encouraged by the 1932 and 1936 Winter Olympic Games. It was fully acceptable for women to wear trousers on the slopes, and skiwear styles were frequently featured in the fashion press. In the absence of specialized fabrics, ski clothing was typically made of wool, with elastic bands attached to trouser legs to prevent them from riding up. Skating clothes were also widely promoted, often in connection with profiles of Olympic champion Sonja Henie. Equestrian clothes followed trends in menswear, with women riding astride in tweed jackets.

Tennis clothes underwent a notable evolution during the decade. In April 1931, Spanish player Lili de Álvarez caused a sensation at Wimbledon by appearing in divided skirts of Schiaparelli's design, while two years later Alice Marble appeared in shorts above the knee. Women's sports clothes became notably briefer by 1934, with bathing suits slashed and backless and shorts beginning to appear regularly on the tennis court.

Swimwear developed both technically and stylistically. The elastic yarn Lastex was incorporated into swimsuits to improve fit, and suits with adjustable backs promoted tanning with fewer tan lines. Two-piece swimwear was common, with exposed midriffs but covered navels, and animal and batik-style prints appeared on woven fabrics alongside satin finishes. Reflecting the trend for celebrity endorsement, tennis star Helen Wills "designed" a line of swimwear for the BVD label. Beach pajamas—ensembles incorporating wide-legged trousers—continued to be a fashionable choice at the beach and on the yacht, with some daring women pairing them with bandeau tops or handkerchiefs folded and tied as halter tops. Amelia Earhart extended sportswear's cultural reach by designing a range for American department stores.

In England, Mary Bagot Stack founded the Women's League of Health and Beauty in 1930, with the motto "Movement is Life." The league organized mass exercise performances involving thousands of women, whose official uniform consisted of black satin shorts and a sleeveless white blouse.

=== Outerwear ===
Outerwear followed the evolving silhouette of daywear. As the decade opened, sleeker, more fitted coats were worn, often with full sleeves; as the silhouette transformed toward padded shoulders and boxier shapes by the end of the decade, outerwear changed with it, adopting shorter lengths and a wider-shouldered line. Textured fabrics such as tweed and bouclé were frequently used, and trench coats served as fashionable rainwear, as did styles made using the latest waterproof fabrics.

Mink and sealskin were especially popular for fur coats, while cloth coats often featured fur cuffs and collars of mink, leopard, or Persian lamb. The dominant fur trend of the decade, however, was the fox stole, worn draped over either a coat or a dress; large fox collars attached to coats mimicked the proportion of the popular stoles, and the practice was so widespread that dog fur was sometimes substituted at lower price points, euphemistically relabelled to suggest a more exotic origin. For evening, spectacular drapey coats were worn to coordinate with evening dresses, often trimmed with fur, while capes in both short and floor-length versions appeared in fabrics ranging from panné velvet to taffeta, and were sometimes finished with dramatic Elizabethan-inspired ruffled collars.

=== Accessories ===
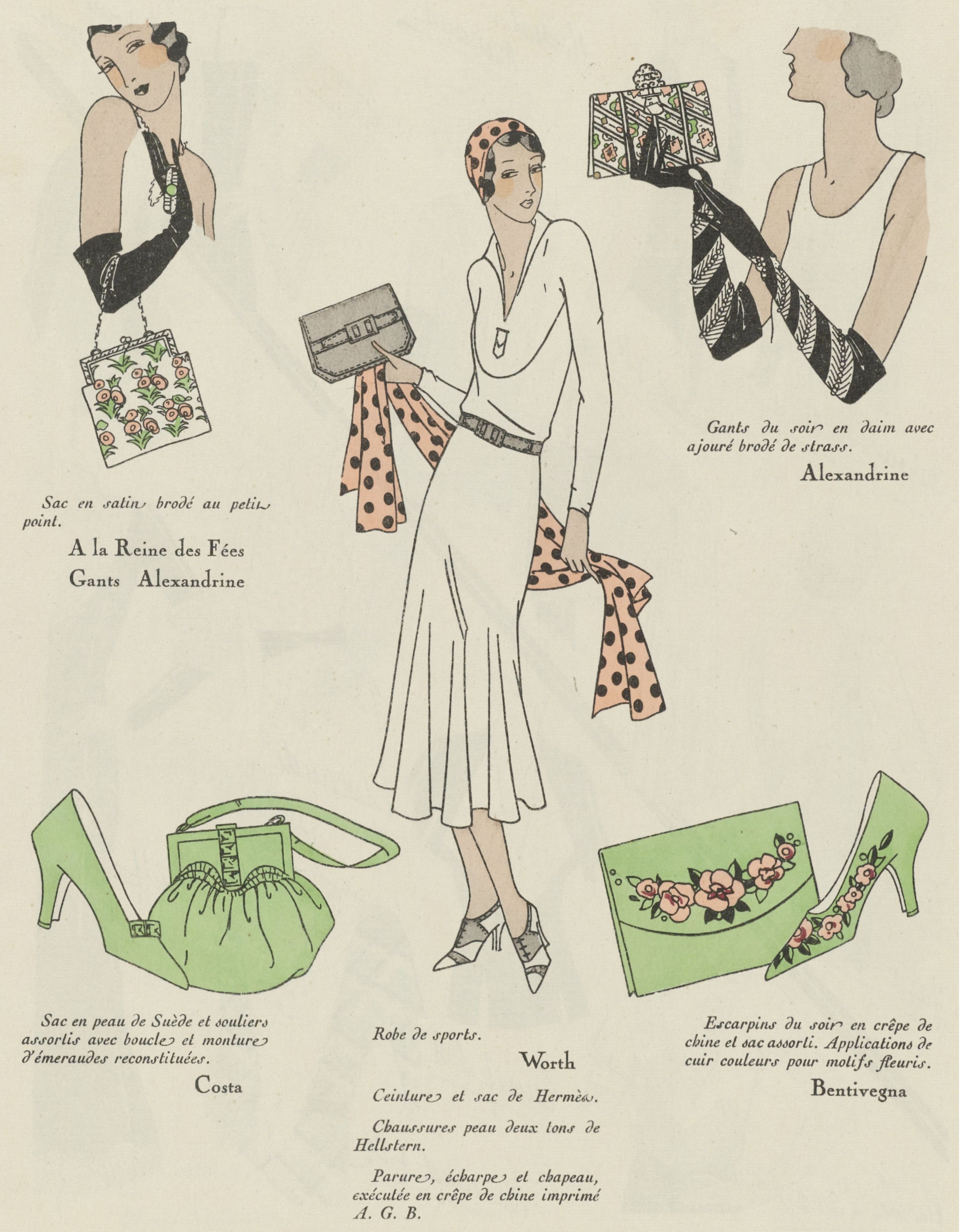
French fashion plate from 1931, displaying several accessories and featuring a dress by Worth in the center.

In the 1930s and its Great Depression context, fashion accessories were seen as an inexpensive option to elevate and modernize an existing outfit. Women under a budget could accessorize their dresses with a variety of "cheap yet glamorous ready-made articles such as diamanté dress clips, bracelets, brooches and necklaces, embroidered handbags, furs, fancy footwear and modern hats, that were available in great variety from most catalogue companies." Gloves were also a central element of a fashionable look; elbow-length models were used to accompany evening dresses, while short or opera-length styles, made of fabric or leather, were chosen for daytime attire. Buttons were also of great importance and were generally large or of decreasing size, some featuring surrealist motifs (like cicadas, butterflies and dragonflies), and others made of fabric matching the patterns on the dresses. Manufacturers and retailers launched matching sets of hats, gloves, bags, and shoes in bold colors. Handbags of the 1930s remained similar to those of the 1920s; at the beginning of the decade beaded or enamelled mesh models were popular, while at the end of the decade the use of leather became increasingly widespread. Minaudières—small decorative cases, sometimes fitted with matching containers for cosmetics and cigarettes—were widely carried as evening bags. Hermès introduced their carrés, printed silk squares often produced in limited editions, contributing to the development of the luxury scarf as a fashion staple.

Hats were a vital element of a woman's wardrobe in the decade, and thus received more editorial coverage than any other type of accessory. The 1930s marked the end of the dominance of the tight-fitting, deep-crowned cloche hats that defined the previous decade, being replaced with a wide variety of designs. Vogue magazine declared 1931 as the "Great Hat Year" because of the variety of novel models and the fact that "they were a considerable factor in stemming the tide of depression that was another phenomenon of that momentous year." The choice of headgear allowed women to update or add formality to an outfit, as well as reflect their personality. Hollywood stars were a major influence in popularizing new hat styles, especially Greta Garbo and Marlene Dietrich. The Gilbert Adrian-designed hat worn by Garbo in the 1930 film Romance, known as the Empress Eugénie hat, "set off a nation-wide buying craze, as did the wide-brimmed slouch hat that Garbo would wear to hide her face."

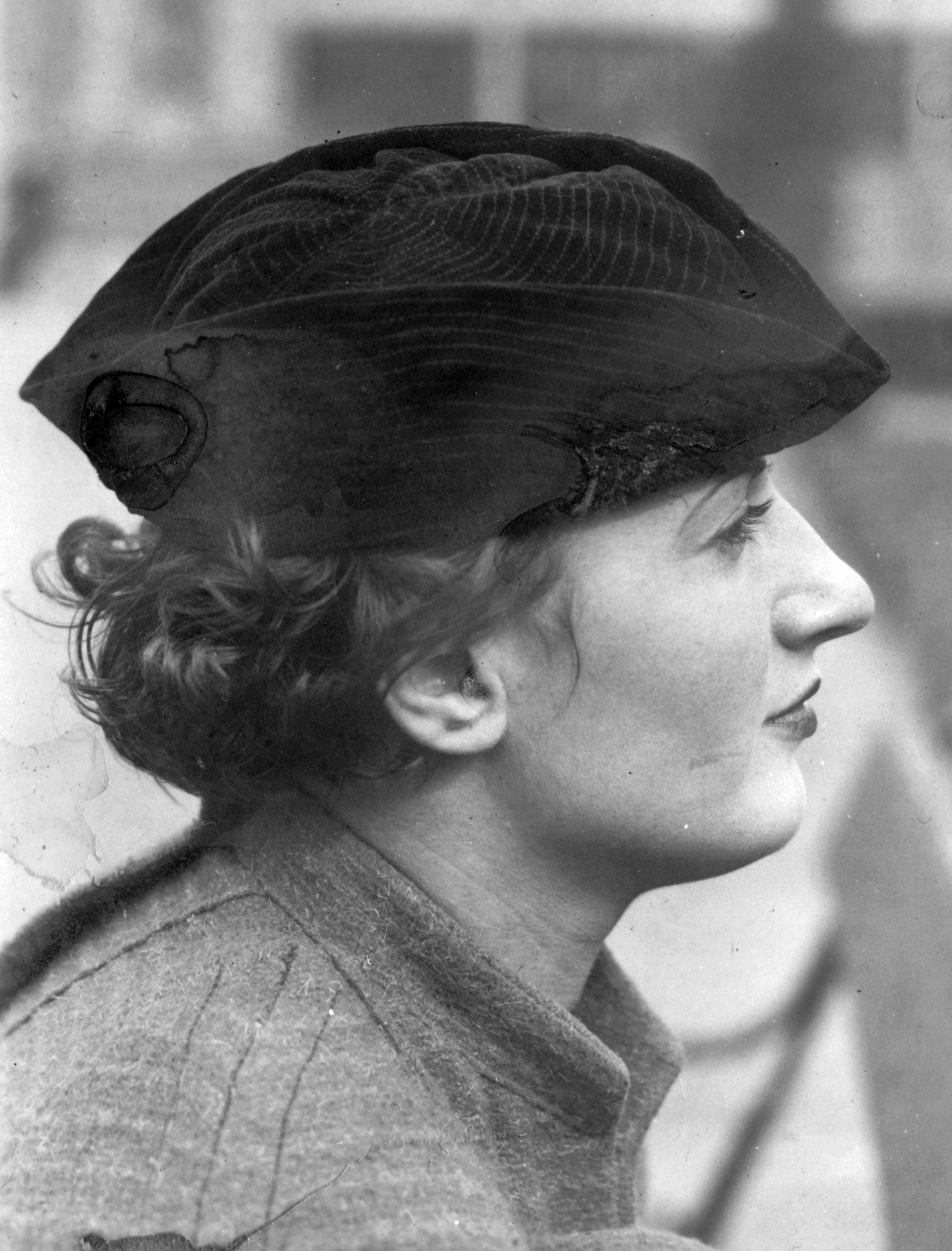
A woman portrayed in Budapest, 1935.

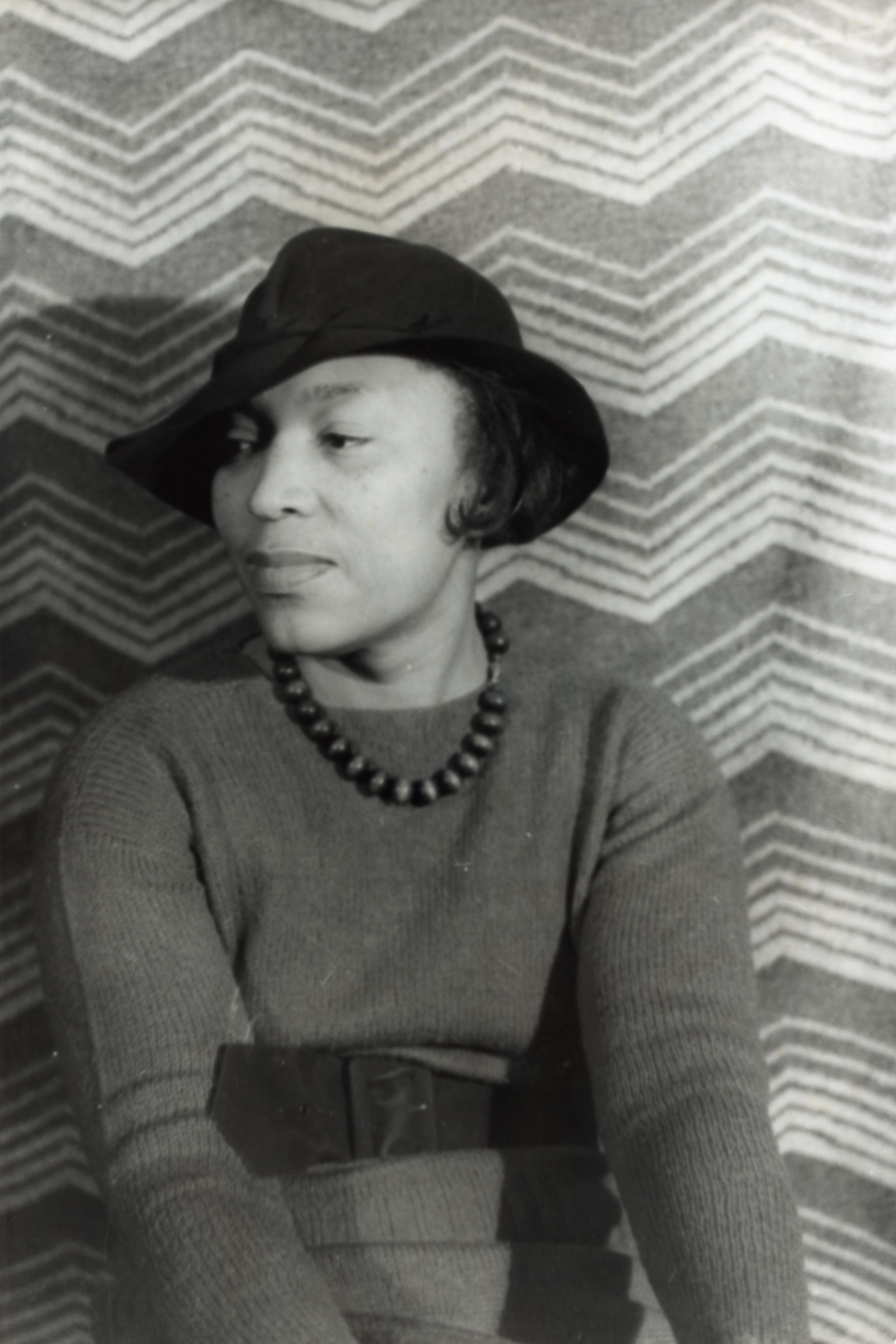
Writer Zora Neale Hurston, 1938.

An important trend in women's headgear of the 1930s was the influence of masculine styles, with a variety of designs worn in different positions and angles on the head and face.

To complement the new "diagonalistic" and body-hugging shapes of the fashionable bias-cut clothing, various styles of hats were designed to be worn at different angles over the head and forehead, evoking the movement of the gowns as well as some styles of men's hats. As noted by Colleen Hill: "By the early 1930s, newly 'masculine' hat styles began to make regular appearances in fashion editorials. Sometimes resembling a man's bowler, other times paying closer homage to the fedora, they shared a quality of casual elegance, and could be paired with almost any daytime ensemble. (...) Rarely were any of these hats mere copies of menswear styles, however. Although not as severely modern as the cloche, their intricate folds, tucks, and stitching techniques were fresh and subtly complex." Although no single initiator of this trend can be identified, as early as the 1920s several manufacturers of men's felt hats began to offer models for women in response to the popularity of cloche hats. By 1936, a noticeable shift occurred in hat trends, as the once prevalent simple, masculine styles made room for designs boasting strikingly different silhouettes. Fashion editorials showcased hats with exaggerated crowns, some lavishly adorned with draped fabrics or intricate trimmings, while others seamlessly integrated elements of earlier streamlined designs with the fresh silhouette.

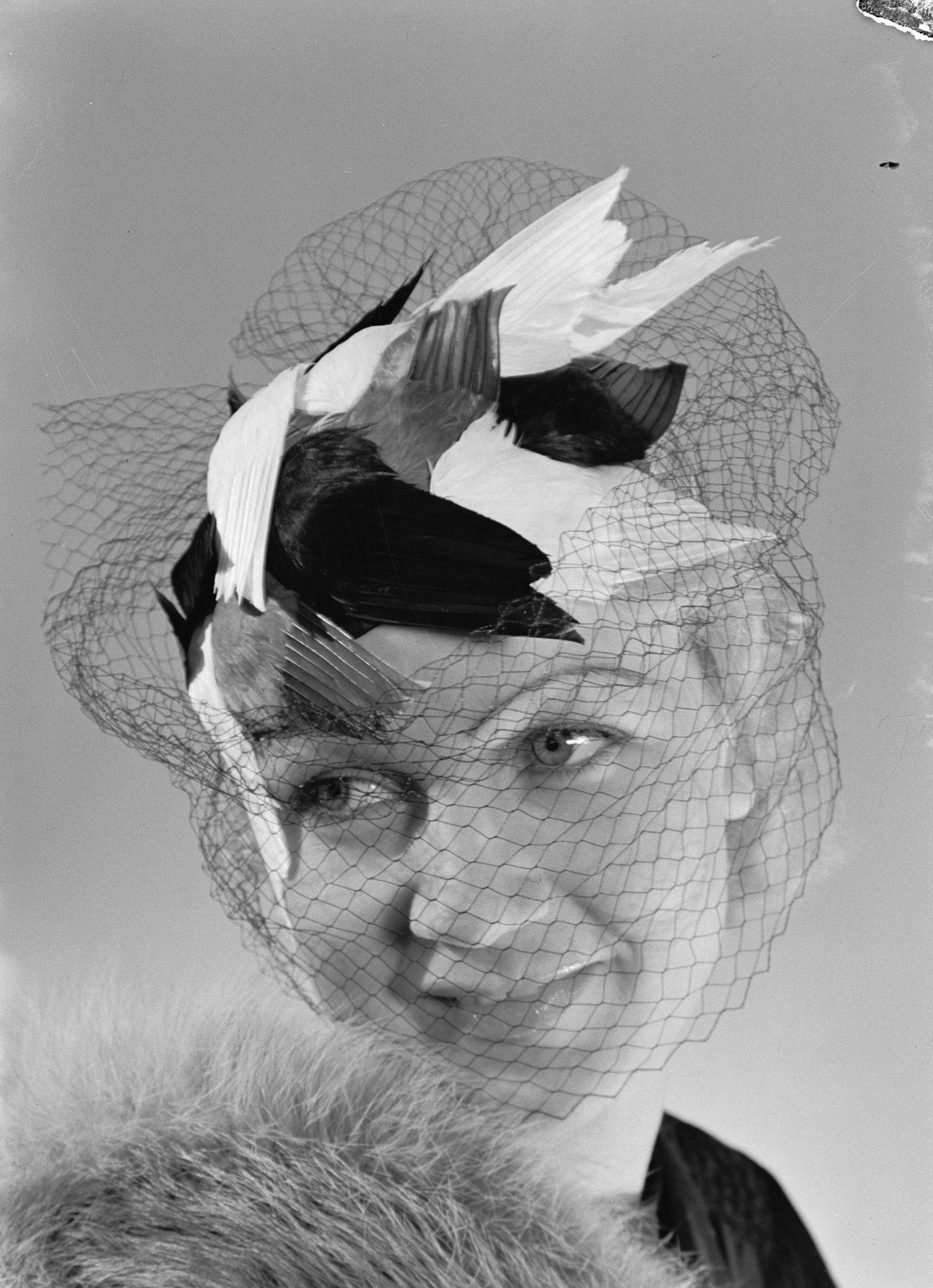
A hat model from a 1936 Parisian fashion shoot. The decade saw the return of feather and flower embellishments, veils, and the emergence of surrealist designs.

The 1930s saw the return of trimmings such as flowers and feathers in millinery after their near-disappearance in the second half of the 1920s. Nevertheless, they were "markedly simpler than the elaborate embellishments seen on hats prior to World War I." The decade also marked the emergence of prominent American milliners such as Lilly Daché, Mr. John and Sally Victor, who appeared in fashion magazines alongside French designers. Mr. John designed various iconic hats for Hollywood films, notably a veiled cloche worn by Dietrich in Shanghai Express—which made veils popular nationwide—and the famous cartwheel hat worn by Vivien Leigh in Gone with the Wind (1939). However, the designer who most epitomized the 1930s was Schiaparelli. Some of her most emblematic designs of the decade were the "Mad Cap", which consisted of a "simple knitted cap that could be twisted into a variety of shapes"; and her 1935 doll hat, which "perched whimsically on the front of the head and was secured by a band, elastic, or a snood" that "covered and contained the hair on the back of the head". Schiaparelli was known for often incorporating surrealist influences into her headgear designs, such as hats in the shape of inkwells, baskets of flowers or lamb chops. One of her most iconic designs was the "Shoe Hat" made in collaboration with the surrealist Salvador Dalí, which "looked like a high-heeled shoe worn upside down on the head." The influence of Schiaparelli's surrealism was picked up by Hollywood, such as in the "tower" hat worn by Garbo in Ninotchka (1939).

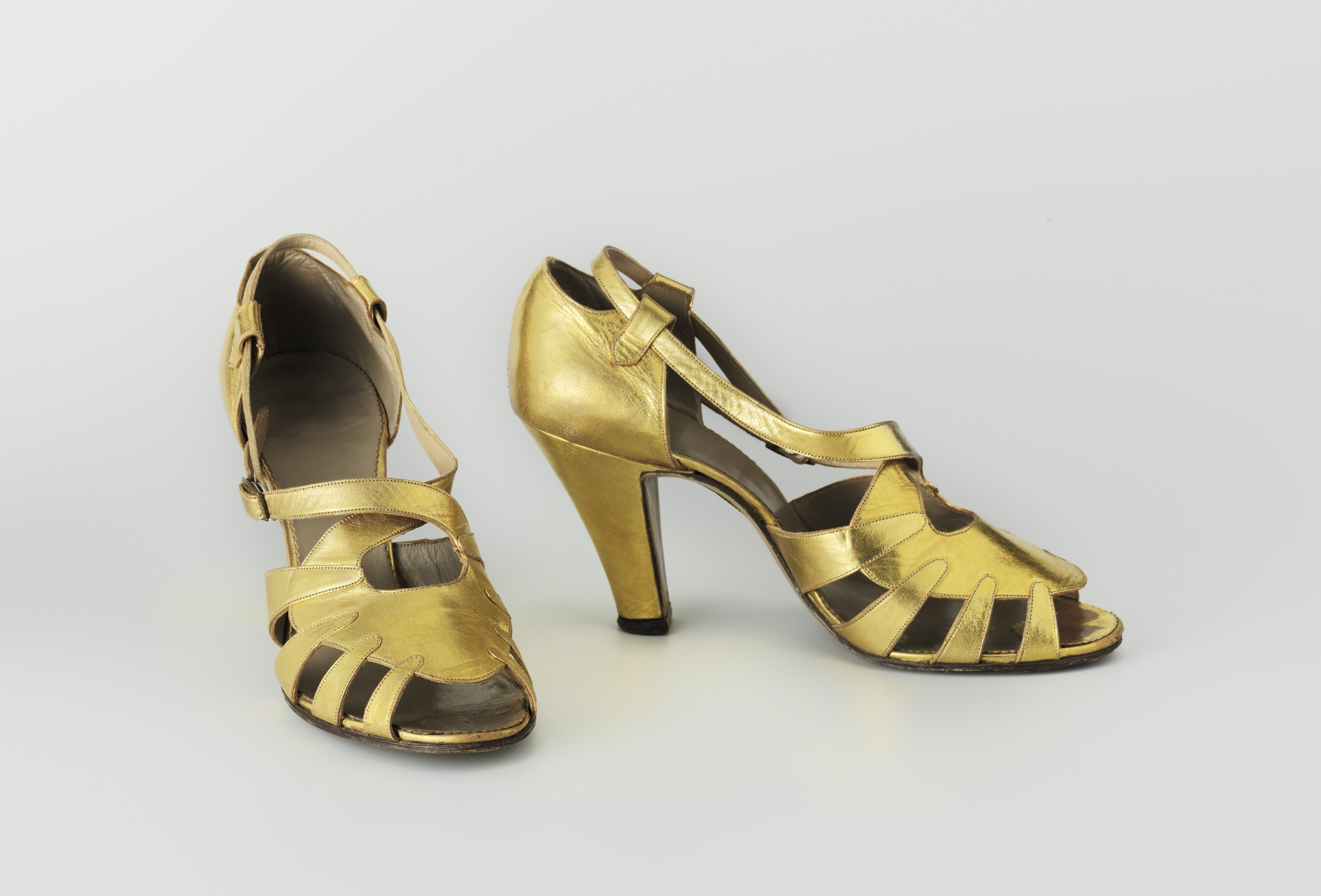
A pair of gold-plated leather sandals, c. 1937–1940.

The 1930s featured a wide variety of shoe and heel shapes to choose from, especially by the end of the decade, ranging from flats and pumps to lace-ups, ankle-straps, and models with buckles. In addition, the early 1930s marked the arrival of low-heeled "Spectator" brogues and other styles of two-toned shoes. Strapless opera pumps became more common for daily use, replacing shoes with straps. Despite this shift, "sandals" (strap-adorned pumps) were still worn for summer and dancing. Decorative elements often included contrasting color piping or metallic leather. Practical daywear options included high vamp shoes known as "slip-ons" or "step-ins," and lace-up styles called Oxfords. The introduction of wedge heels and open-toe styles foreshadowed the trends of 1940s fashion. The late 1930s also saw the introduction of the platform shoe, credited to Italian designer Salvatore Ferragamo.

Spectacular brooches in the shape of animals or flowers served as a focal point for simple dresses and daytime suits—a style particularly favored by the Duchess of Windsor. The crystalline vocabulary of Art Deco continued to influence jewelry design, with earrings sometimes resembling skyscrapers; bangles and charm bracelets were popular, as were strands of pearls wrapped around the wrist, sometimes even over gloves, and diamanté buckles and dress clips frequently adorned evening dress.

=== Hair and cosmetics ===
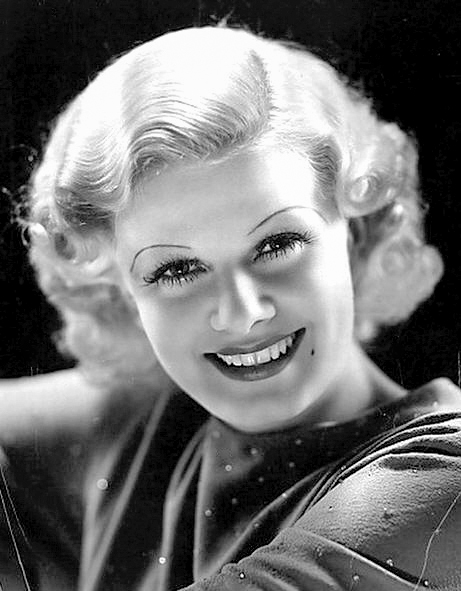
Jean Harlow sporting the typical beauty trends of the early 1930s.

The 1930s saw a rise in makeup and the beauty industry, spurred in part by Hollywood's film industry, which led to a growing abundance of cosmetics, such as perfumes and nail polishes, becoming more widely available. Inexpensive products such as Maybelline cake mascara and Tangee lipstick brought glamour within reach of the mass market, and Vogue advised its readers that "when you can't go to a party in a new dress, you do your hair in a new way." This allowed women to copy their favorite movie stars at a small cost, as Cally Blackman noted: "Every woman could imitate and buy into, at relatively little cost, the look of her favourite stars, if only through copying their makeup and hairstyles: cinema democratized the empire of fashion by making glamour accessible." During the decade, beauty salons became an "integral part of a woman's ritual of beauty". Embracing the growing fashion for exercise and wellness, cosmetic companies like Elizabeth Arden expanded their services for women in the 1930s to also include fitness studios within the beauty salons.

The androgynous style popular among women in the 1920s, characterized by short, cropped hair, gave way in the 1930s to longer locks that were increasingly styled in elegant updos as the decade progressed. The predominant style in the early 1930s consisted of short hair styled with soft waves. With movie stars known for their striking hair color, dyeing became less covert; platinum blonde was particularly fashionable, a look especially associated with Jean Harlow, who bleached her hair weekly and inspired a widespread fashion for the style, with an indirect influence on the sale of peroxide. A defining beauty trend of the era was pencil-thin eyebrows, which were either heavily plucked to form a line or removed altogether and drawn on with pencil.

In the 1930s, makeup was much softer and more natural than the "vampy" style of the 1920s, especially around the eyes, abandoning the dramatic, dark, kohl-rimmed eyes sported by silent movie stars. Instead, women applied a range of colors over and just beyond the lid, with the palette of the period consisting of blues, greens and even shimmery golds and silvers. Rouge also took on a more subdued role, shifting away from the stark pale skin and bold, circular cheek color favored by flappers in the 1920s; it was instead applied lightly to sculpt the face with gentle contours and a soft flush, creating a vibrant, healthy glow that echoed the decade's focus on vitality and wellness. Meanwhile, a tanned complexion started to gain popularity, inspired by Coco Chanel's influence. The small rosebud-shaped lips of the 1920s gave way to the 1930s' more natural lip shape, painted in a range of colors that included strong reds as well as lighter, more neutral tints. From the 1920s onward, mascara emerged as a key tool in a woman's makeup collection; during the 1930s it was available as a solid block paired with a brush, as liquid mascara did not make its debut until the 1950s. Nail polish was typically applied to match the colors of the makeup on the face, and the "moon manicure" was a popular design during the era, in which either the tip or "moon" of the nail or both remained unpainted.

=== Undergarments ===
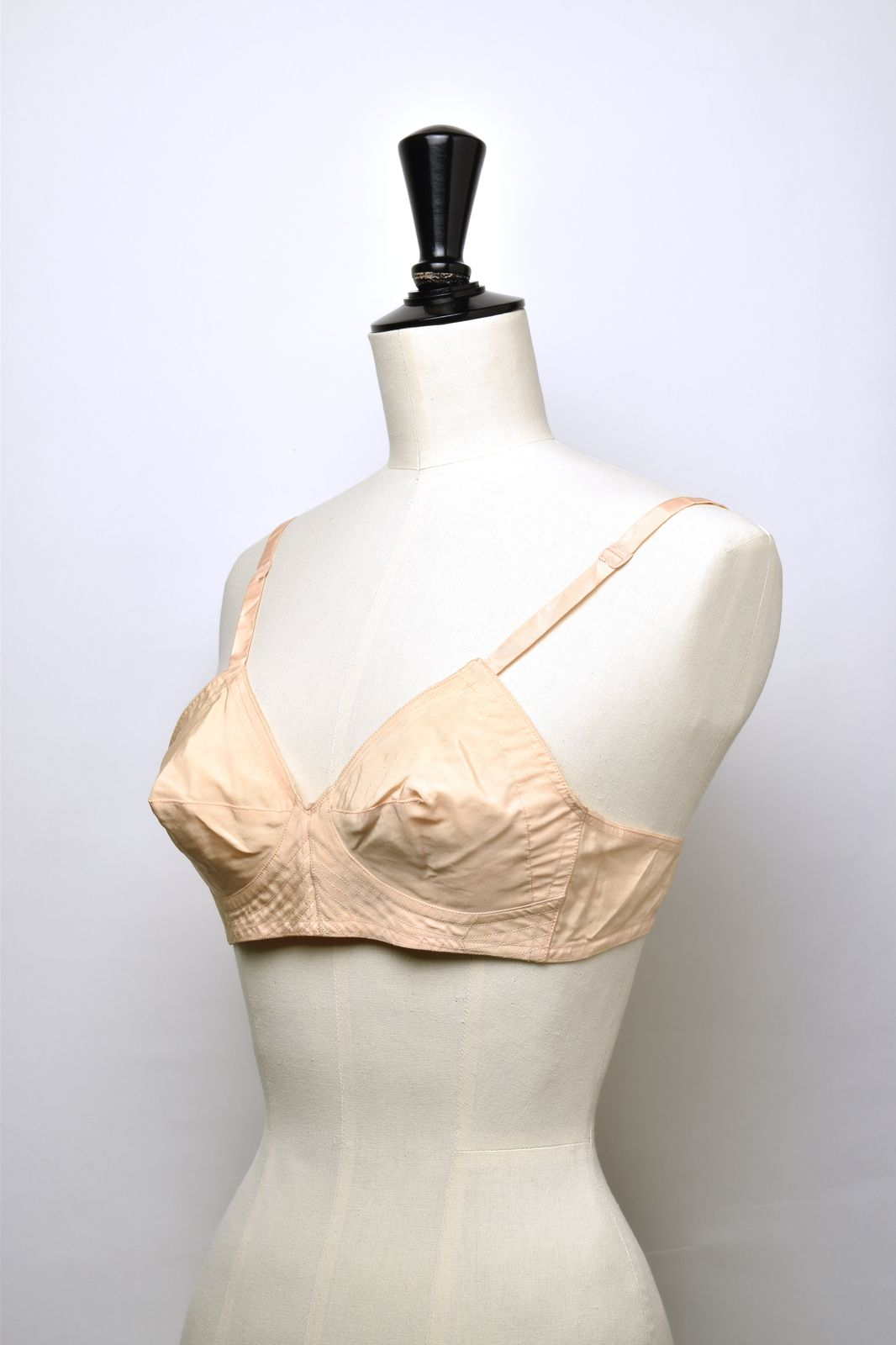
A 1930s light pink rayon bra with satin adjustable straps. During the decade, the bra evolved to its current form.

The 1930s marked a transformative period in the history of women's undergarments, reflecting both technological advancements and shifting cultural ideals of femininity and bodily aesthetics. Emerging from the 1920s, when the fashionable silhouette favored a slender, almost boyish figure with minimal bust emphasis, the new decade ushered in a preference for a structured, uplifted, and separated bust, fundamentally altering the purpose and design of undergarments. Initially patented in 1914, the brassière—a word already in circulation by the early 1900s—truly evolved during the decade. This shift saw the brassière—often shortened to "bra" by the mid-1930s—evolve from a simple flattening device into a garment designed to lift and shape the breasts, a change driven by designers' focus on accentuating the upper torso through innovative neckline details and longer hemlines that redirected attention upward. The term "bra" gained widespread acceptance, with a 1934 Harper's Bazaar survey noting its prevalence among college women, signaling a linguistic and cultural consolidation of this new undergarment identity.

Technological innovation played a critical role in this evolution, as the 1930s introduced materials like man-made fibers, durable elastics, and notably Lastex—a rubber-based thread developed by Dunlop chemists, extruded into fine filaments and wrapped in cotton, silk, or rayon to enhance comfort and elasticity. Lastex revolutionized bras and girdles, offering flexibility and support without the heavy boning of previous decades, aligning with the decade's demand for garments that accommodated increased physical activity, such as the energetic dance styles of the Lindy Hop and Quickstep popular in the era's dance halls. By 1938, nylon emerged as another groundbreaking material, initially used in toothbrushes but soon adopted for bras, stockings, and other undergarments due to its strength and lightweight properties, with its commercial application in stockings debuting in 1940. Alongside these material advancements, standardization in sizing emerged: in 1932, bras began to be categorized into A, B, C, and D cups with numerical band sizes (e.g., 34, 36, 38), while Maidenform introduced a sizing system based on breast volume in ounces, improving fit precision and comfort.

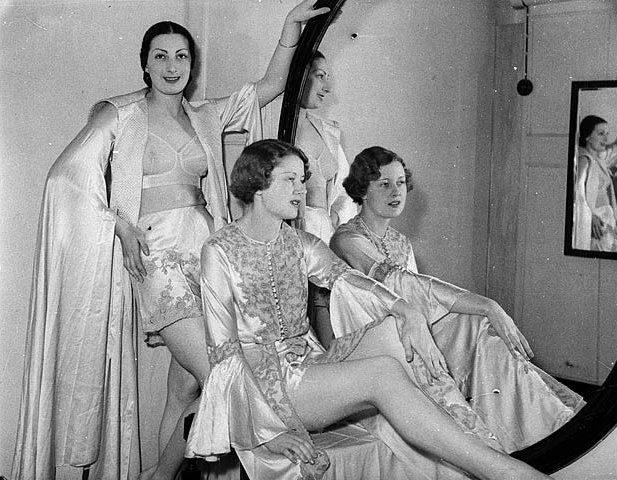
A fashion show for women's undergarments in Sydney, 1936.

The bra's design also progressed significantly, with the introduction of structured cups—often triangular or conical—crafted from bias-cut fabric or stabilized by "whirlpool stitching", a technique of concentric topstitching that eliminated under-cup seams and enhanced adaptability to individual breast shapes. This focus on lift and separation contrasted sharply with the 1920s bust-suppressing styles like the Symington side lacer, reflecting a broader rejection of the androgynous flapper ideal in favor of a more defined feminine silhouette. Bras became essential for complementing the decade's fashion trends, such as higher-waisted dresses and bias-cut evening gowns, which demanded smooth contours and nicely shaped breasts. Specialty designs also appeared, including bras with versatile straps to suit low-backed or shoulder-baring dresses, catering to the elegance of 1930s evening wear.

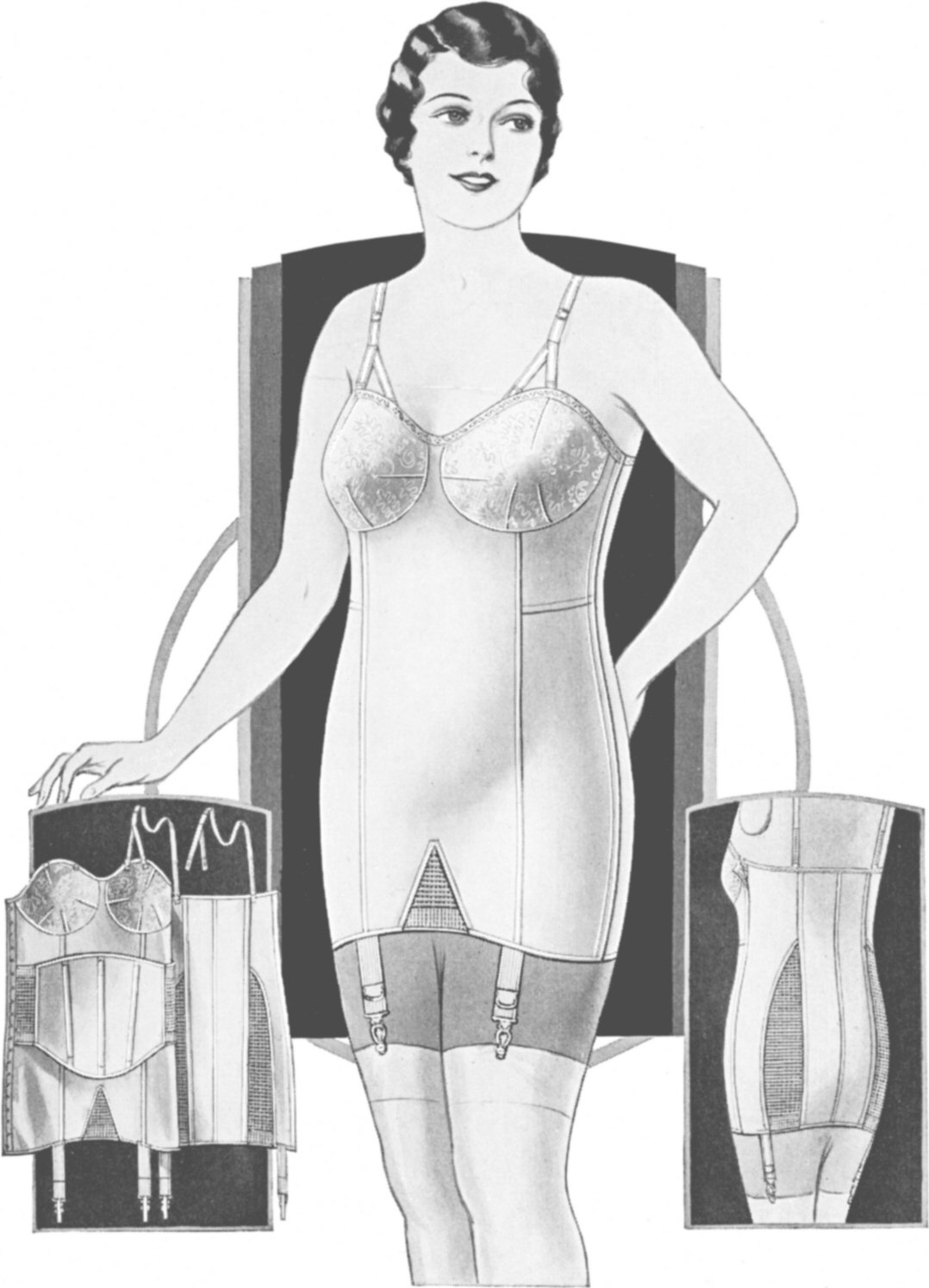
Illustrations for a brassiere and girdle ensemble in an American mail order catalogue, 1933.

Beyond bras, women's undergarments in the 1930s encompassed a range of foundation garments designed to sculpt the figure beneath the decade's lean yet shapely ideal. Girdles, resembling snug skirts that extended over the stomach and buttocks, replaced the rigid corsets of earlier eras for many women, leveraging Lastex and two-way stretch elastic to smooth the silhouette without cumbersome fasteners. For those requiring more robust support, corselettes—boned garments extending from the shoulders to the upper thighs—offered comprehensive shaping of the bust, stomach, and hips. Circular knitting machines further enabled the production of seamless girdles, enhancing comfort and practicality, while slide closures in foundations reflected additional mechanical ingenuity. Slips remained a staple, worn over other undergarments to eliminate visible lines, though some featured built-in bras or control panels for a sleeker effect.

Pant styles diversified as well, with bloomers retaining their high elastic waists and above-the-knee length from the 1920s, while step-in panties offered a looser fit with flared legs varying from brief to mid-thigh, and briefs provided a closer-fitting, high-waisted option extending just past the buttocks. Stockings, typically made of silk or rayon until nylon's 1939 introduction, were worn in skin-tone shades or with decorative clocks and patterns, their sizing refined to match the mid-calf hemlines of daywear. Meanwhile, camisoles, tap pants, and wide-legged silky pajamas catered to both practical and leisurely needs, the latter doubling as loungewear and influencing outer fashion with their boudoir aesthetic.

Economically, the Great Depression shaped undergarment consumption, yet bra sales surged despite widespread unemployment, reflecting their affordability—Sears, Roebuck catalogs in 1935 offered bras for as little as $0.14 compared to $4–$6 corsets—and their role in maintaining a groomed appearance during trying times. This accessibility contrasted with the 1920s, when corset sales had declined by a third between 1920 and 1928 as bras gained traction, a trend accentuated in the 1930s by the bra's newfound prominence. For wealthier women or those embracing minimalism, some forwent undergarments entirely beneath soft, bias-cut evening wear to achieve a neoclassical silhouette free of visible lines, though most relied on foundations to meet fashion's exacting standards.

== Men's fashion ==
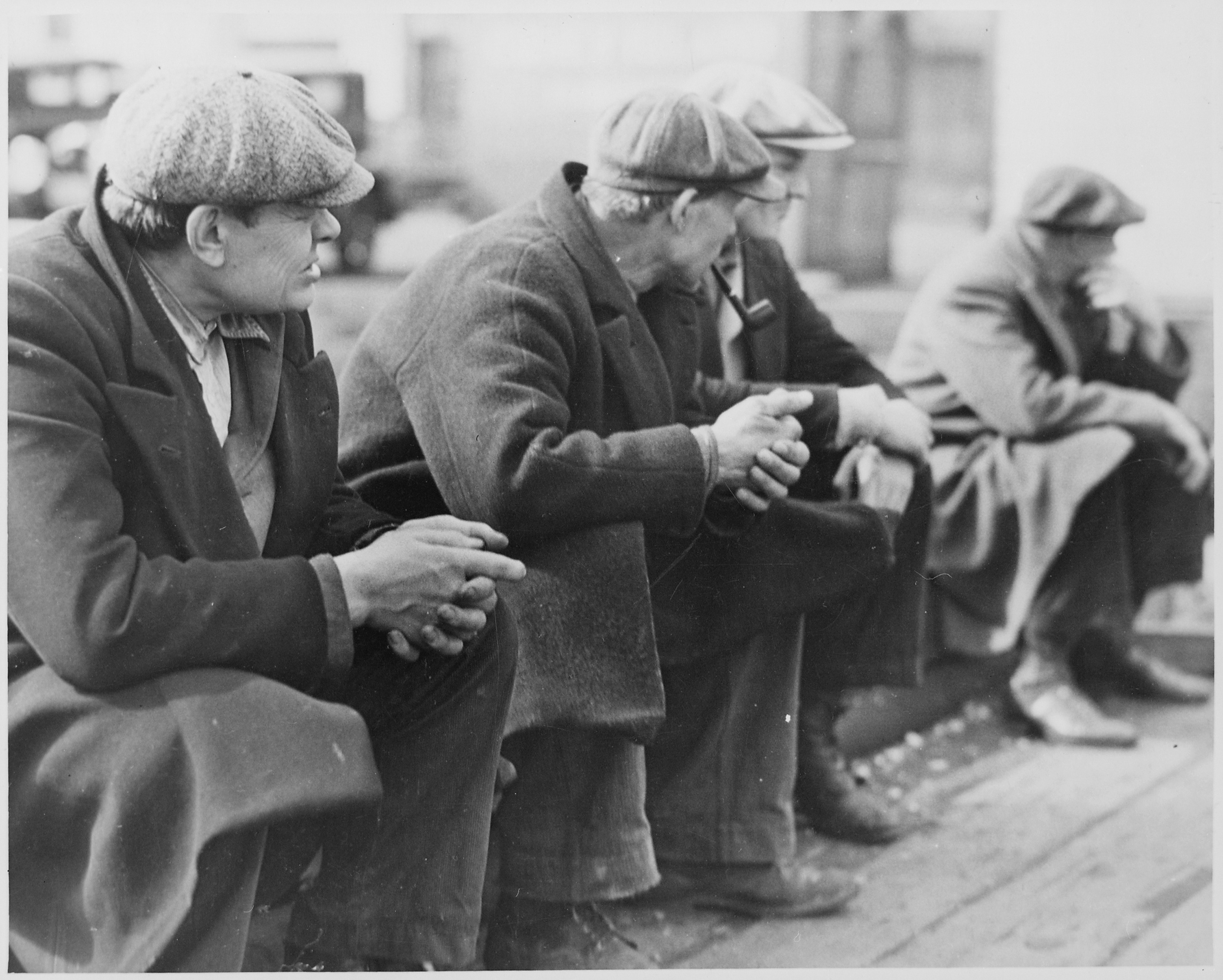
A row of men looking for jobs in New York City, 1935. They wear worn-out boots, large overcoats and a flat cap, a typical men's outfit during the Great Depression, when this was the only fashion many could afford.

In the 1930s, Savile Row tailoring continued to dominate menswear trends. Matching the shift in womenswear's silhouettes, men's suits "were worn with semi-accentuated waists", with a slimmed-down silhouette that contrasted the looser, baggy fits of the 1920s. Edward VIII, then Prince of Wales, was a major fashion icon in menswear, epitomizing the English style. English conservative politician Anthony Eden was also a fashion leader, with his trademark look consisting of a white linen waistcoat worn with a lounge suit and his signature silk-brimmed homburg hat, which became known as "the Anthony Eden".

The male physique ideal of the decade called for wide shoulders, a prominent chest, and narrow hips—an athletic silhouette that tailoring sought to enhance. The master of the flattering cut was the London tailor Frederick Scholte, who took as his model the scarlet coats worn by members of the Household Cavalry and distilled their three defining characteristics—narrow waists, wide shoulders, and roomy armholes—into a loosely constructed jacket with a full chest and a defined waist. This style came to be known as the "English drape" and was promoted by Savile Row tailors Anderson & Sheppard. Double-breasted coats with peaked lapels and striped suiting were popular choices that further helped achieve the desired athletic silhouette. Trousers were high-waisted and cut with pleats in front; trouser legs were frequently wide and often featured cuffs, while the dark evening tuxedo dominated formal wear and the white dinner jacket gained popularity for warm nights and resort areas. Neckties were frequently striped and geometric, often unlined.

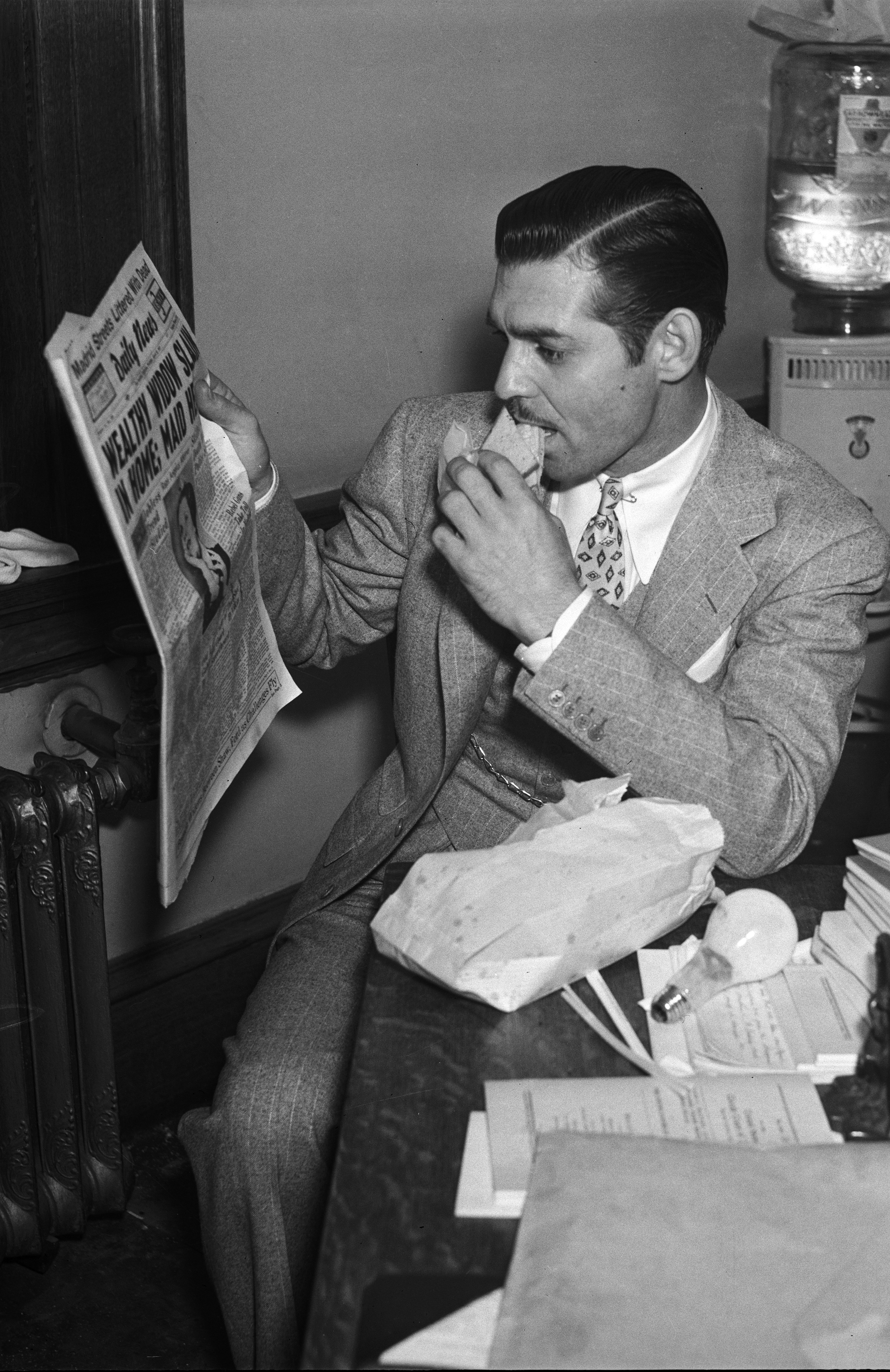
As in women's fashion, menswear turned to Hollywood films for influence, with Clark Gable (pictured in 1937) being one the most influential stars.

A well-groomed look was essential. Hair was sharply parted or slicked back, and most men were clean-shaven, though thin mustaches—as worn by Clark Gable and William Powell—were also fashionable. Men's fashion became increasingly democratic, defined as much by what was absent as by what was present: after Gable appeared without an undershirt in the 1934 film It Happened One Night, sales of men's undershirts allegedly dropped—a phenomenon the apparel trade press dubbed "Go-withoutism", which also extended to sock garters and hats. In 1935, American manufacturer Coopers introduced a revolutionary undergarment, the Jockey brief, which provided support and comfort with a Y-shaped fly and a snug fit. Entertainers also exerted significant influence: some men emulated the idiosyncratic style of Fred Astaire, who famously wore his tie as a belt, while Duke Ellington's silk suits were widely admired and imitated.

Edward VIII adopted and extensively popularized Scholte's relaxed approach to menswear. The Fair Isle sweater, previously confined to sportswear, was widely adopted as casual wear under his influence; plus fours began to be worn off the golf course; and his other signatures—tweed sports jackets, low two-tone or suede shoes, chalk-striped fabrics, and belts rather than suspenders—were extensively imitated. His promotion of a less formal aesthetic also led to the rise of lounge suits, which increasingly superseded more formal attire from the previous decade.

For a brief period during the decade, the tailless "mess jacket"—based on the military mess dress uniform—was worn as an alternative for the white dinner jacket during hot weather.

As with women, Hollywood stars played a leading role in men's fashion of the decade, especially Clark Gable, who popularized sport coats; Gary Cooper, who made two-tone shoes fashionable; and Errol Flynn.

== Children's fashion ==
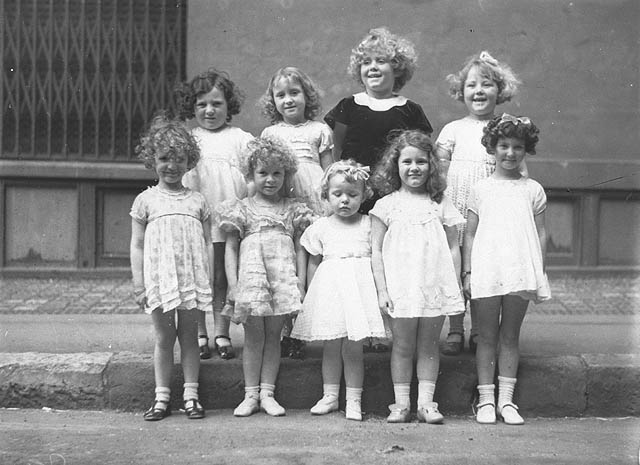
Young girls participating in a Shirley Temple look-alike contest organized by Fox Films and The Daily Telegraph in 1934, Sydney.

In the 1930s, girls' fashion emphasized practicality and reflected adult trends. Toddlers wore "loose, smocklike dresses" with yokes, often paired with matching bloomers visible beneath short skirts, adorned with "smocking and embroidery" as favored decorations. Older girls' dresses had fitted bodices with attached skirts, typically featuring a sash tied at the back, with waistlines returning to their anatomical position. Skirt fullness varied with adult styles, and "puffed sleeves were commonly seen." School attire included skirts and blouses, some with straps or suspenders, while sportswear comprised pullover or cardigan sweaters and slacks. The influence of child actress Shirley Temple shaped young girls' dress styles. By 1935, Sears, Roebuck featured a complete Shirley Temple line of fashions for girls based on her film costumes, ranging from day dresses in petite prints to all-wool snowsuits. Outerwear included "princess-line coats, often with fur-trimmed collars," paired with matching leggings for cold weather.

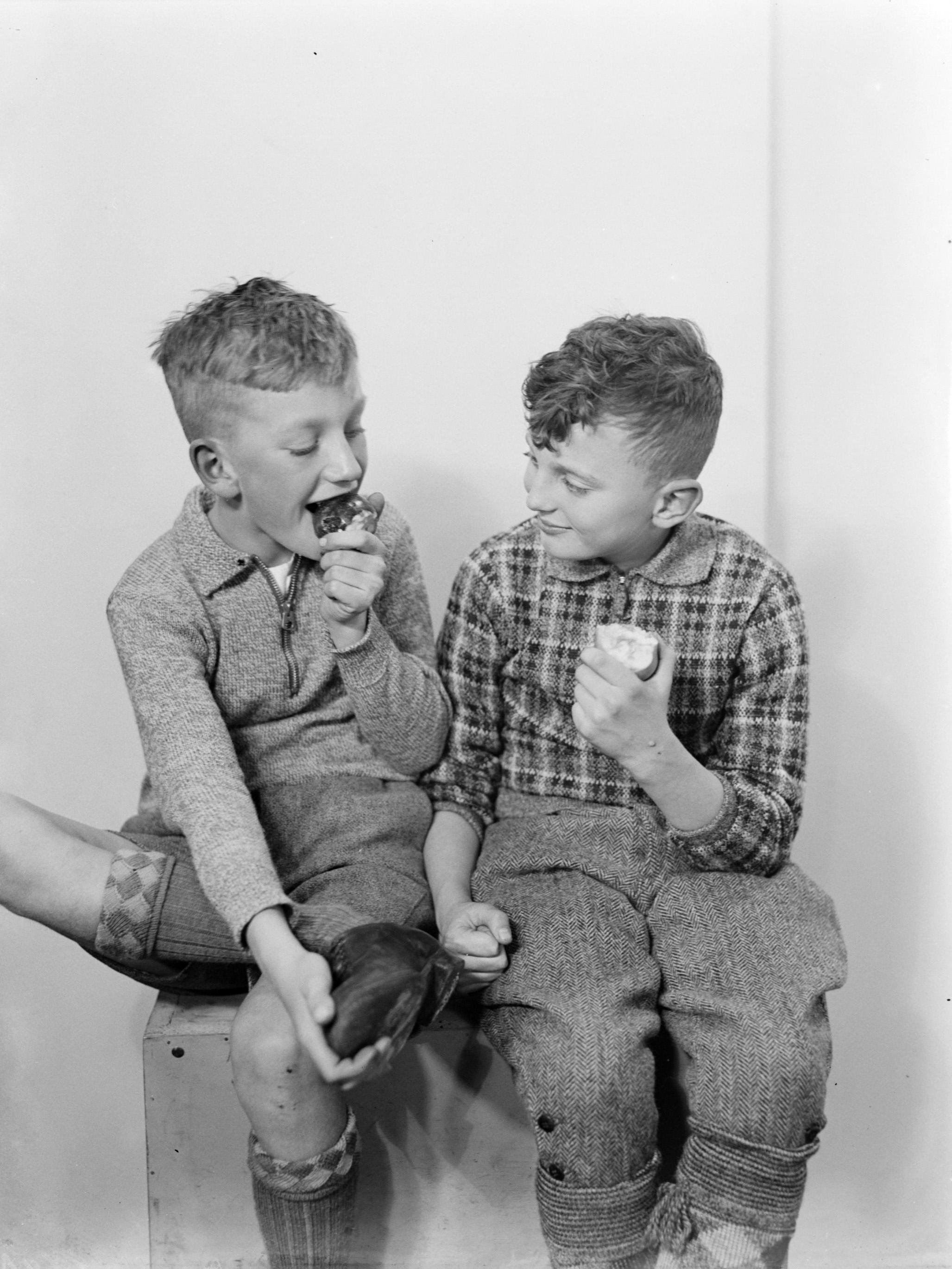
Two Dutch boys eating apples, 1931.

Boys' fashion in the 1930s moved away from earlier practices, with small boys no longer wearing skirts and instead donning "romper suits or short pants." Boys progressed from short pants to knickers, then long trousers as they aged. Everyday wear included polo shirts and "cotton knit pullovers with napped under surfaces," later known as sweatshirts. Formal attire featured shorter, unbelted jackets styled like adult men's, sometimes with matching vests. Sweaters, including cardigans and pullovers, were common, though turtlenecks waned in popularity. Outerwear included "fingertip-length, boxy jackets" and poplin or waterproof parkas, with dress coats mirroring adult men's styles and casual options like mackinaws. The "custom of dressing small boys in blue" became more established during this decade.

The young princesses Elizabeth and Margaret were also widely imitated; typically dressed in identical outfits, their side-parted hair, smocked dresses, pleated skirts, and double-breasted coats with matching hats became popular models for girls' fashion across Britain and beyond.

Beginning in the 1930s, both boys and girls wore jeans for play and everyday use, with "overalls made of blue denim and pants" featured in catalogs like Sears, Roebuck, though "rivets on the back pockets" were discontinued due to damage to school furniture. Preschoolers wore sailor suits in the case of boys or dresses in the case of girls, as well as themed costumes—such as cowboy and Indian suits or flyers' uniforms inspired by figures like Buck Rogers—that were popular for both. Snowsuits, nearly identical except for pink for girls, used water-repellent fabrics in one-piece designs for younger children and two-piece sets for older ones. Swimsuits followed adult styles, and sleepwear included "footed pajamas, sometimes called sleepers," for young children, with older boys wearing pajamas and girls choosing pajamas or nightgowns.

== Fashion media ==
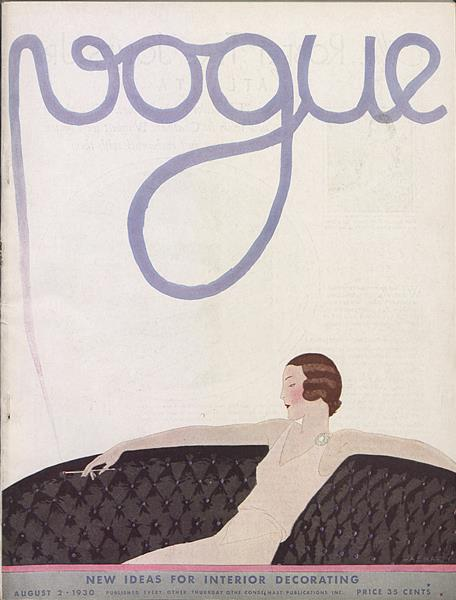
Cover of Vogue magazine, 2 August 1930.

In the 1930s, fashion magazines offered readers an escape into fantasy while simultaneously bolstering luxury consumption, guided by influential editors like Carmel Snow, who joined Harper's Bazaar in 1933 and helped shape the magazines' editorial perspective. These publications pushed luxury items assertively, delineating fashion with precise categories—terms like "bridge frock" or "luncheon frock" encouraged expanding wardrobes and driving industry growth. Diana Vreeland's playful "Why Don't You?" columns in Harper's Bazaar exemplified the genre's whimsical embrace of imagination, though magazines also featured practical money-saving guidance in acknowledgment of economic realities. Even dogs were treated as fashion accessories, with selected breeds profiled alongside cosmetic and clothing trends. Celebrity association was rampant, from models to product endorsements, fueling the era's commercial synergy. The early 1930s also saw the debut of two men's fashion magazines: Apparel Arts (currently GQ) in 1931 and Esquire in 1933.

Visual representation in these publications was a blend of photography and illustration. Photographers such as Edward Steichen and George Hoyningen-Huene defined industry standards; notably, in July 1932, Steichen achieved the first color photographic cover of Vogue France with a swimsuit image. Horst P. Horst began contributing to Vogue in 1931, and other key figures followed: John Rawlings made his Vogue debut in 1936; Louise Dahl-Wolfe, who ran her own New York studio, took up work at Harper's Bazaar; and Toni Frissell joined Vogue in 1931. Martin Munkácsi—whose experience included sports photography for Berlin's Die Dame in the 1920s—transitioned to Harper's Bazaar in 1934, applying his dynamic approach to fashion imagery. German-born Erwin Blumenfeld initiated his Paris fashion photography career, and George Platt Lynes contributed across several titles. Cecil Beaton, designer and photographer, known for his late-1920s Vogue work and British royal family portraits, also played a significant role.

Despite the rise of photography, illustration remained central to fashion narratives, and the 1930s have been considered the heyday of fashion illustration. As 1930s fashion shifted to a more feminine, curved silhouette, illustration lines softened, becoming curvier and more textural, with a focus on skillful execution. Proportions returned to a realistic style, and artistic influences, like Surrealism, added a unique, creative touch to fashion illustrations. At Harper's Bazaar, Erté was a continuing star, while Vogue showcased Georges Lepape and Eduardo García Benito. New illustrators introduced a more gestural, fluid style that contrasted with the formality of the 1910s and 1920s. Among these emerging talents were Christian Bérard, Marcel Vertès, Carl "Eric" Erickson, and René Gruau, all of whom contributed to a modernized visual vocabulary for fashion.

== Image galleries ==
=== Style gallery: Women's fashion 1930-1939 ===
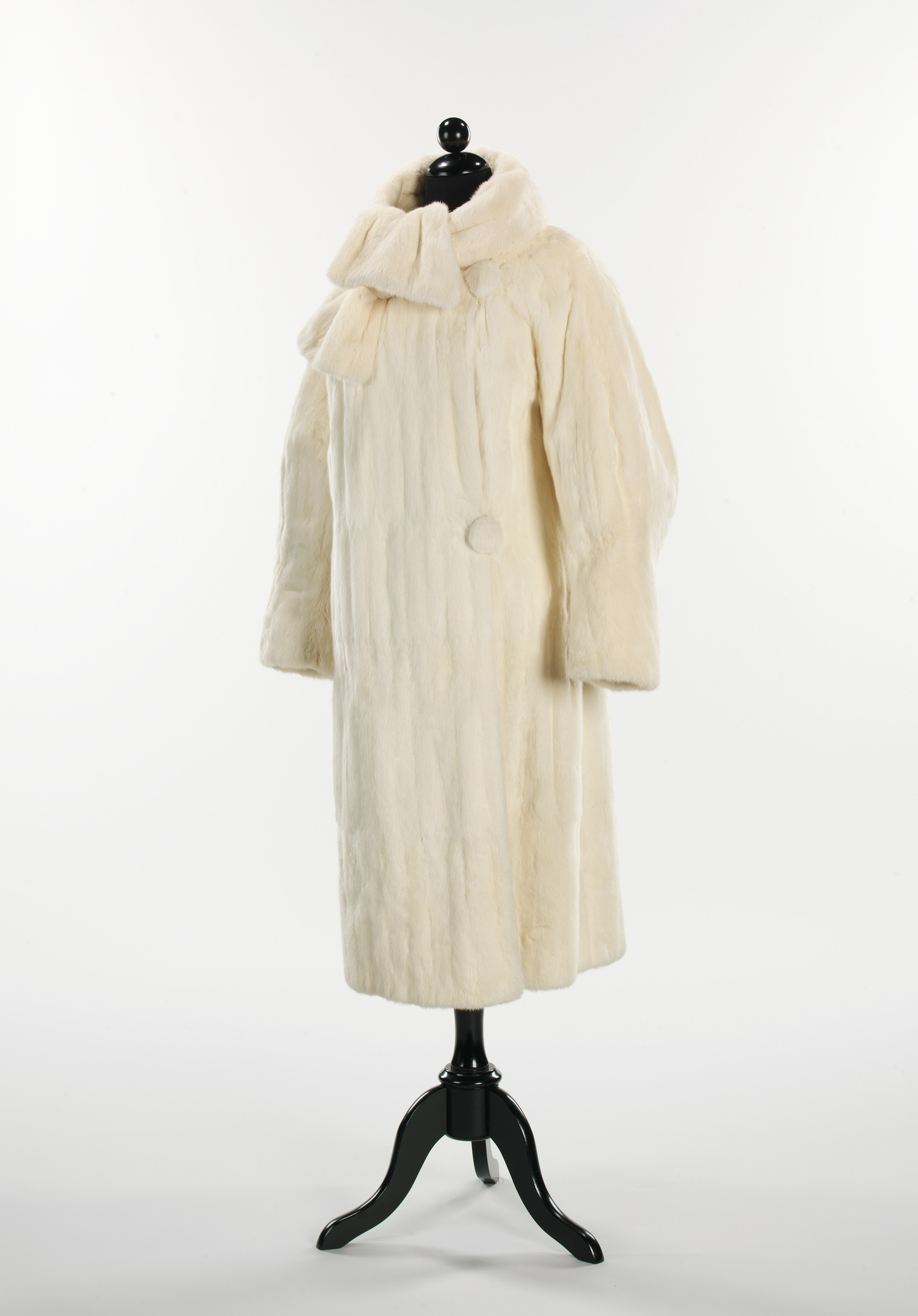
Evening coat by Revillon Frères made of fur, 1930.

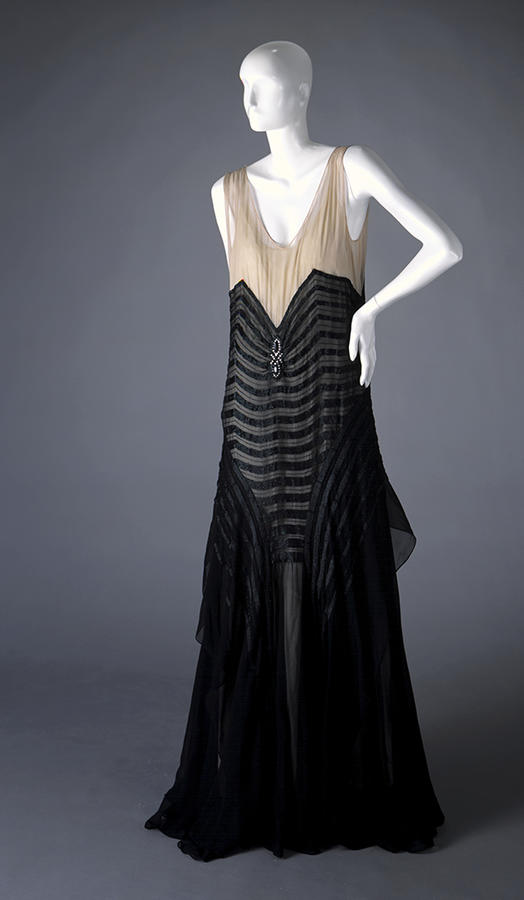
Evening dress from France made of bead-embroidered silk, c. 1930.

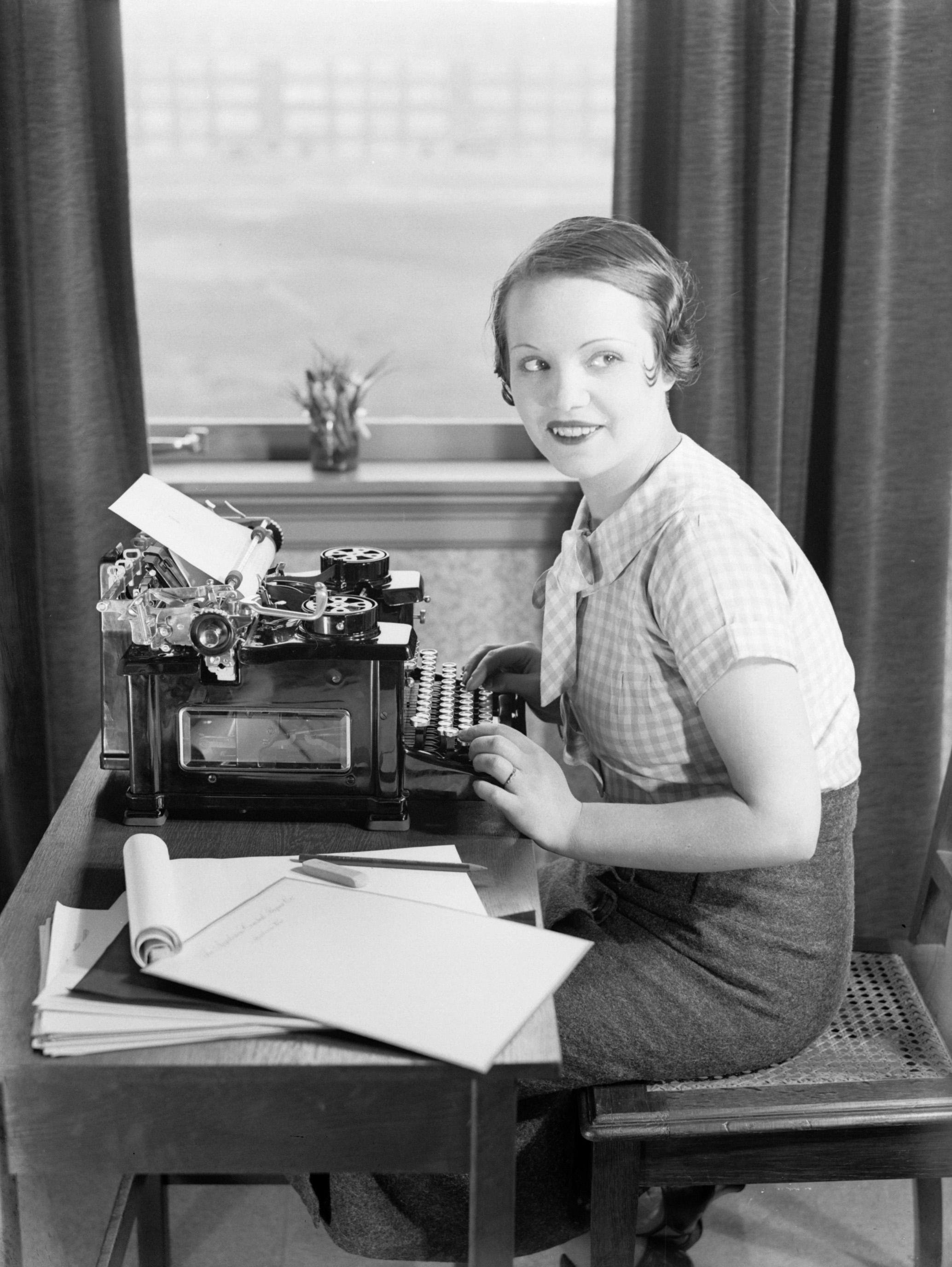
A young typist in the Netherlands, 1931.

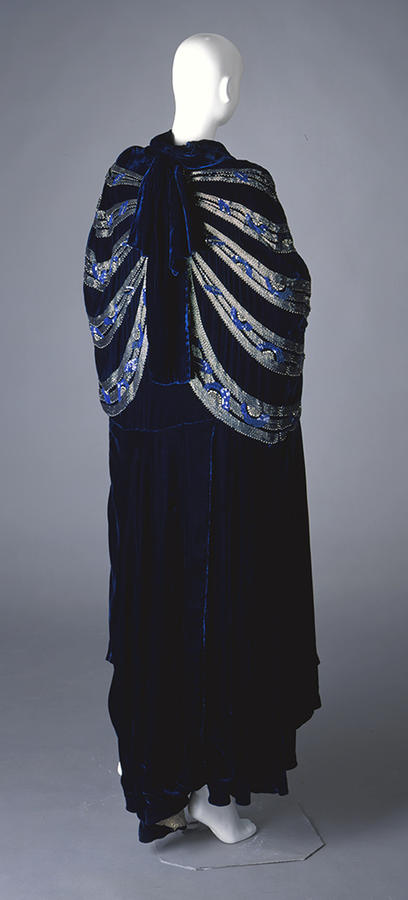
An opera cloak from France made of silk velvet, embroidered with beads, sequins, and rhinestones, 1931.

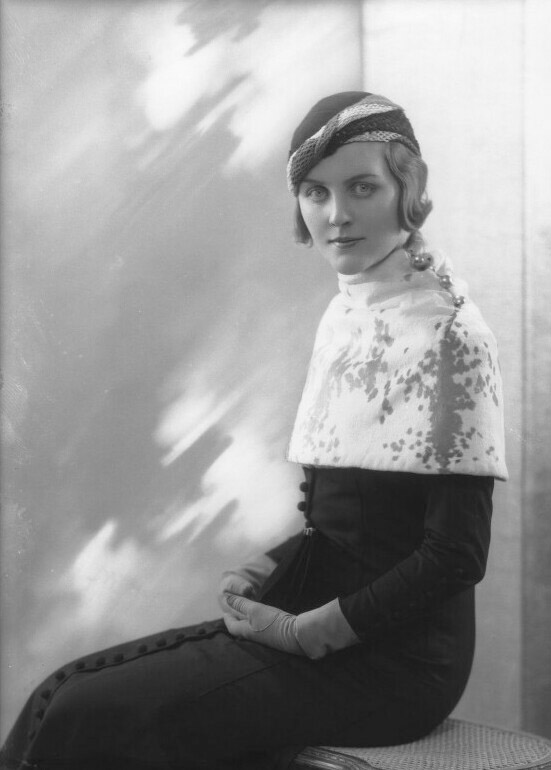
English aristocrat Diana Mosley, 1932.

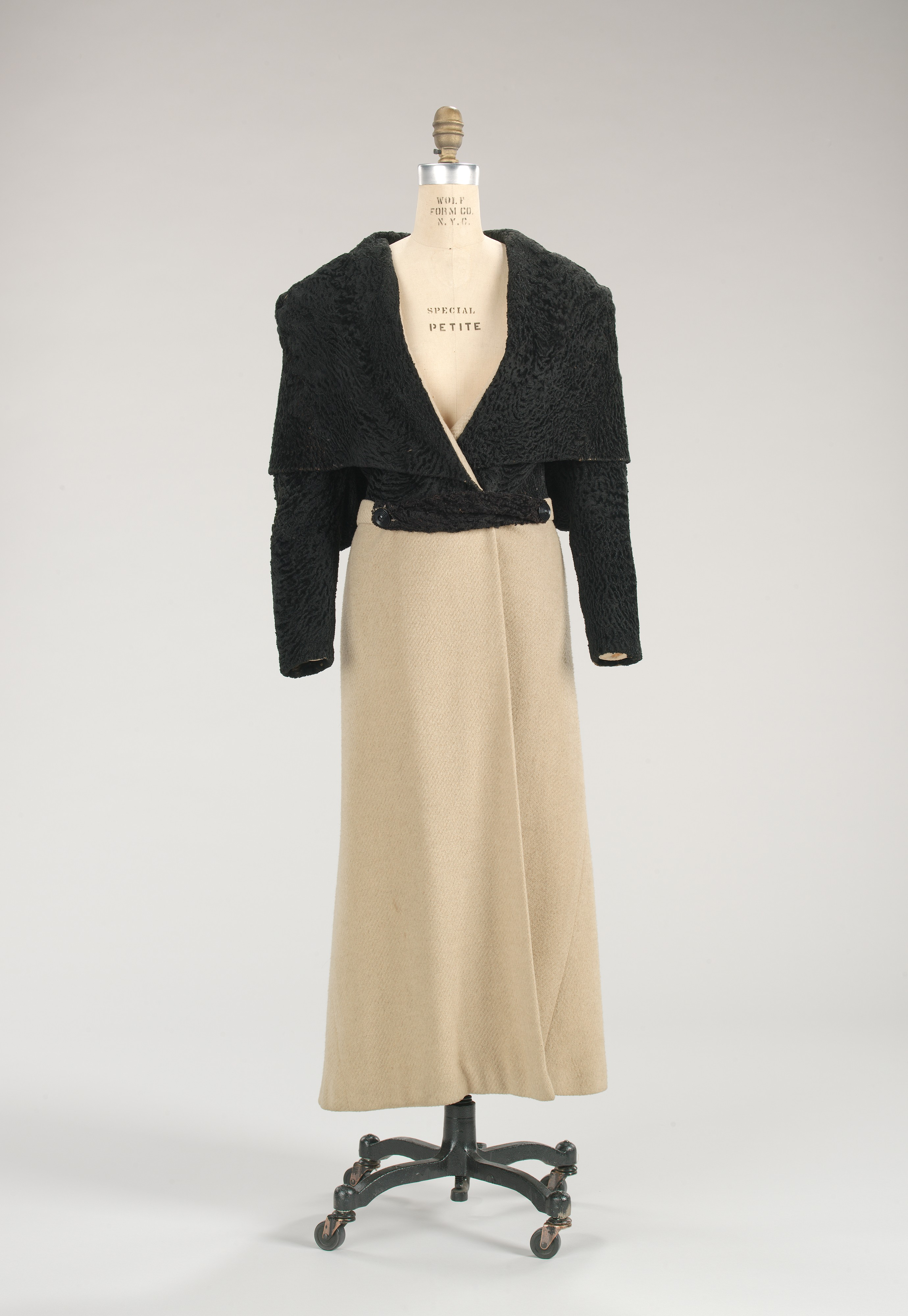
Evening coat by Jeanne Lanvin made of wool and fur, 1932.

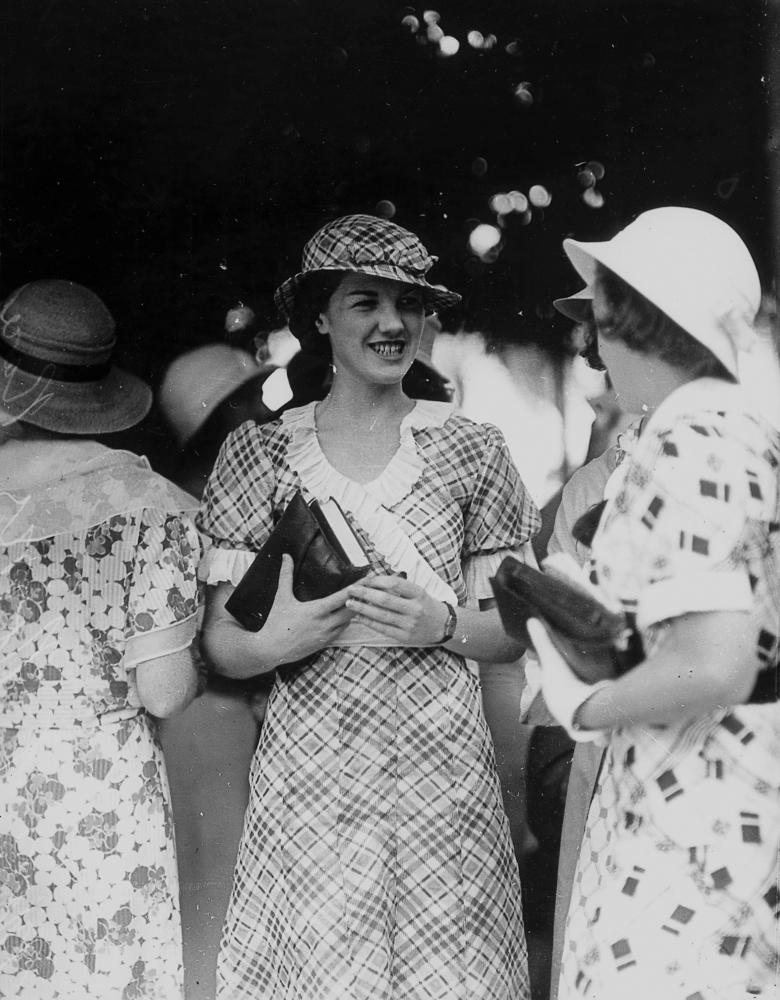
A group of women at a horse race in Brisbane, 1933.

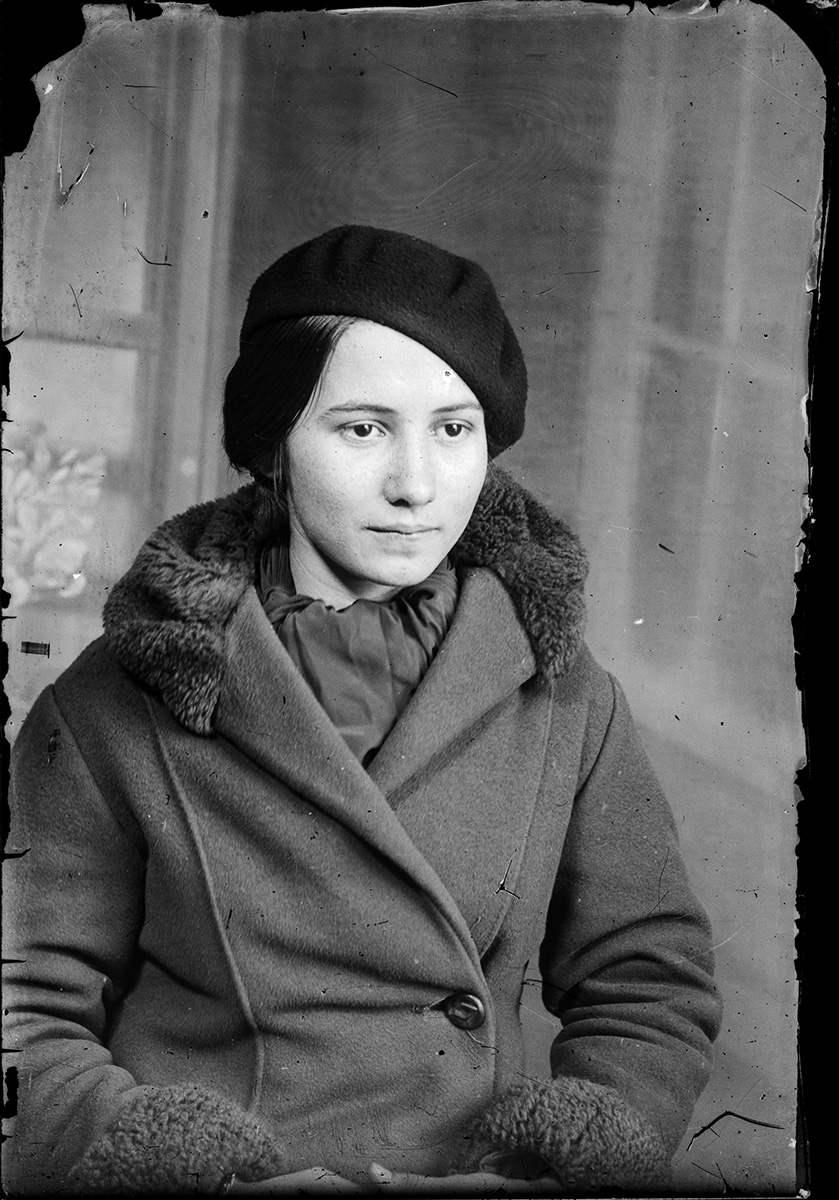
Portrait of a young woman in Romania, c. 1930s.

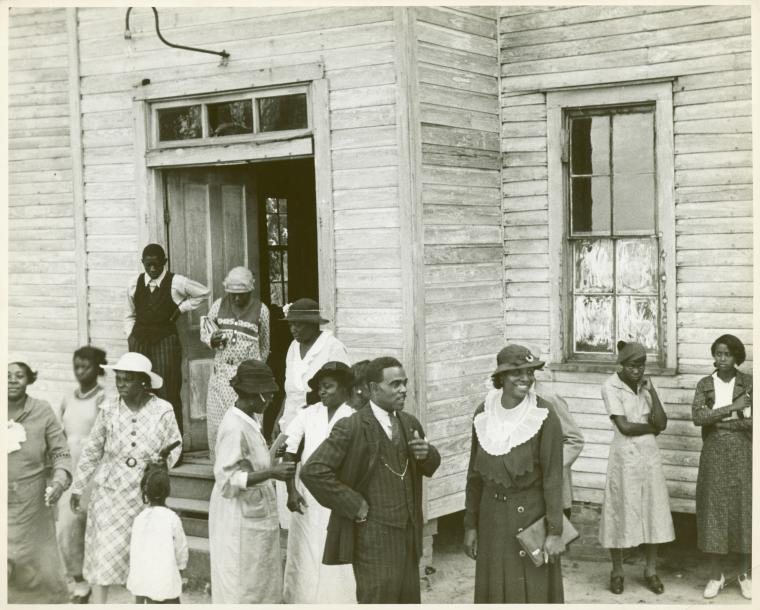
Rural workers during Sunday mass in Little Rock, Arkansas, 1935, photographed by Ben Shahn for the Resettlement Administration.

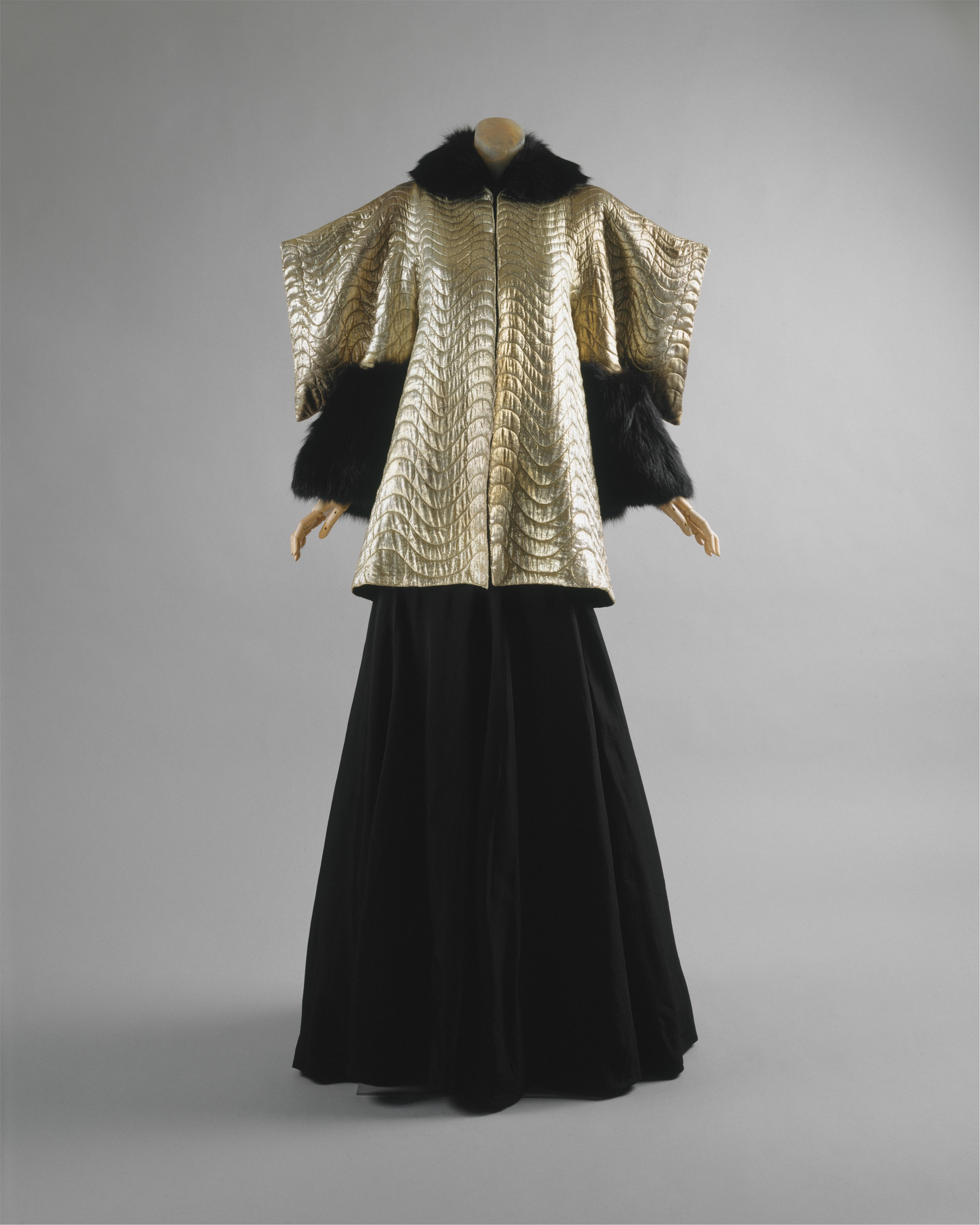
Evening jacket by Jeanne Lanvin made of silk, fur and metallic thread, 1936.

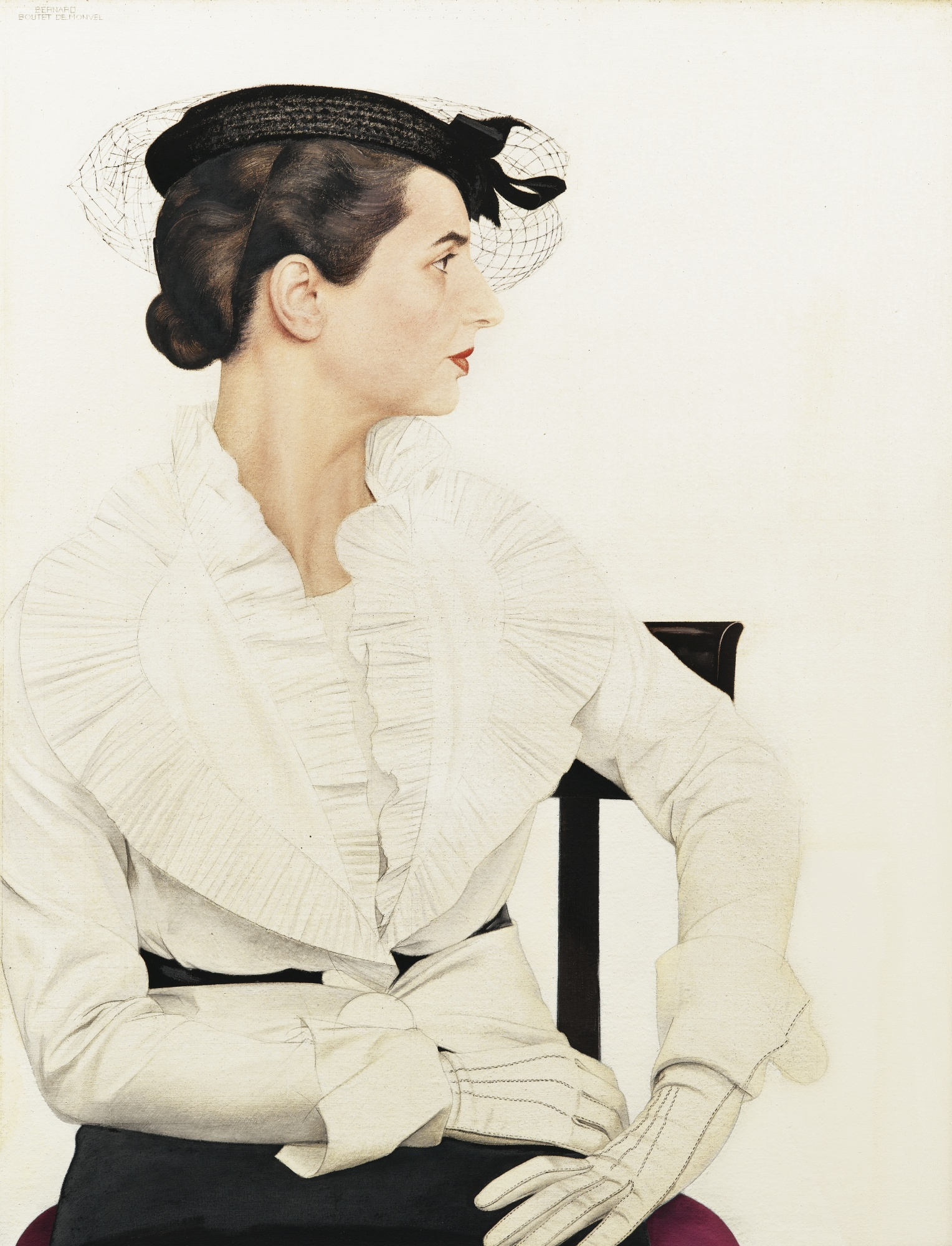
Portrait of a lady by Bernard Boutet de Monvel, 1936.

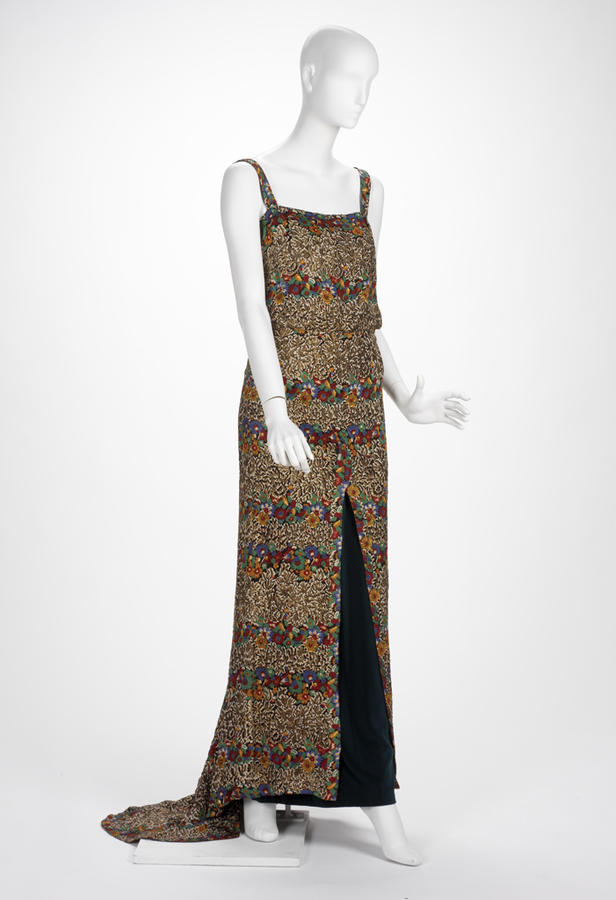
Evening dress by Bergdorf Goodman made of silk, velvet and metallic thread, 1937

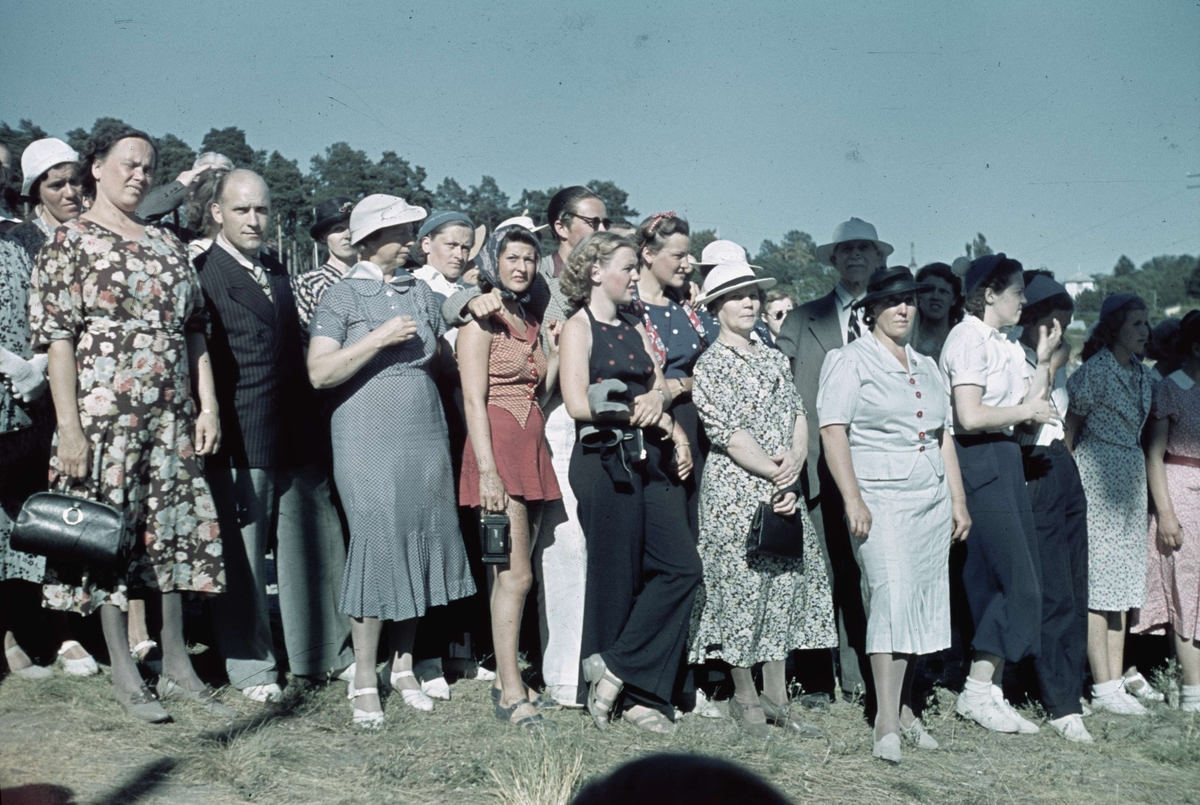
Women's fashion in Sweden, 1938.

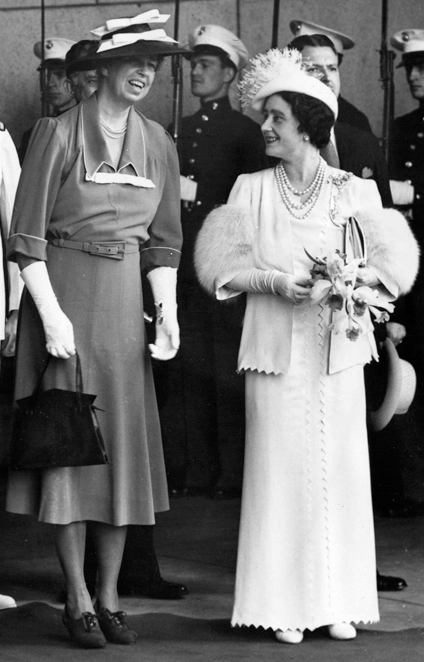
Eleanor Roosevelt and Queen Elizabeth in Washington, D.C., 1939.

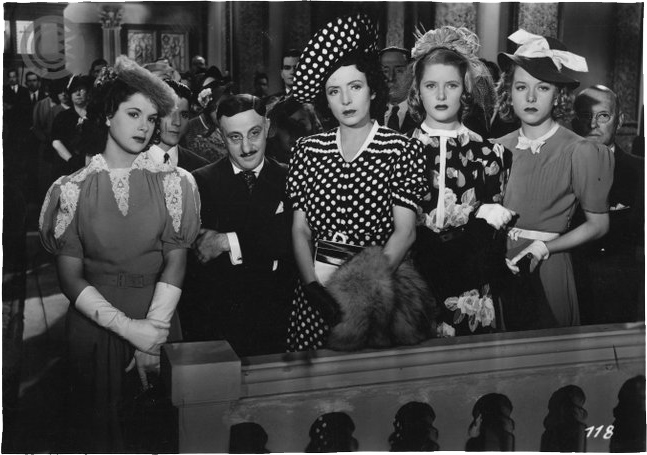
Delia Garcés, Enrique Serrano, Sofía Bozán, Ana May and Mary Dormal in Muchachas que estudian (1939).

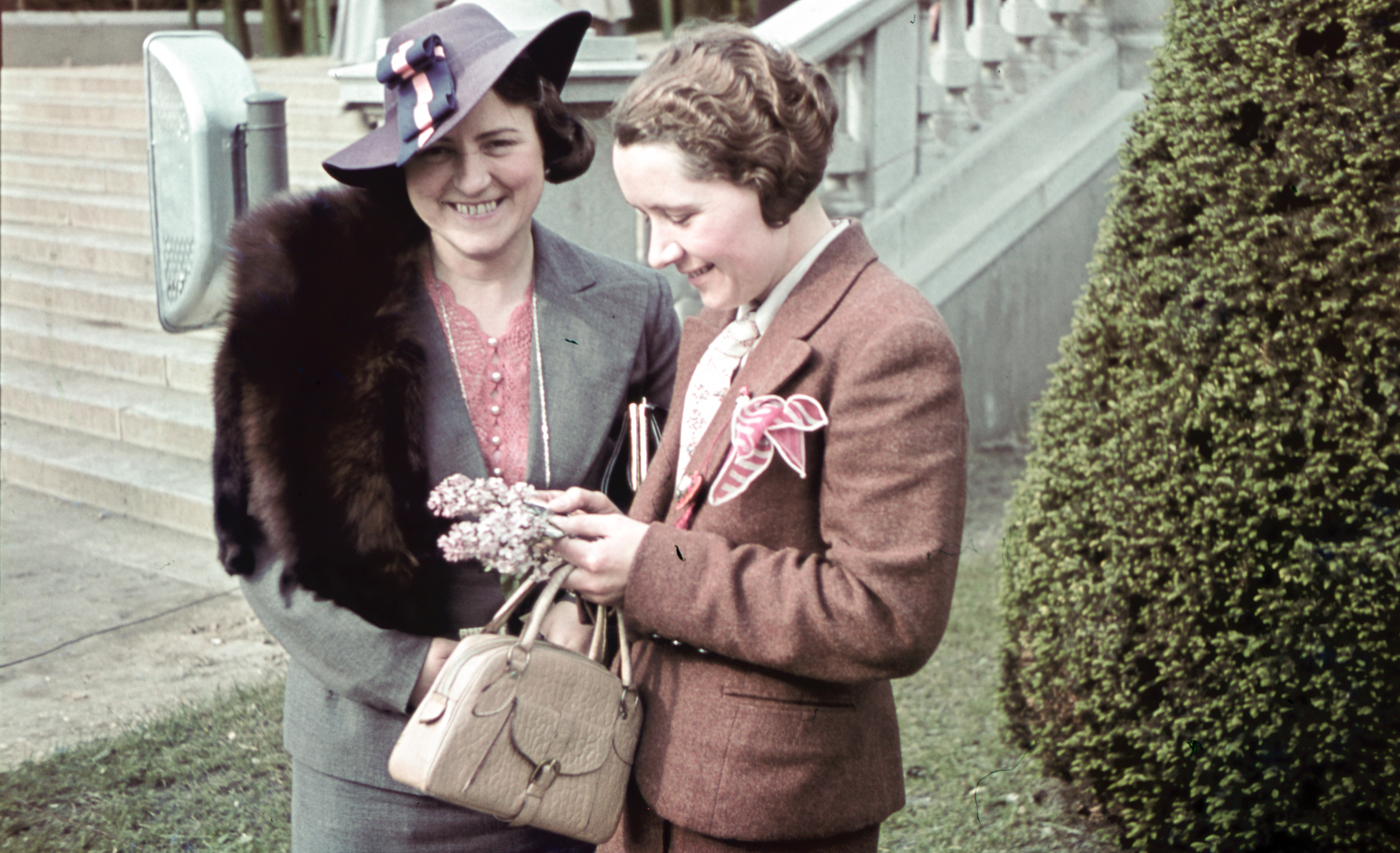
Young women in Budapest, 1939.

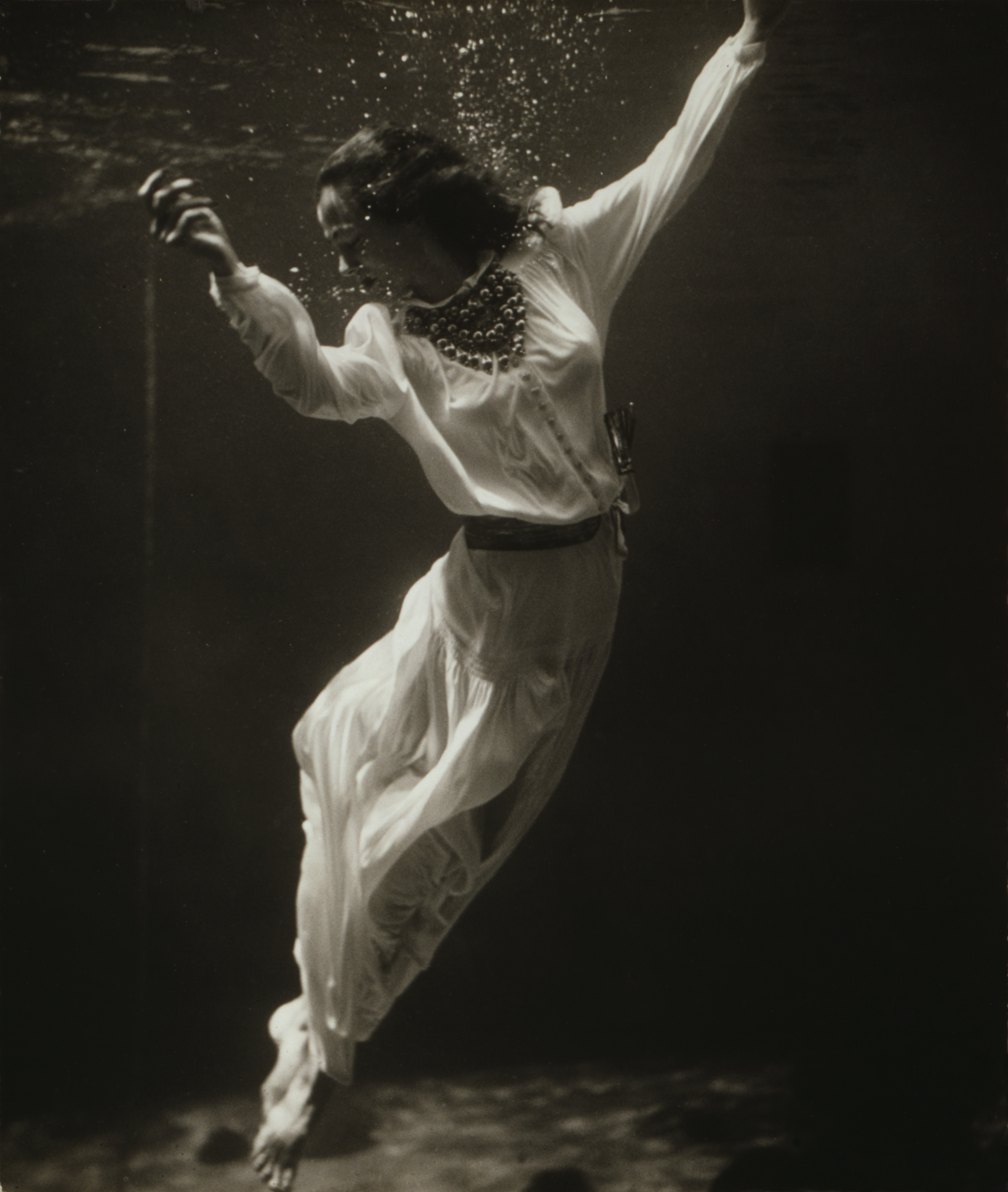
A 1939 fashion photograph by Toni Frissell, featuring a model underwater in a dolphin tank.

=== Style gallery: Hollywood fashion ===
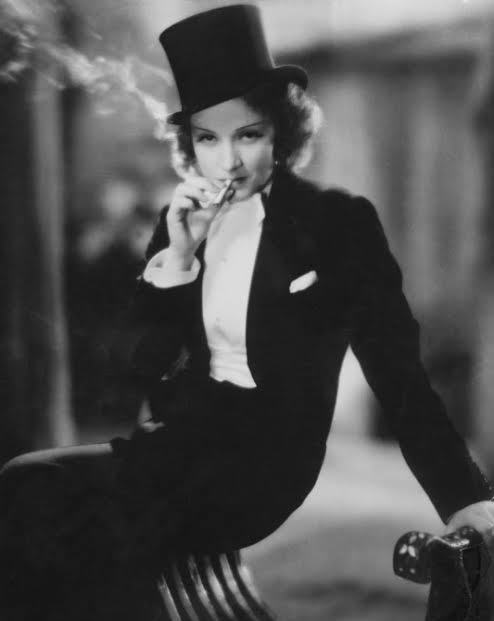
Marlene Dietrich in Morocco (1930), wearing her signature masculine attire, featuring a white tie and top hat.

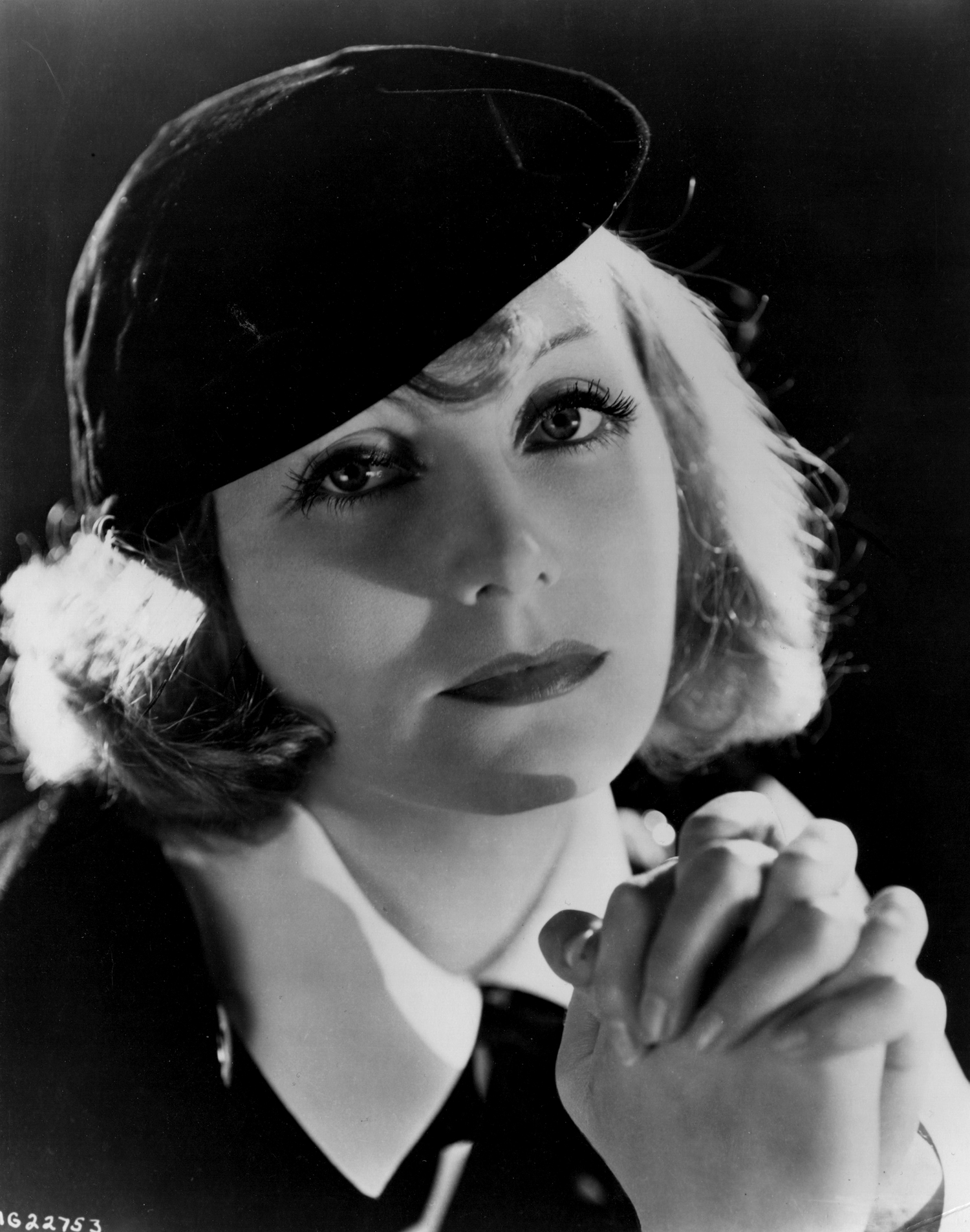
Greta Garbo in Susan Lenox (Her Fall and Rise)(1931), with costume design by Adrian.

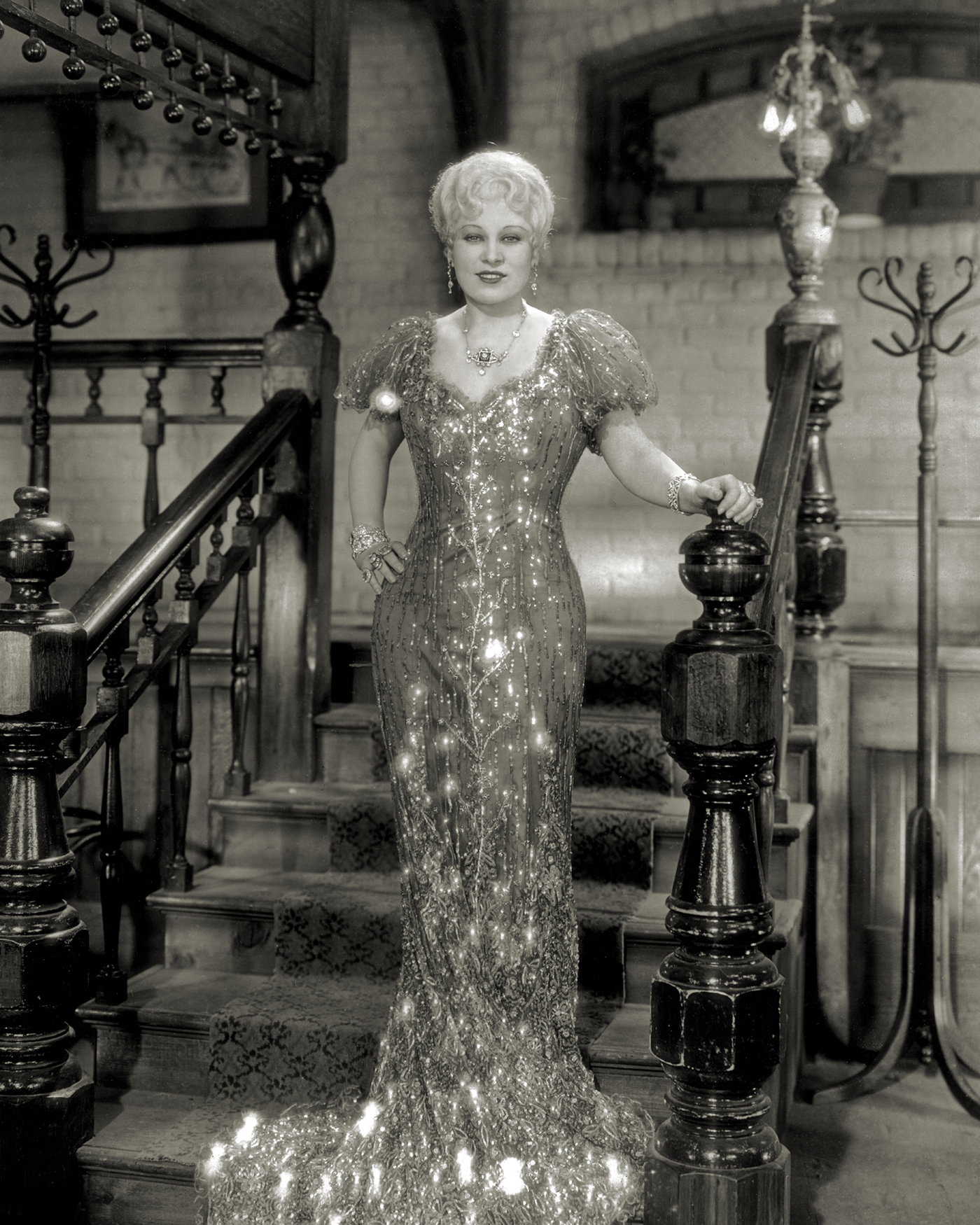
Mae West in She Done Him Wrong (1933), wearing a nightgown designed by Edith Head.

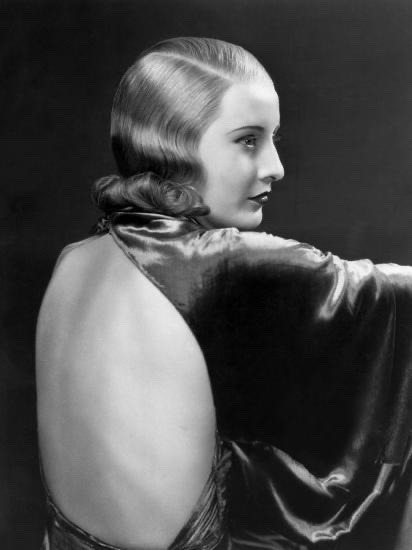
Barbara Stanwyck in Baby Face (1933), wearing a nightgown designed by Orry-Kelly that features a plunging back.

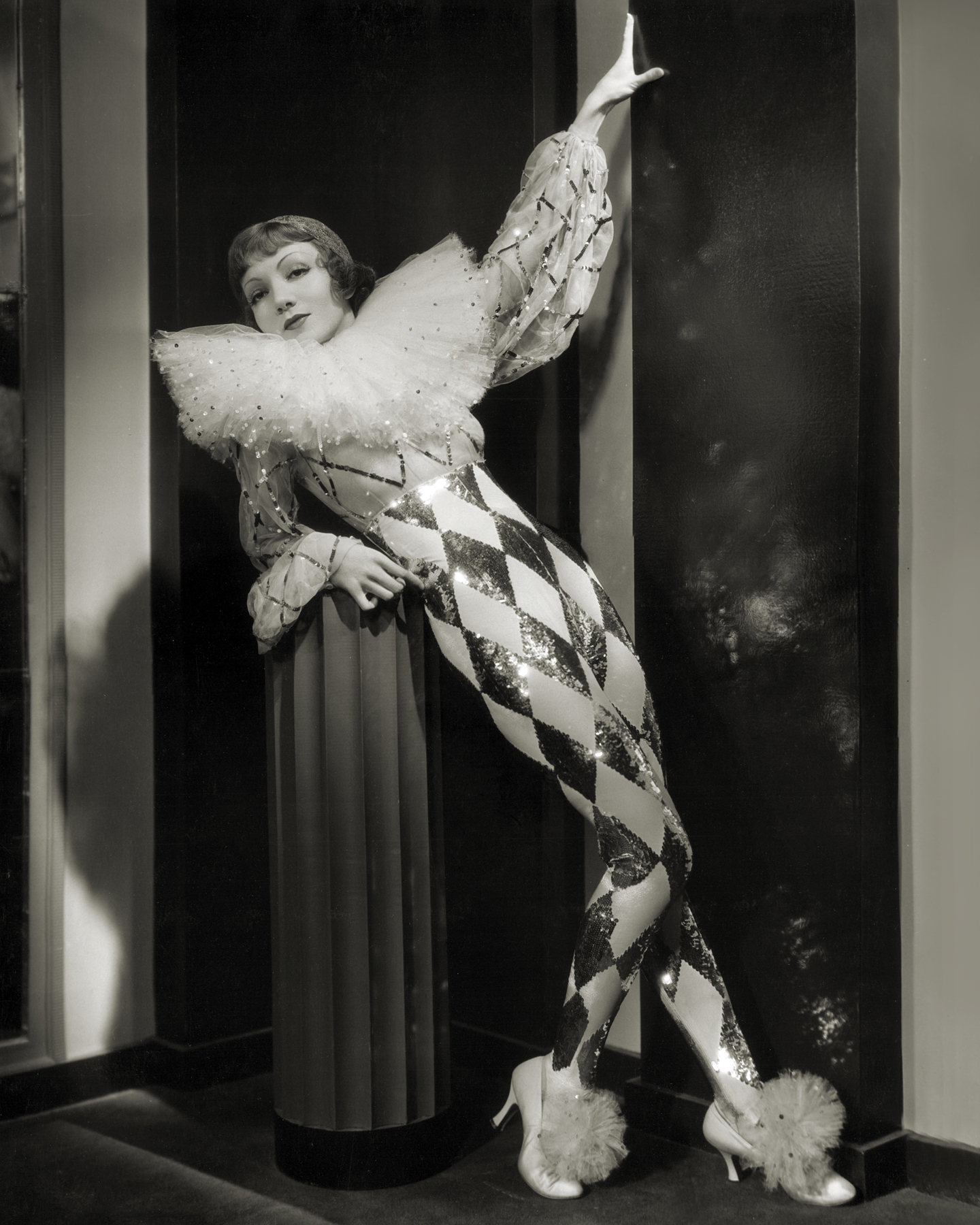
Claudette Colbert wearing a harlequin-inspired ensemble in Tonight Is Ours (1933), with costume design by Travis Banton.

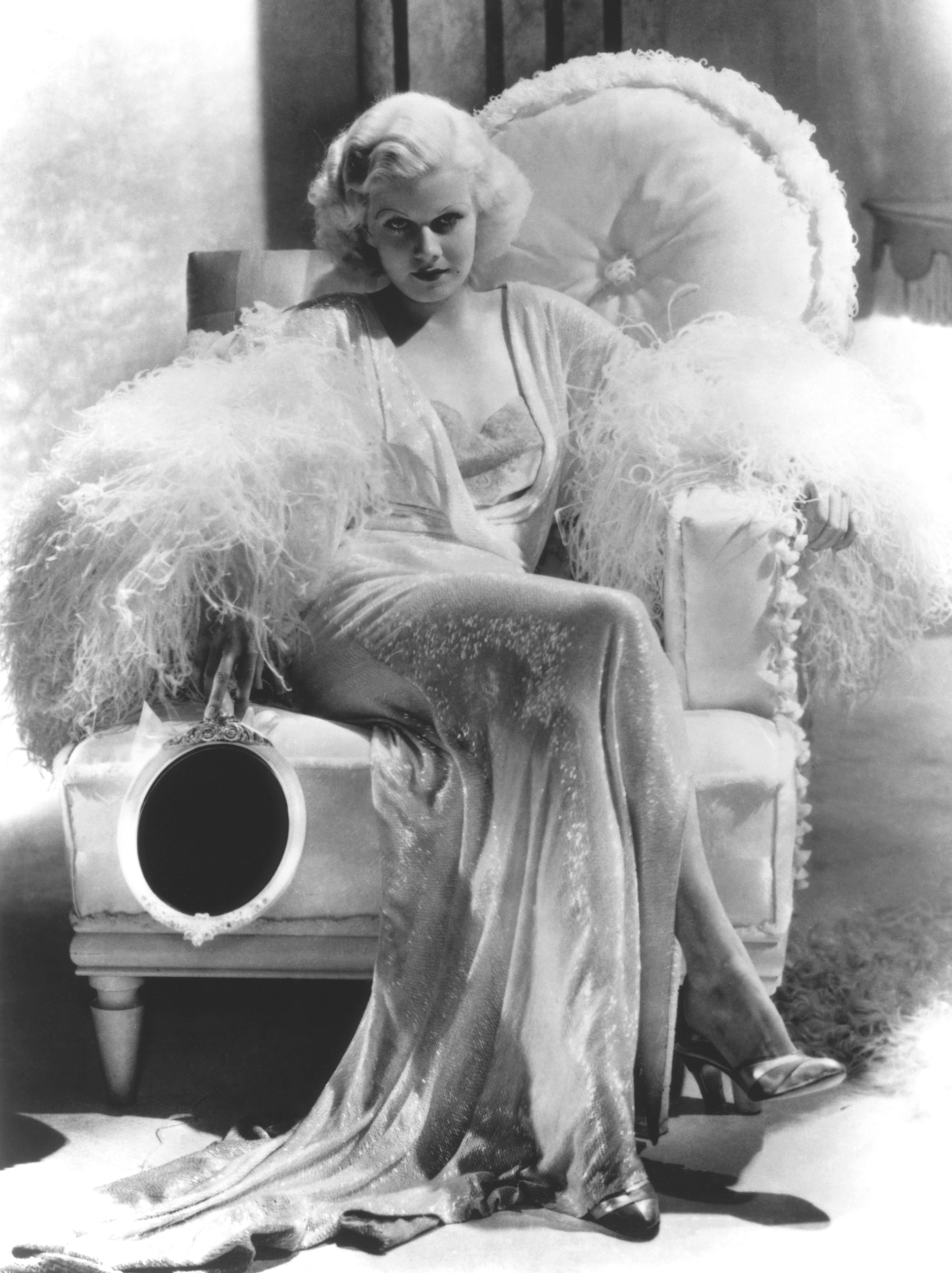
Jean Harlow in Dinner at Eight (1933), wearing a satin gown and ostrich-feather robe designed by Adrian.

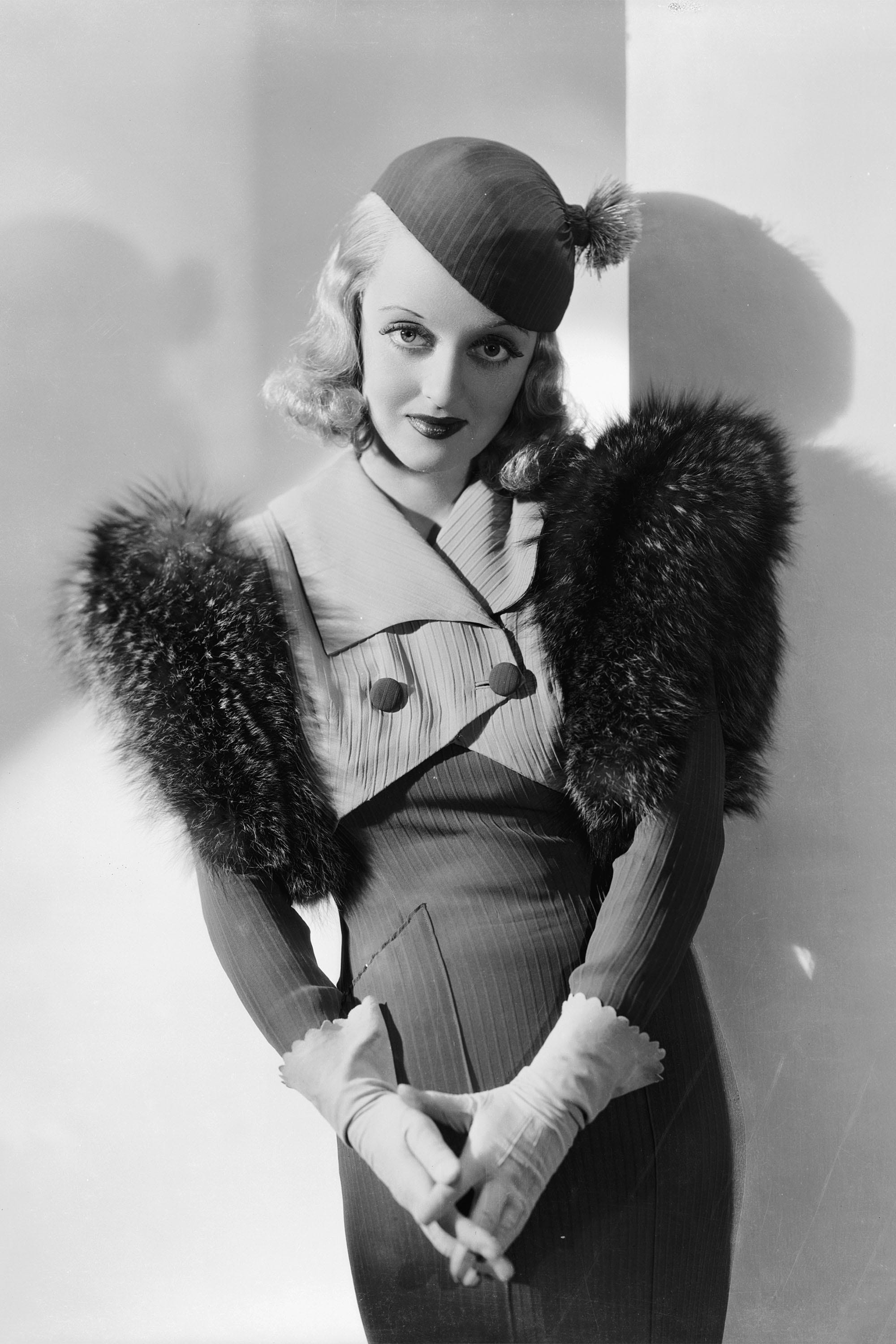
Bette Davis in Fashions of 1934 (1934), wearing stylish daywear designed by Orry-Kelly.

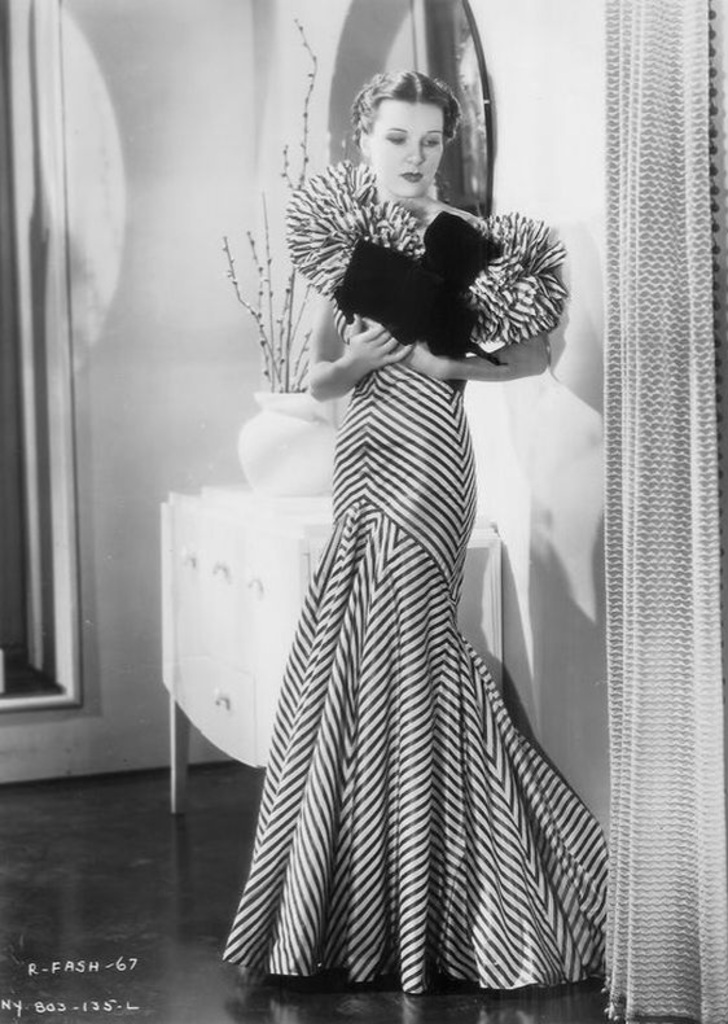
Irene Dunne in Roberta (1935), with costume design by Bernard Newman.

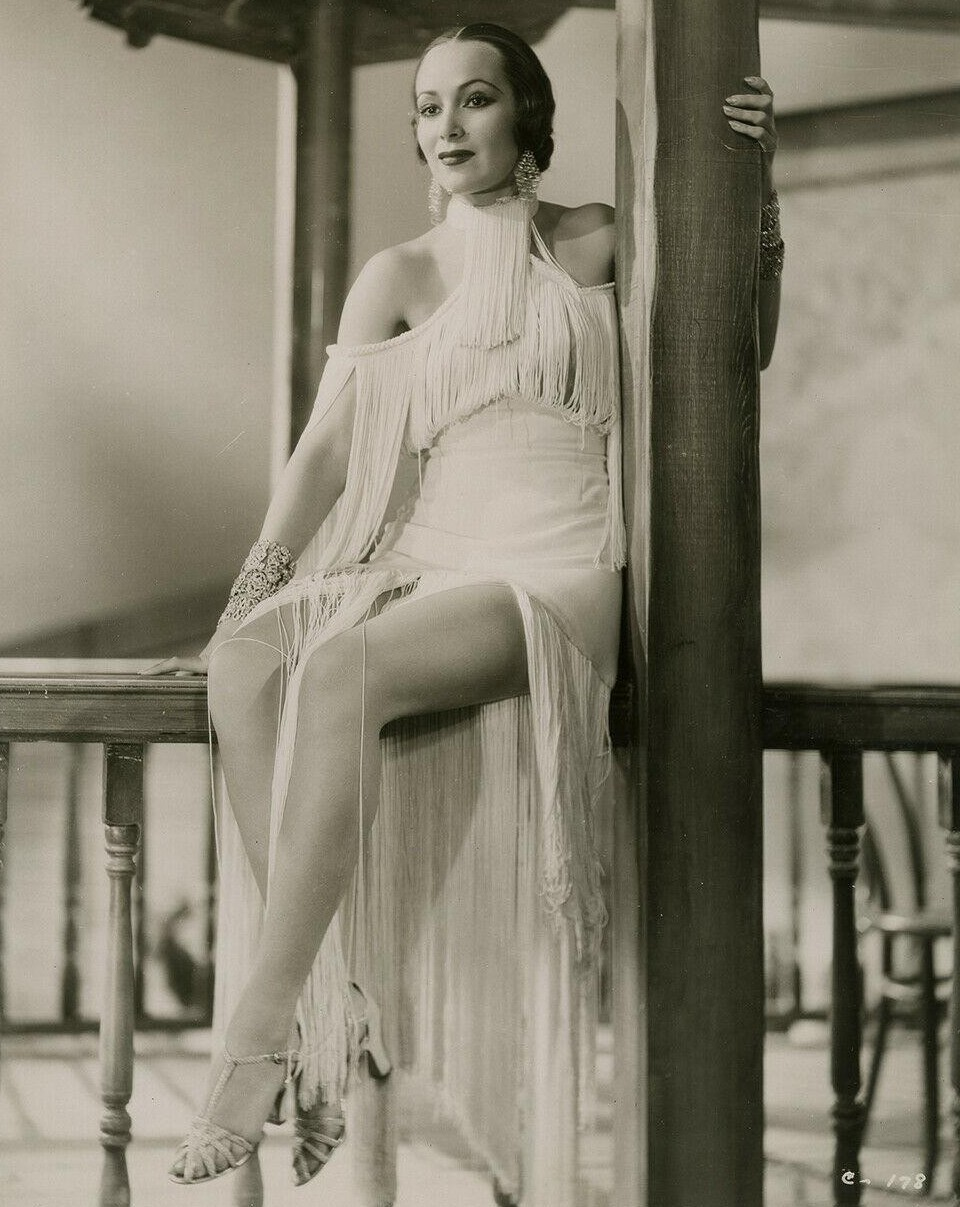
Dolores del Río in In Caliente (1935), wearing a dress by Orry-Kelly.

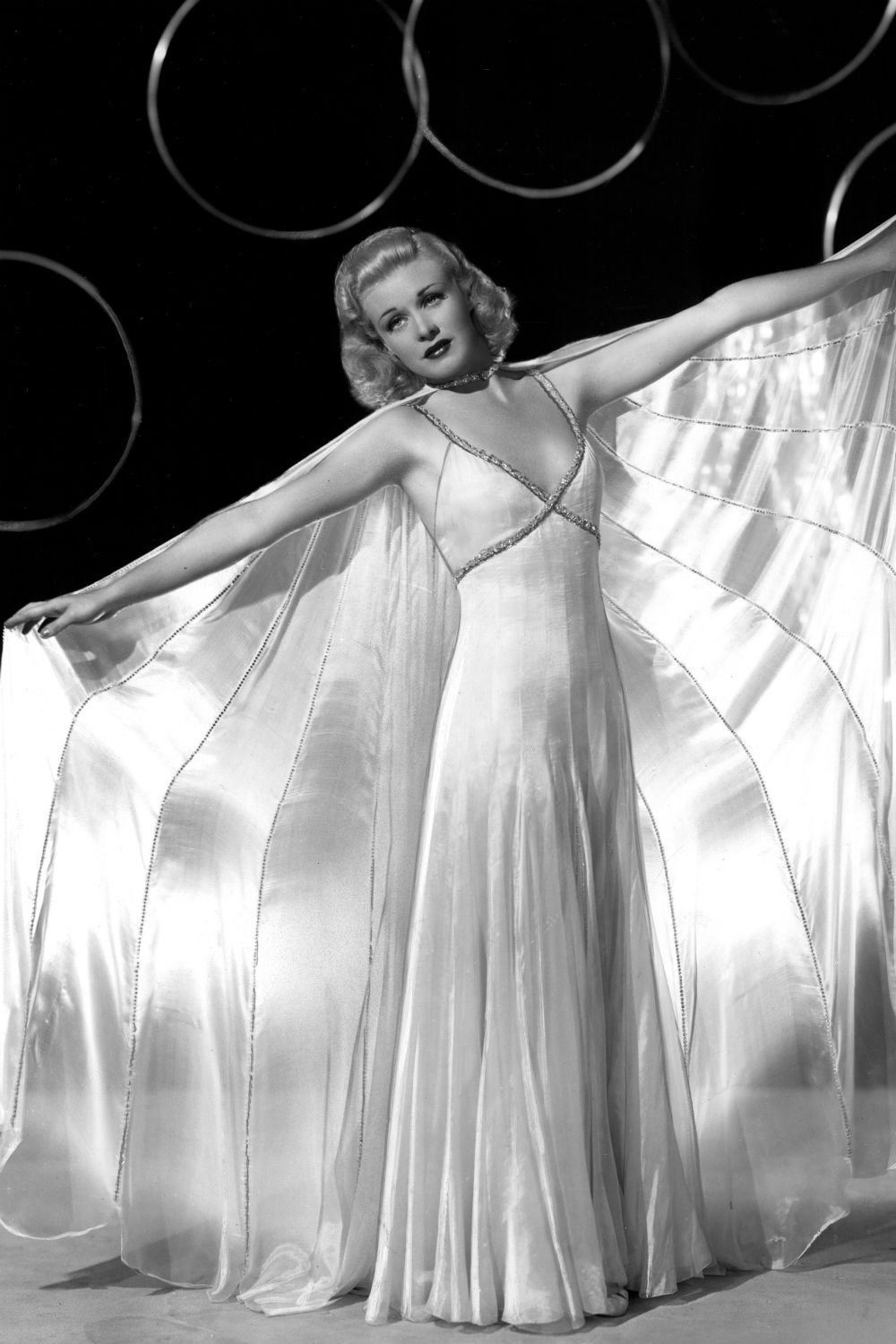
Ginger Rogers in Swing Time (1936), wearing a silk nightgown and matching cape designed by Bernard Newman.

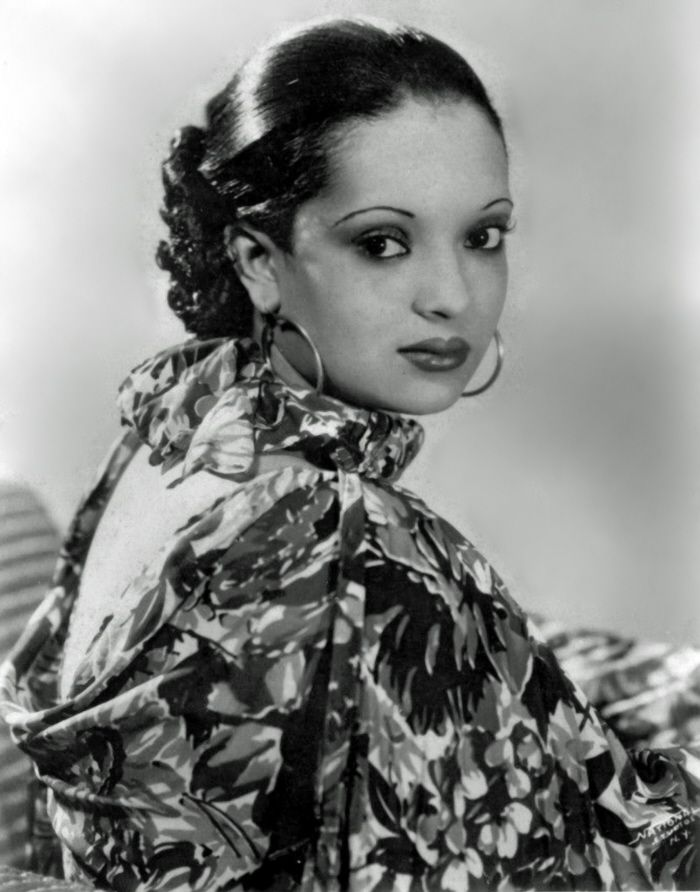
Nina Mae McKinney—one of the first African-American Hollywood actresses—c. 1936, wearing hoop earrings and a floral print ensemble.

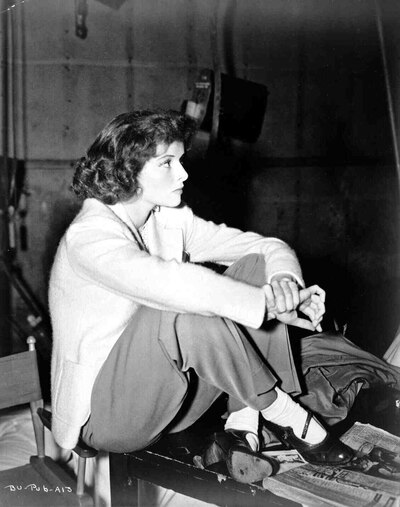
Katharine Hepburn wearing trousers during the filming of Bringing Up Baby (1938).

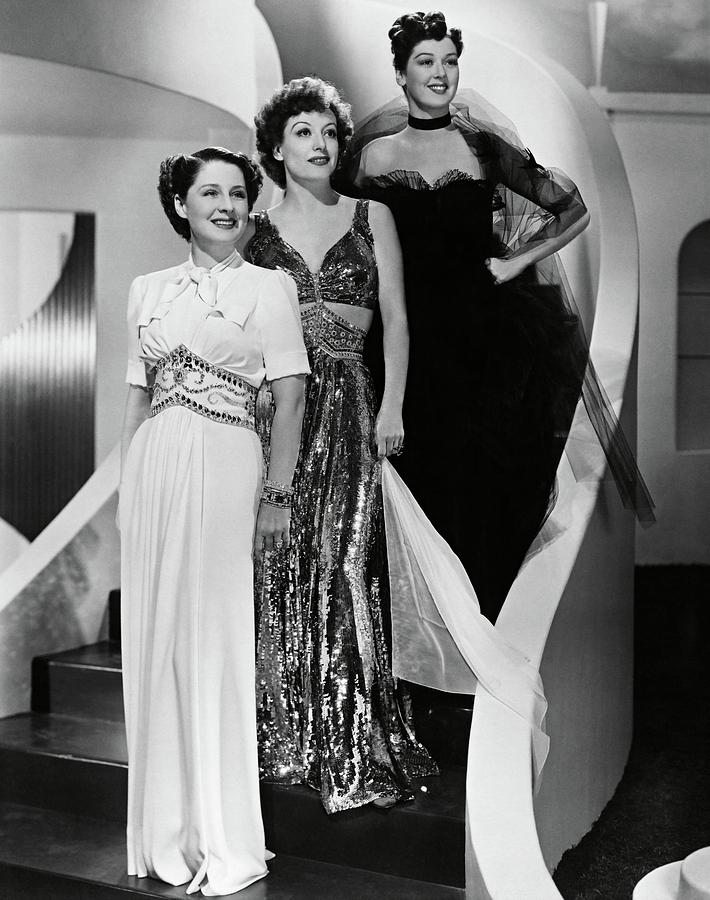
Norma Shearer, Joan Crawford and Rosalind Russell in The Women (1939), wearing nightgowns designed by Adrian.

=== Style gallery: Women's hats ===
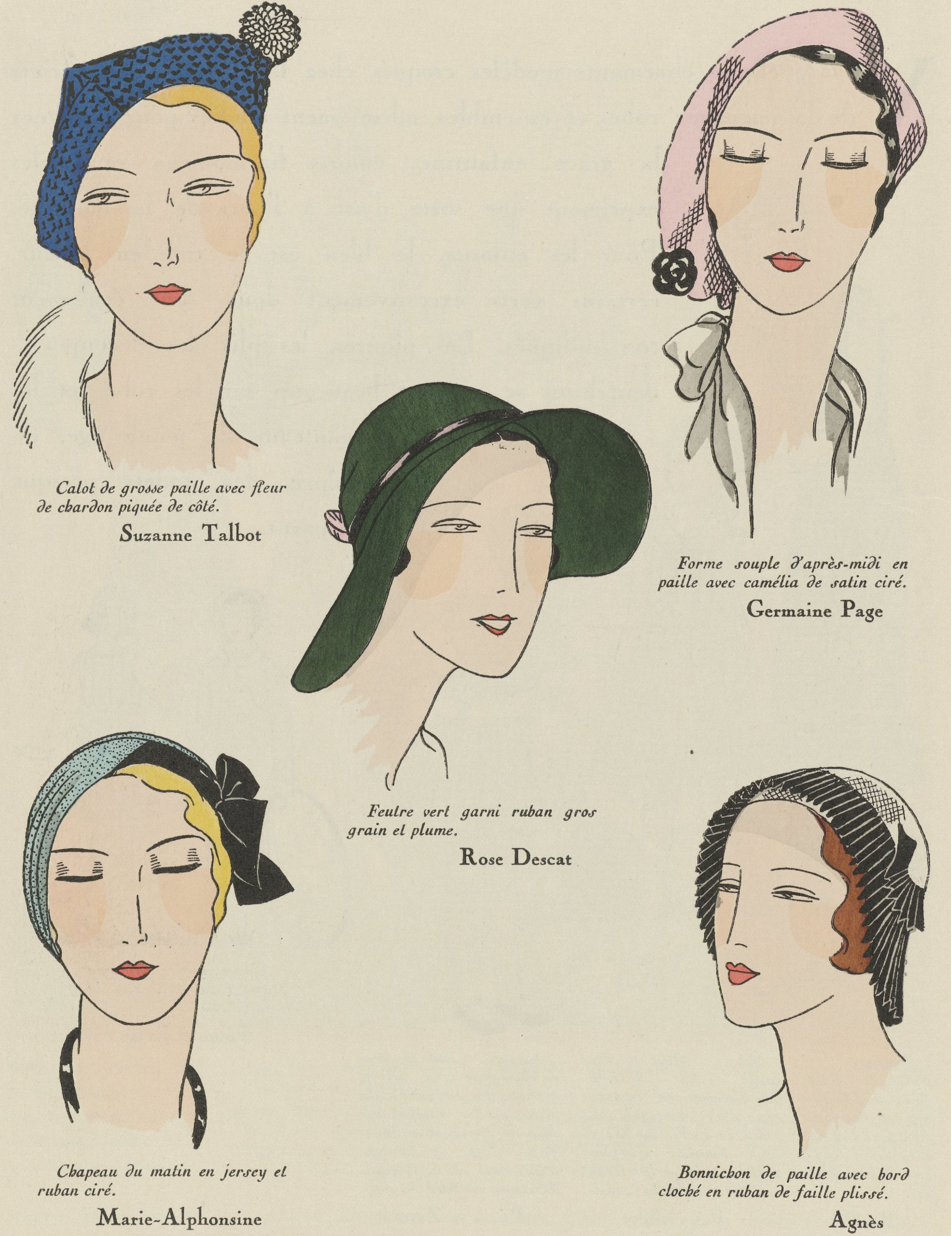
Parisian fashion plate, 1931.

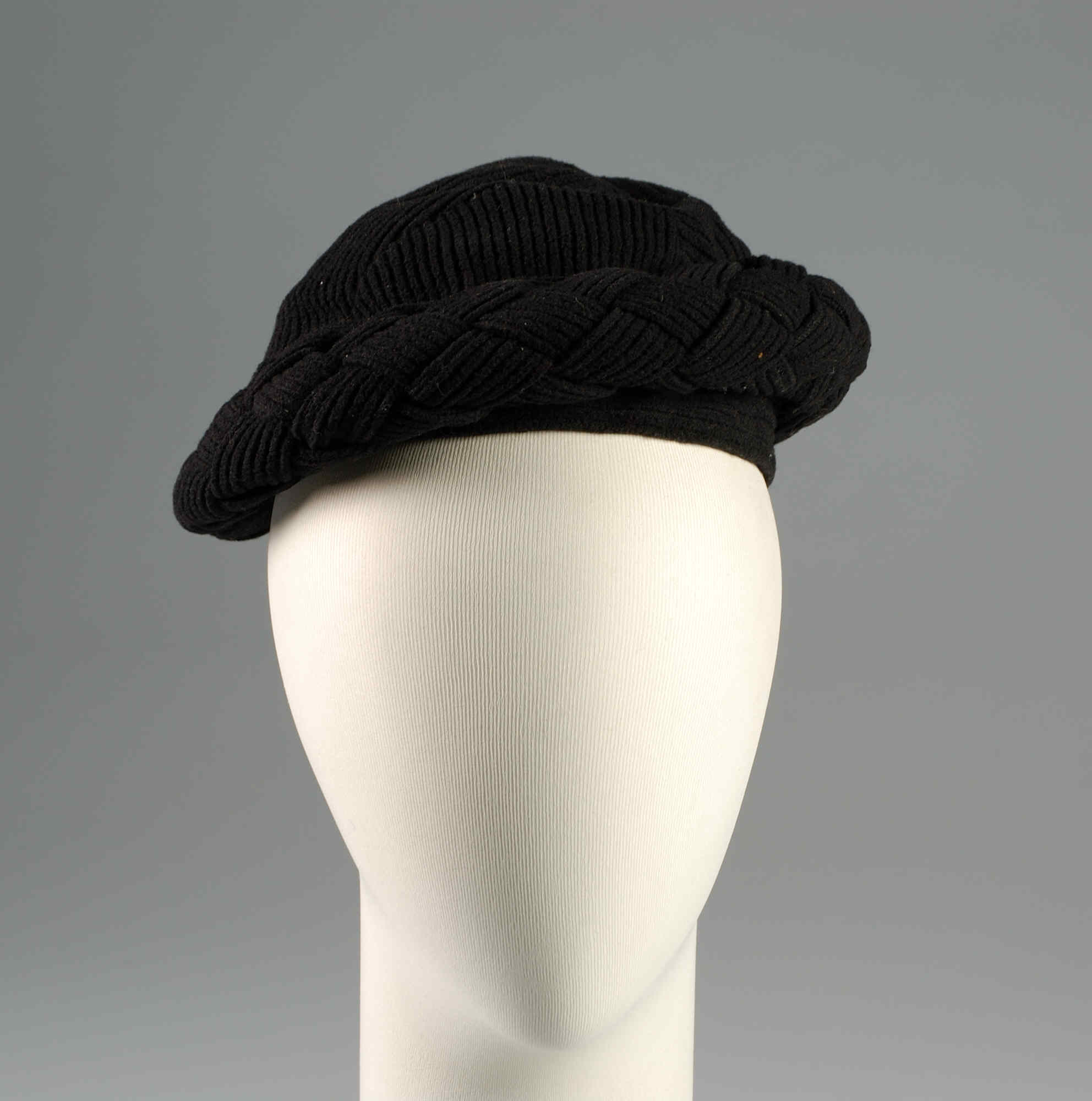
Wool hat by Jeanne Lanvin, 1932.

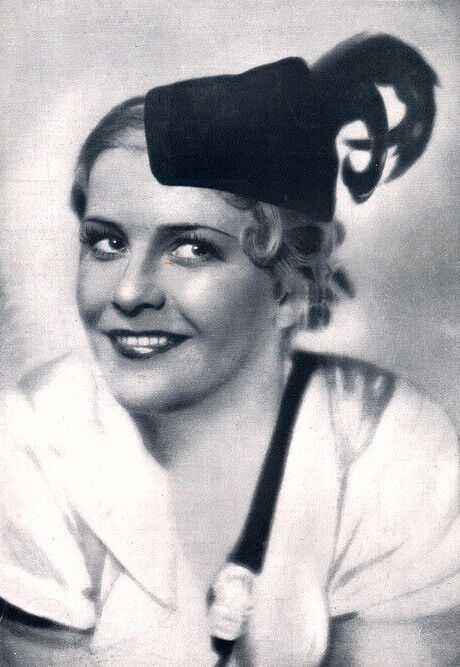
German actress Renate Müller, 1932.

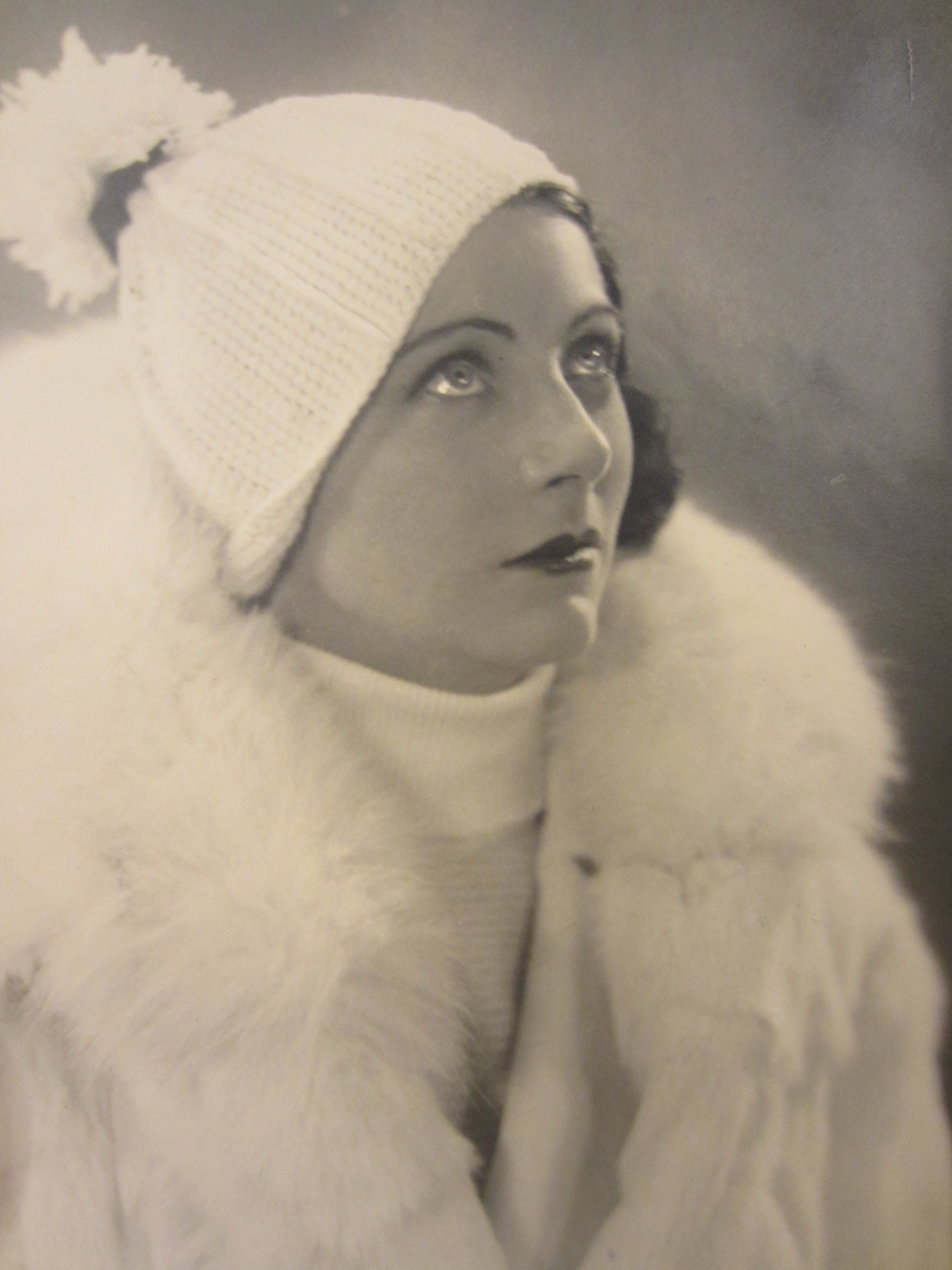
Swedish actress Dora Söderberg, 1933.

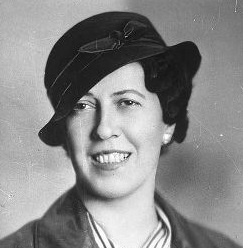
Cadanian athlete Alexandrine Gibb, 1934.

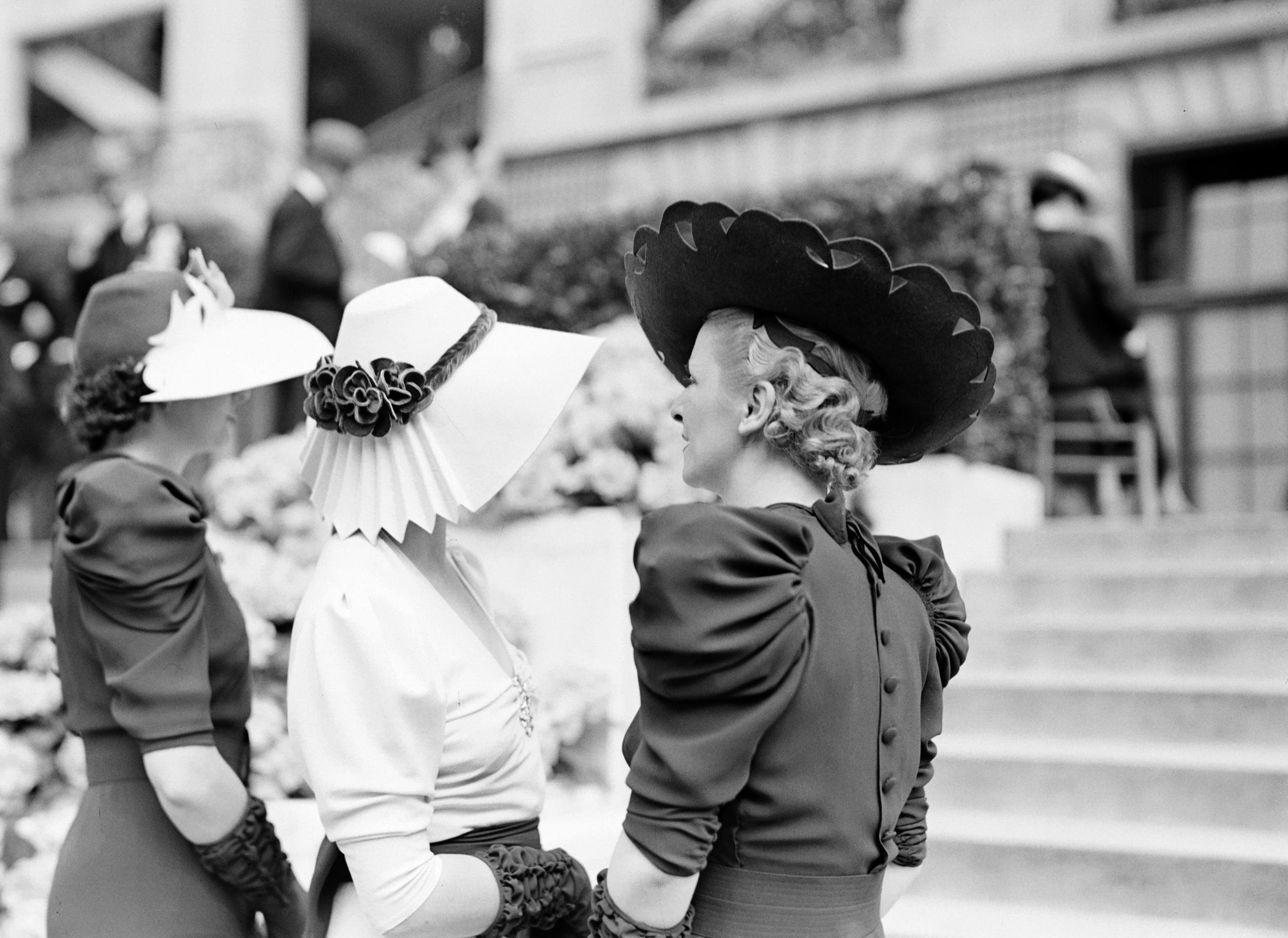
Three models in a fashion show for hats in Paris, 1936.

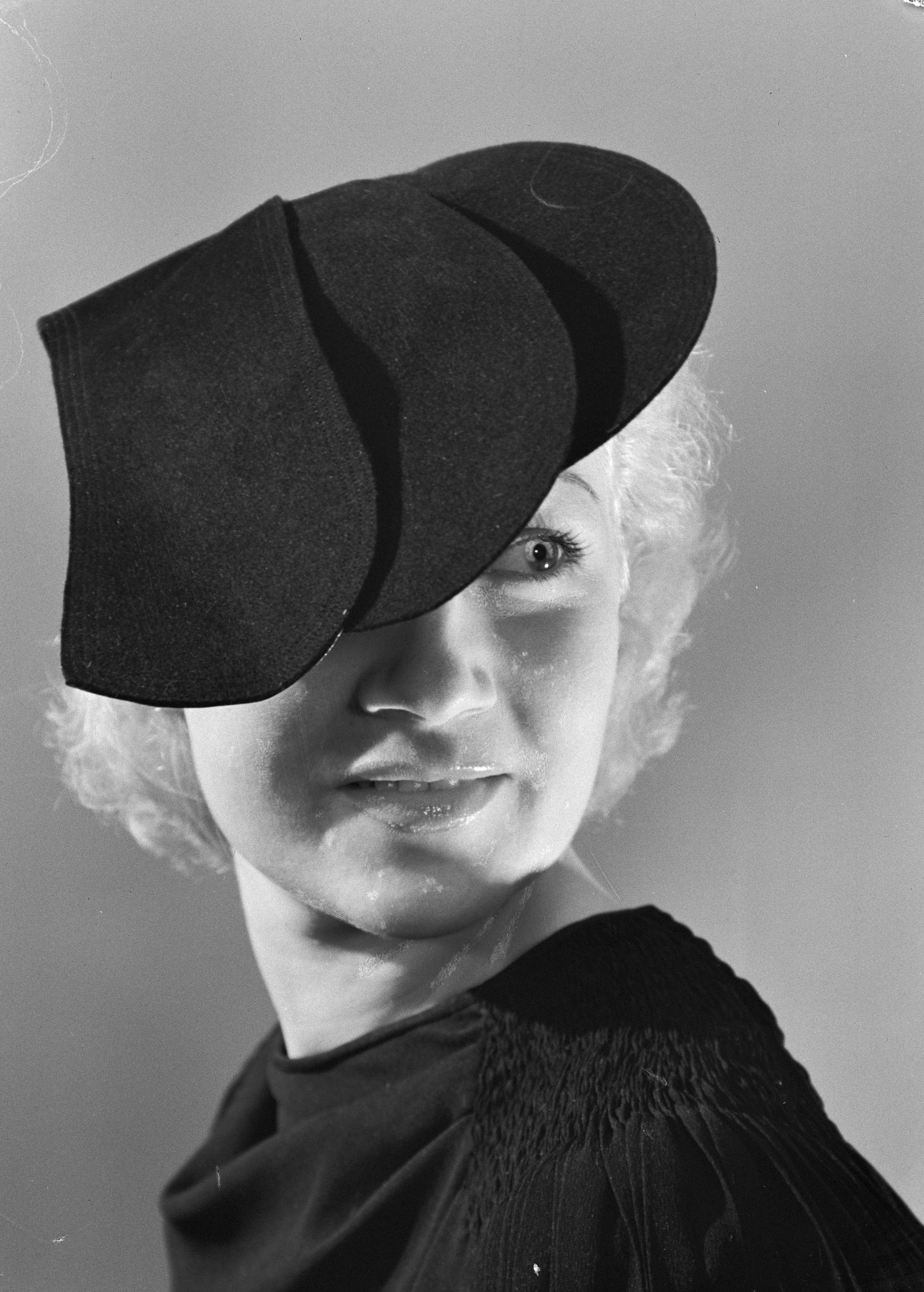
Parisian fashion shoot, 1936.

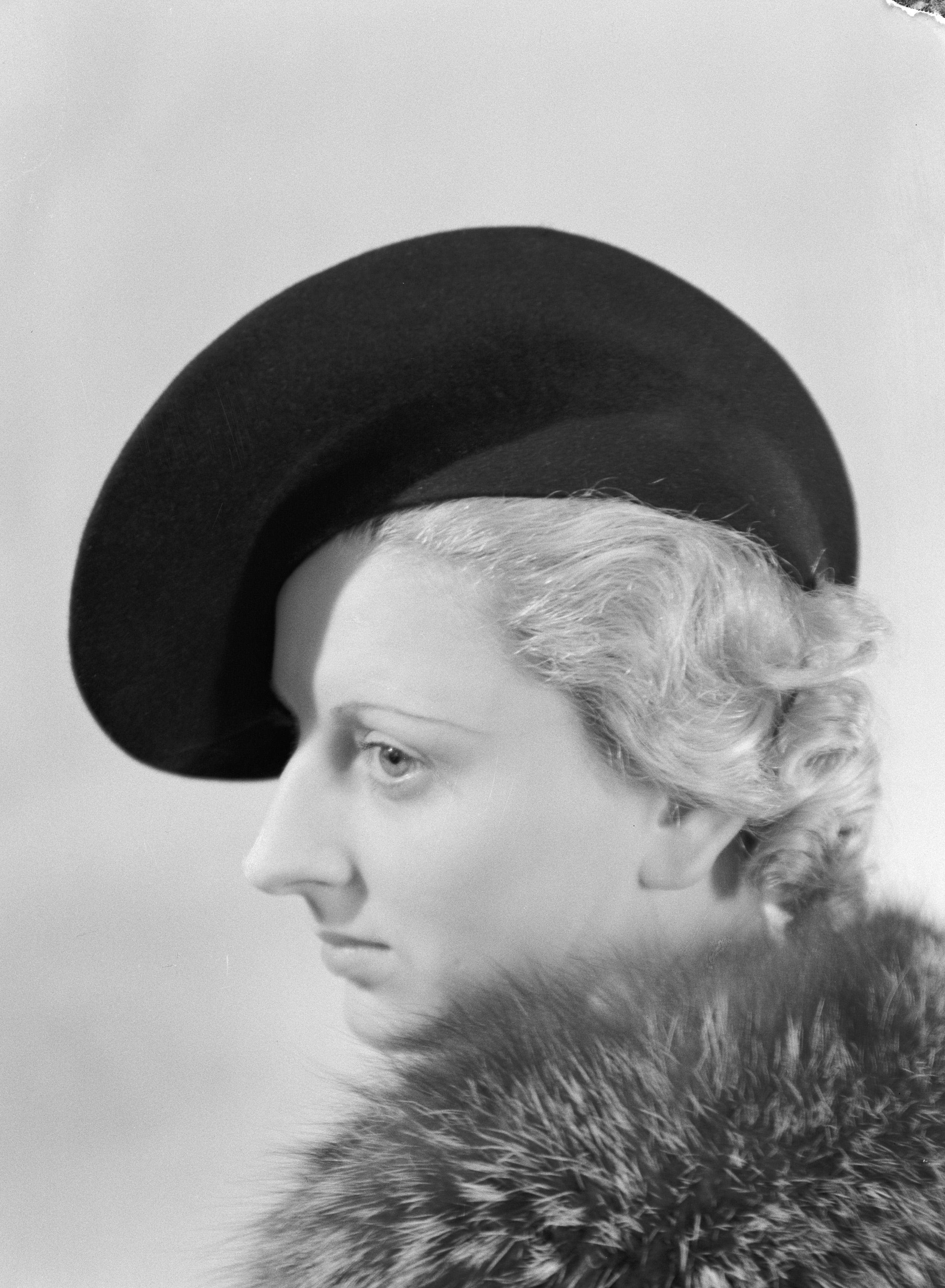
Parisian fashion shoot, 1936.

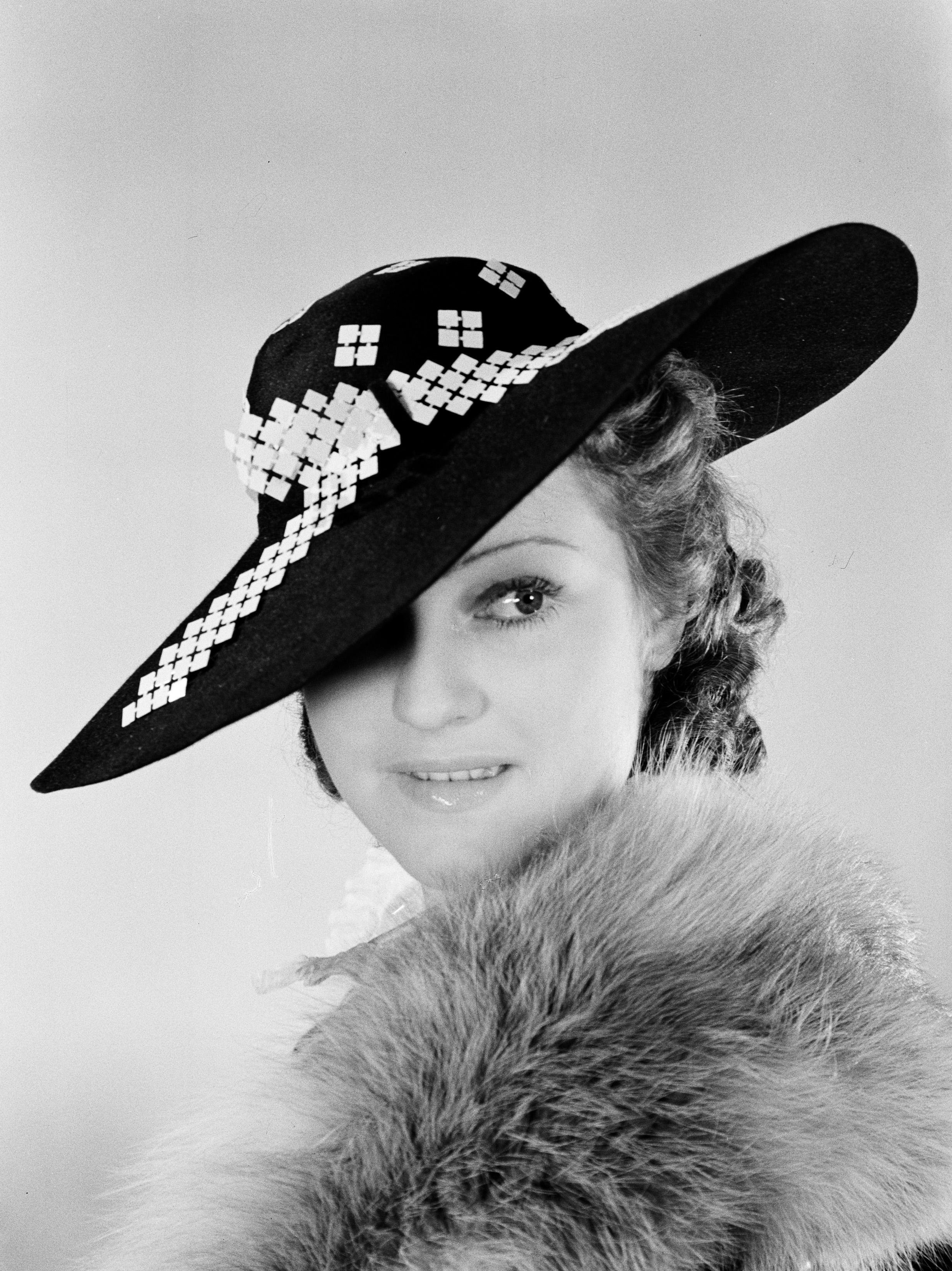
Parisian fashion shoot, 1936.

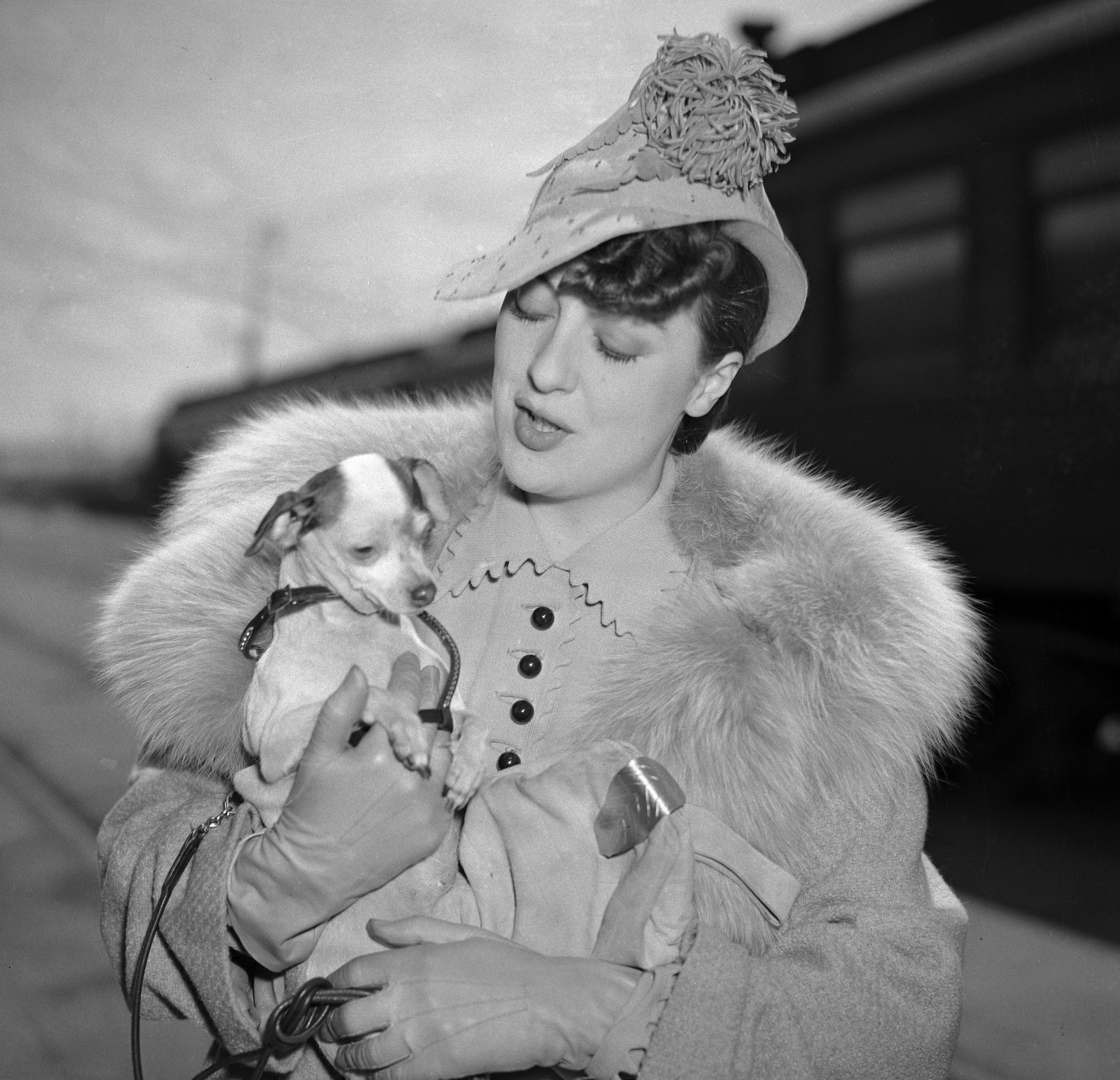
American entertainer Gypsy Rose Lee wearing a Eugénie hat, 1937.

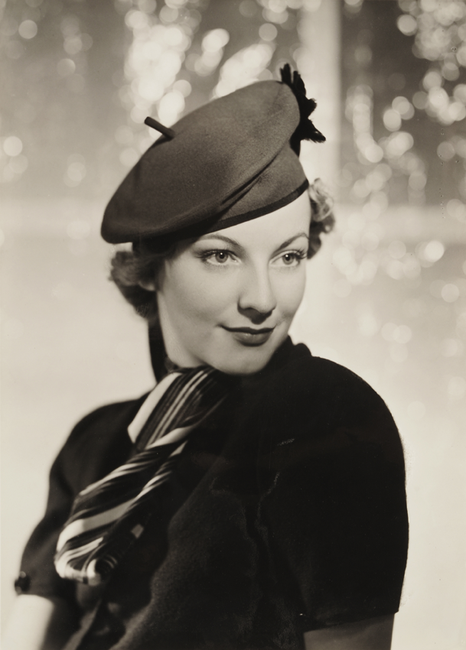
Berliner fashion shoot by Yva, c. 1938.

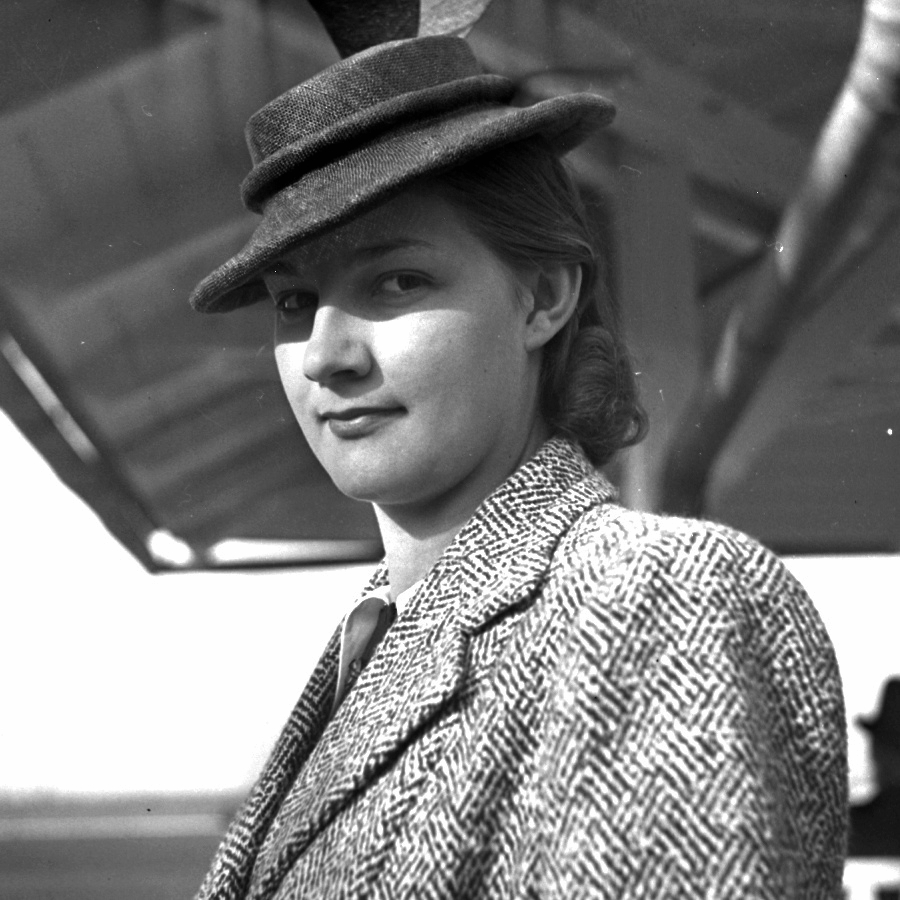
A woman in Budapest, 1938.

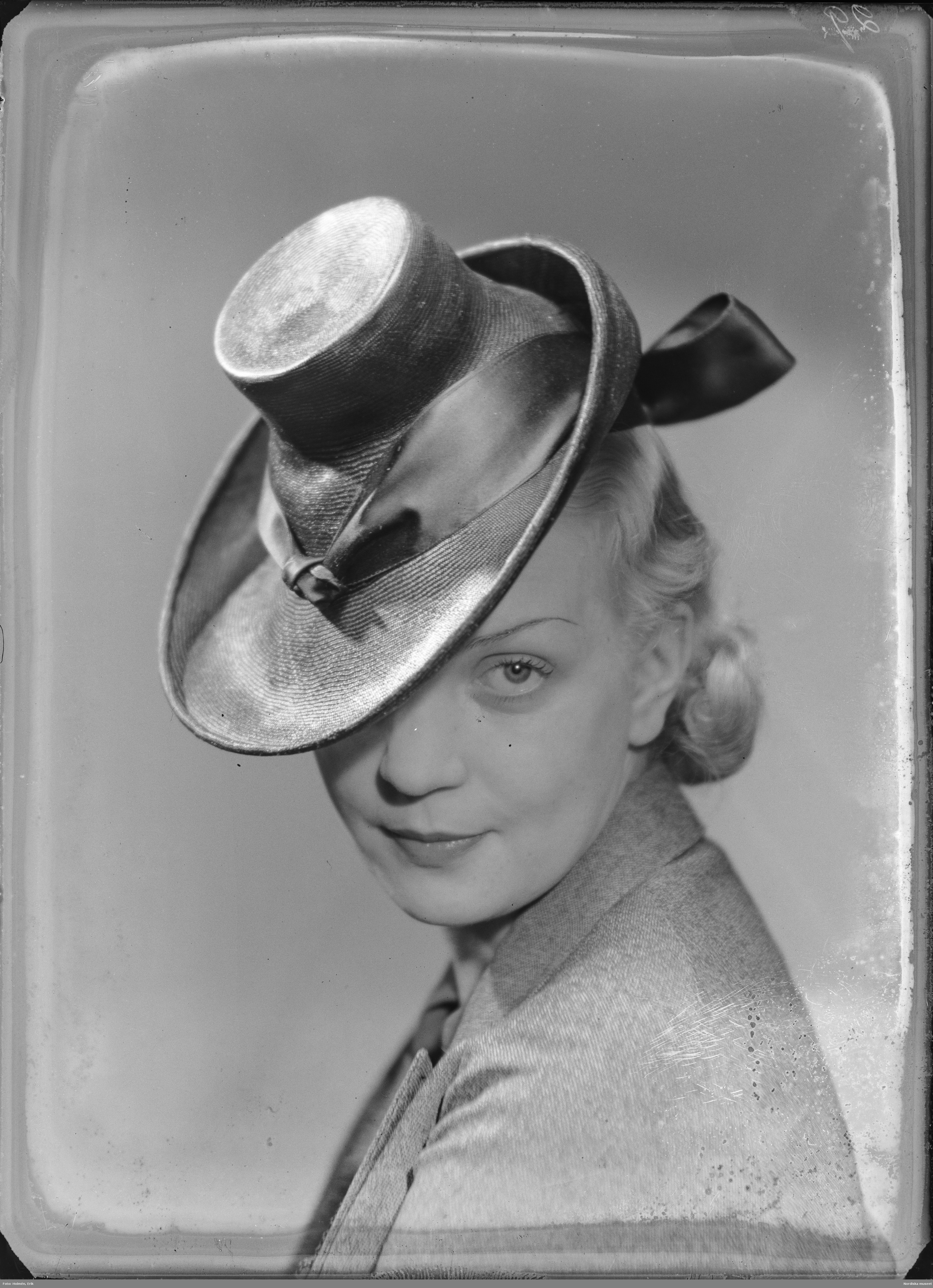
Swedish fashion shoot, 1939.

=== Style gallery: Women's shoes ===
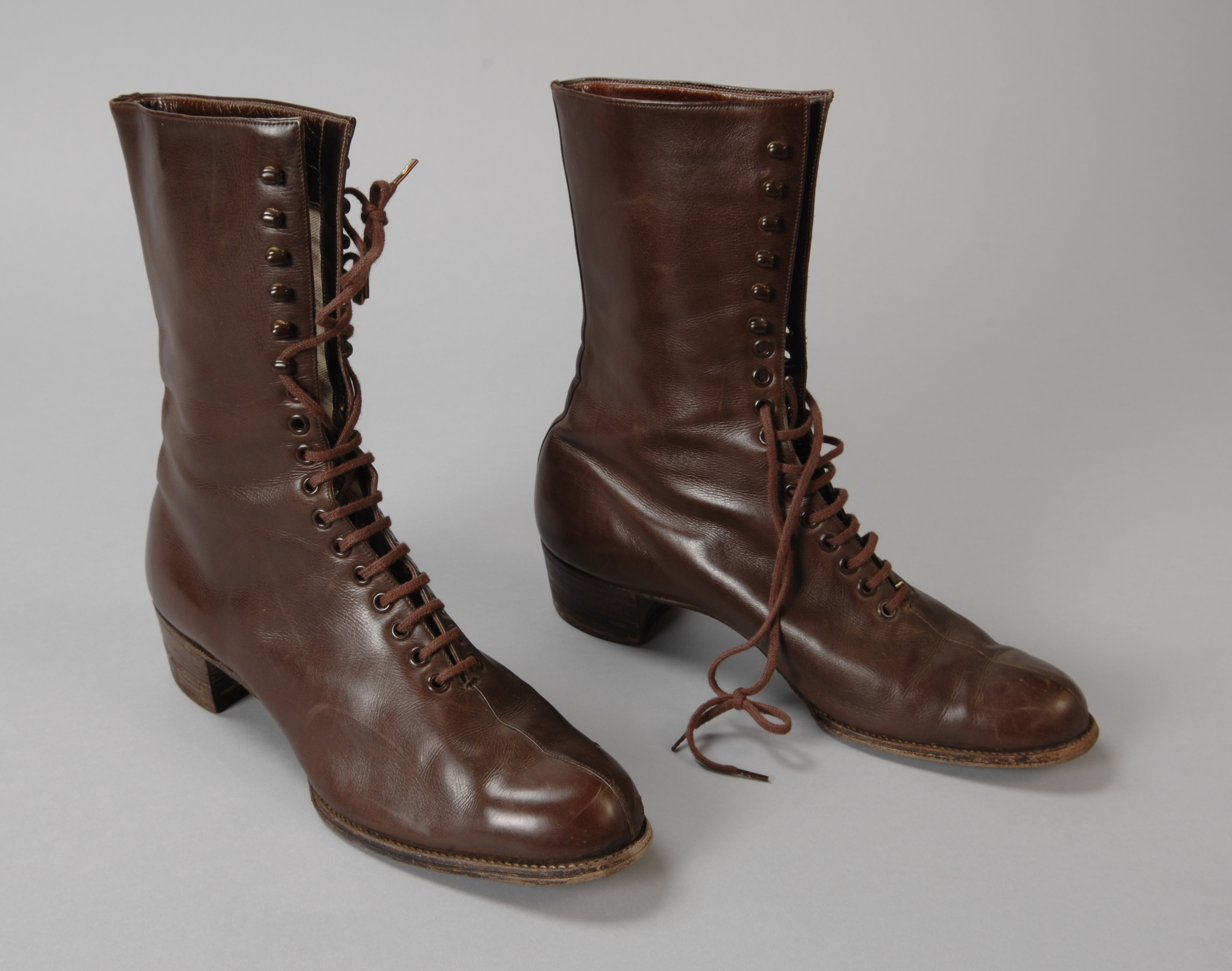
Calf-high lace-up boots in brown leather, c. 1925–1935.

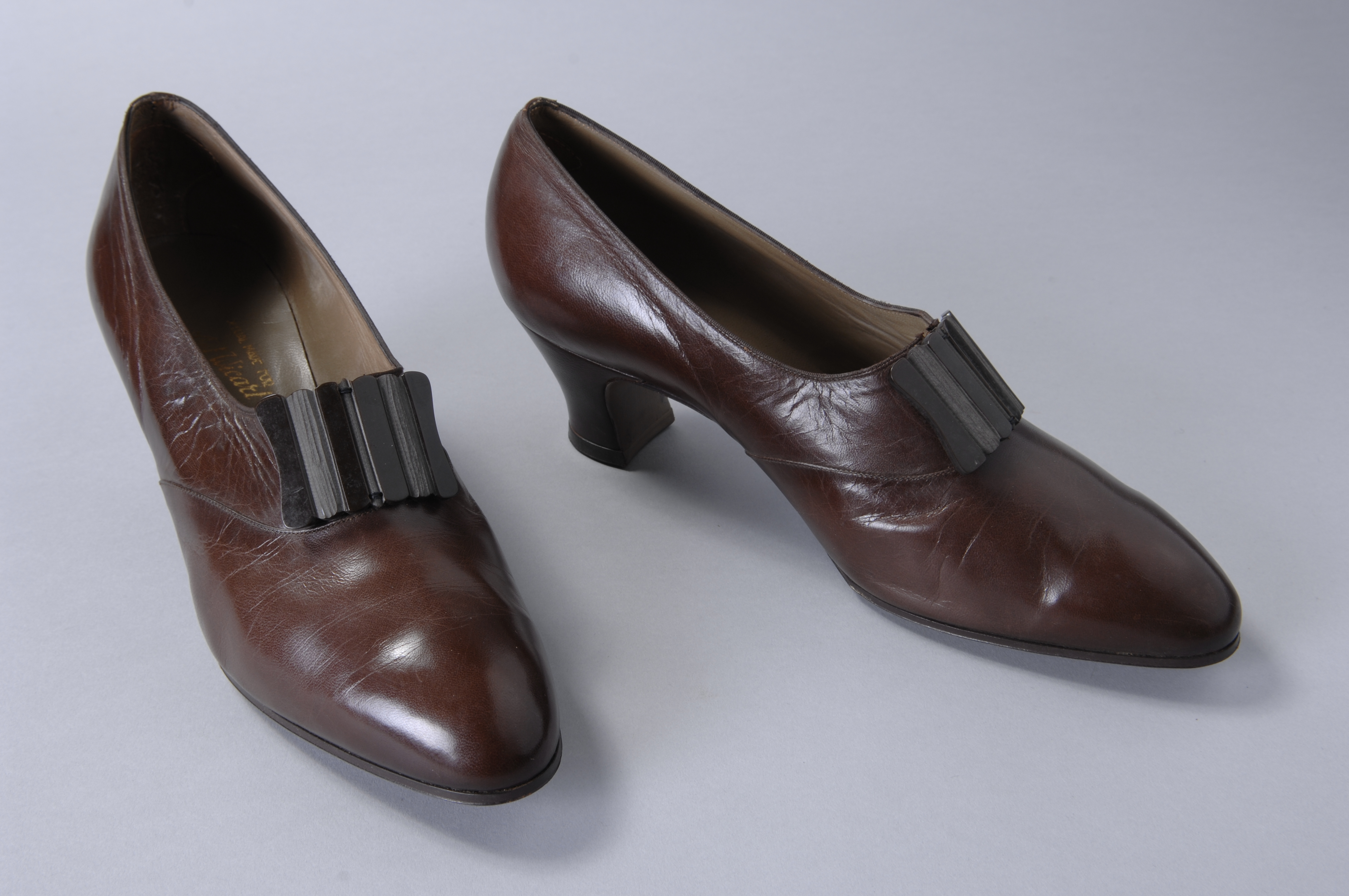
Brown leather shoes with decorative plastic buckle, c. 1930–1932.

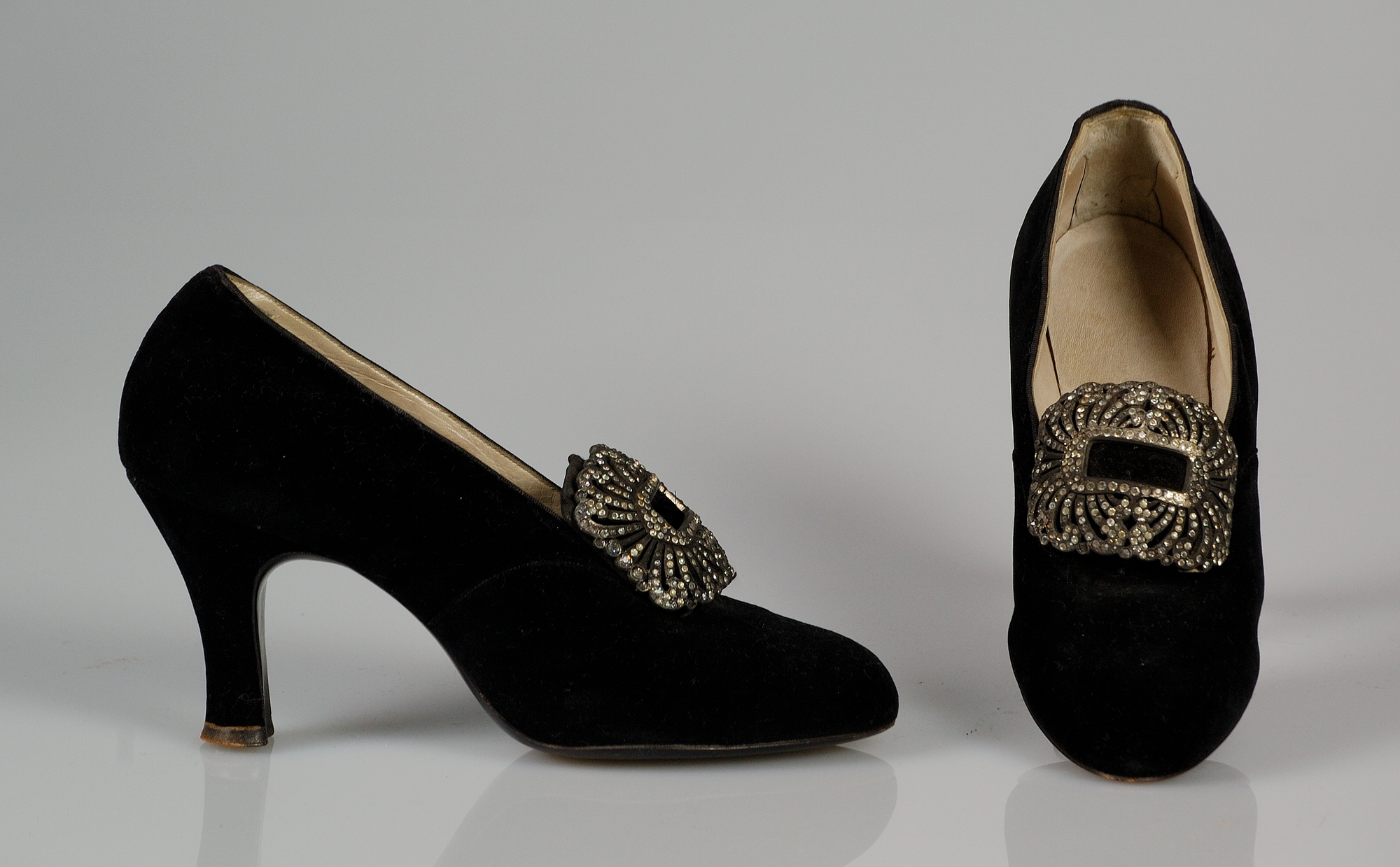
Silk shoes with rhinestone decoration, c. 1932.

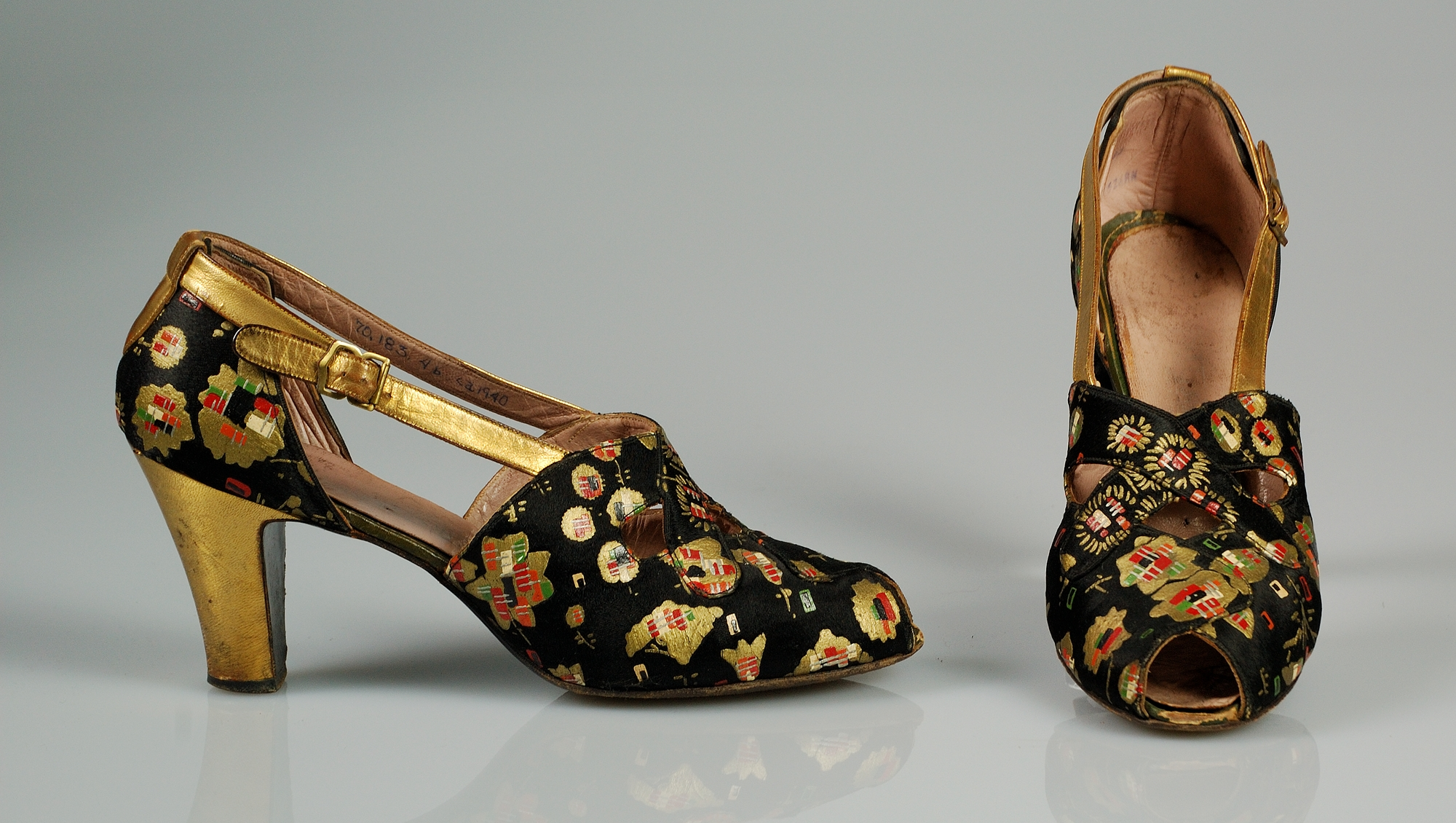
Silk and leather evening shoes, c. 1933.

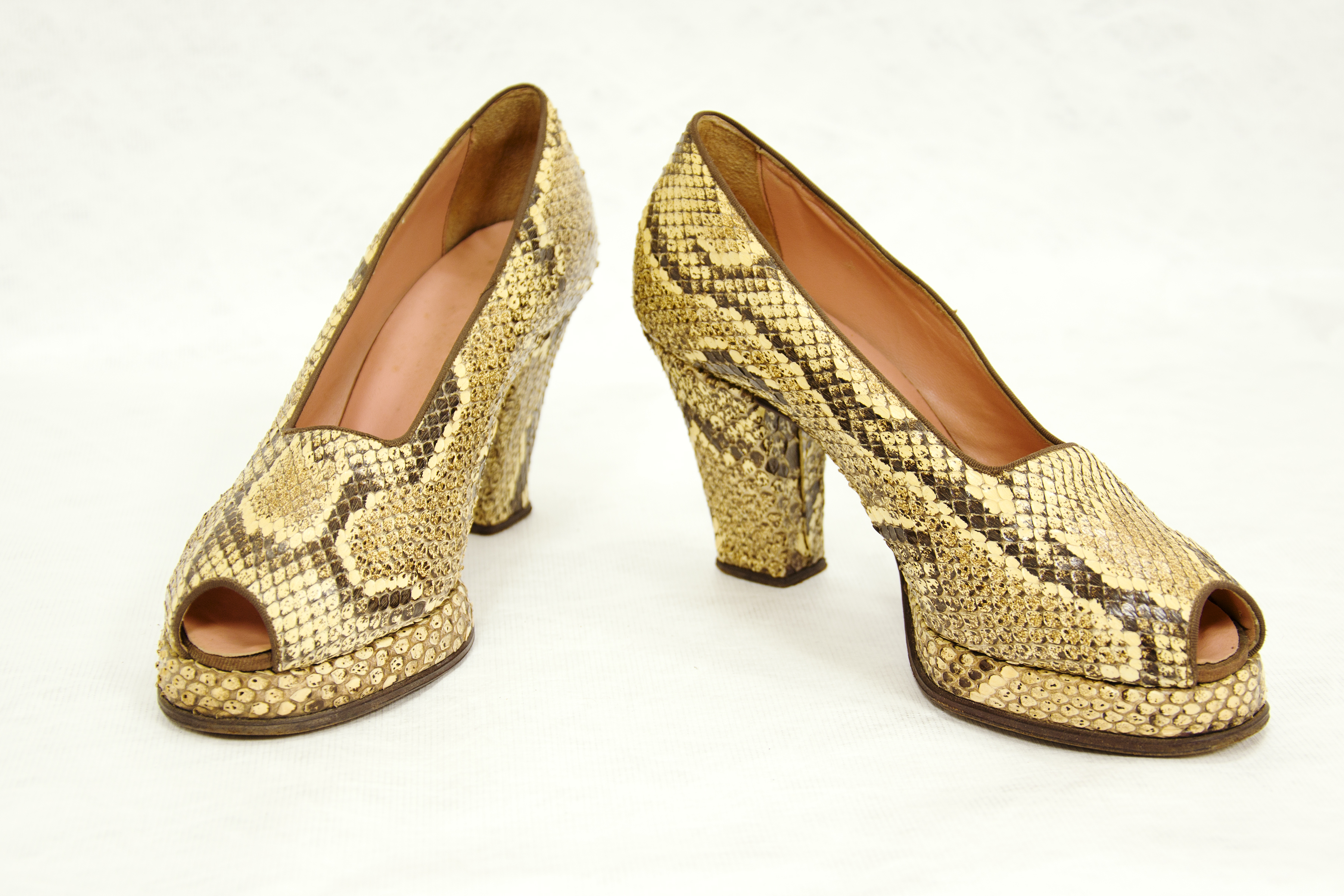
High heeled platform shoes covered in snakeskin leather, c. 1930s.

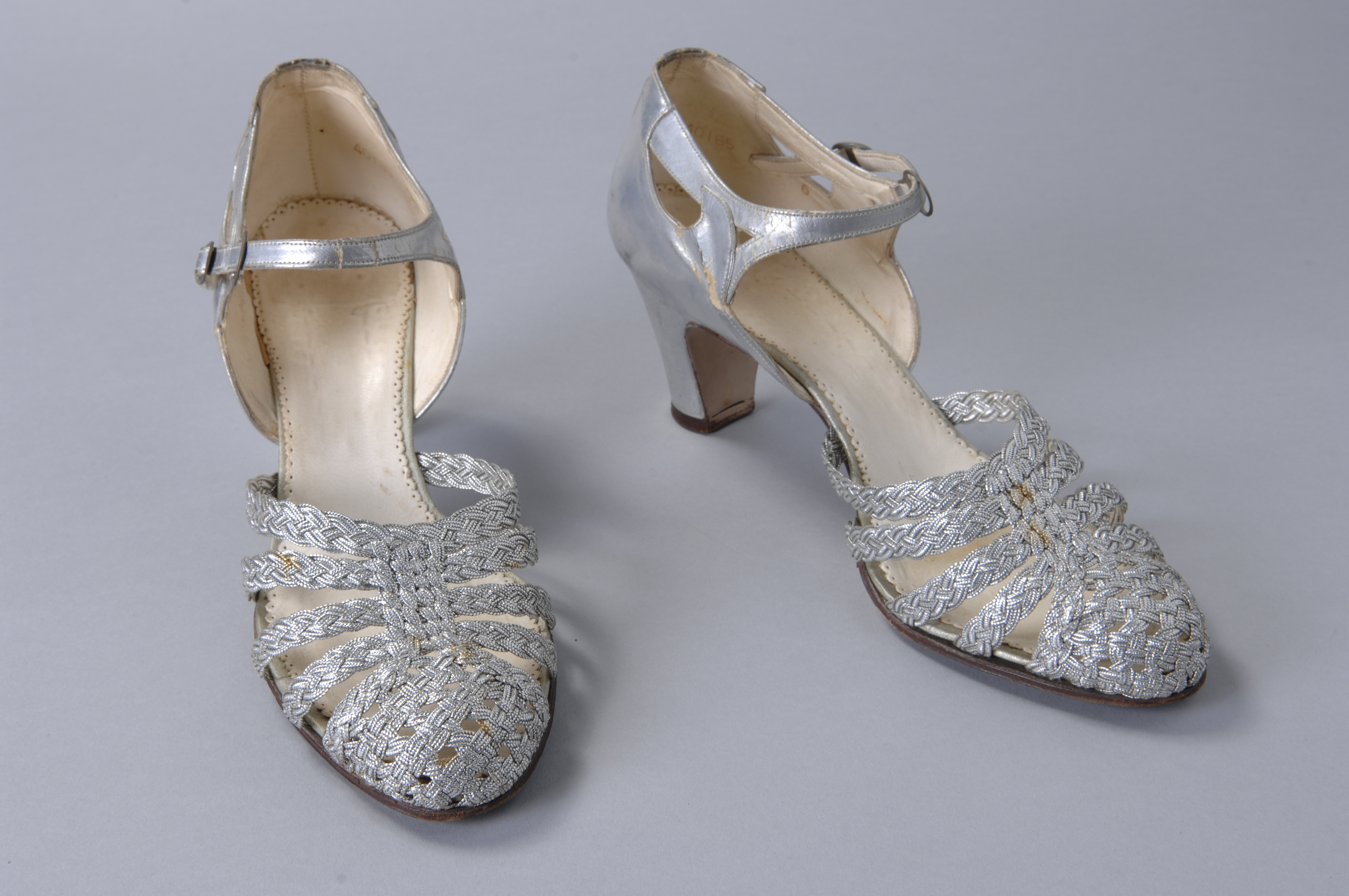
Silver dancing shoes, c. 1935–1940.

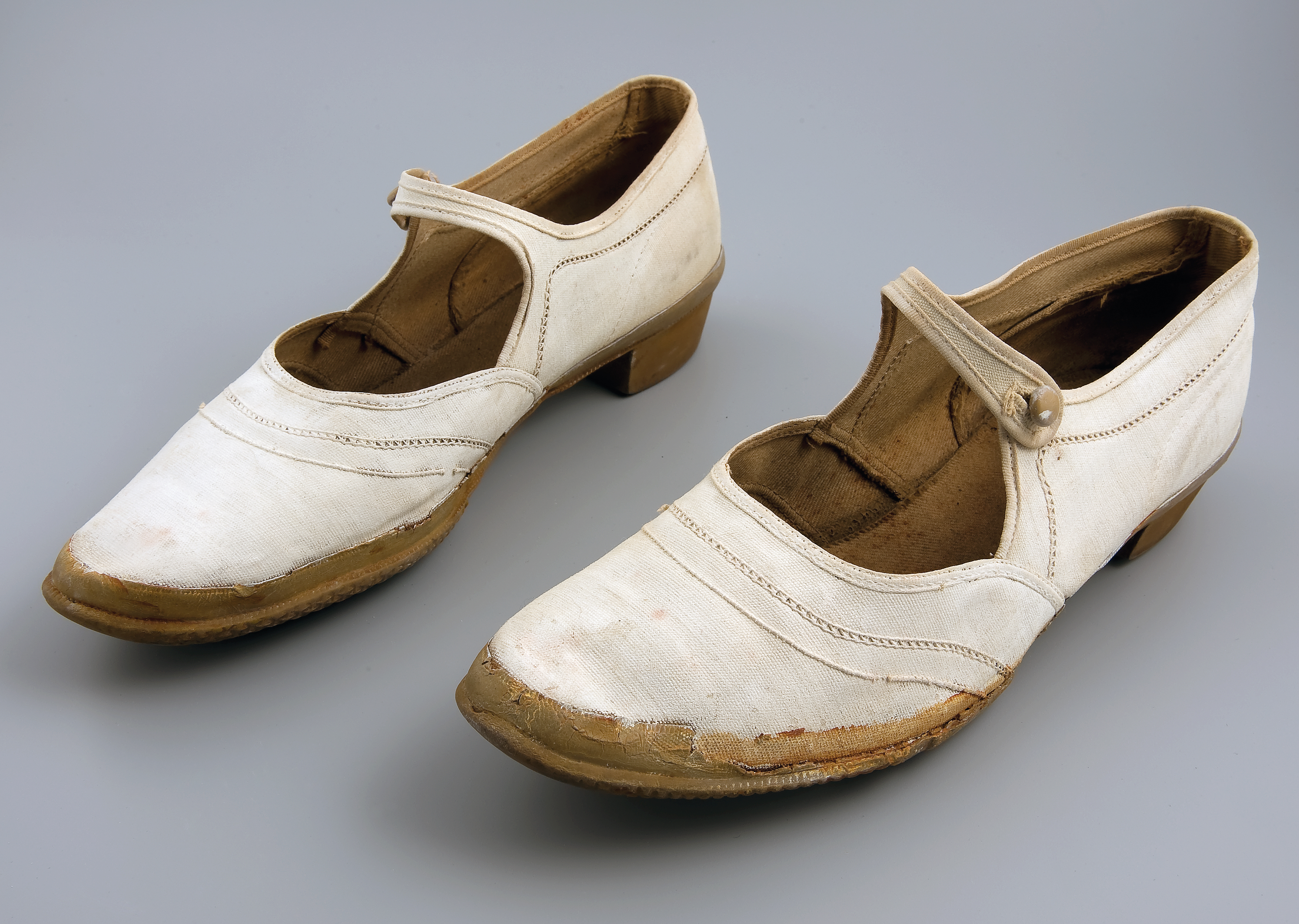
White linen summer shoes, c. 1935–1940.

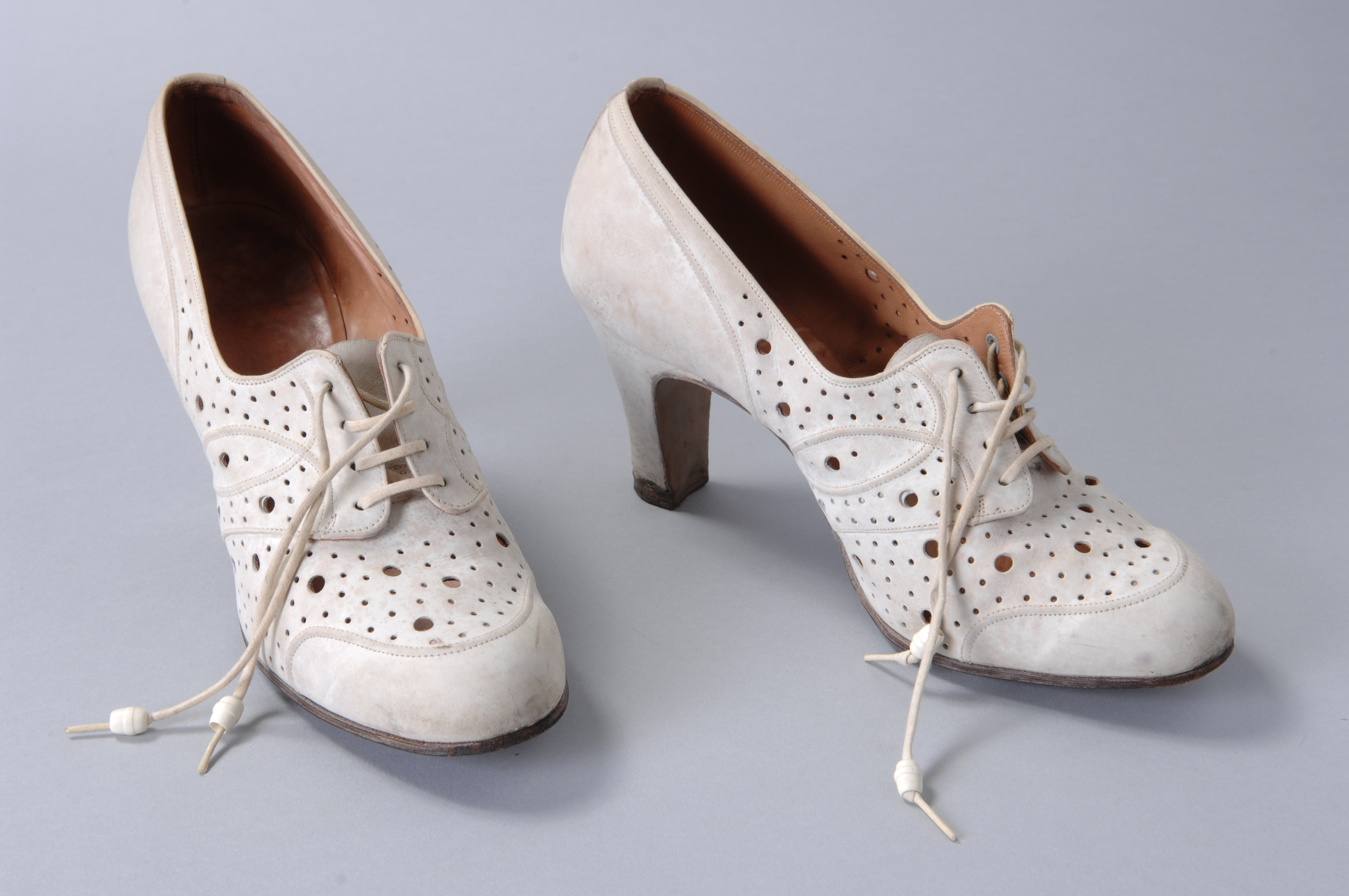
White nubuck lace-up shoes with decorative holes, c. 1935–1940.

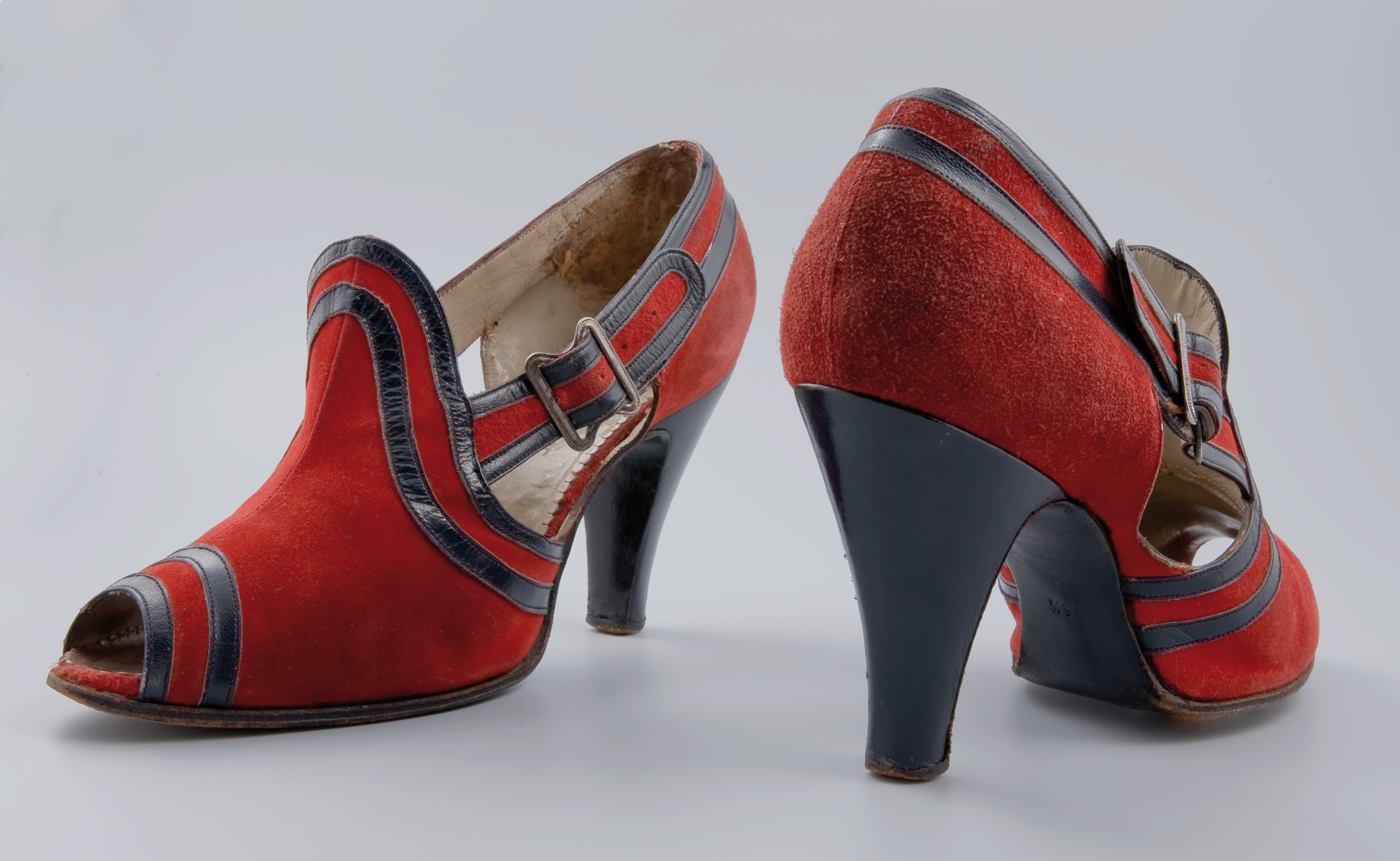
Red suede shoes with dark blue leather trims, c. 1938–1940.

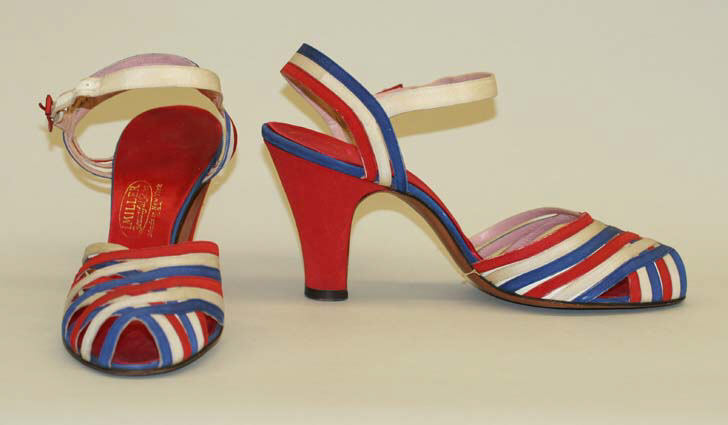
Leather sandals, c. 1938.

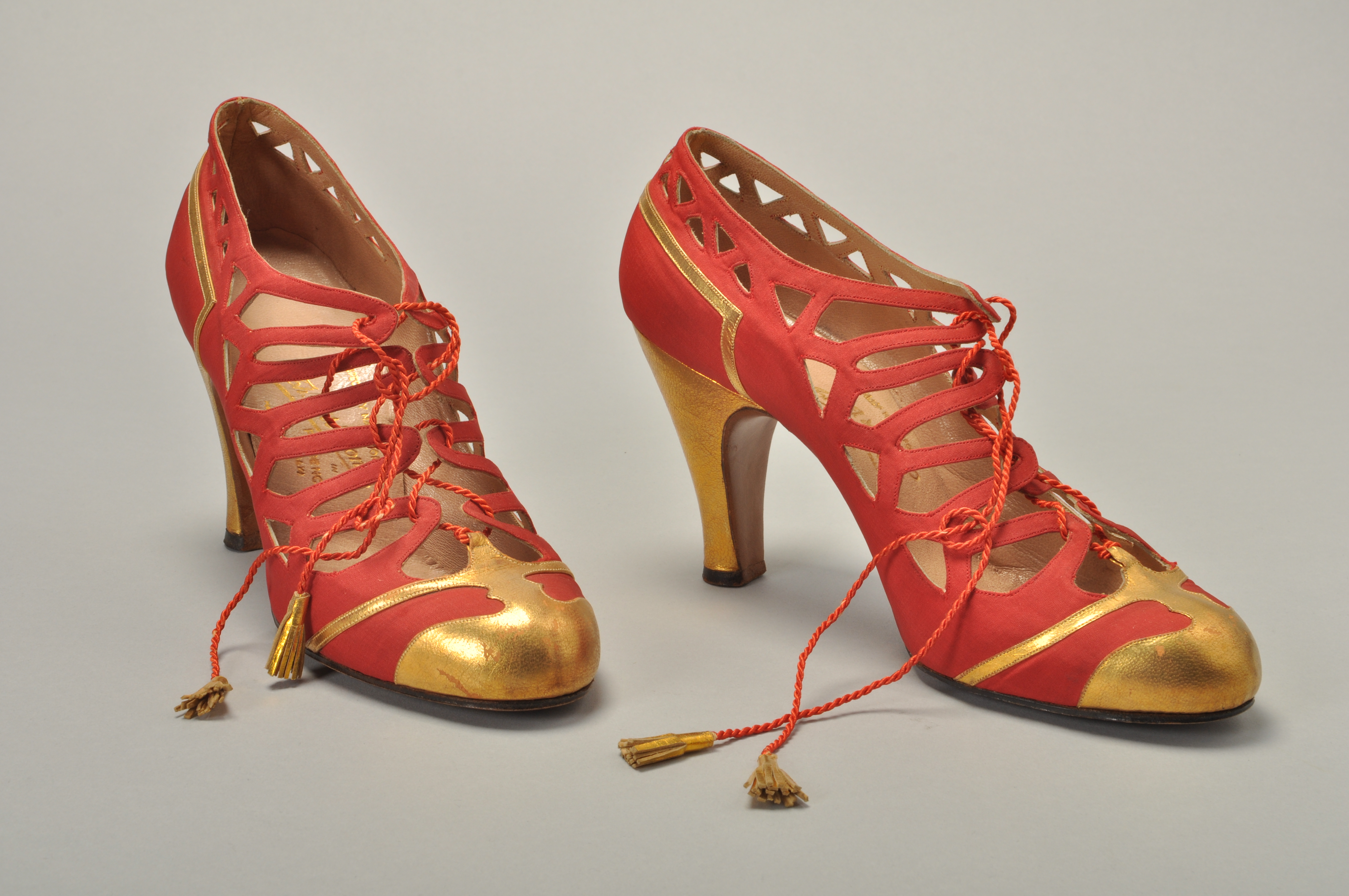
Leather evening shoes, featuring drawstrings with tassels, c. 1938–1940.

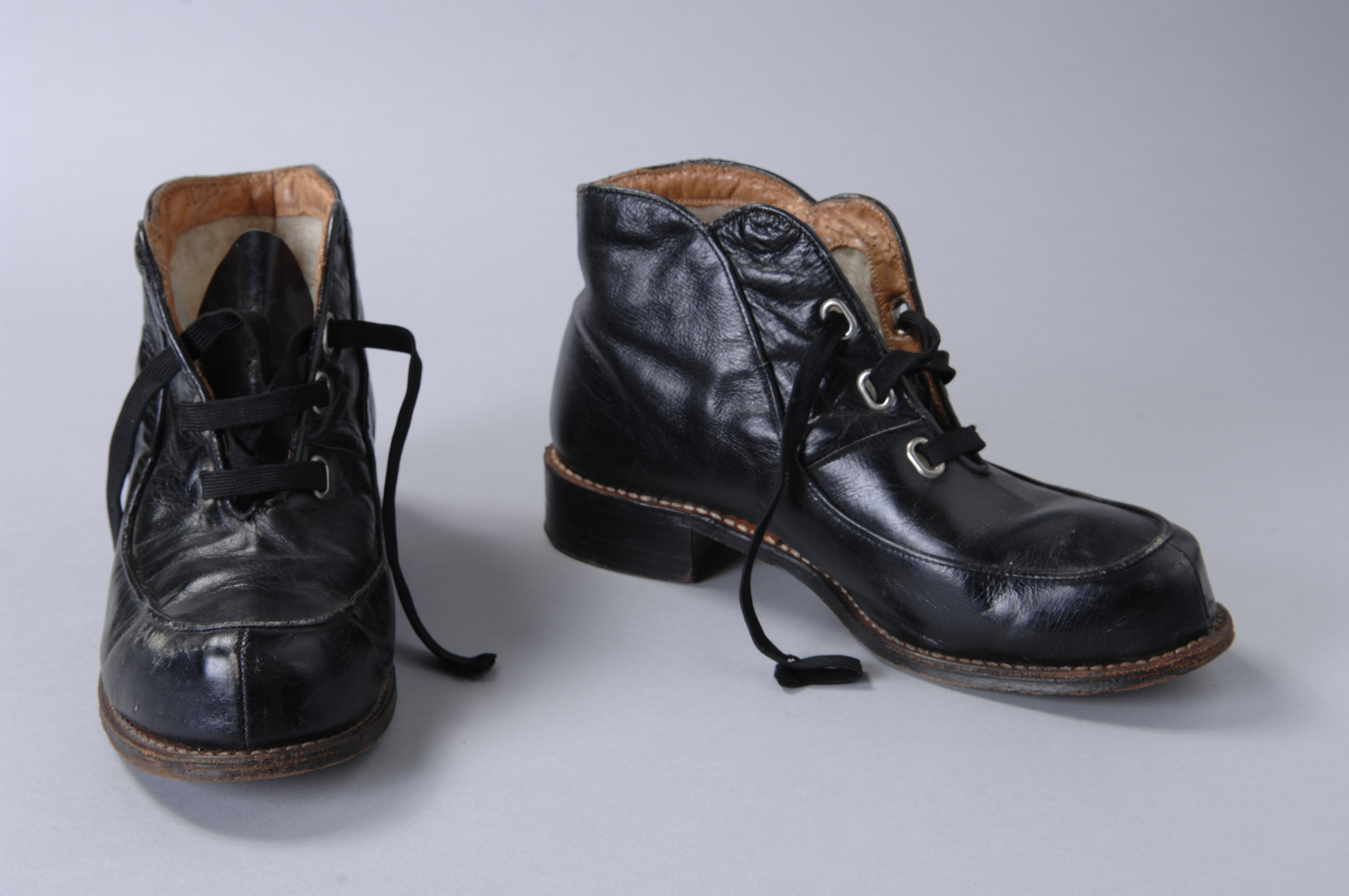
Black leather lace-up ankle boots, c. 1938–1940.

=== Style gallery: Men's fashion ===
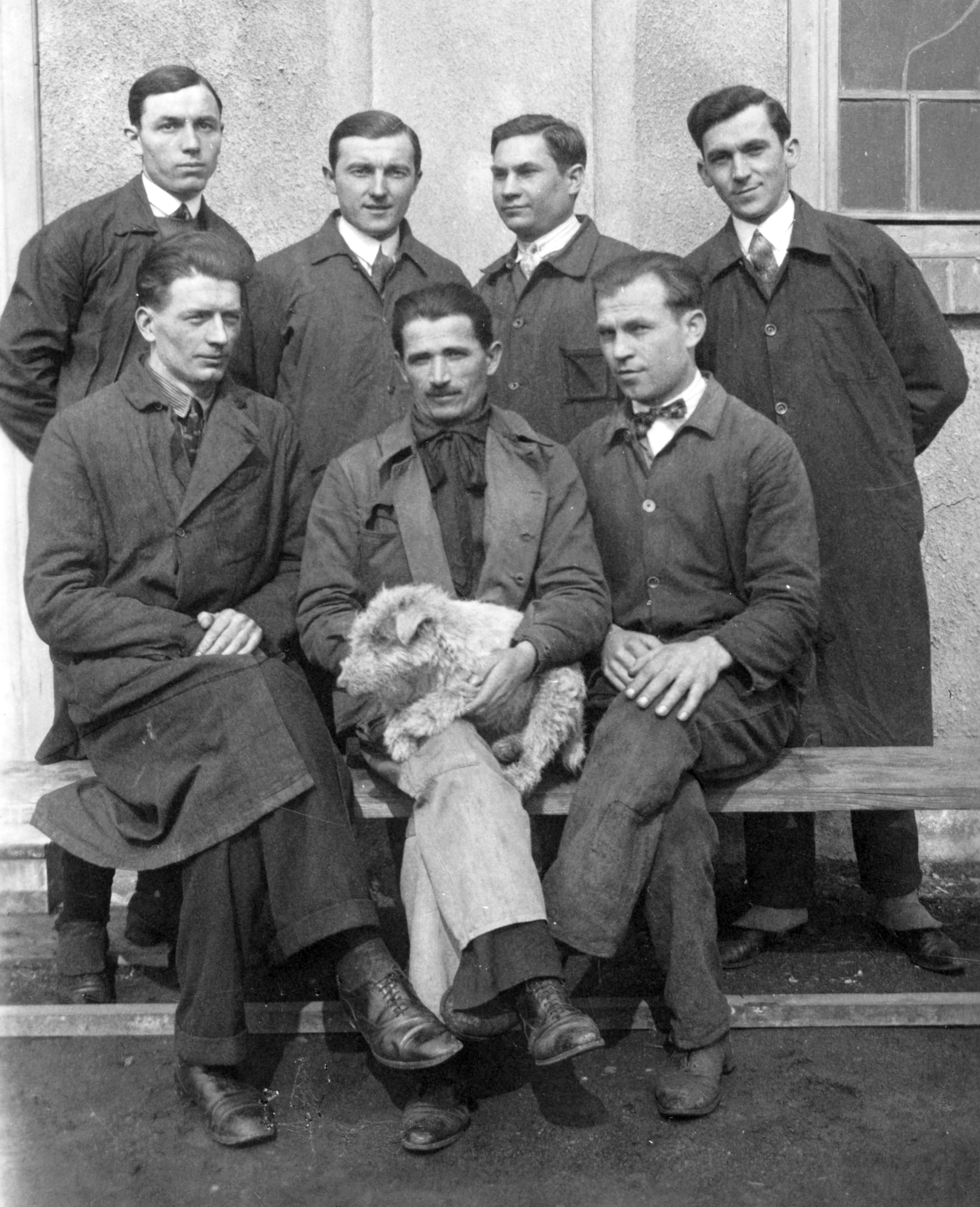
A group of men in Hungary, 1930.

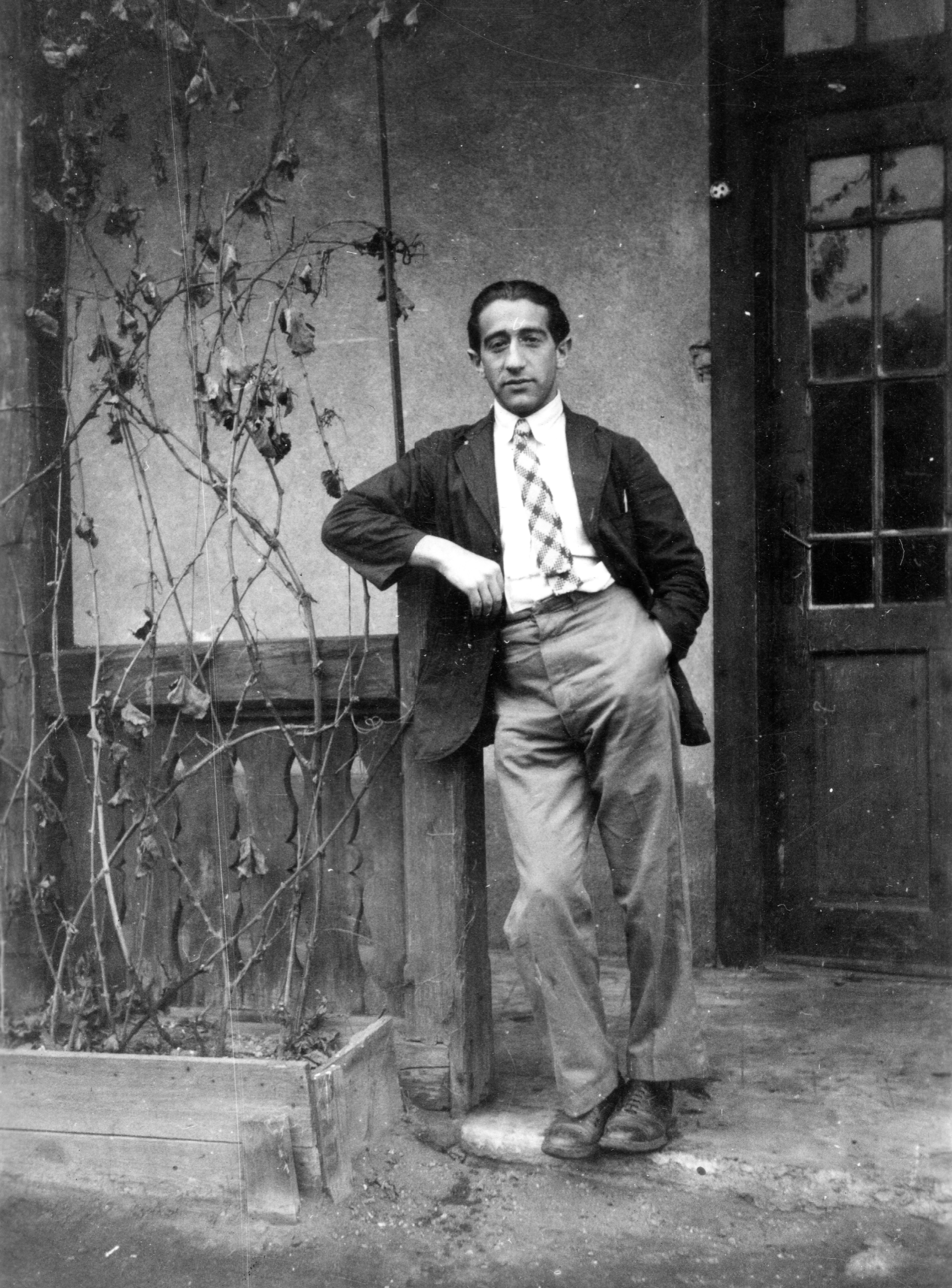
A man in Hungary, 1930.

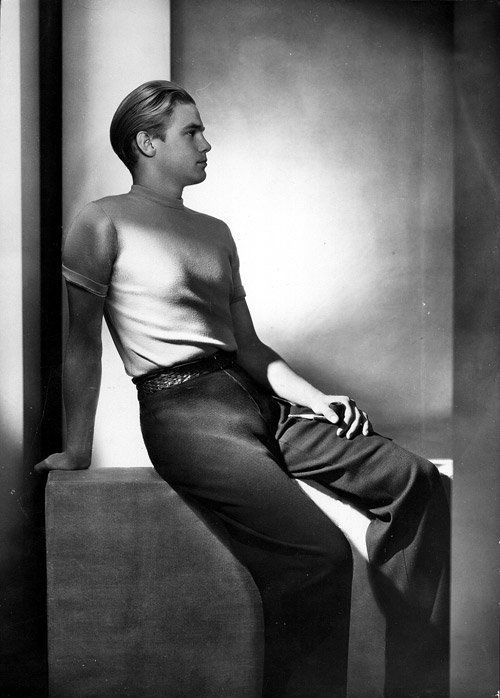
A fashion shoot by Yva, c. 1932.

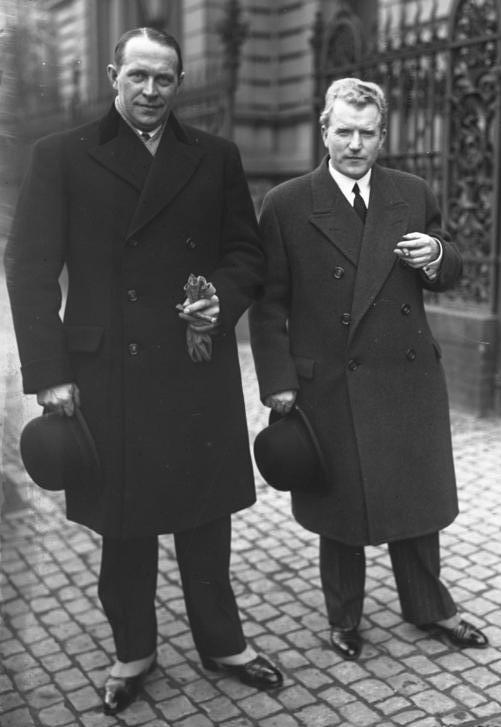
Lithuanian diplomats Dovas Zaunius and Vaclovas Sidzikauskas, 1932.

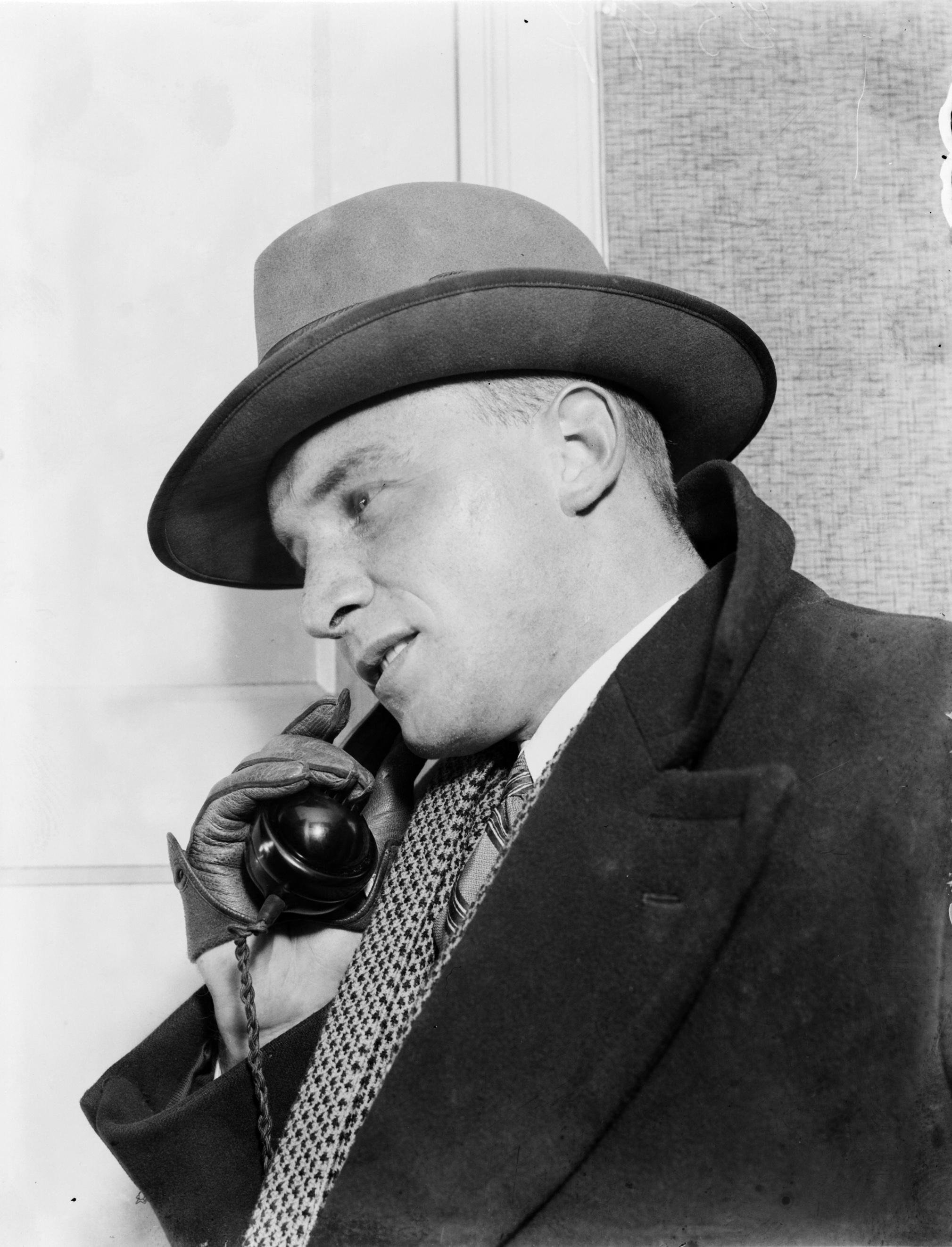
A young man in Amsterdam, 1932.

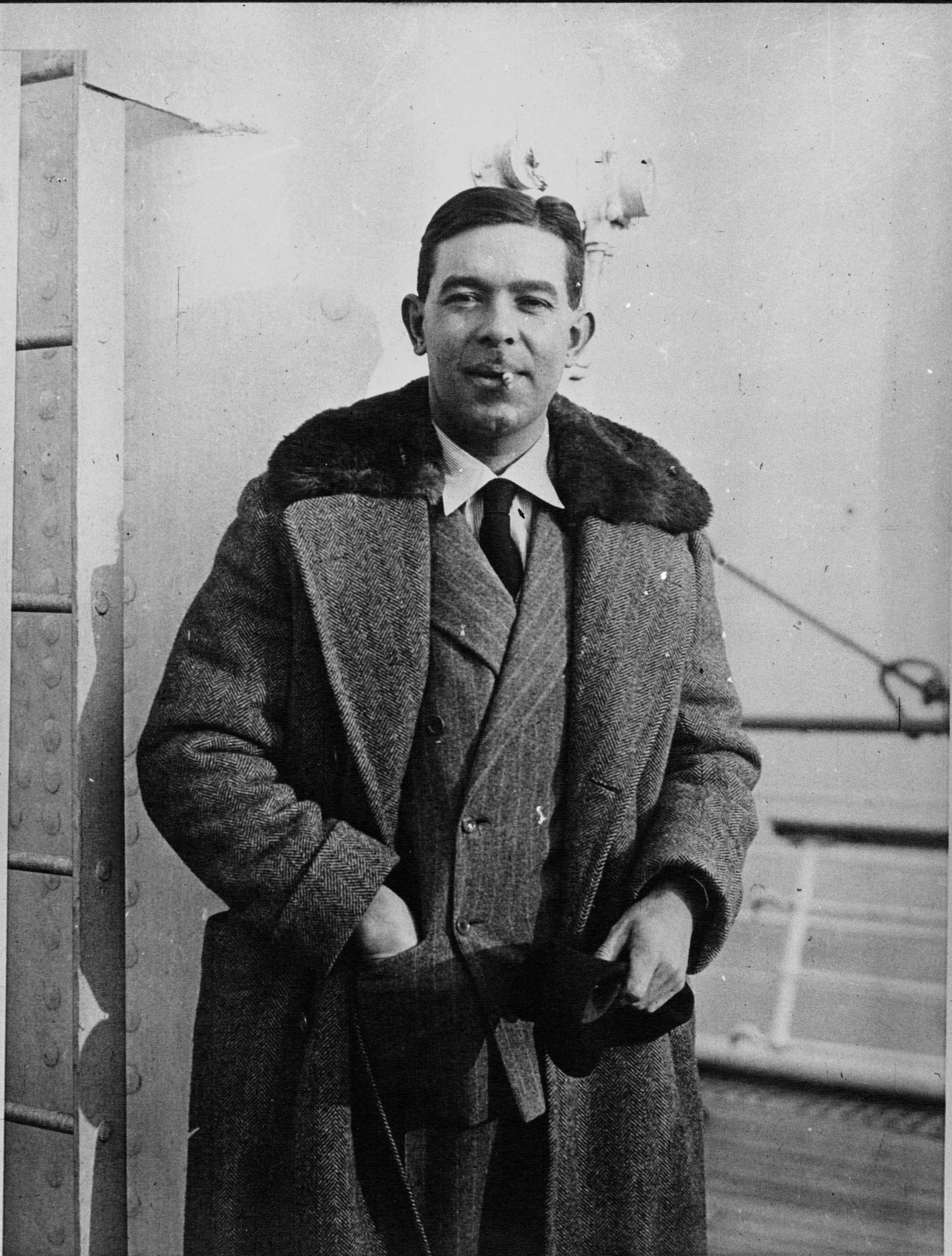
French athlete André Dubonnet in 1933.

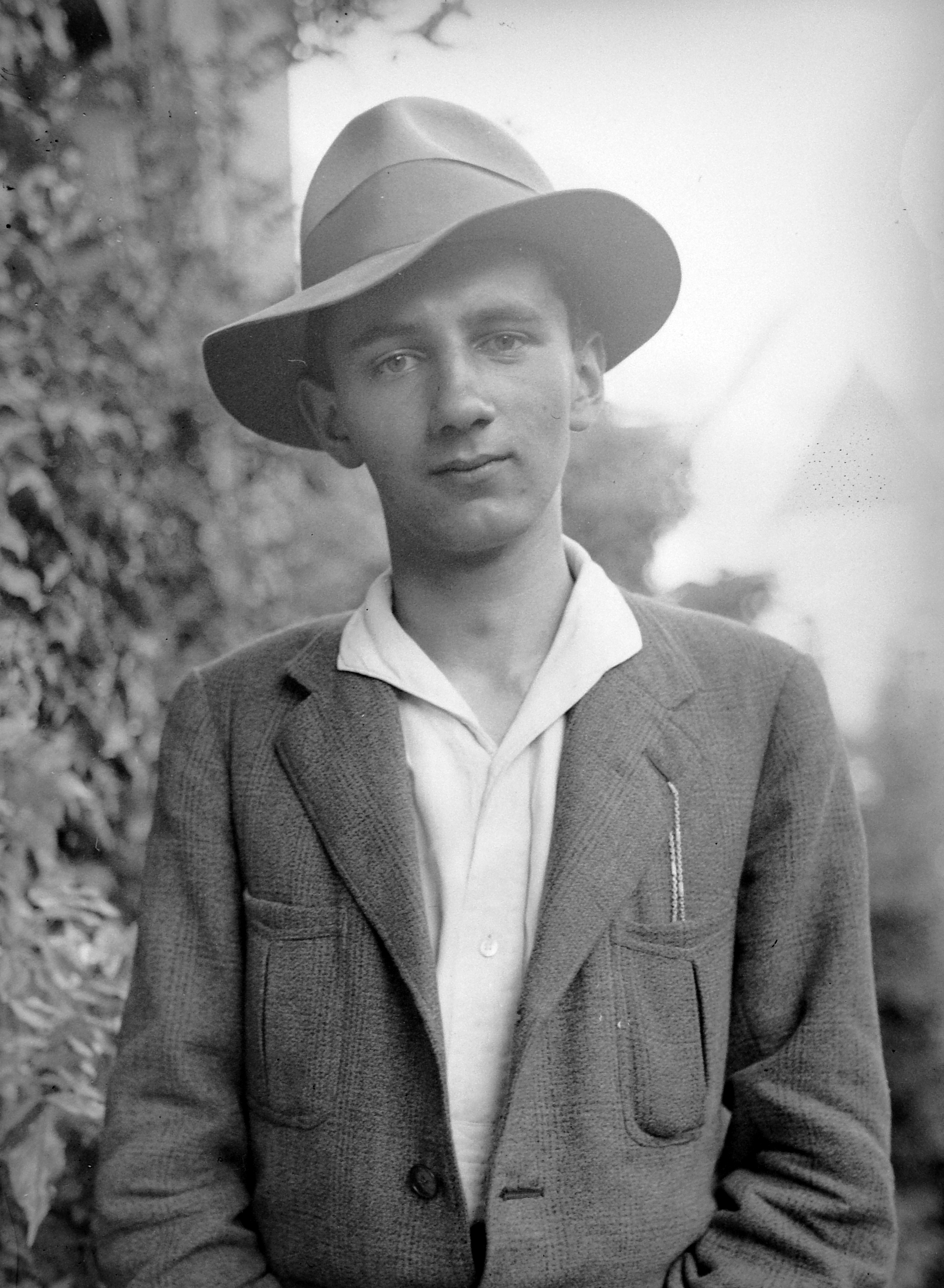
A young man in Hungary, 1933.

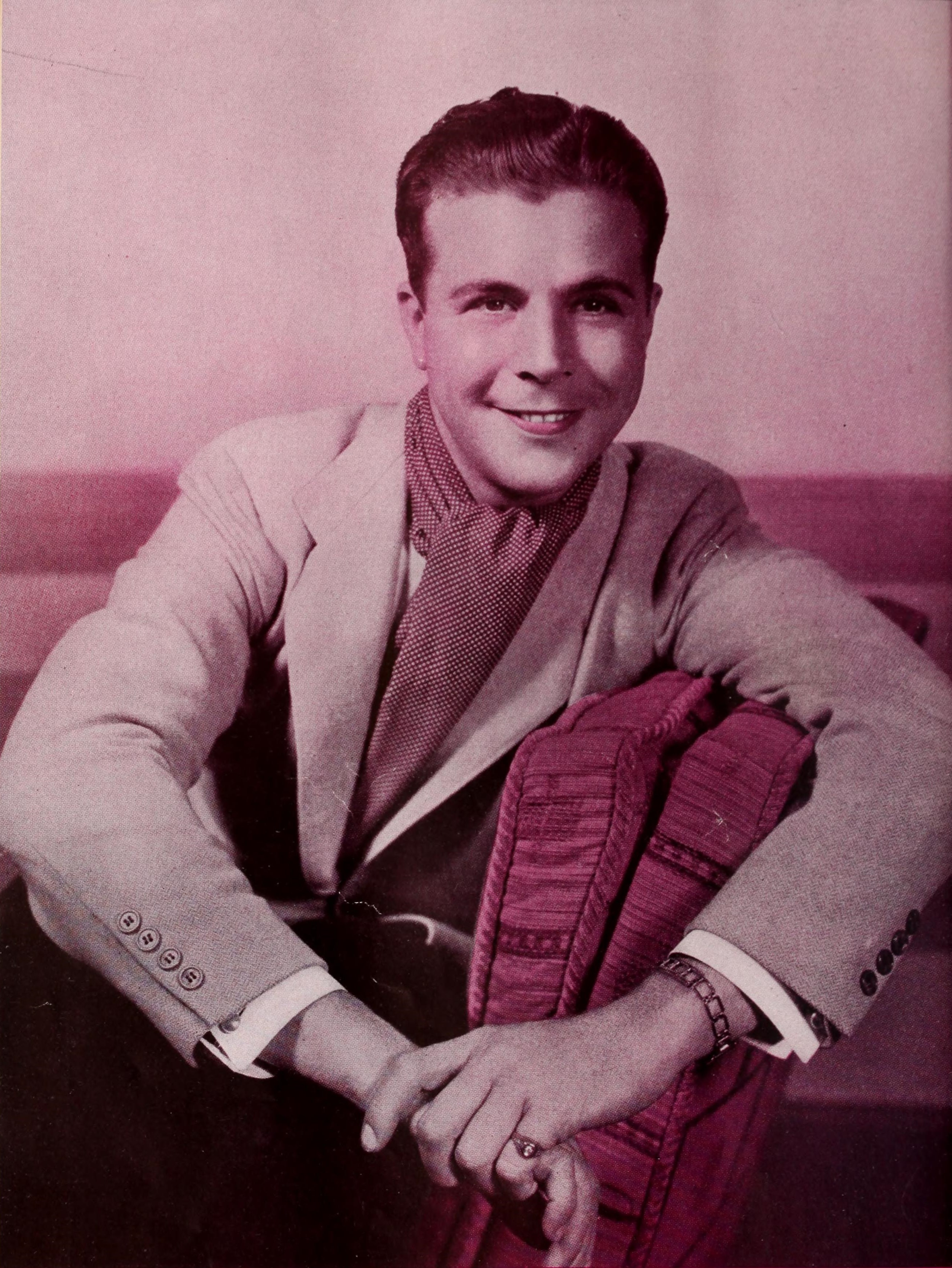
Dick Powell in Radio Stars magazine, 1934.

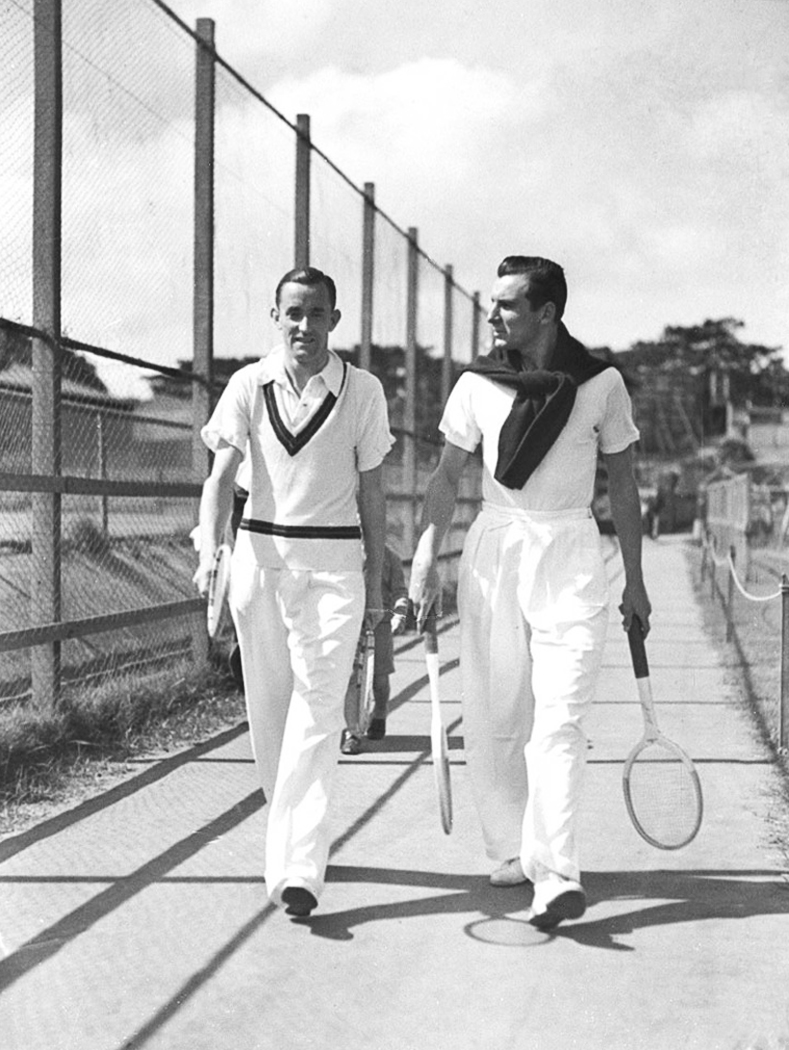
Tennis players Pat Hughes and Fred Perry at White City Stadium in Sydney, 1934.

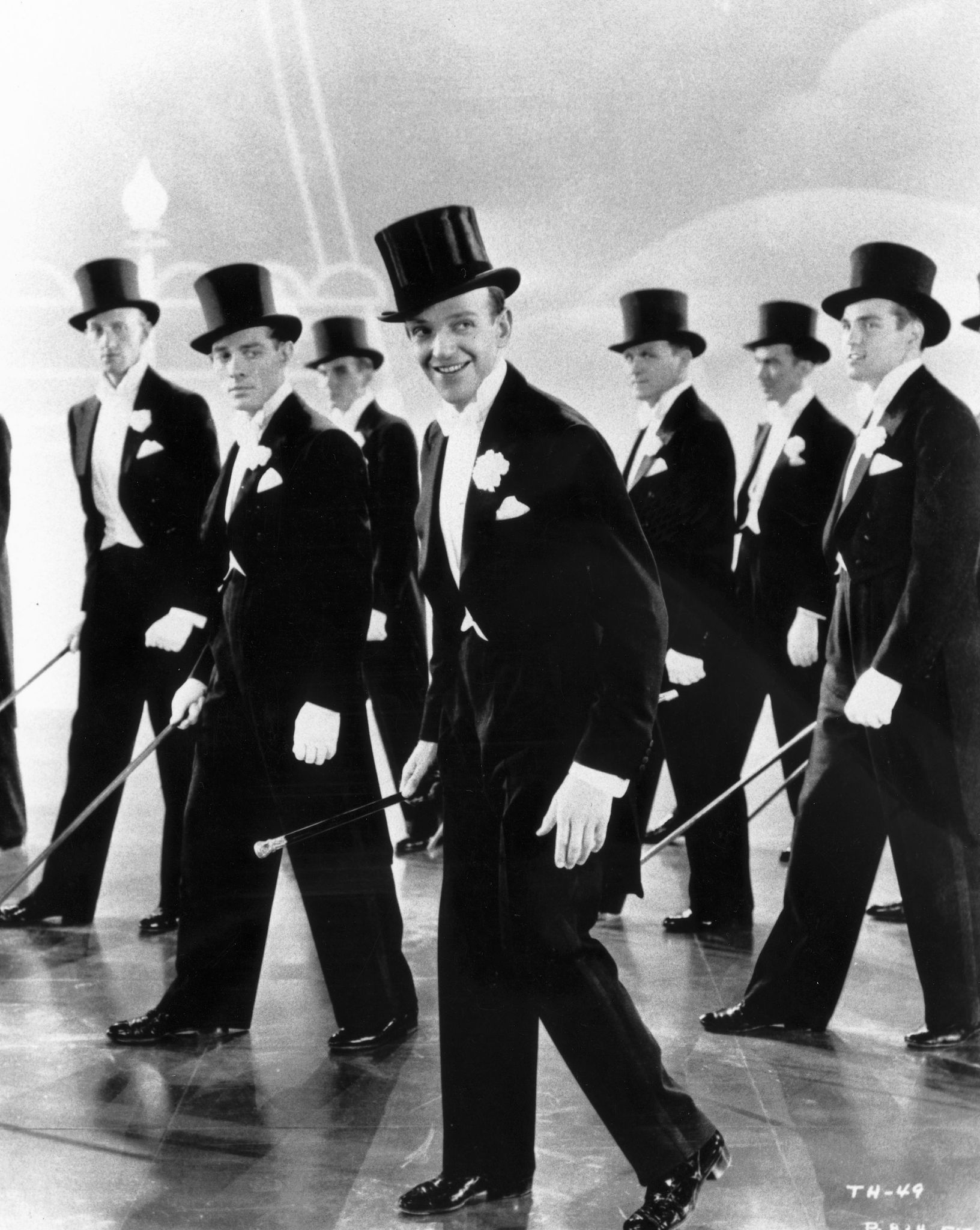
Fred Astaire and backup dancers in the 1935 film Top Hat, dressed in white tie.

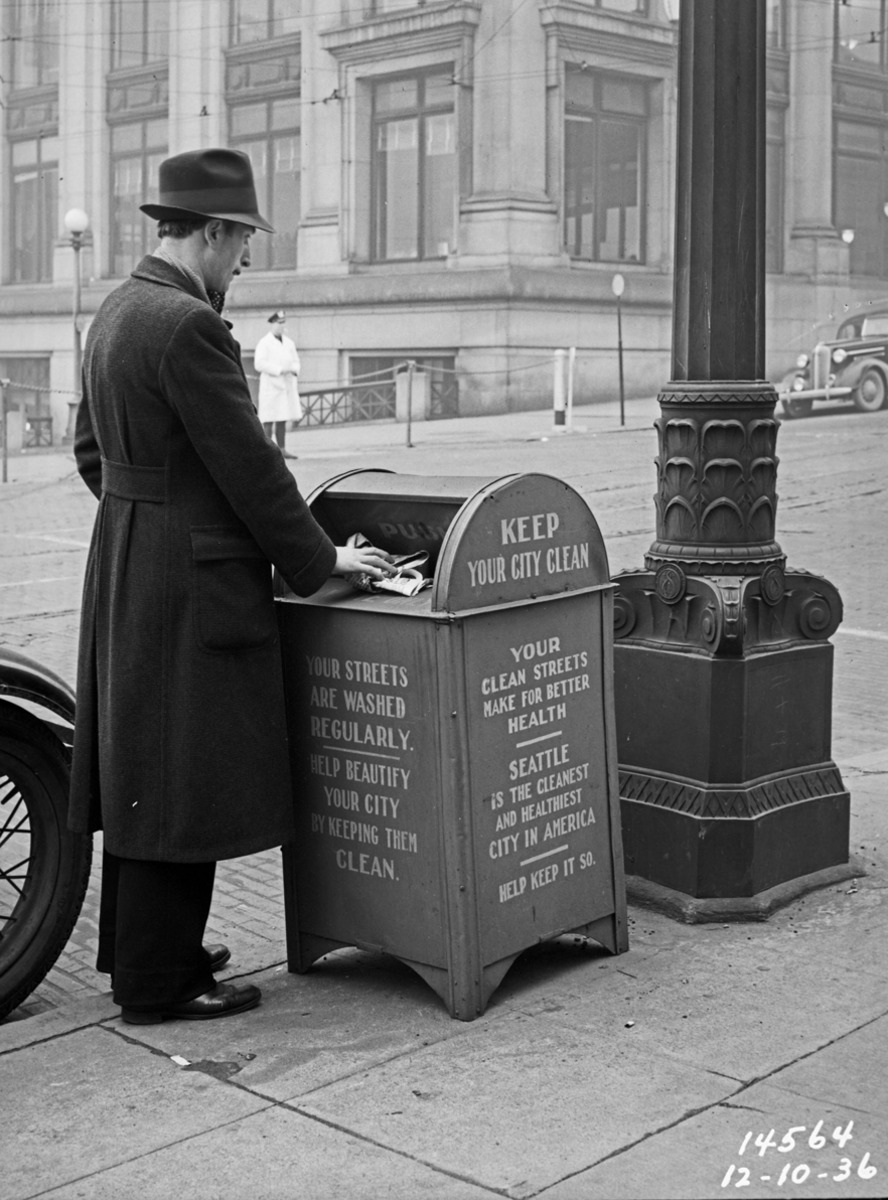
A man throwing the trash in Downtown Seattle, 1936.

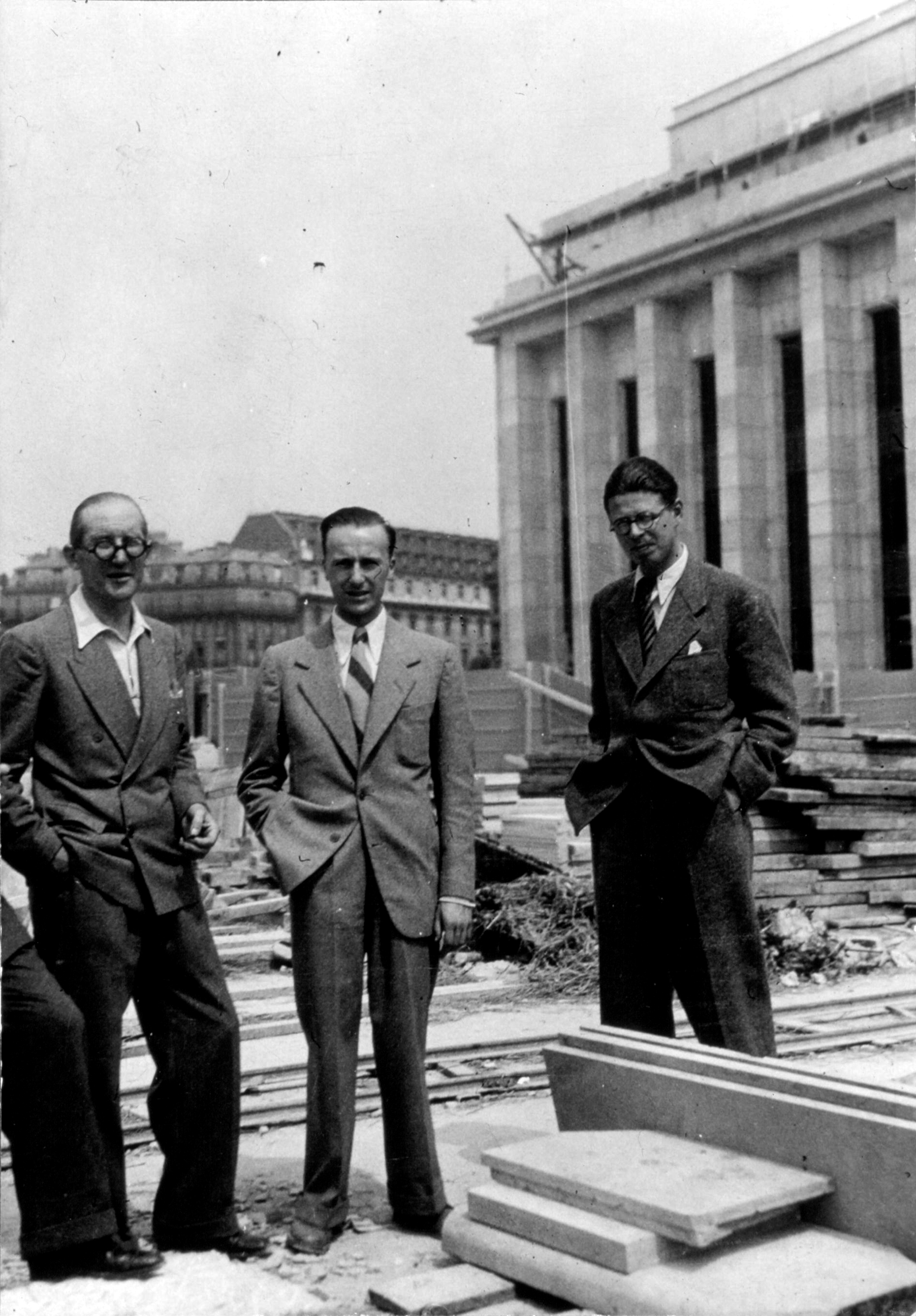
Architects Angelo Bianchetti and Le Corbusier, 1937.

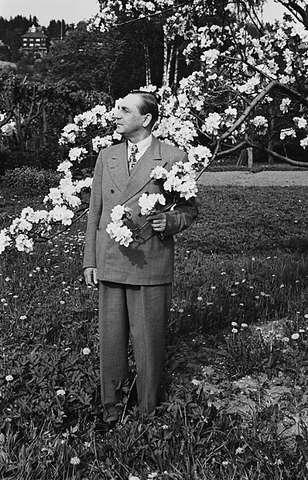
Norwegian politician Kjeld Stub Irgens in his garden, 1939.

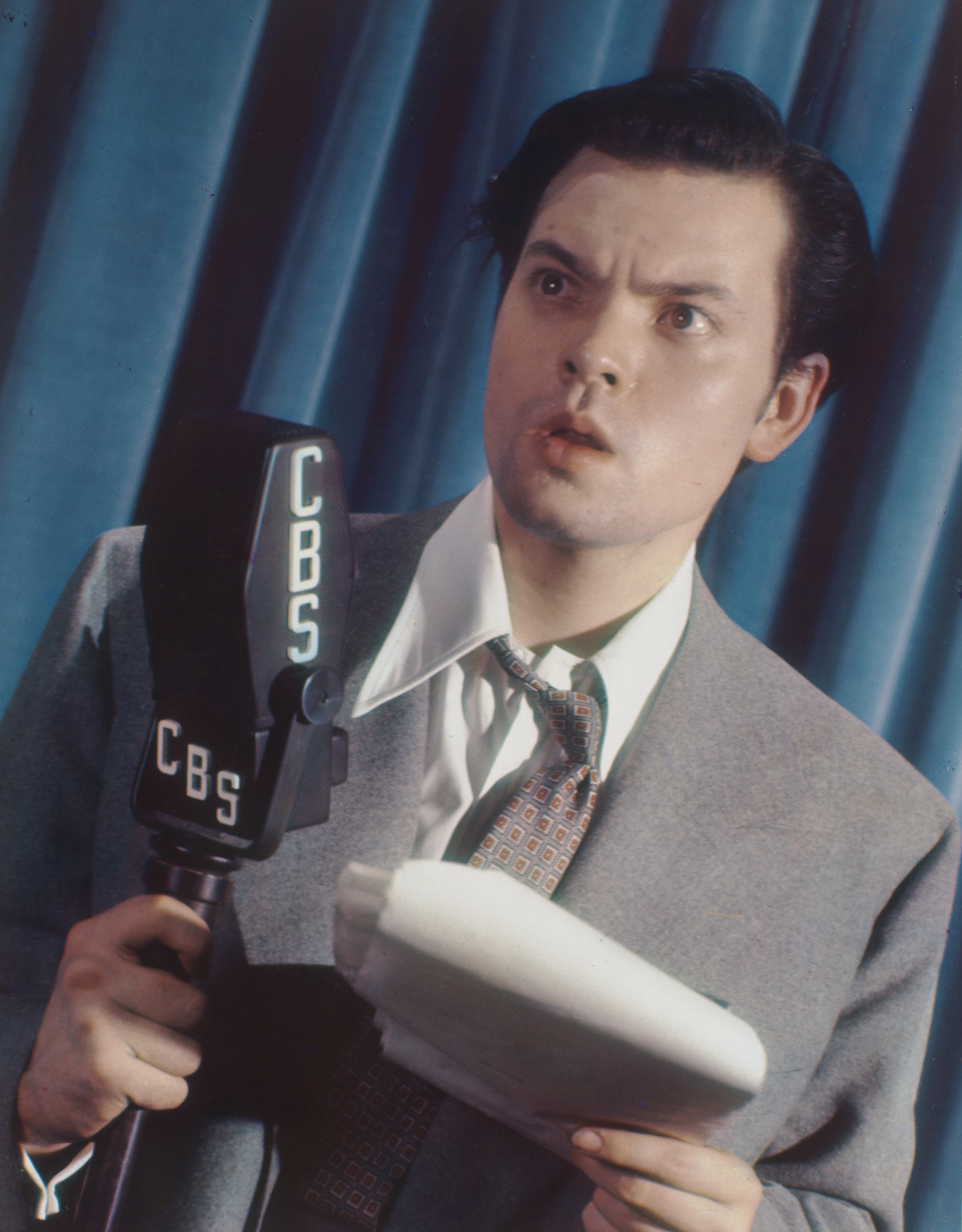
Orson Welles, 1939.

=== Style gallery: Children's fashion ===
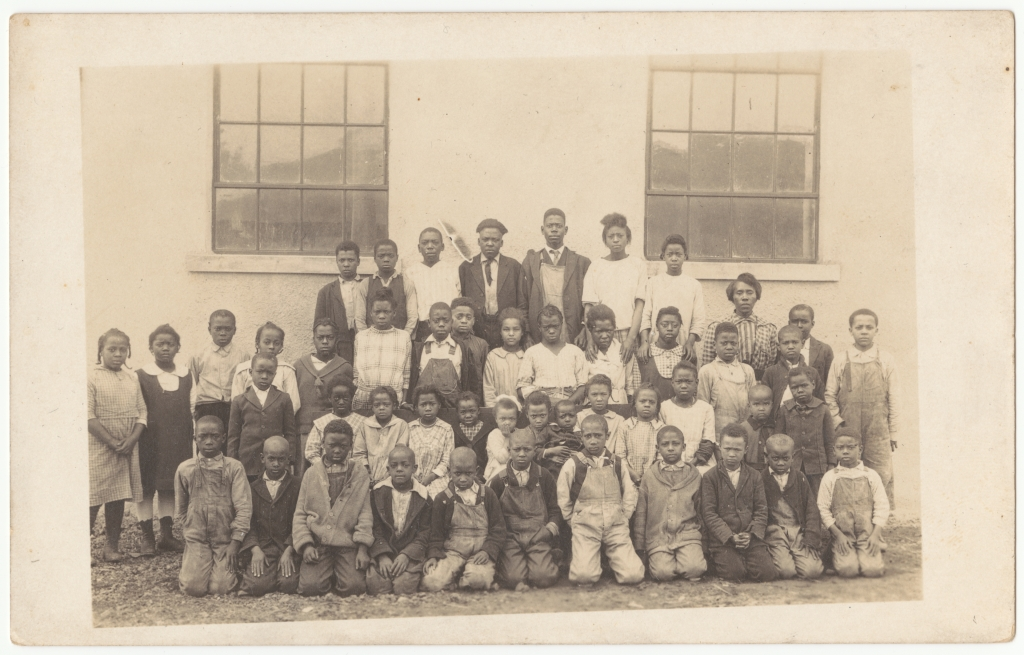
A group of children in the United States, 1930.

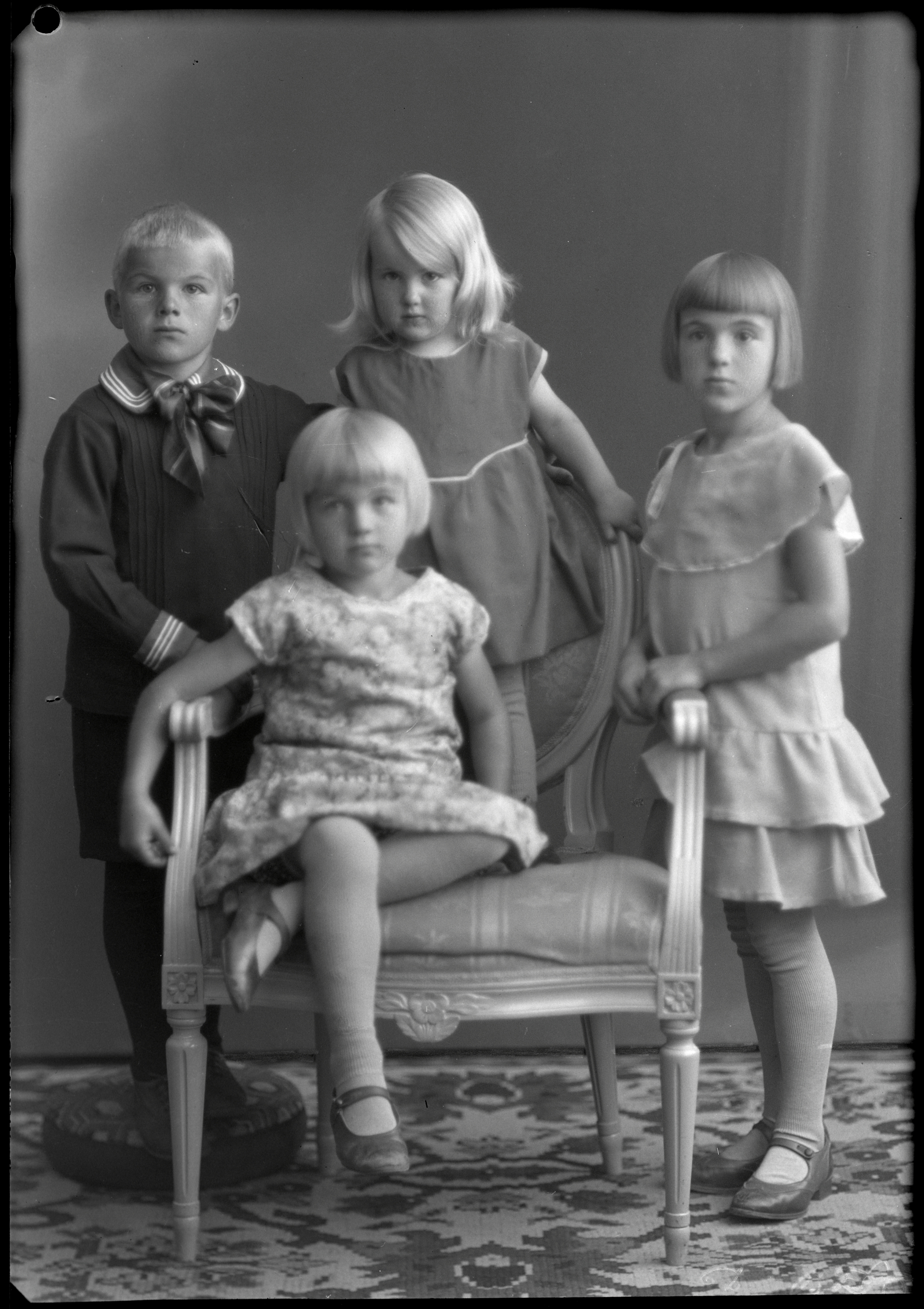
A group of Swedish children, 1930.

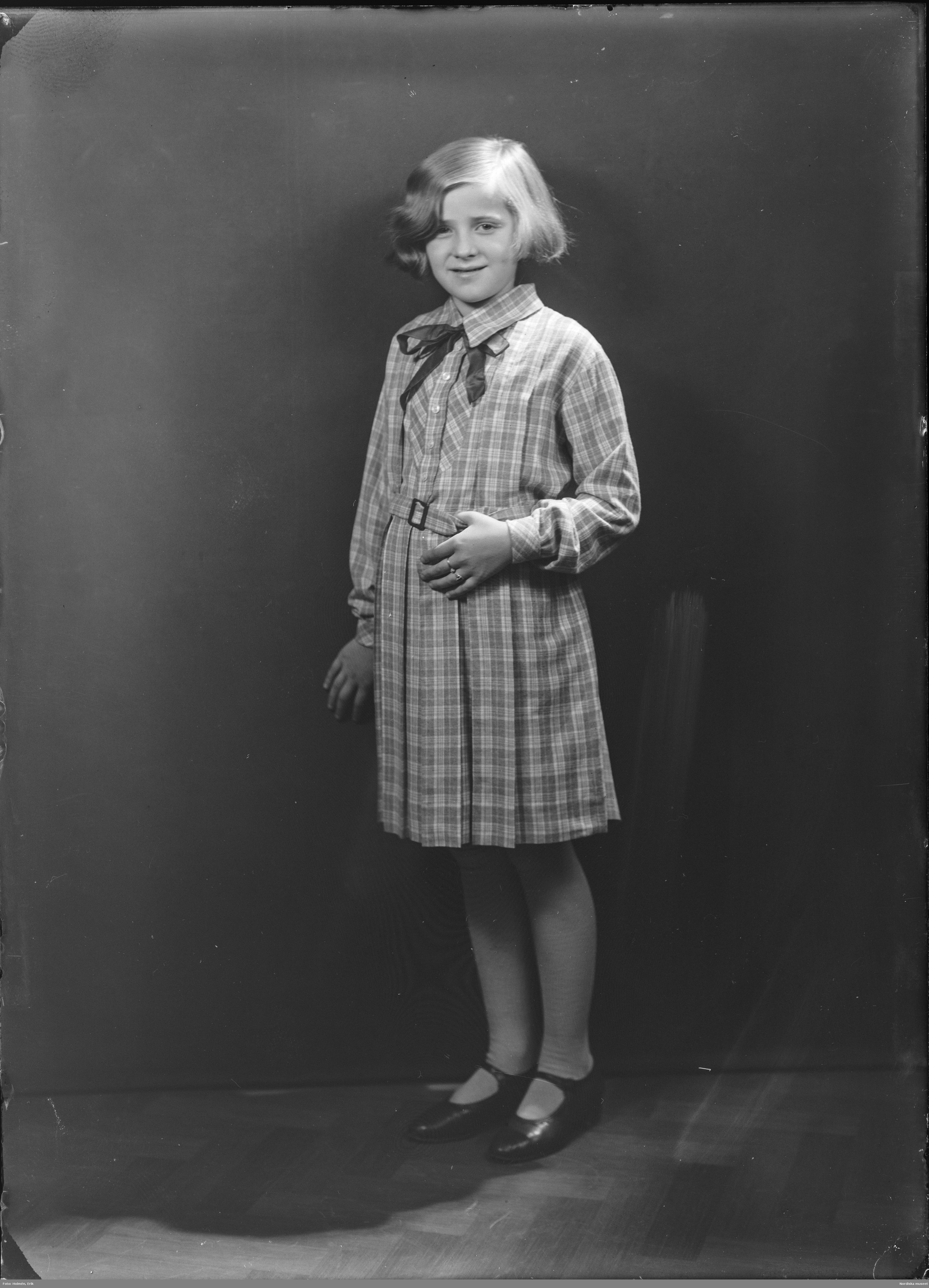
Fashion photograph for a girl's dress. Sweden, 1931.

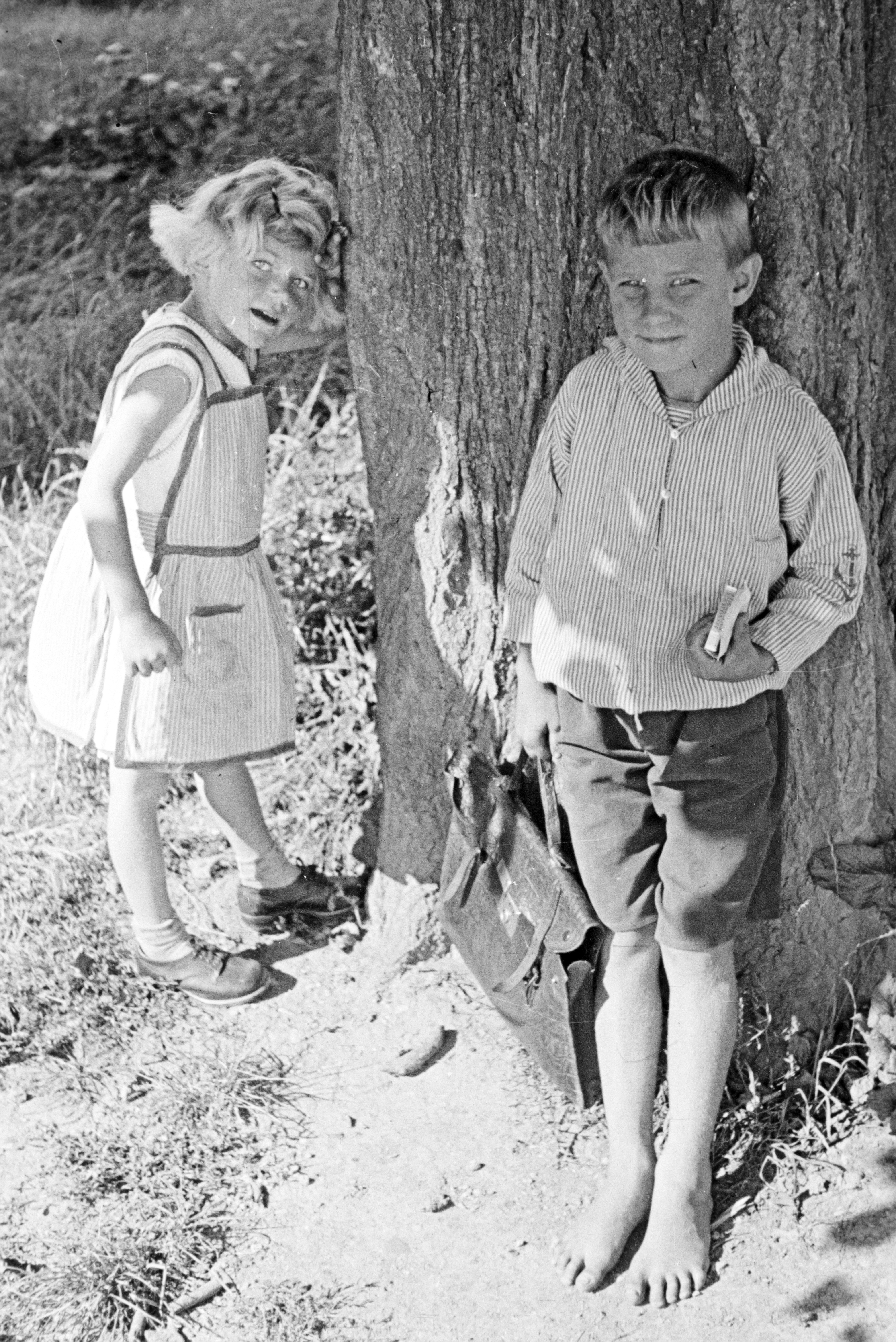
A German boy and girl, c. 1932–1935.

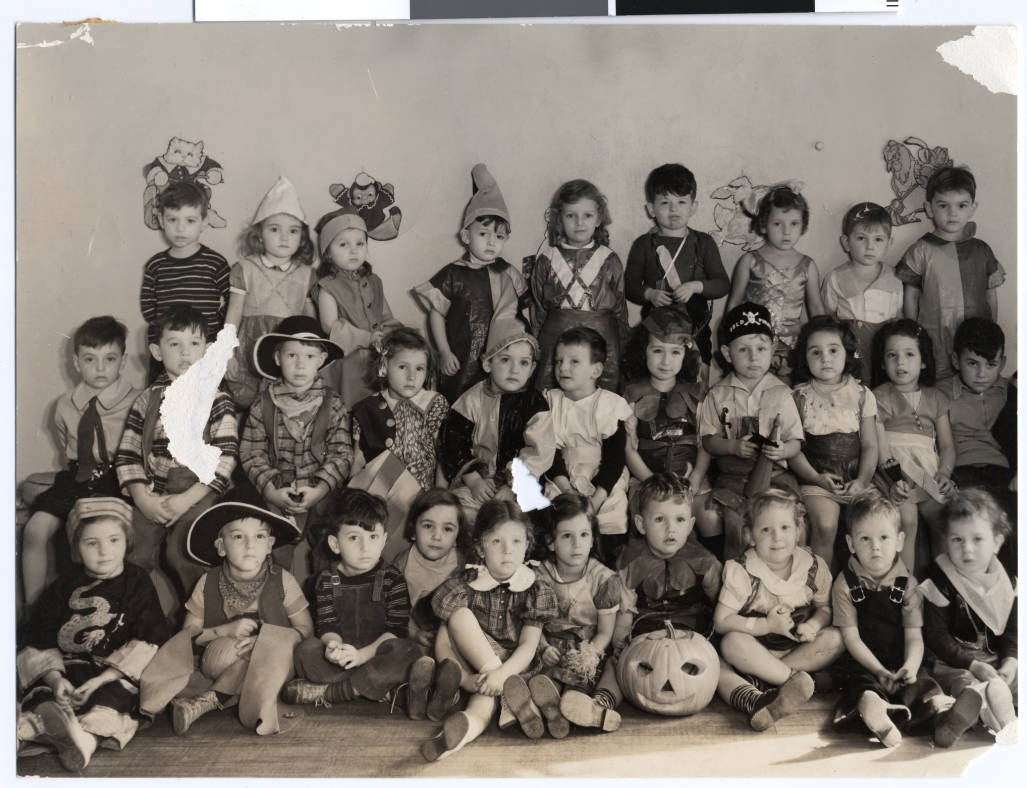
Halloween party for the pre-kindergarten class at the Jewish Educational Center, 1937.

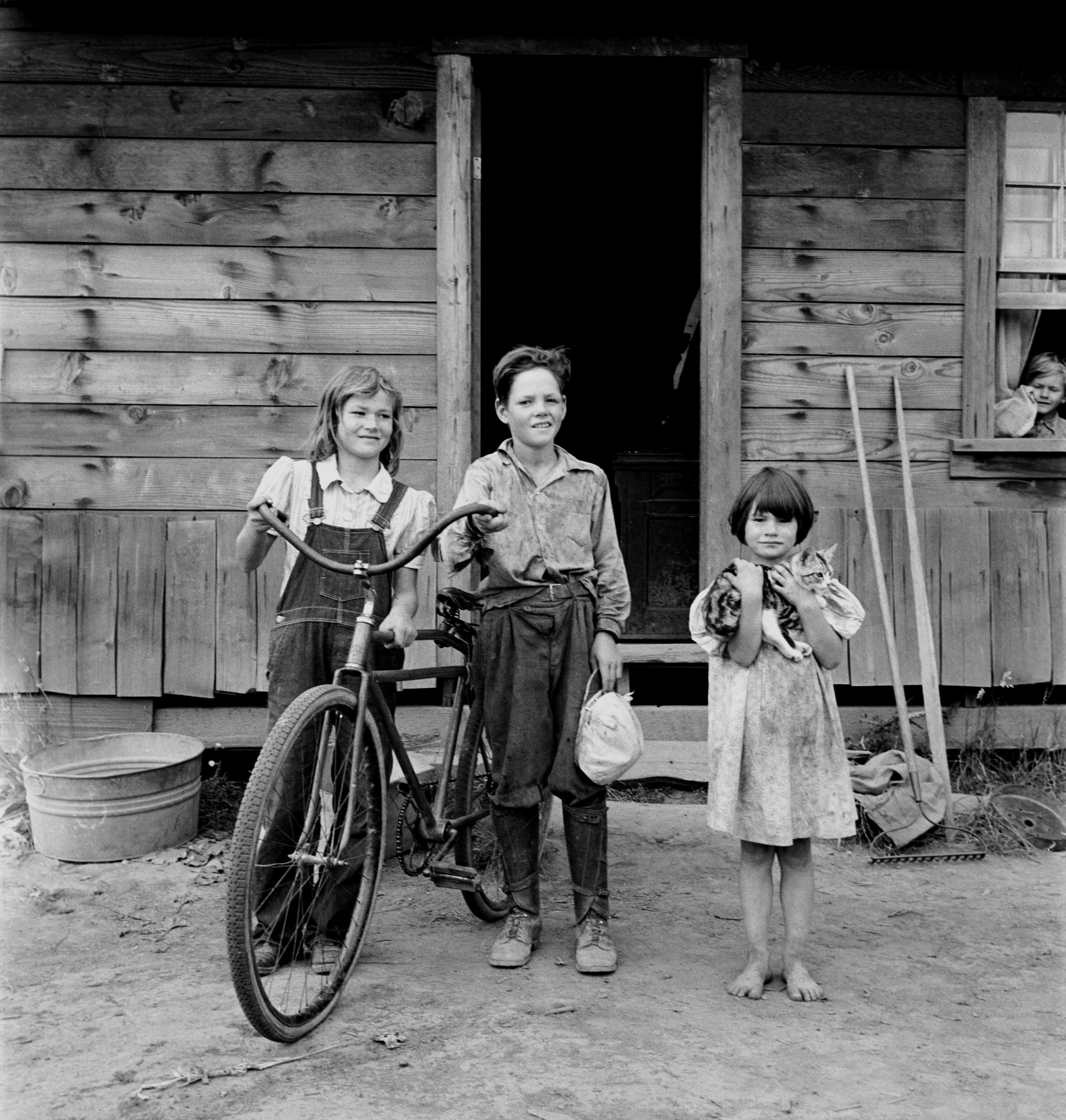
A group of impoverished rural children in Thurston County, photographed in 1939 by Dorothea Lange.

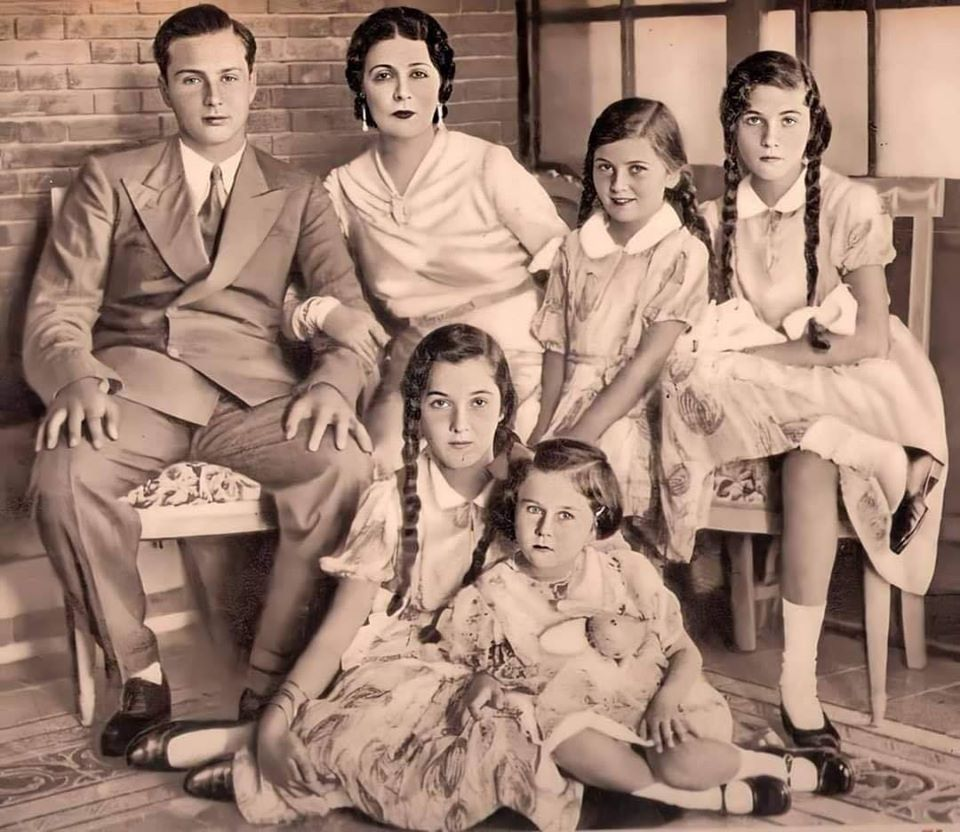
Farouk of Egypt with his mother and sisters, 1938.

=== Style gallery: Fashion illustrations ===
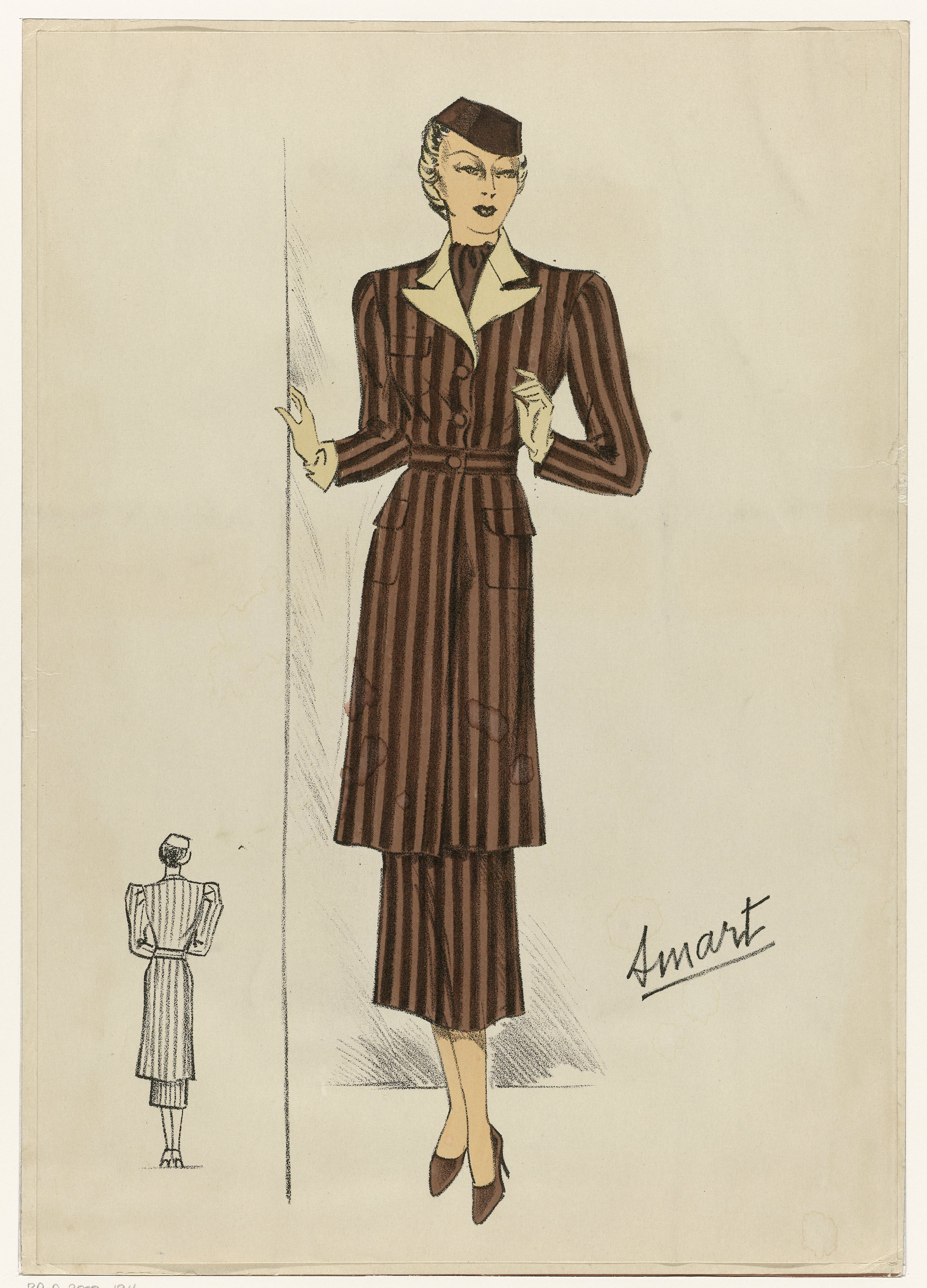
Fashion plate from the Netherlands, c. 1930.

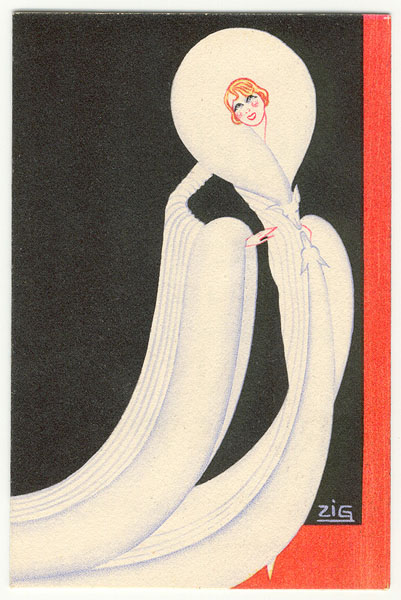
French actress Mistinguett depicted in an advertisement, c. 1930.

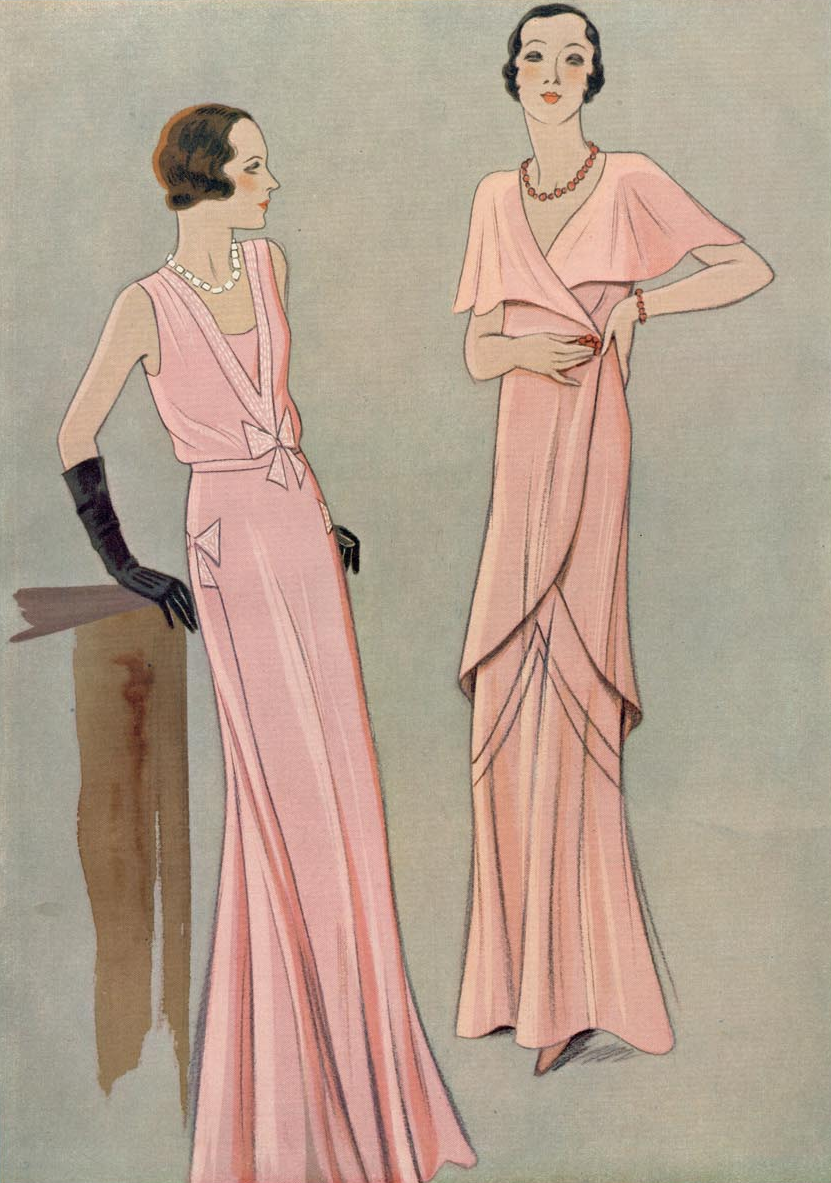
Fashion plate from the Netherlands, May 1931.

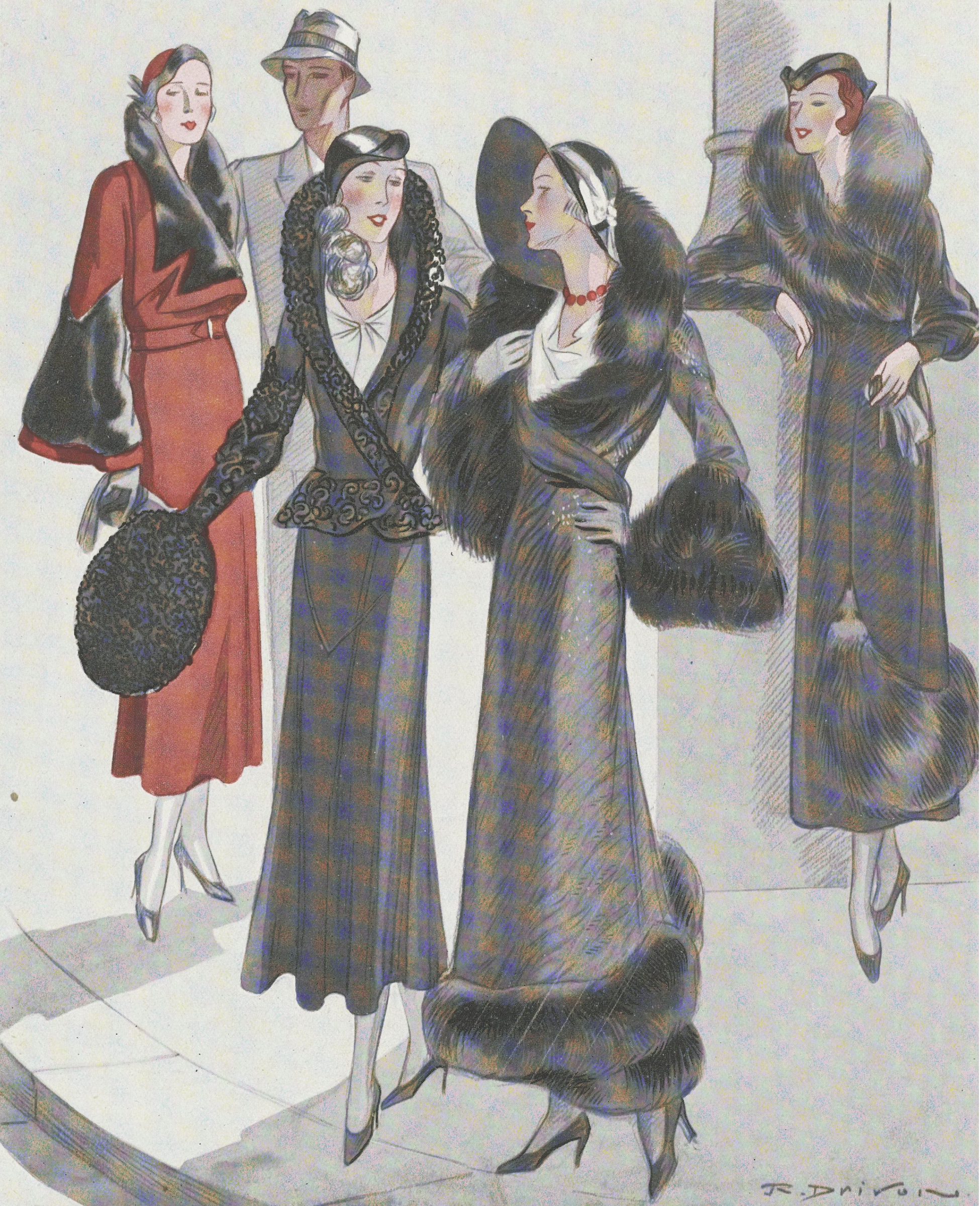
Fashion plate from France, November 1931.

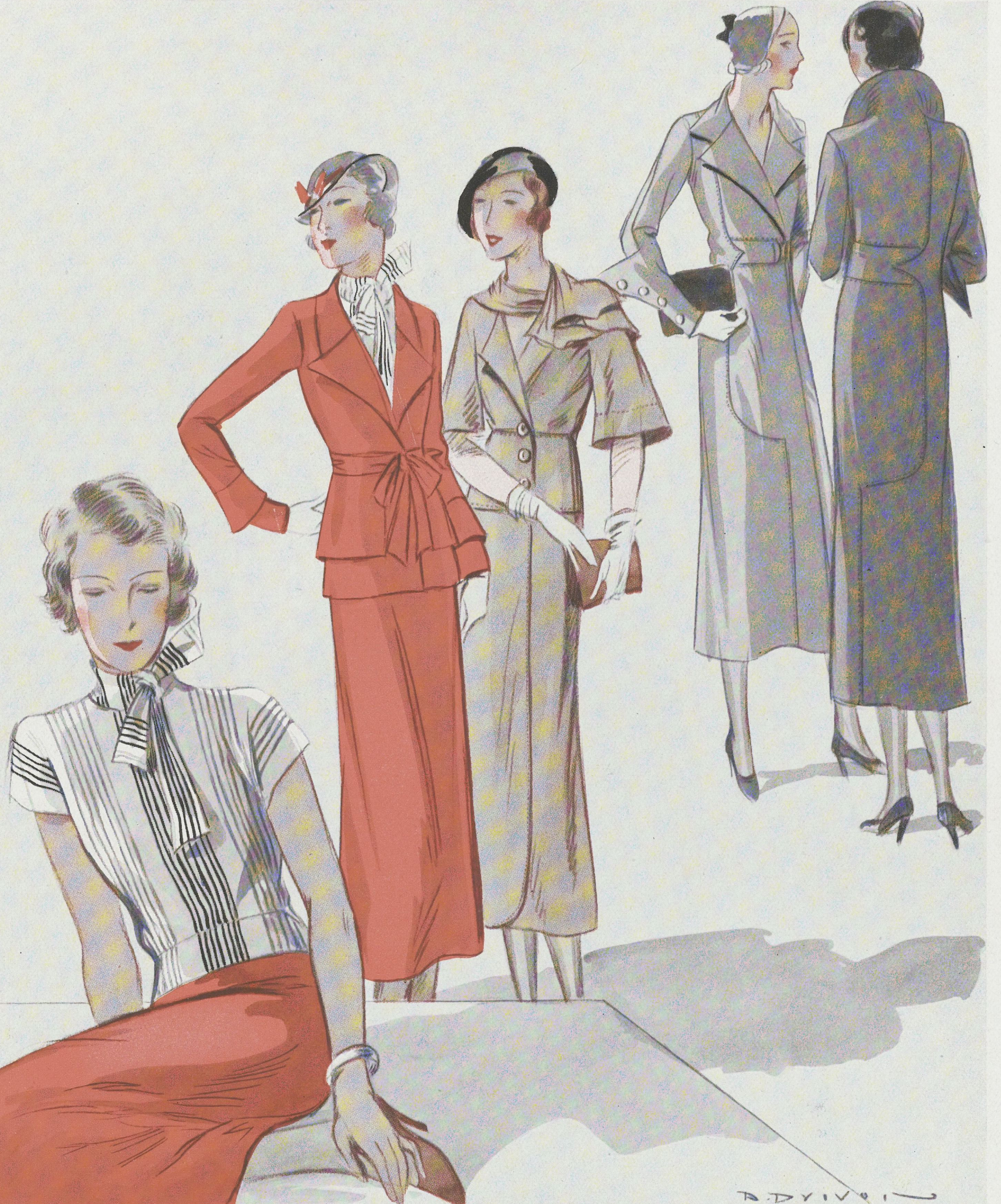
Fashion plate from France, June 1932.

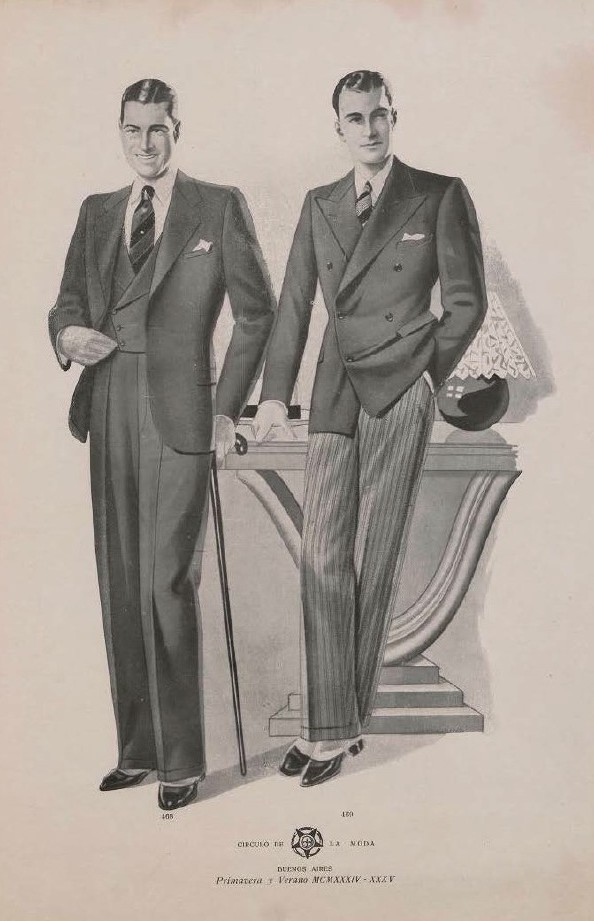
Fashion plate from Argentina, 1934.

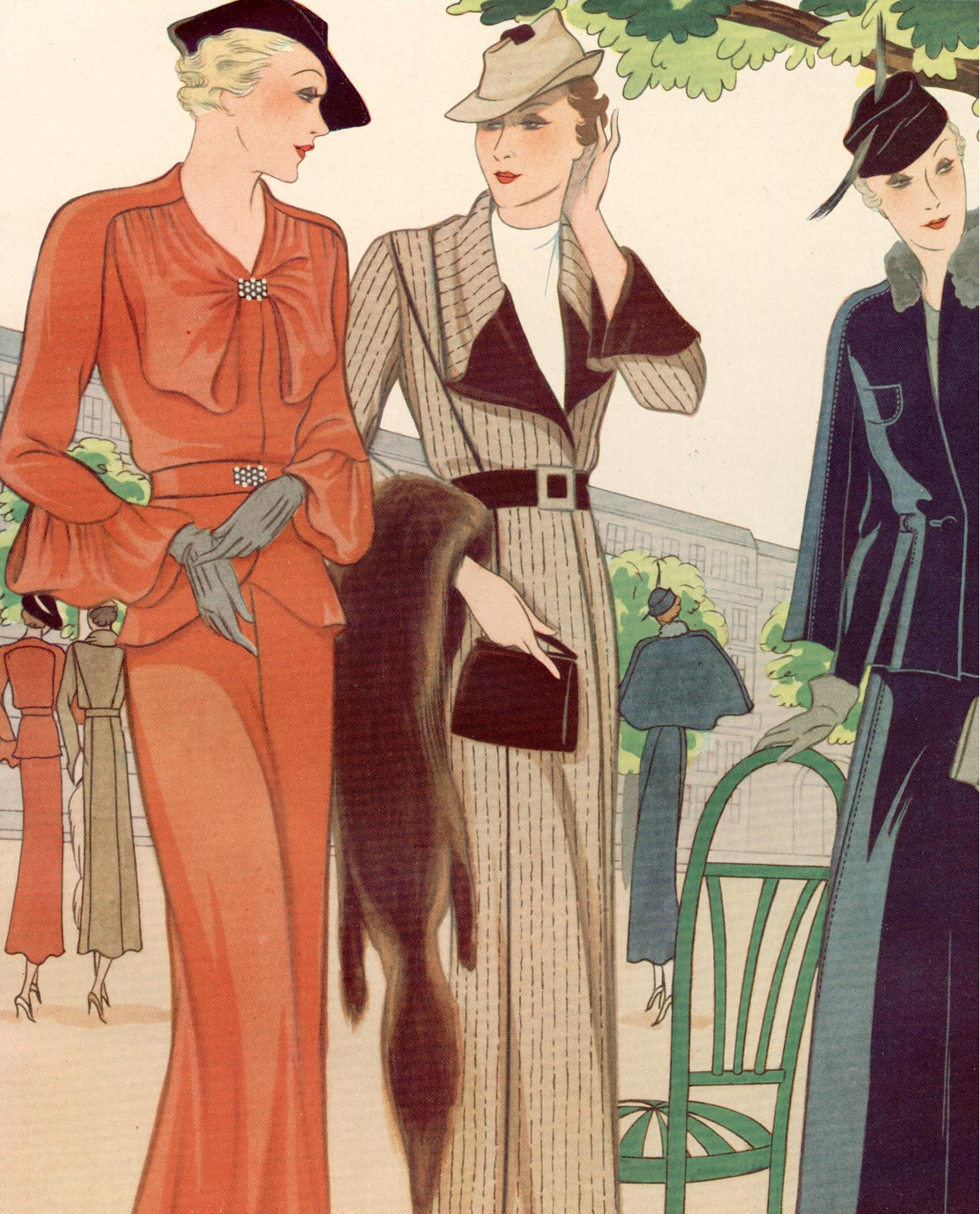
Fashion plate from the Netherlands, March 1935.

== Bibliography ==
- Berry, Sarah (2000). Screen Style: Fashion and Femininity in 1930s Hollywood. University of Minnesota Press. ISBN 9780816633128.
- Blanco F., José, ed. (2016). Clothing and Fashion: American Fashion from Head to Toe. Vol. 3. Bloomsbury Publishing. ISBN 978-161-069-310-3 – via Google Books.
- Cumming, Valerie; Cunnington, C. W.; Cunnington, P. E. (2010). The Dictionary of Fashion History. Berg Publishers. ISBN 9781847885340.
- Cole, Daniel James; Deihl, Nancy (2015). The History of Modern Fashion. Laurence King Publishing. ISBN 9781780676036.
- Fiell, Charlotte, ed. (2021) [2011]. 1930s Fashion Sourcebook: The Definitive Sourcebook (eBook). Preface by Charlotte Fiell. Introduction by Emmanuelle Dirix. Welbeck Publishing. ISBN 9781802791631 – via Google Books.
- Hennessy, Kathryn; Fischel, Anna, eds. (2012). Fashion: The Definitive History of Costume and Style. Smithsonian. DK. ISBN 9780756698355.
- Laver, James (1960). The Concise History of Costume and Fashion. Harry N. Abrams, Inc. ASIN B000WONVOG.
- Tortora, Phyllis G.; Marcketti, Sara B. (2015) [1989]. Survey of Historic Costume (6th ed.). Fairchild Books. ISBN 978-1-62892-167-0.
