= 1920s in Western fashion =

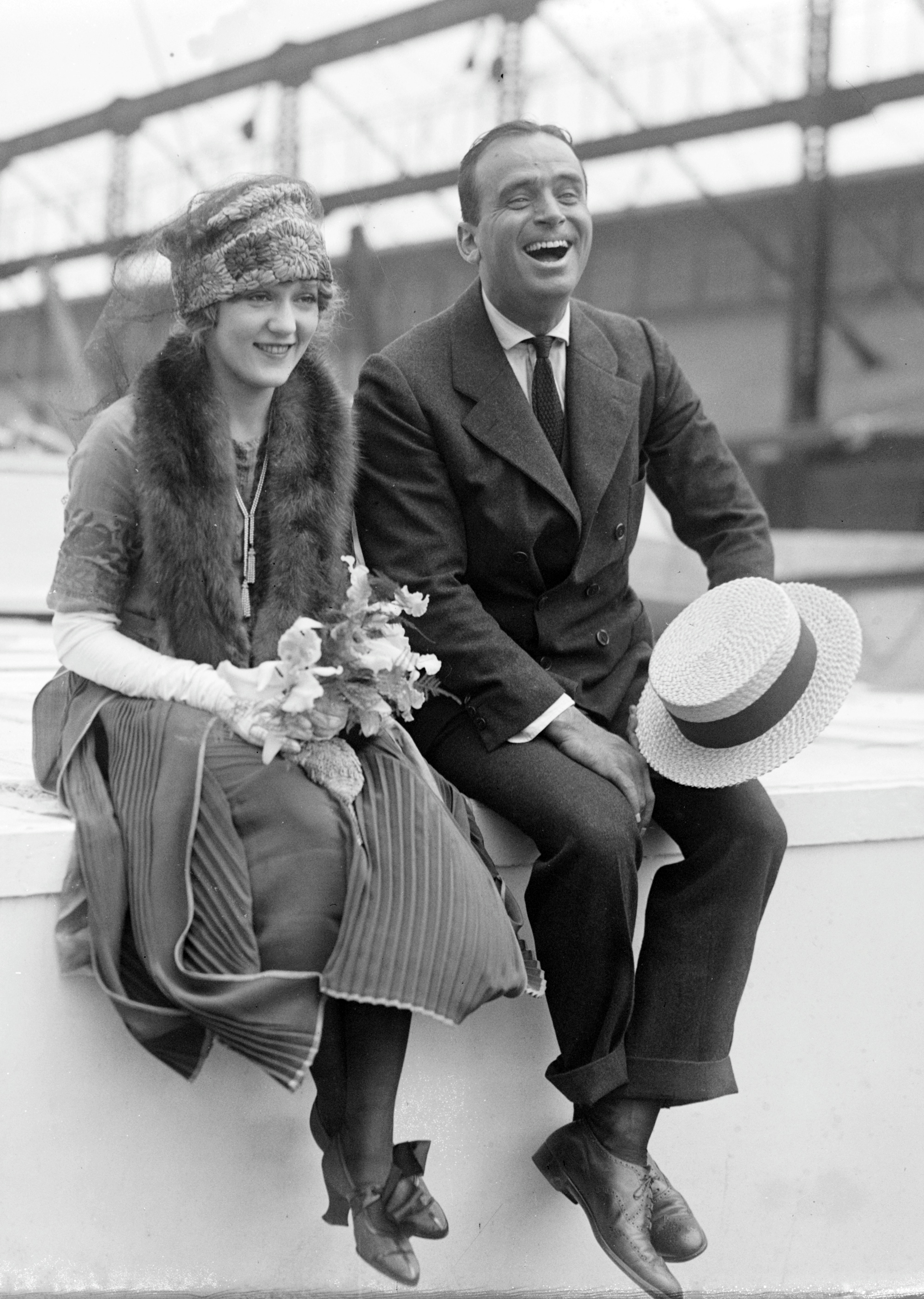
Actors Douglas Fairbanks and Mary Pickford on board the SS Lapland on their honeymoon, 1920

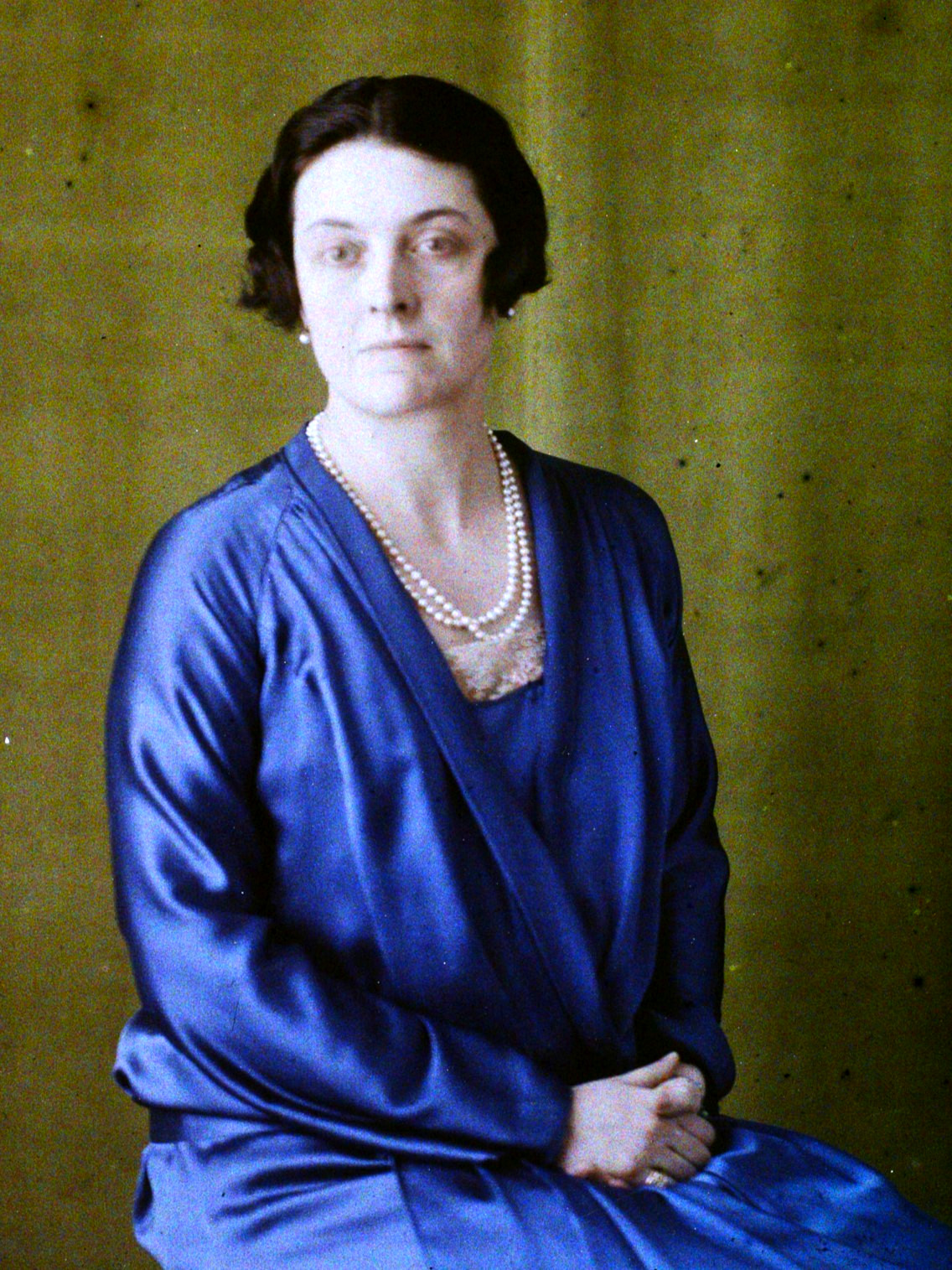
A French aristocrat in Paris wearing a silk dress, Autochrome Lumière process dated 1928

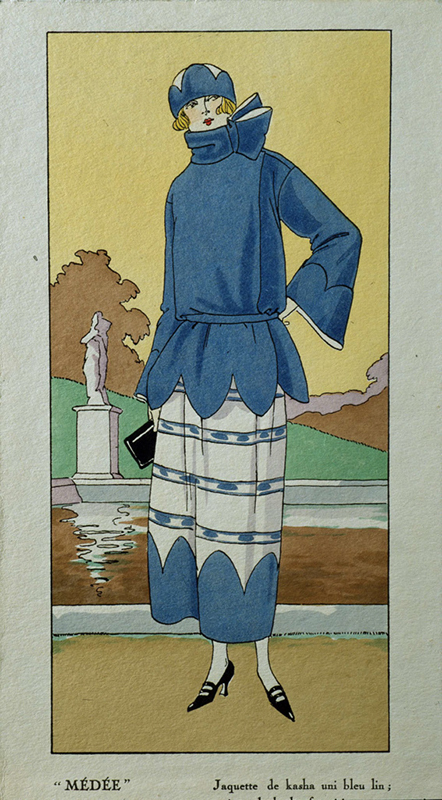
A drawing picturing French women's fashion, c.1921

Typical fashion in California, 1925

Western fashion in the 1920s underwent a modernization. Women's fashion continued to evolve from the restrictions of gender roles and traditional styles of the Victorian era. Women wore looser clothing which revealed more of the arms and legs, that had begun at least a decade prior with the rising of hemlines to the ankle and the movement from the S-bend corset to the columnar silhouette of the 1910s. Men also began to wear less formal daily attire, and athletic clothing, or "sportswear", became a part of mainstream fashion for the first time.

Fashion in the 1920s was largely impacted by women. They challenged the standard of femininity through clothing, as many of their typical dress items were impractical to move around in. For many, fashion had become a symbol of women's social liberation or the modernization of womanhood. However, it had also become a place where slim body structures and restraints of gender roles were implied.

The 1920s are characterized by two distinct periods of fashion: in the early part of the decade, change was slower, and there was more reluctance to wear the new, revealing popular styles. From 1925, the public more passionately embraced the styles now typically associated with the Roaring Twenties. These styles continued to characterize fashion until the worldwide depression worsened in the 1930s.

== Overview ==
After World War I, the United States entered a prosperous era and, as a result of its role in the war, came out of isolation onto the world stage. Social customs and morals were relaxed in the optimism brought on by the end of the war and the booming of the stock market. Women were entering the workforce in record numbers. In the United States in 1920, there was the enactment of the 18th Amendment, or as many know it, Prohibition. Prohibition stated that it would be illegal to sell and consume alcohol. This lasted until 1933, so it was a constant for the whole 1920s era. This "noble experiment" was intended to reduce crime and corruption, solve social problems, reduce the tax burden created by prisons and poorhouses, and improve health and hygiene. The nationwide prohibition on alcohol was ignored by many resulting in speakeasies. Another important amendment in the United States was the 19th Amendment, which gave women the right to vote. There was a revolution in almost every sphere of human activity. Fashion was no exception; women entered the workforce and earned the right to vote, and they felt liberated. Fashion trends became more accessible, masculine, and practical, creating the emergence of "The New Woman". Flappers was a popular name given to women of this time because of what they wore. While corsets gradually started to become less relevant for the emerging silhouette, shapewear was very widely used. To better allow for more general mobility amongst working women, undergarments with little to no boning, often referred to as corselets, become quite popular. In many ways, it is considered the predecessor of the girdle.

The development of new fabrics and new means of fastening clothing affected fashions of the 1920s. Natural fabrics such as cotton and wool were the abundant fabrics of the decade. Silk was highly desired for its luxurious qualities, but the limited supply made it expensive. In the late 19th century, "artificial silk" was first made in France, from a solution of cellulose. After being patented in the United States, the first American plant began production of this new fabric, in 1910. This fiber became known as rayon. Rayon stockings became popular in the decade as a substitute for silk stockings. Rayon was also used in some undergarments. Many garments before the 1920s were fastened with buttons and lacing, but the development of metal hooks and eyes during the decade meant that fastening clothing became easier. Hooks and eyes, buttons, zippers, and snaps were all used to fasten clothing.

Vastly improved production methods enabled manufacturers to easily produce clothing affordable by working families. The average person's fashion sense became more sophisticated. Meanwhile, working-class women looked for modern forms of dress as they transitioned from rural to urban careers. Taking their cue from wealthier women, working women began wearing less expensive variations on the day suit, adopting a more modern look that seemed to suit their new, technologically focused careers as typists and telephone operators.

Although simple lines and minimal adornment reigned on the runways, the 1920s were not free of luxury. Expensive fabrics, including silk, velvet, and satin were favored by high-end designers, while department stores carried less expensive variations on those designs made of newly available synthetic fabrics. The use of mannequins became widespread during the 1920s and served as a way to show shoppers how to combine and accessorize the new fashions. The modern fashion cycle, established in the 1920s, still dominates the industry today. Designers favored separates in new fabrics like jersey that could be mixed and matched for work and modern, informal, un-chaperoned social activities like attending films or the theater and car rides.

== Women's wear ==
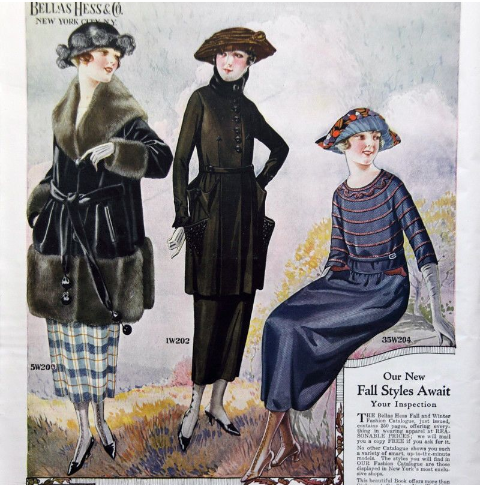
Bellas Hess and Company advertise detail, 1920

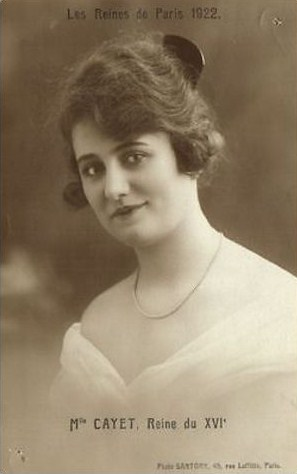
In the early 1920s, some women chose not to bob their hair, so they pinned it up to look shorter. Mlle Cayet, Queen of Parisian Carnival, 1922

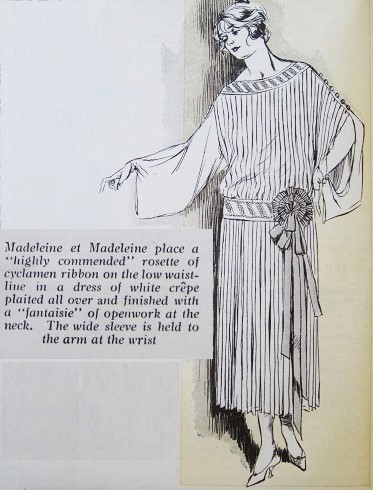
Between 1922 and 1923, the waistline boot dropped to the hips. The 1920s classic tubular fashion was born. Parisian fashion house Madeleine-et-Madeleine design, January, 1922.

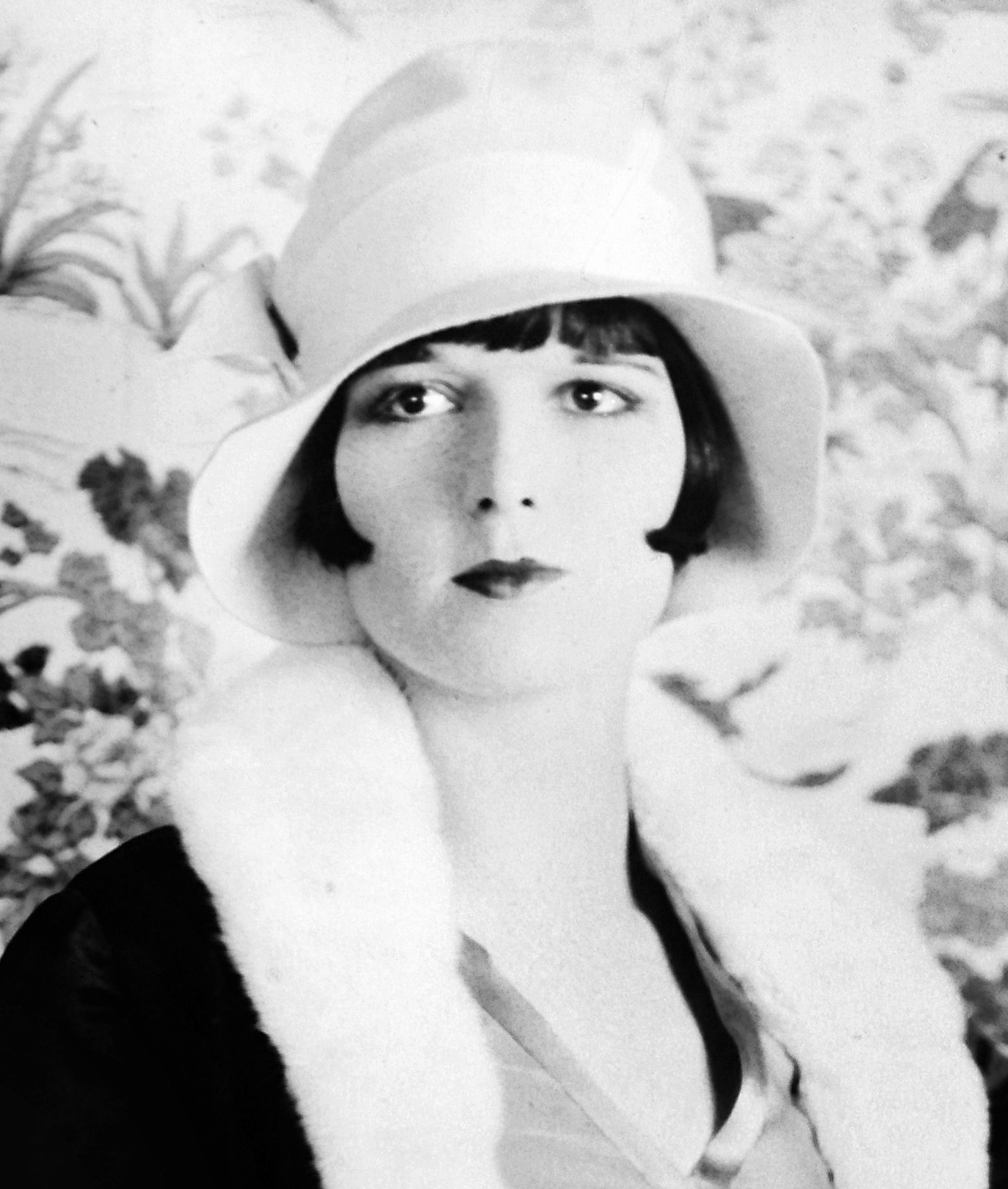
Actress Louise Brooks in 1926, wearing bobbed hair under a cloche hat

Paris set the fashion trends for Europe and North America. The fashion for women was all about letting loose. Women wore dresses all day, every day. Day dresses had a drop waist, which was a belt around the low waist or hip and a skirt that hung anywhere from the ankle on up to the knee, never above. Daywear had sleeves (long to mid-bicep) and a skirt that was straight, pleated, hank hem, or tiered. Hair was often bobbed, giving a boyish look.

Clothing fashions changed with women's changing roles in society, particularly with the idea of new fashion. Although society matrons of a certain age continued to wear conservative dresses, the sportswear worn by forward-looking and younger women became the greatest change in post-war fashion. The tubular dresses of the 'teens had evolved into a similar silhouette that now sported shorter skirts with pleats, gathers, or slits to allow motion. The most memorable fashion trend of the Roaring Twenties was undoubtedly "the flapper" look. The flapper dress was functional and flattened the bust line rather than accentuating it.

The straight-line chemise topped by the close-fitting cloche hat became the uniform of the day. Women "bobbed", or cut, their hair short to fit under the popular hats, a radical move in the beginning, but standard by the end of the decade. Particularly in France, the epicenter of art and fashion, the bobbed hairstyle came to be associated with controversy with constant stories and rumors of family members rejecting the women of their family because of their decision to get a bobbed cut. In the west, women won the right to vote in the late nineteenth to the early twentieth centuries; that may have played a role in the social reboot that was to come in the 1920s.

The pioneer of this hairstyle is often disputed; the primary figures frequently mentioned are the French fashion designer Coco Chanel who shortened her hair some time in 1916, Joan of Arc who was a powerful female symbol of strength in France and the novel La garconne by Victor Marguerite - the plot of a woman who lives a liberated lifestyle. Low-waisted dresses with fullness at the hemline allowed women to literally kick up their heels in new dances like the Charleston. In 1925, "shift" type dresses with no waistline emerged. At the end of the decade, dresses were being worn with straight bodices and collars. Tucks at the bottom of the bodices were popular, as well as knife-pleated skirts with a hem approximately one inch below the knee.

In the world of art, fashion was being influenced heavily by art movements such as surrealism. Elsa Schiaparelli is one key Italian designer of this decade who was heavily influenced by the "beyond the real" art and incorporated it into her designs.

Proper attire for women was enforced for morning, afternoon, and evening activities. In the early part of the decade, wealthy women were still expected to change from a morning to an afternoon dress. These afternoon or "tea gowns" were less form-fitting than evening dresses, featured long, flowing sleeves, and were adorned with sashes, bows, or artificial flowers at the waist. For evening wear the term "cocktail dress" was invented in France for American clientele. With the "New Woman" also came the "Drinking Woman". The cocktail dress was styled with a matching hat, gloves, and shoes. What was so unique about the cocktail dress was that it could be worn not just at cocktail hours (6 and 8pm), but by manipulating and styling the accessories correctly could be worn appropriately for any event from 3 pm to the late evening. Evening dresses were typically slightly longer than tea gowns, in satin or velvet, and embellished with beads, rhinestones, or fringe.

=== Blouses and skirts ===
Both blouses and separate skirts went out of fashion by mid-decade, and were popular during the early years of the decade.

During 1920, the lengths of the skirt went to the ankle with a slight bow around the hips and tapering slightly to the hemline.

In 1922, skirts went off from the ankle and reached mid-shin. And created a slightly A-lined shape by flaring out, or in a barrel-like shape by tapering around the hips. Blouses were worn often tucked in the skirt's waistbands and were pulled out a few inches.

Waistbands wide and patch pockets large, and the skirts were fastened with hooks on the sides. The buttons that were on the outside were often for decorative purposes and were non-functional.

=== Jewelry ===
In the 20s, the jewelry was not determined by the cost of materials, instead, the focus was more on the design. In the 20s, precious gemstones were largely began to be replaced with both semi-precious stones and plastics as the visual appeal of jewelry shifted from the stones themselves to the designs of the pieces, as seen through the rise of jewelry taking more Art Deco-esque designs. Notable necklaces of the time were long pearl or beaded necklaces, Dog collar necklaces (similar to a choker, but worn lower), drop earrings, and large bracelets (typically made of thick or thin wood, bone, shell, metal, or plastic - sometimes with gems, often mimicking African tribal art).

=== Headbands ===
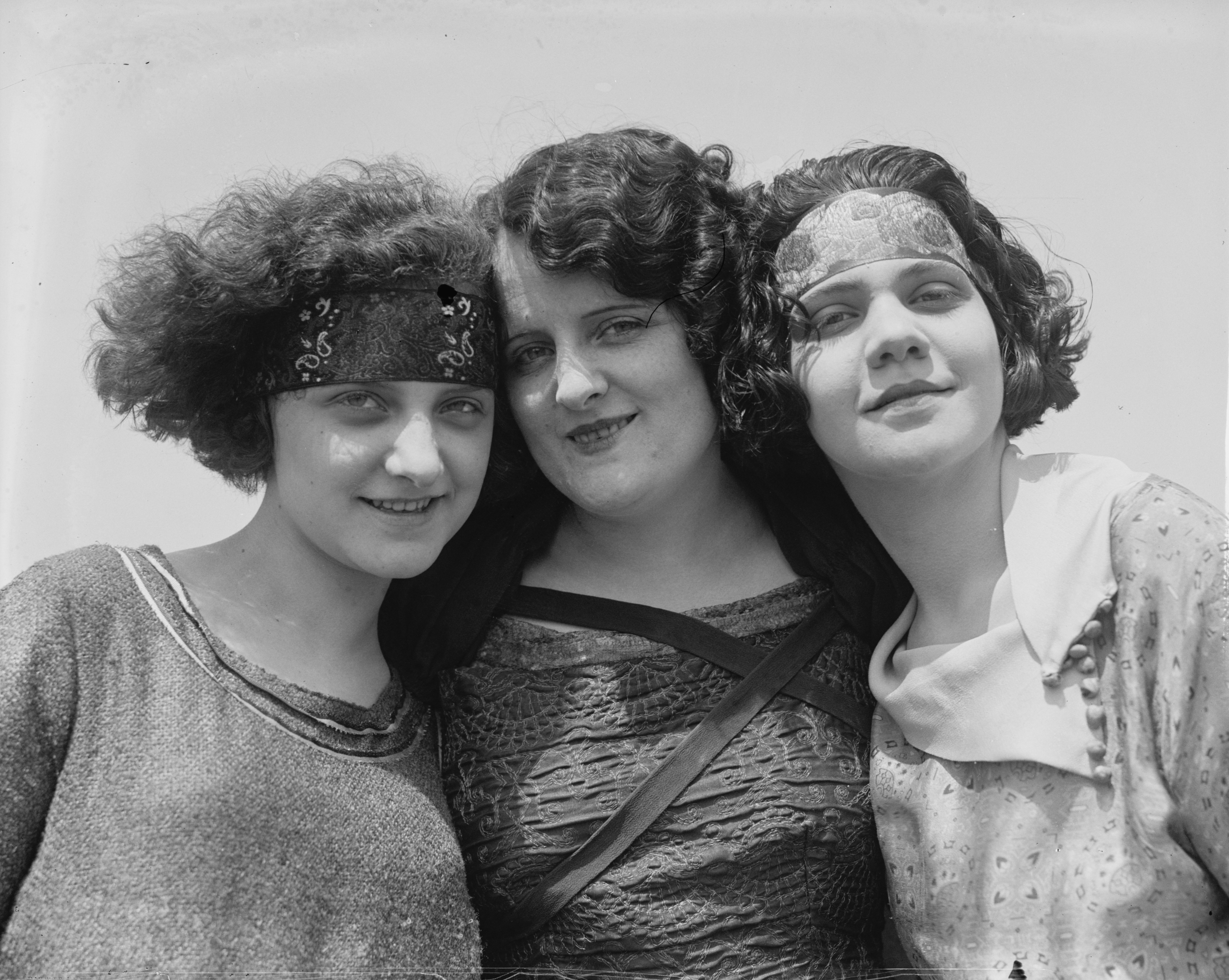
Young women with headbands 1923.

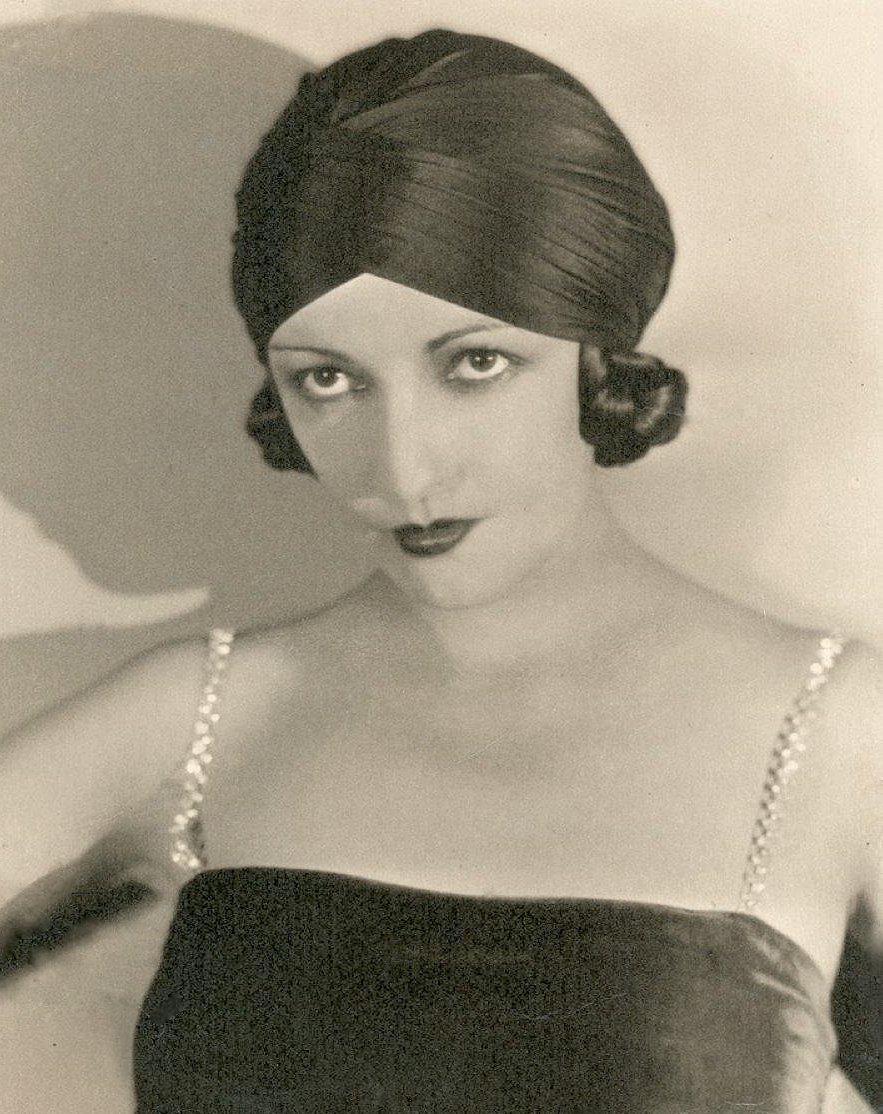
Natacha Rambova with an evening wear headwrap 1925.

Headbands were known as bandeaus. They were worn in the evenings with the most formal dresses, until 1925. Style of these kind of accessories include

- Brain Binder
- Feather Headband
- Haircomb
- Headwrap
- Skullcap
- Tiara
- Wrap style

=== Accessories ===
One of the key accessories in the 20s was the Cloche hat. "In 1926 Vogue stated 'The Bob Rules', just 9 years after the influential dancer, Irene Castle, cut her hair. This trending topic inspired a 1920 short story by F. Scott Fitzgerald, called Bernice Bobs Her Hair, and many editorials in Vogue throughout the decade." The bob hairstyle matched perfectly with the loose and straight silhouette of the times. During this era Vogue gave credit to this new cut for the immense success of the hat business. New haircuts meant new styled hats, therefore there was a new craze for hats. The cloche hat and the bob were basically made for each other.

Jewelry was less conspicuous. Jewelry was much less elaborate, and began using 'romantic', more natural shapes. The Art Nouveau movement of 1890-1910 inspired most of the natural forms and geometric shapes of the jewelry during the 1920s. "Aesthetic clean lines were inspired by designs found in industrial machines. A key influence of this modernism was the influential Bauhaus movement, with its philosophy of form following function. Contrasting textures and colour were also in fashion. Examples of changing tastes in design were the use of diamonds being set against onyx or trans lucid vitrines and amethysts juxtaposed against opaque coral and jade." Even though geometric shapes and cleaner shaped jewelry were now a trend, one of the key pieces was the long rope pearl necklace. The long rope pearl necklace was a signature faux piece that was sold everywhere at the time. It was inexpensive and basic in a woman's wardrobe. "Although buffeted by cycles of boom, depression and war, jewelry design between the 1920s and 1950s continued to be both innovative and glamorous. Sharp, geometric patterns celebrated the machine age, while exotic creations inspired by the Near and Far East hinted that jewelry fashions were truly international."

Shoes were finally visible during the 1920s. Before, long garments covered up shoes, so they weren't an important part of women's fashion. Now, shoes were seen by everyone and played an important part during the 1920s. Women had all kinds of shoes for all kinds of events. Everything from house shoes, walking shoes, dancing shoes, sporting shoes, to swimming shoes. The shoe industry became an important industry that transformed the way we buy shoes today. Shoes were made in standard sizes perfect to order from fashion catalogs to the near boutique. In the beginning of the 1920s, Mary Janes were still popular from previous era, although they paved the way for the invention of many other shoes. The T-strap heel was a variation of the Mary Jane, having the same base with the addition of a strap going around the heel and down to the top of the shoe that looked like a T. Also, "The bar shoe which fastened with a strap and a single button became popular during the 1920s. It was worn with the new short skirts and was practical for their vigorous style of dancing."

=== The influence of jazz ===
"The Jazz Age", a term popularized by F. Scott Fitzgerald, was a phrase used to represent the mass popularity of jazz music during the 1920s. Both jazz music and dance marked the transition from the archaic societal values of the Victorian era to the arrival of a new youthful modernistic society. Jazz gained much of its popularity due to its perceived exoticism, from its Afro-American roots to its melodic and soulful rhythm. The music itself had quite an alluring effect on the new youthful society and was considered to be the pulse of the 1920s due to its spontaneity. With new music emerged new dancing. Jazz dances, such as the Charleston, replaced the slow waltz. Paul Whitman popularized jazz dance. In fact, jazz music and dance are responsible for the origin of the iconic term "flapper", a group of new socially unconventional ladies. When dancers did the Charleston, the fast movement of the feet and swaying of the arms resembled the flapping movements of a bird. Jazz music sparked the need to dance, and dance sparked the need for new clothing, especially for women to easily dance without being constricted.

Dances such as the Charleston and the Black Bottom in particular created a need for a revival in women's evening wear due to the dynamic and lively manner of these jazz dances. Dress and skirt hems became shorter in order to allow the body to move more easily. In addition, decorative embellishments on dresses such as fringe threads swung and jingled in sync with the movement of the body. Lastly, the use of glossy and ornate textiles mirrored light to the tempo of jazz music and dance. Jazz music and its perceived exotic nature had both a flamboyant influence on fashion while keeping both form and function in mind.

Jazz and its influence on fashion reached even further, with both jazz and dance motifs making their way onto textiles. These new textile designs included uneven repetitions and linear geometric patterns. Many textile patterns produced in the United States also incorporated images of both jazz bands and people dancing to jazz. The print Rhapsody shows a textile produced in 1925 representing a jazz band in a polka-dot like manner. Not only did textiles take motifs of people dancing and playing jazz music, they included designs that were based on the overall rhythmic feel and sound of jazz music and dance.

=== The boyish figure ===
Undergarments began to transform after World War I to conform to the ideals of a flatter chest and more boyish figure. Corsets were declining in popularity, and the newly popular boyish look was typically achieved through the use of girdles and bust bodices. Some of the new pieces included thin camisoles and cami-knickers, later shortened to panties or knickers. These were primarily made from rayon and came in soft, light colors in order to be worn under semi-transparent fabrics. Young flappers took to these styles of underwear due to the ability to move more freely and the increased comfort when dancing to the high tempo jazz music. During the mid-1920s, all-in-one lingerie became popular.

For the first time in centuries, women's legs were seen with hemlines rising to the knee and dresses becoming more fitted. A more masculine look became popular, including flattened breasts and hips, short hairstyles such as the bob cut, Eton crop, and the Marcel wave. The fashion was seen as expressing a bohemian and progressive outlook.

One of the first women to wear trousers, cut her hair short, and reject the corset was Coco Chanel. Probably the most influential woman in fashion of the 20th century, Chanel did much to further the emancipation and freedom of women's fashion.

Jean Patou, a new French designer, began making two-piece sweater and skirt outfits in luxurious wool jersey and was successful with his morning dresses and sports suits. American women thought his clothes worked for their increasingly active lifestyles.

At the end of the 1920s, Elsa Schiaparelli combined the idea of classic design from the Greeks and Romans with the modern imperative for freedom of movement. Schiaparelli wrote that the ancient Greeks "gave to their goddesses... the serenity of perfection and the fabulous appearance of freedom." Her own interpretation produced evening dresses of elegant simplicity. Departing from the chemise, her clothes returned to an awareness of the body beneath the evening dress.

Style gallery 1920–26

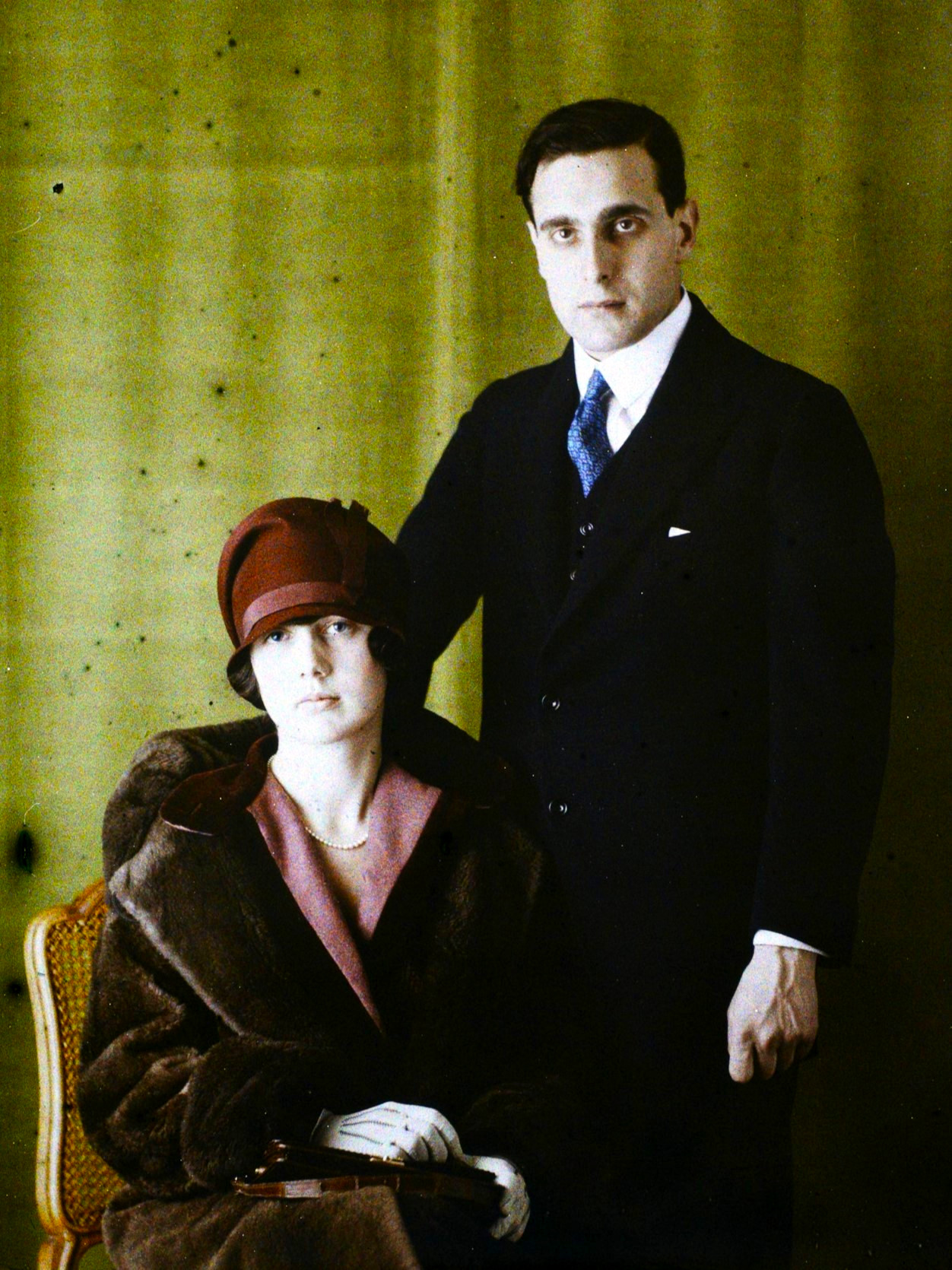
Autochrome Lumière of Sir Siegmund Warburg with his wife Eva Maria Warburg in Paris, 1926.

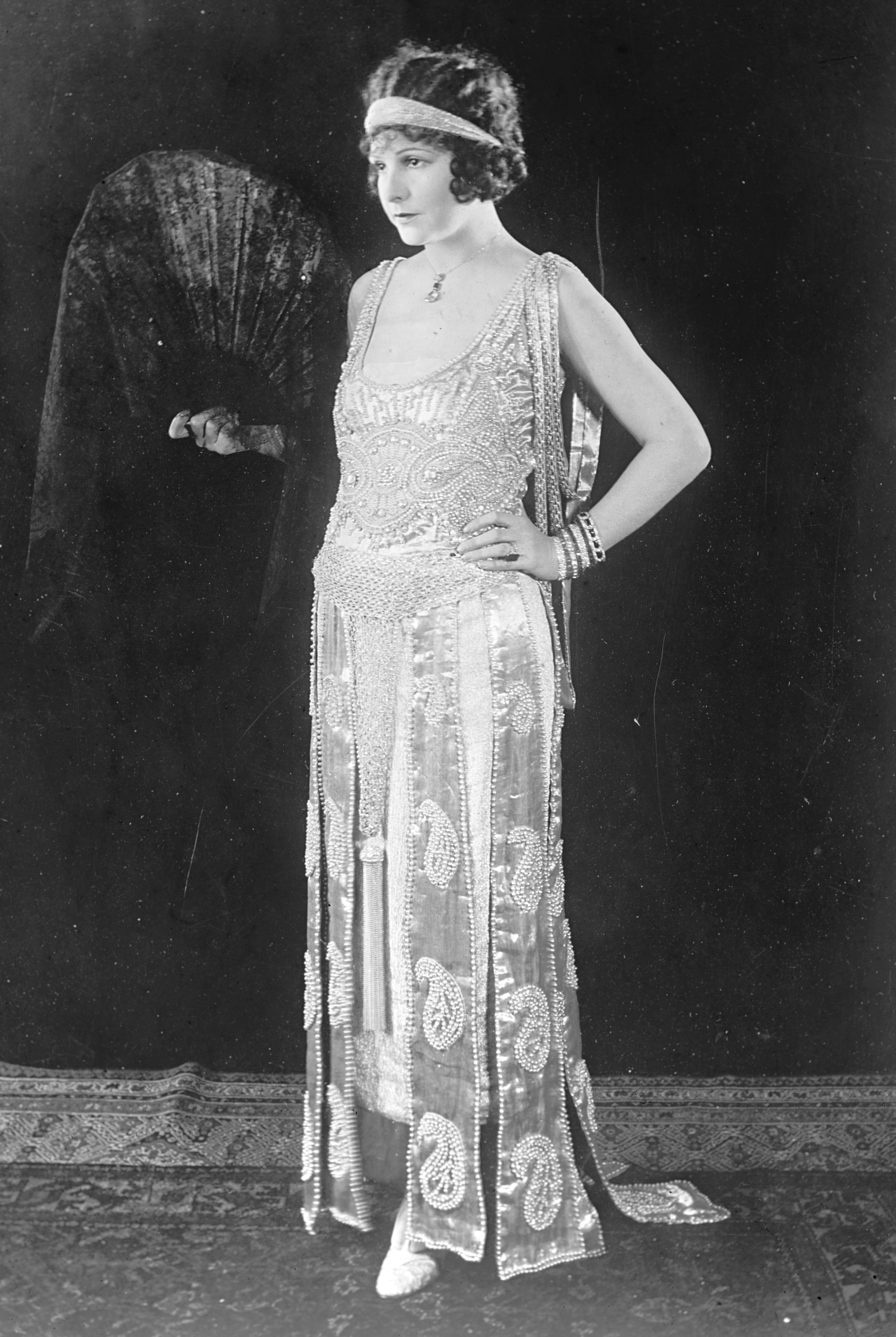
Actress Norma Talmadge in formal wear, early 1920s.

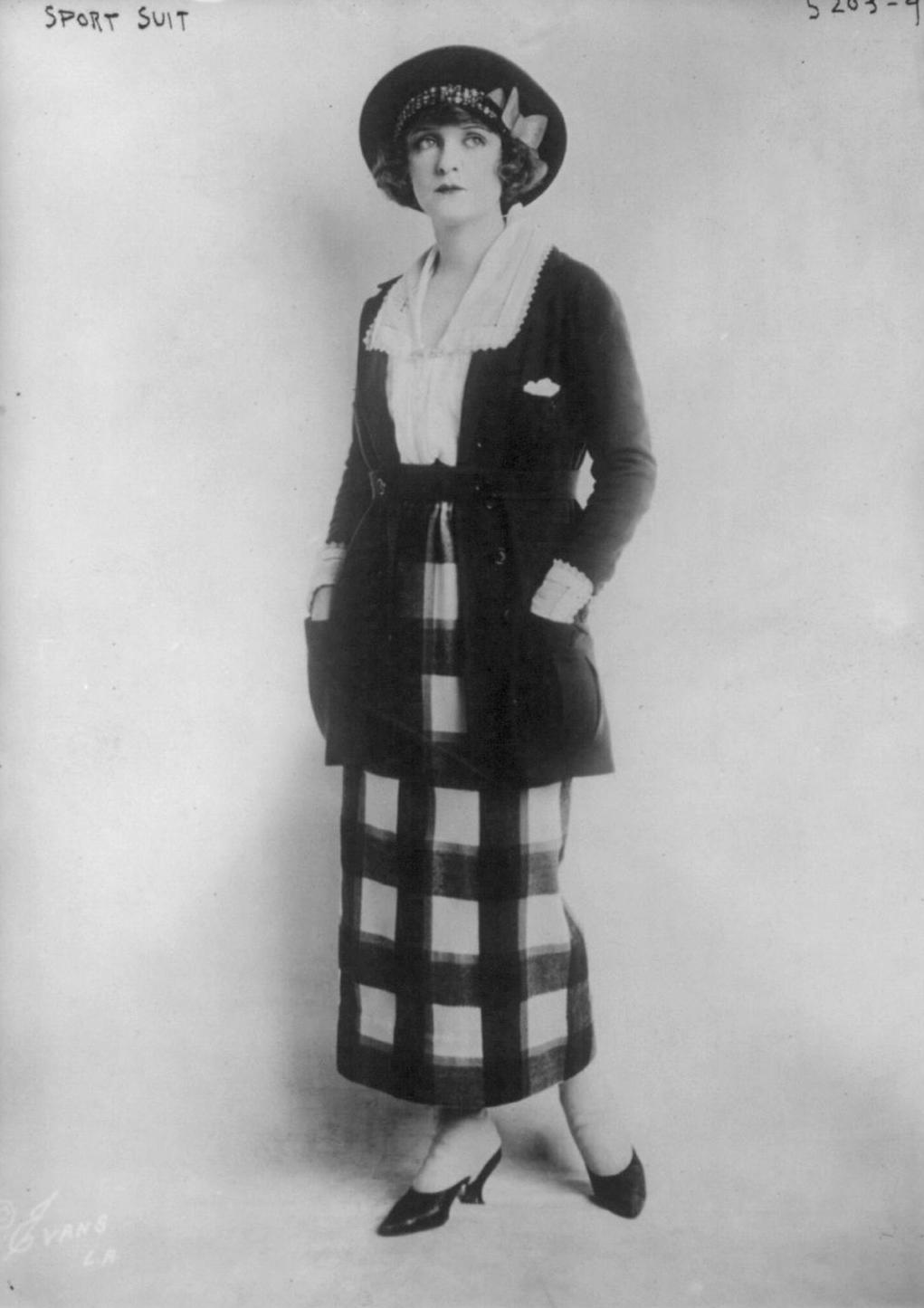
Summer sport suit, 1920.

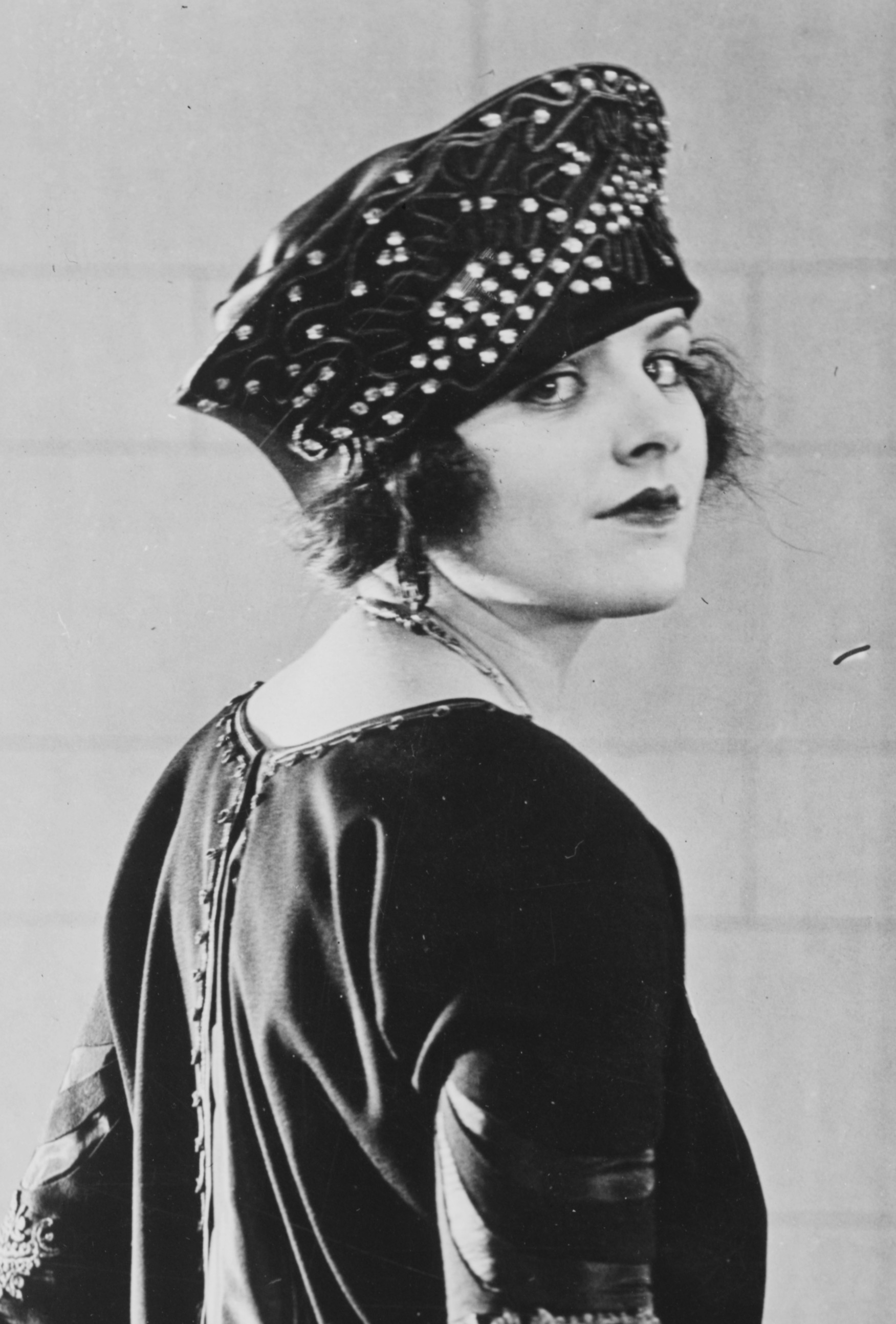
Actress Elaine Hammerstein, 1921. The forehead was usually covered in the 1920s, here by a hat reaching to the eyebrows.

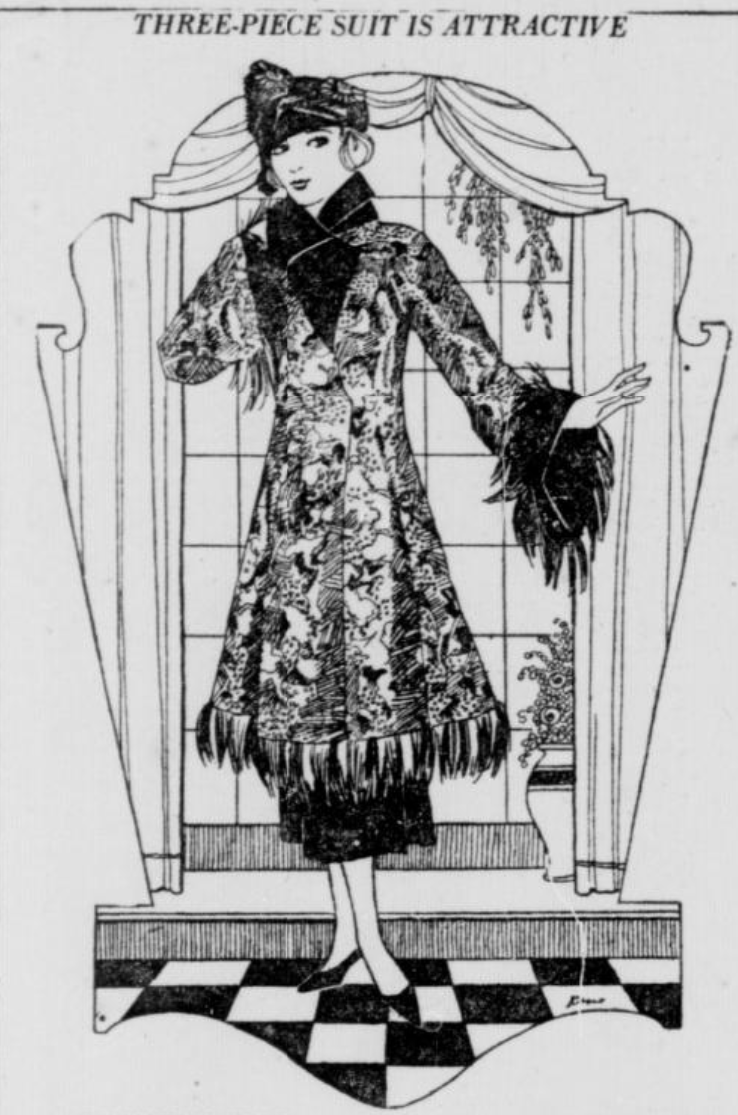
Clothing advertisement, November 1921, showing fur trim and forehead-covering hat.

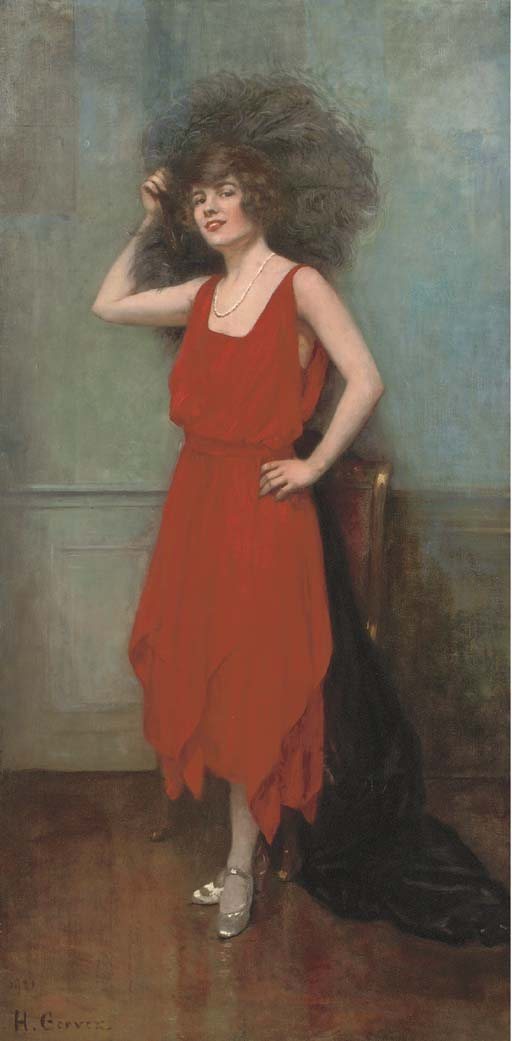
Evening dress, 1921

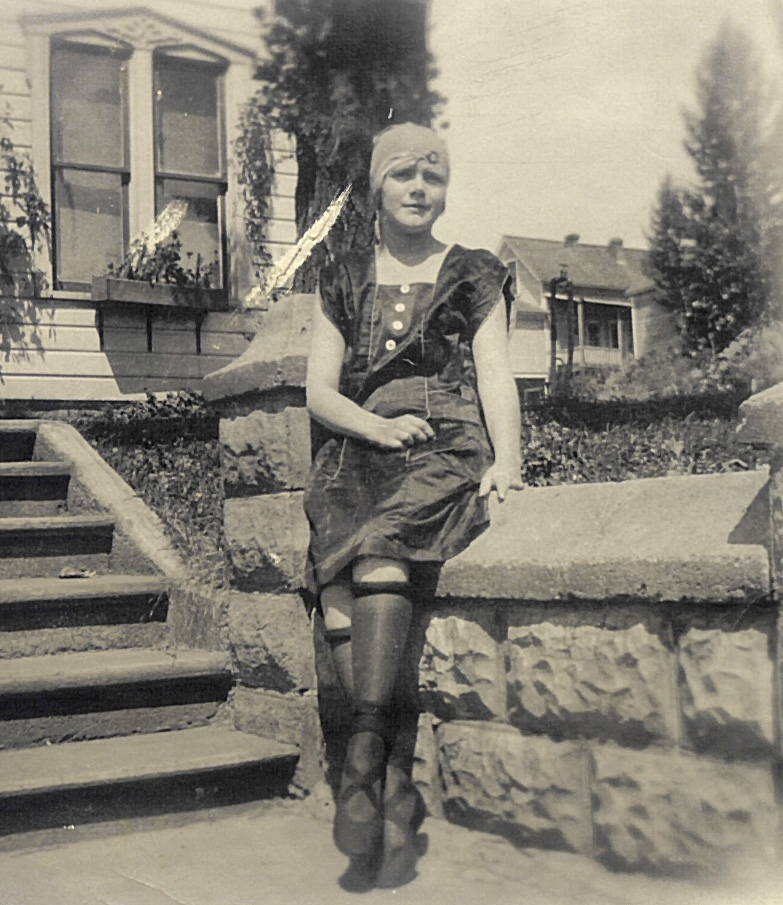
Rolled stockings, 1922.

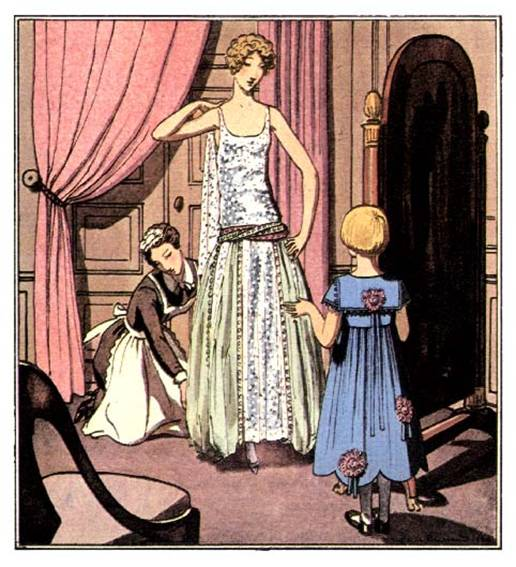
Robe de style, Lanvin, 1922.

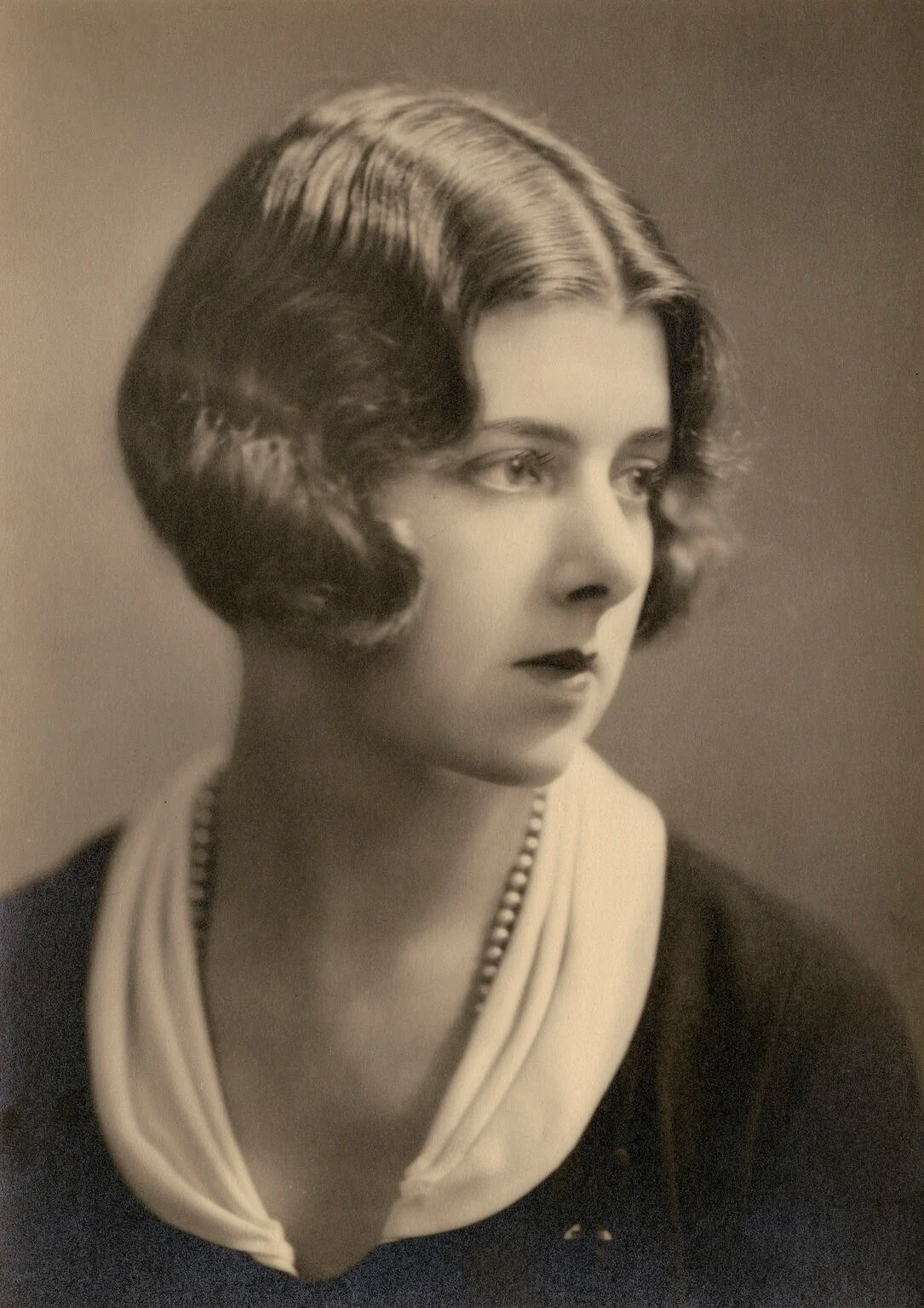
British novelist Angela du Maurier with bobbed hair, 1920s

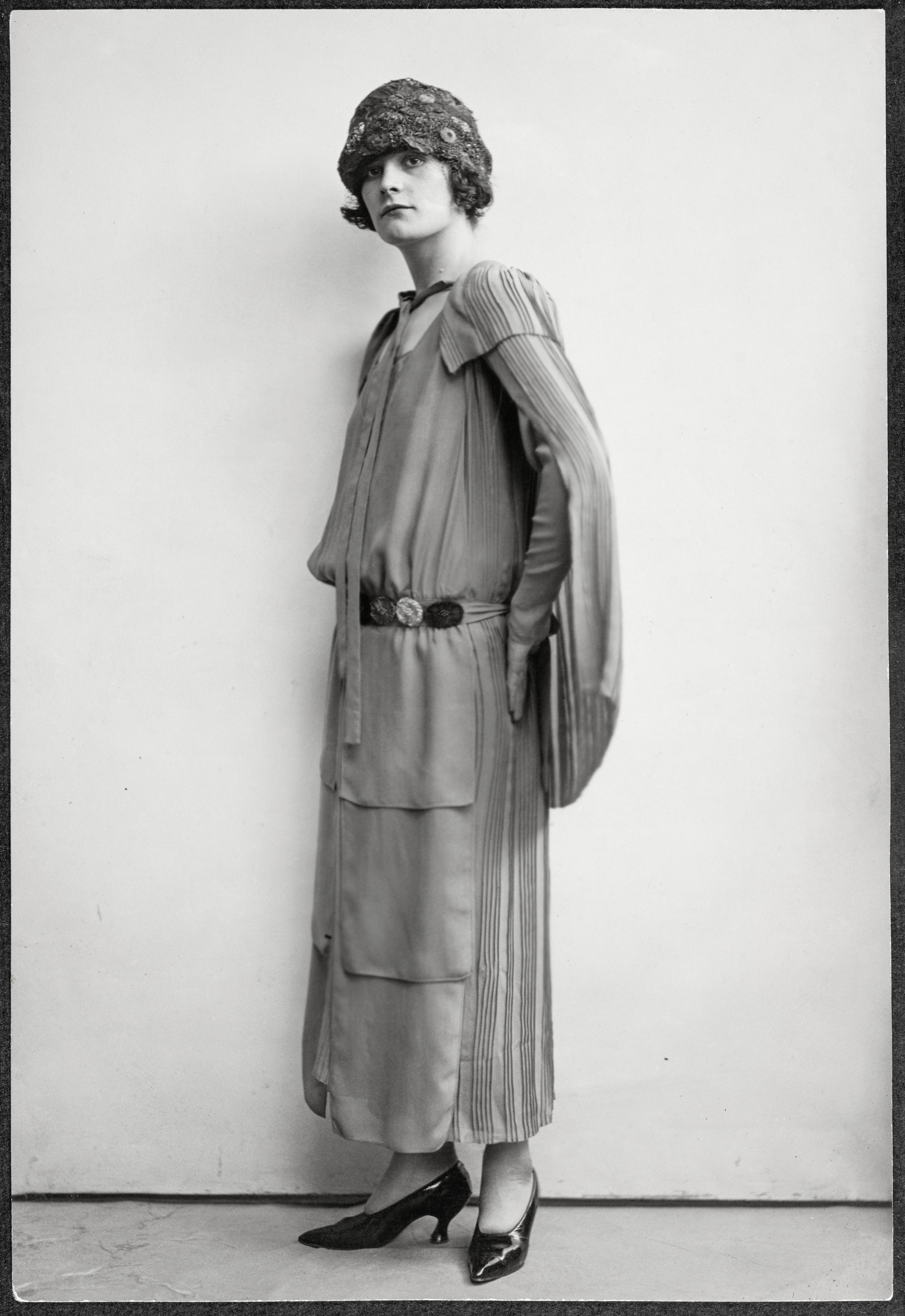
Greta Garbo in French fashion, autumn 1923

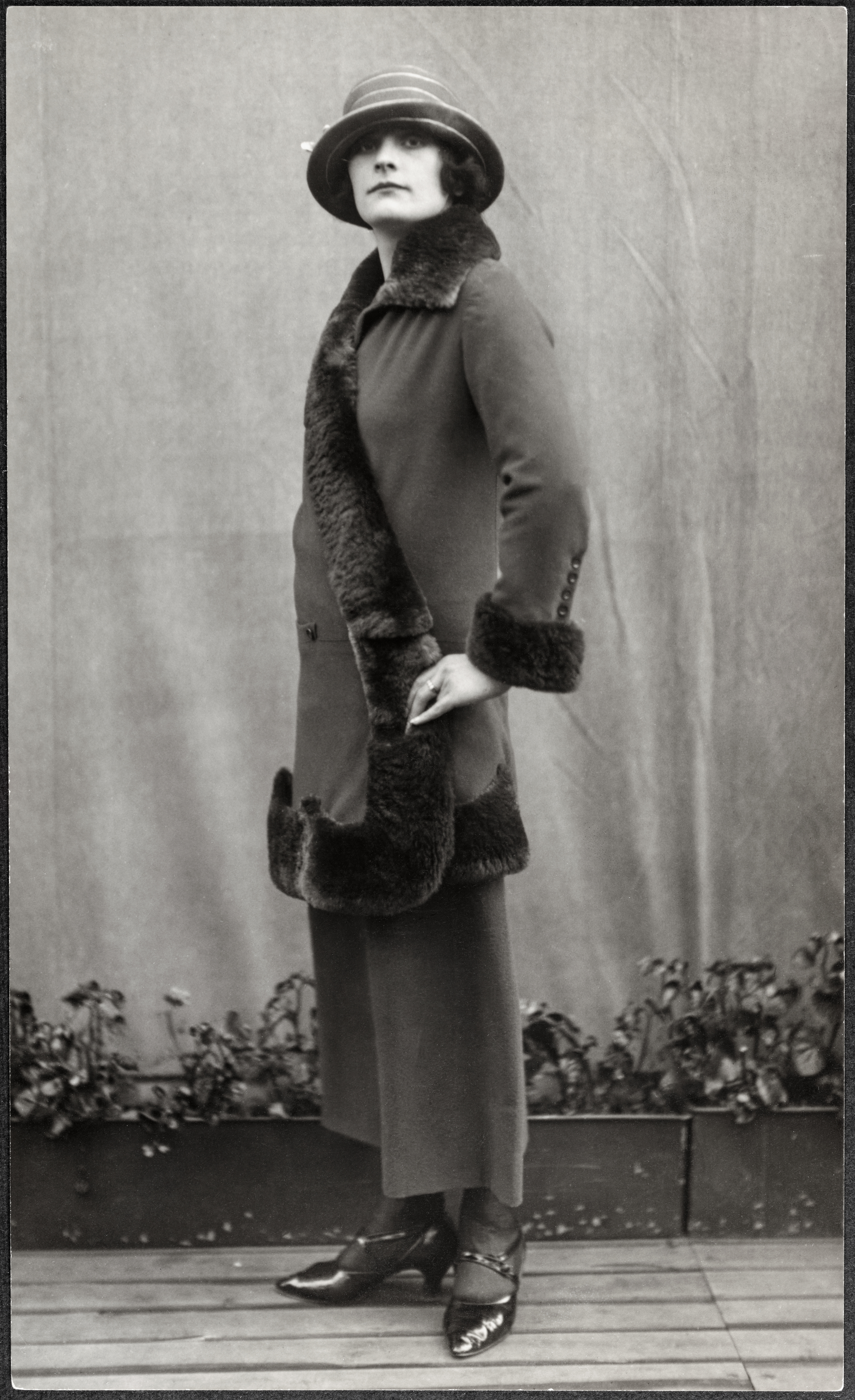
Greta Garbo in French fashion, autumn 1923

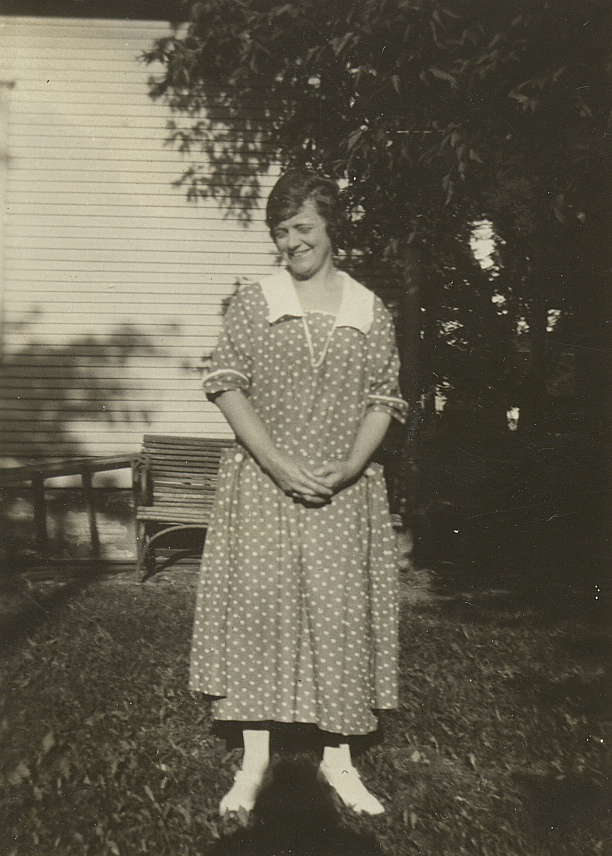
Dress with a dropped waist and width at the hips, 1923.

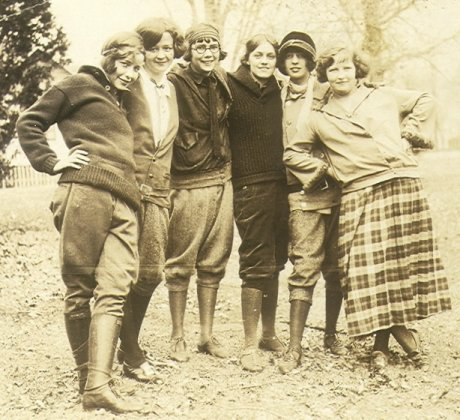
Teenage girls in Minnesota wearing breeches and riding boots with men's neckties, 1924.

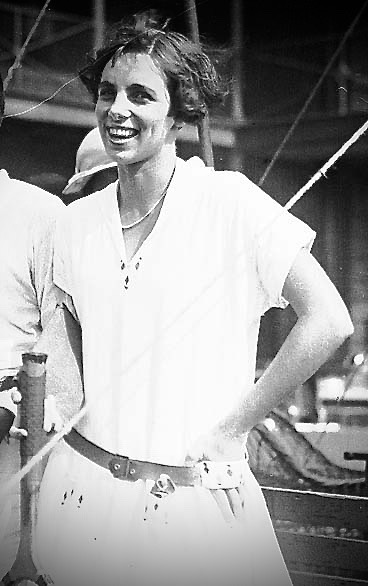
Tennis player, Australia, 1924.

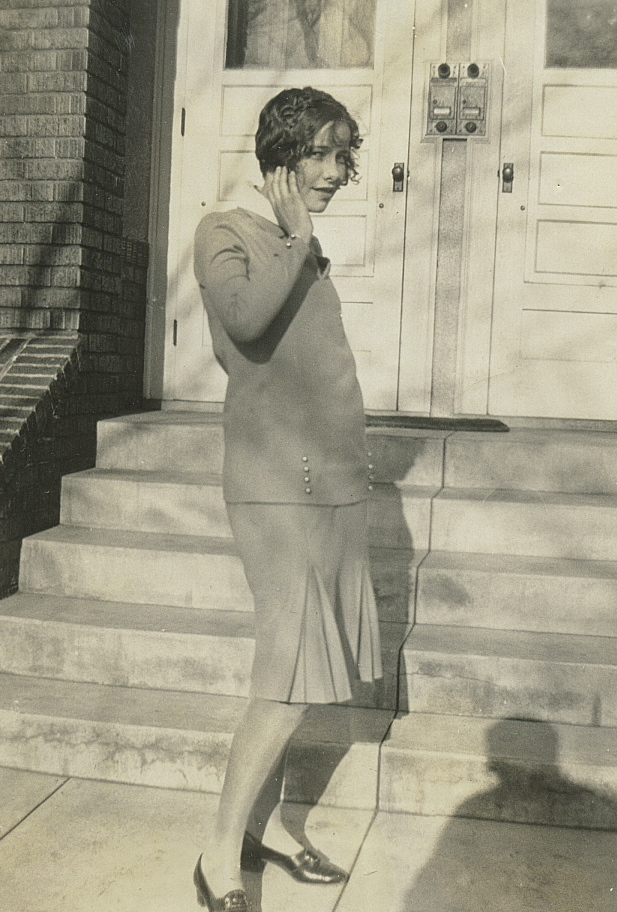
By 1925, skirts ended just below the knee. Tunic-tops and sweaters reaching to the hips were popular.

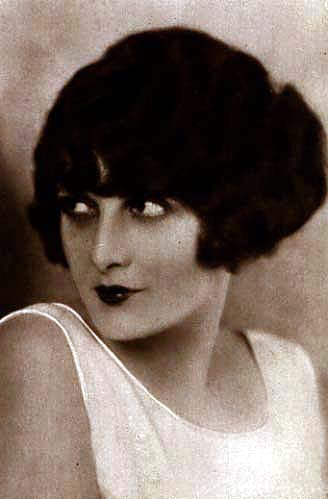
Actress Evelyn Brent, in the mid-1920s with bobbed hair.

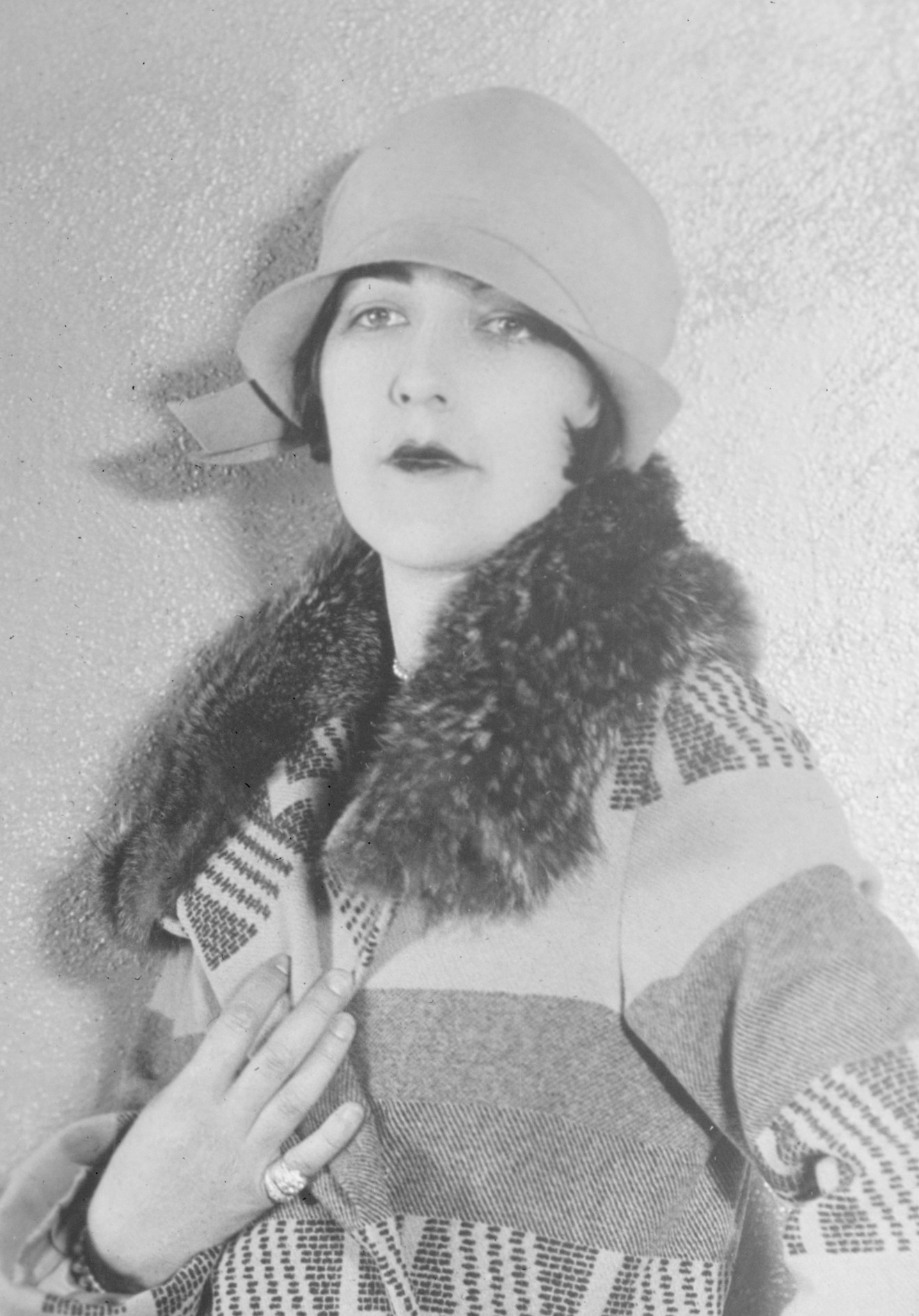
Actress Aileen Pringle wearing a cloche hat and boldly patterned coat, 1926.

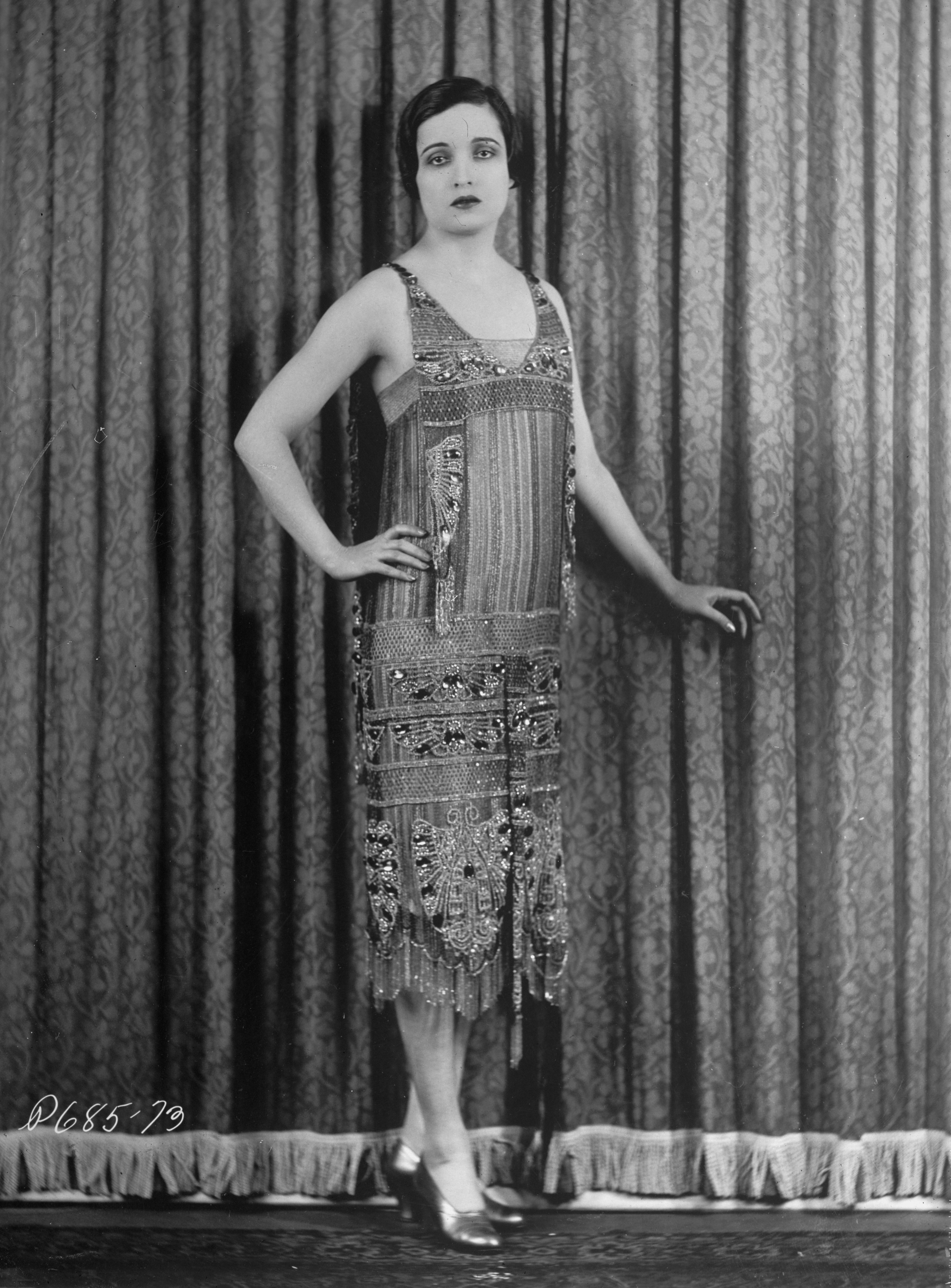
Actress Alice Joyce in a straight dress with a sheer beaded overdress, 1926.

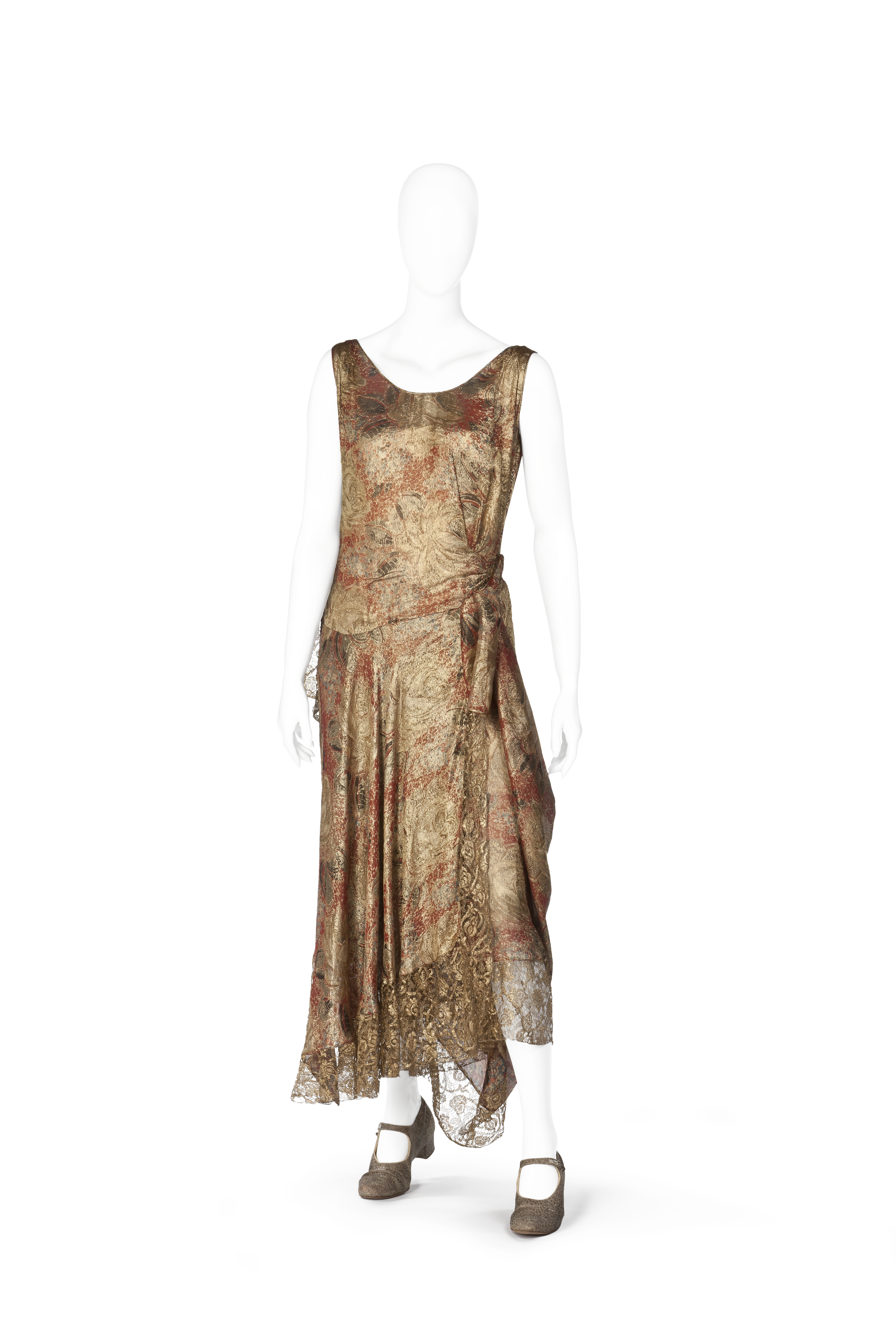
Evening dress, ca 1926.

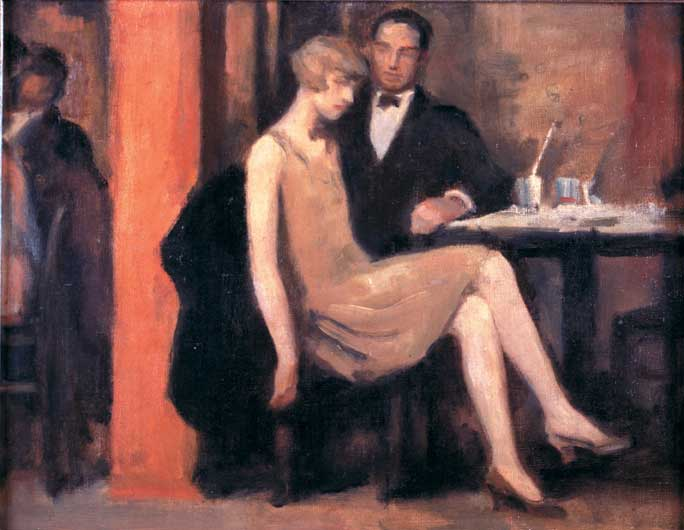
A painting showing the mid-decade silhouette at its simplest: languid pose, bobbed hair, knee-length dress with dropped waist, 1926.

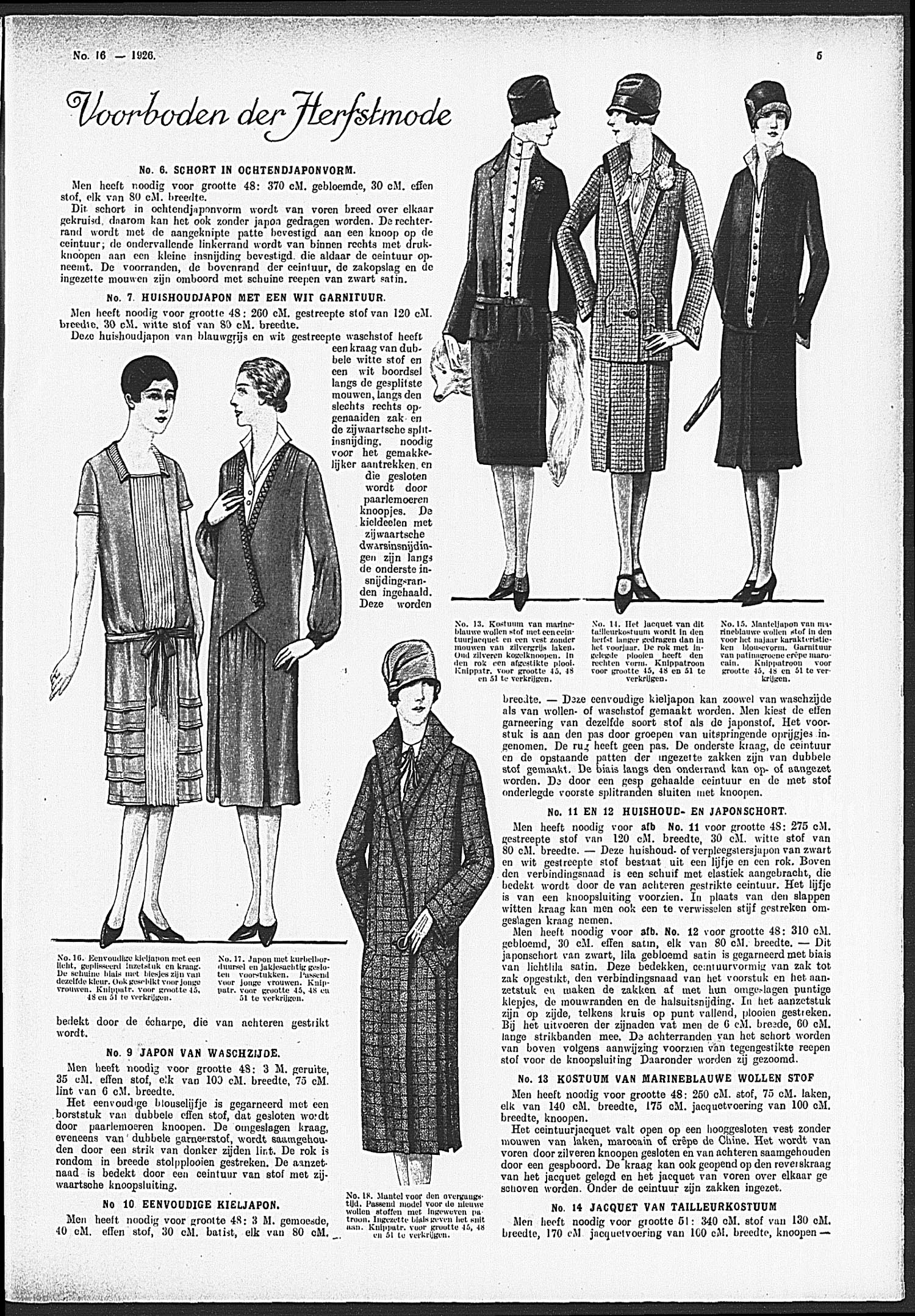
Autumn fashion, 1926.

Style gallery 1927–29

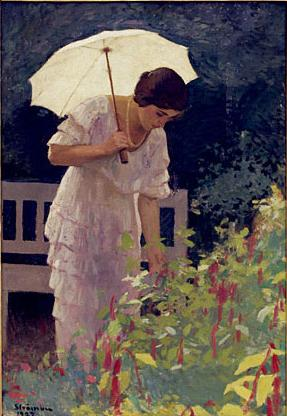
Woman with Umbrella, Ipolit Strâmbu, 1927. Designers used multiple hemlines (here, tiers of ruffles) to accustom the eye to longer skirts. This dress foreshadows the higher waist and feminine look that spread to everyday fashion by the early 1930s.

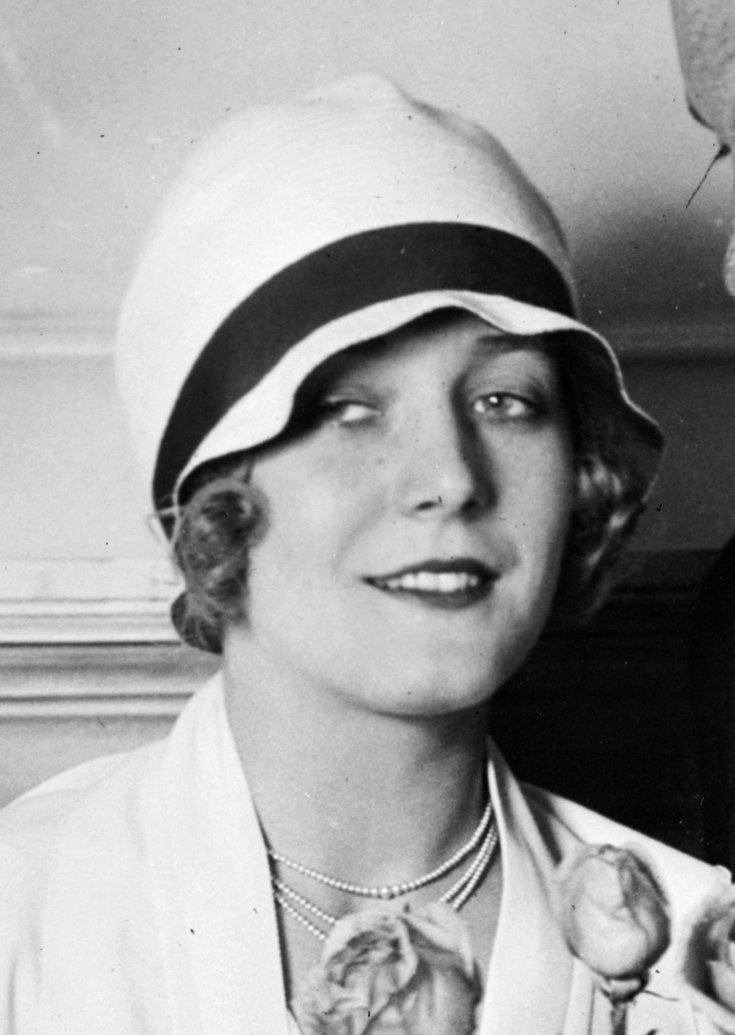
Actress Vilma Bánky wearing cloche hat, 1927.

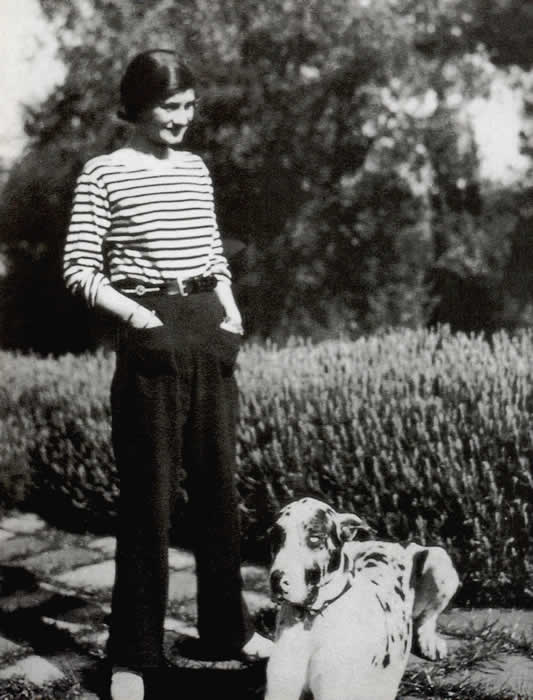
Coco Chanel wearing trousers and a sailor's jersey, 1928.

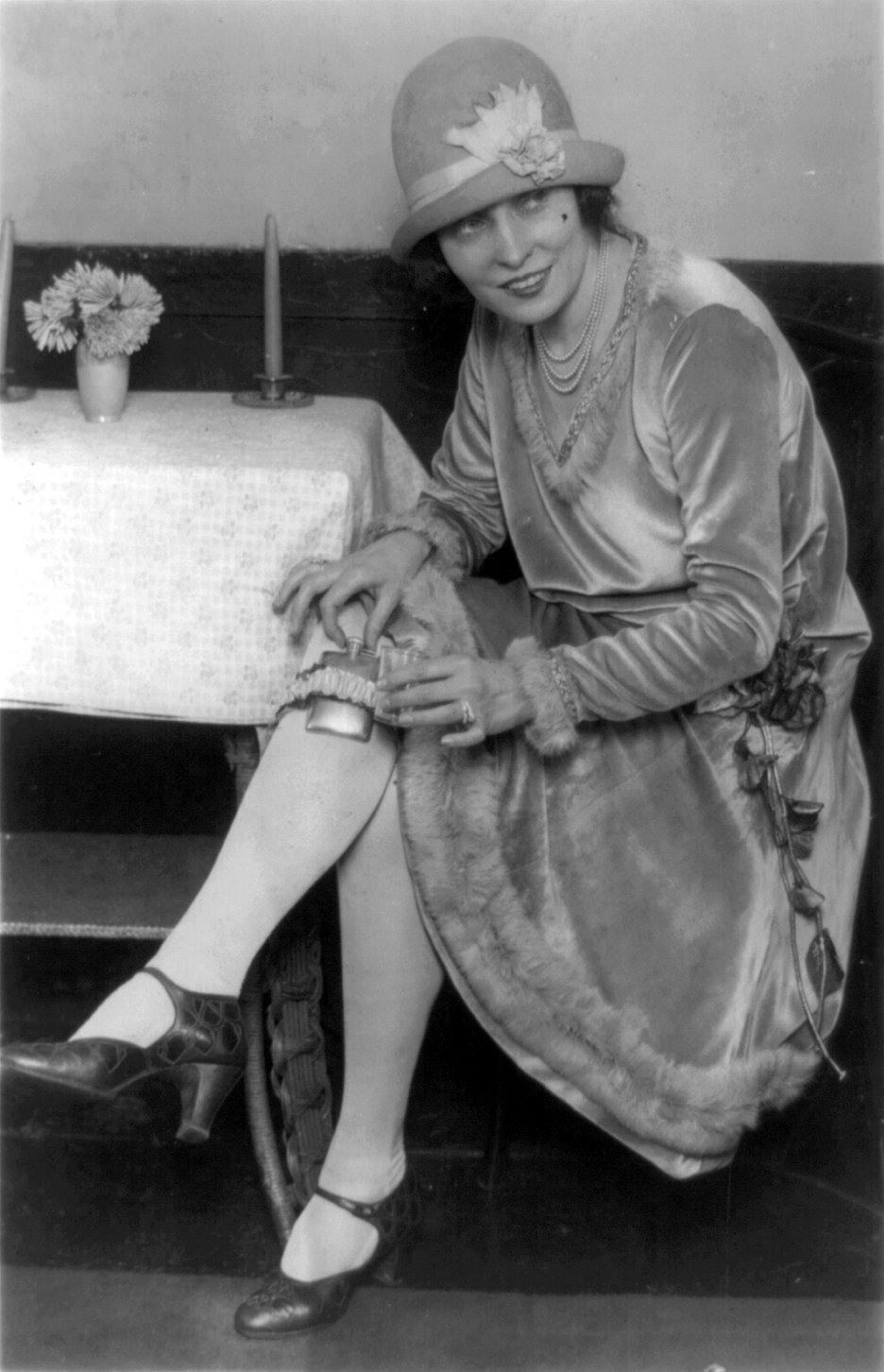
Woman hiding a hip flask tucked in her garter belt during Prohibition, late 1920s.

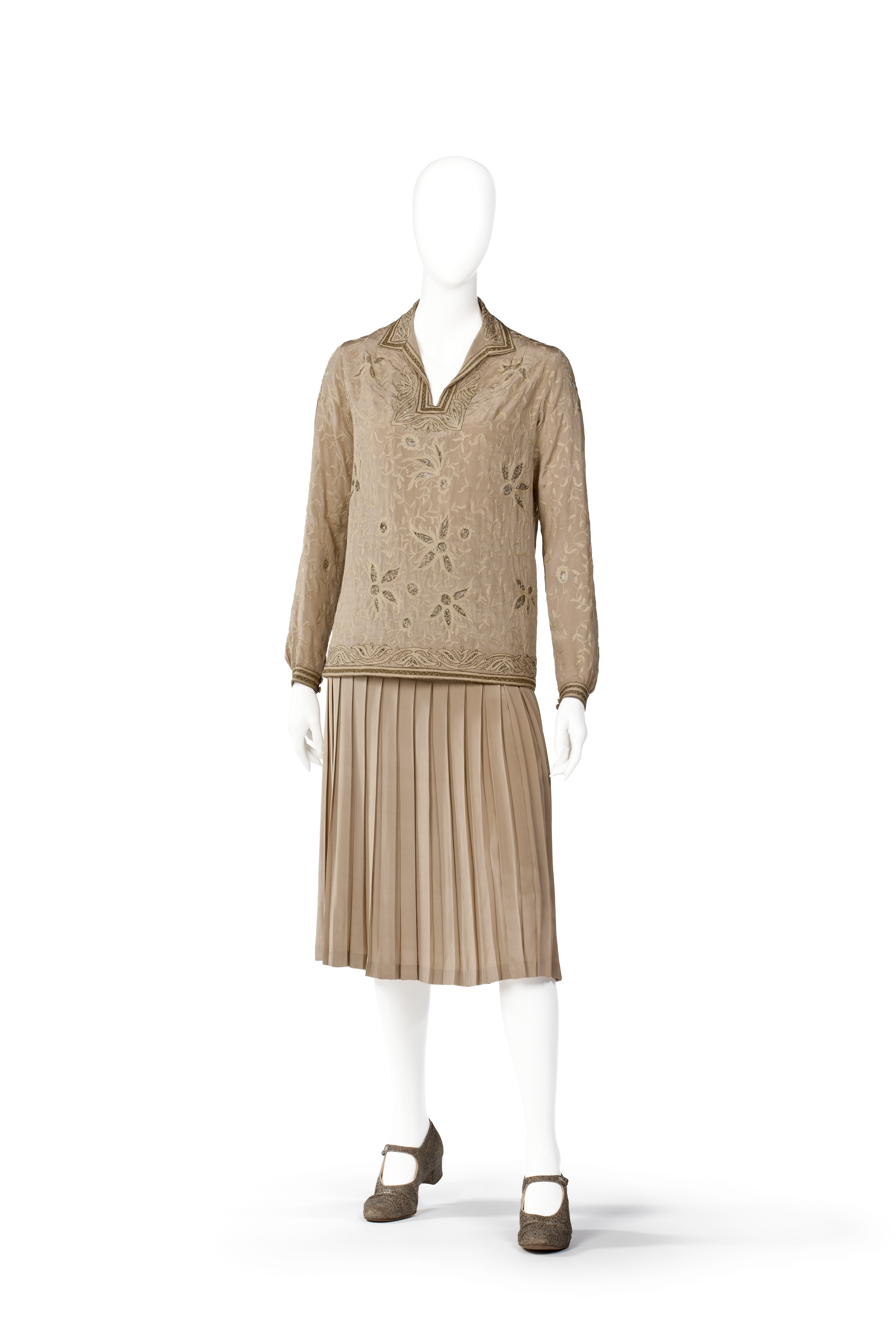
Blouse and pleated skirt ca 1927

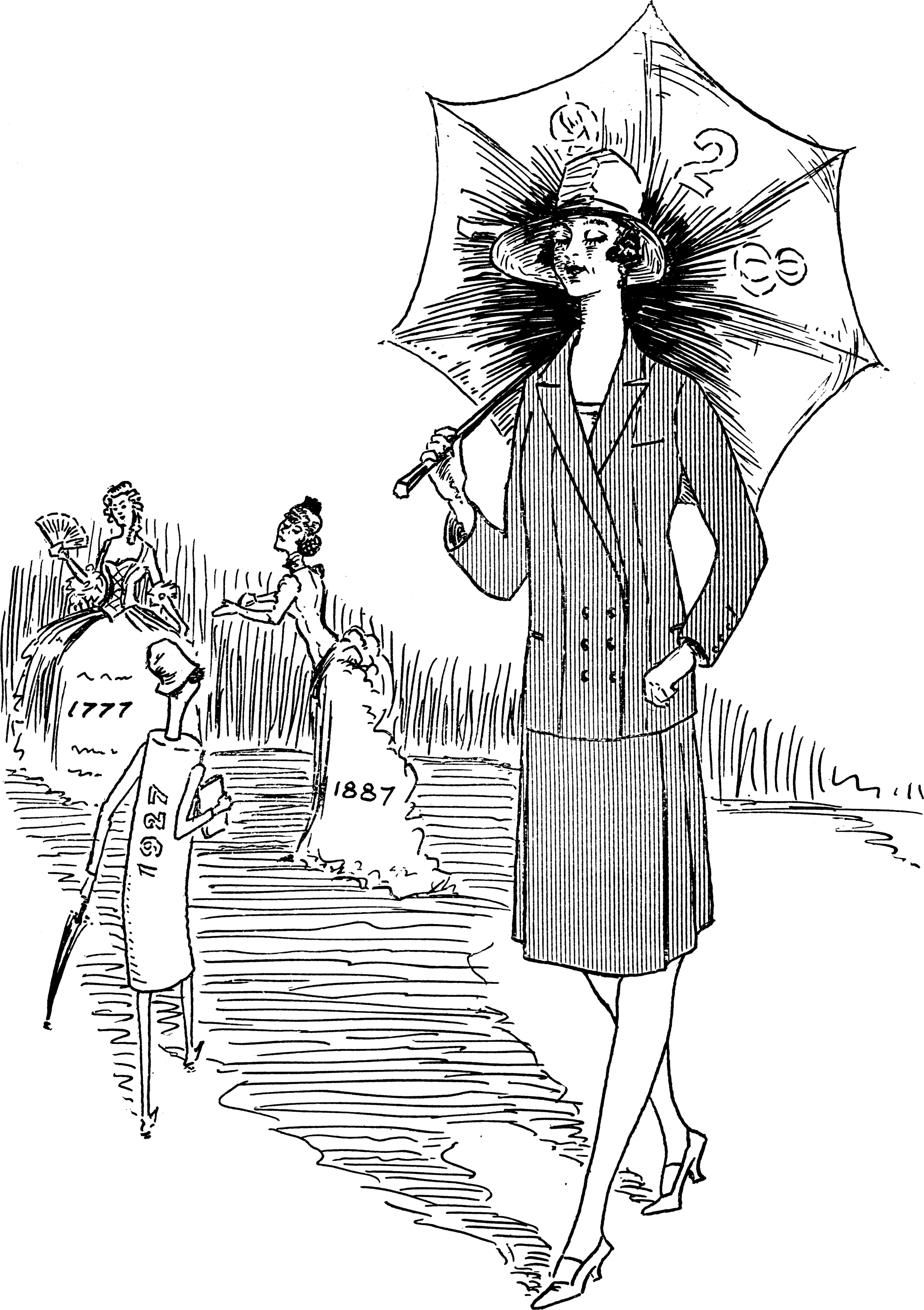
May 1928, abdomen and curves. After many years of a "stovepipe" silhouette, "natural" curves were beginning to reappear.

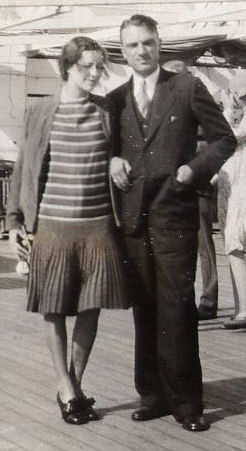
Knee-length, pleated skirts and dropped waists were still popular as everyday clothes in 1929, though Paris designers were already showing longer skirts and higher waistlines.

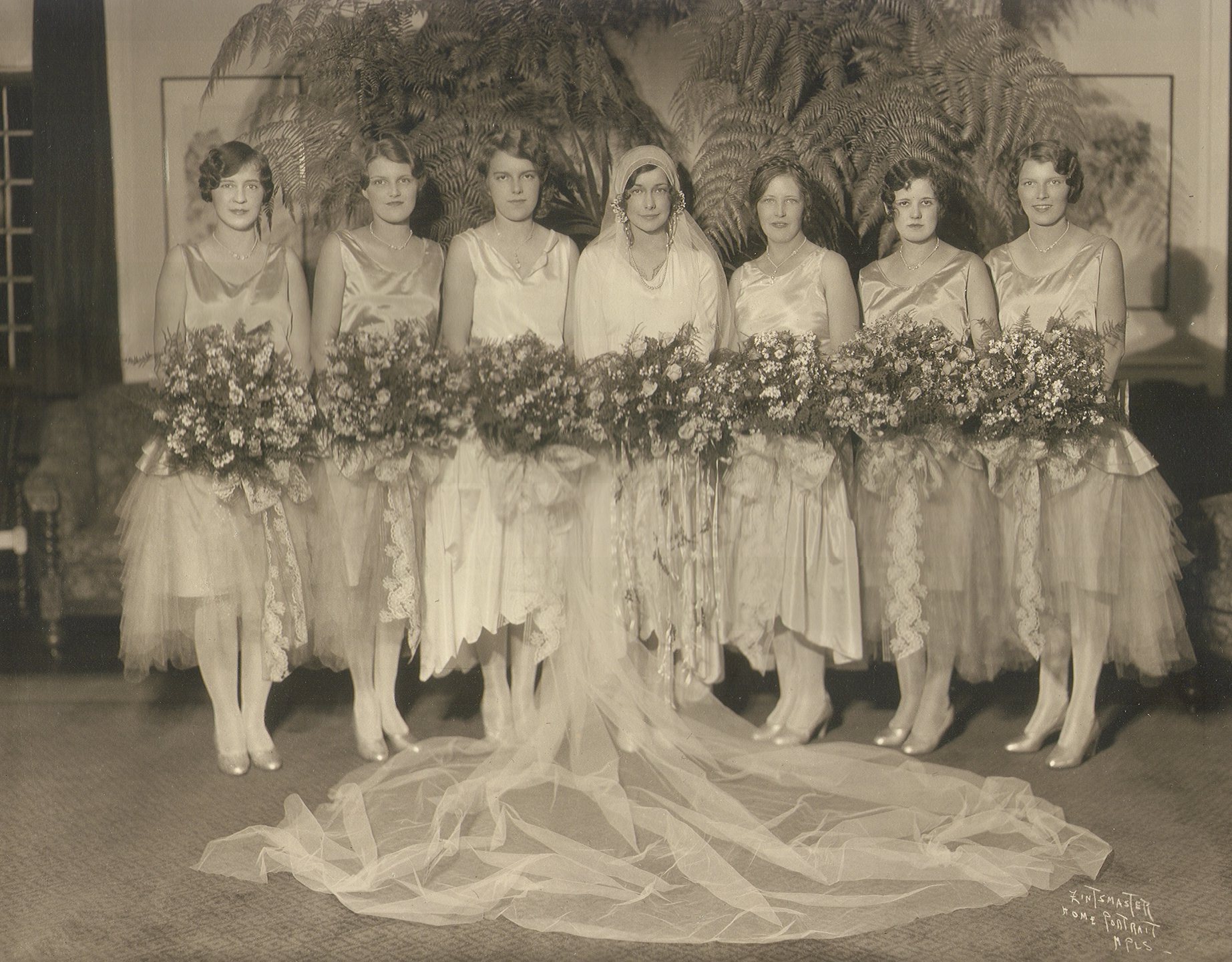
Bridesmaids gowns of 1929 have knee-length underskirts and longer, sheer over skirts, foreshadowing the trend toward longer skirts. Minnesota, 1929.

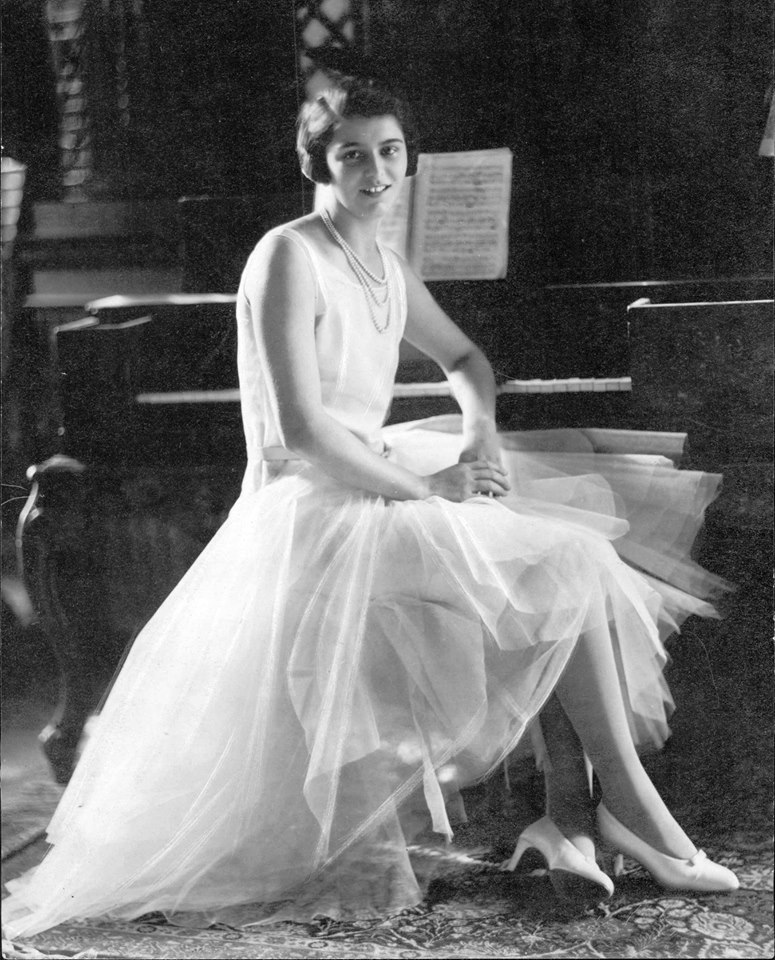
An Argentine aristocrat wearing a robe de style in 1929.

== Men's wear ==
In men's wear, there were two distinct periods in the 1920s. Throughout the decade, men wore short suit jackets, the old long jackets being used merely for formal occasions. In the early 1920s, men's fashion was characterized by extremely high-waisted jackets, often worn with belts. Lapels on suit jackets were not very wide as they tended to be buttoned up high. This style of jacket seems to have been greatly influenced by the uniforms worn by the military during the First World War. Trousers were relatively narrow and straight and they were worn rather short so that a man's socks often showed. Trousers also began to be worn cuffed at the bottom at this time.

By 1925, wider trousers commonly known as Oxford bags came into fashion, while suit jackets returned to a normal waist and lapels became wider and were often worn peaked. Loose-fitting sleeves without a taper also began to be worn during this period. During the late 1920s, double-breasted vests, often worn with a single-breasted jacket, also became quite fashionable. During the 1920s, men had a variety of sport clothes available to them, including sweaters and short trousers (commonly known in American English as knickers). For formal occasions in the daytime, a morning suit was usually worn. For evening wear men preferred the short tuxedo to the tail coat, which was now seen as rather old-fashioned and snobby.

Men's fashion also became less regimented and formal. Men favored short jackets with two or three buttons rather than jackets with long tailcoats as well as pinstriped suits. Casual-wear for men often included knickers, short pants that came to the knee. The most formal men's suit consisted of a black or midnight-blue worsted swallow-tailed coat trimmed with satin, and a pair of matching trousers, trimmed down the sides with wide braid or satin ribbon. A white bow tie, black silk top hat, white gloves, patent leather Oxford shoes, a white silk handkerchief, and a white flower boutonnière completed the outfit. The tuxedo vest could be black or white, but, unlike the obligatory full-dress white tie, tuxedos ties were always black. Men usually completed their tuxedo outfit with all the same accessories as the full-dress suit, except that instead of top hats they would wear dark, dome-shaped hats called bowlers. Just like women, men had certain attire that was worn for certain events. Tuxedos were appropriate attire at the theater, small dinner parties, entertaining in the home, and dining in a restaurant. During the early 1920s, most men's dress shirts had, instead of a collar, a narrow neckband with a buttonhole in both the front and back. By the mid-1920s, however, many men preferred shirts with attached collars, which were softer and more comfortable than rigid, detachable collars.

Men's hats

Men's hats were usually worn depending on their class, with upper class citizens usually wearing top hats or a homburg hat. Middle-class men wore either a fedora, bowler hat, or a trilby hat. During the summer months, a straw boater was popular for upper class and middle-class men. Working-class men wore a standard newsboy cap or a flat cap.

Style gallery

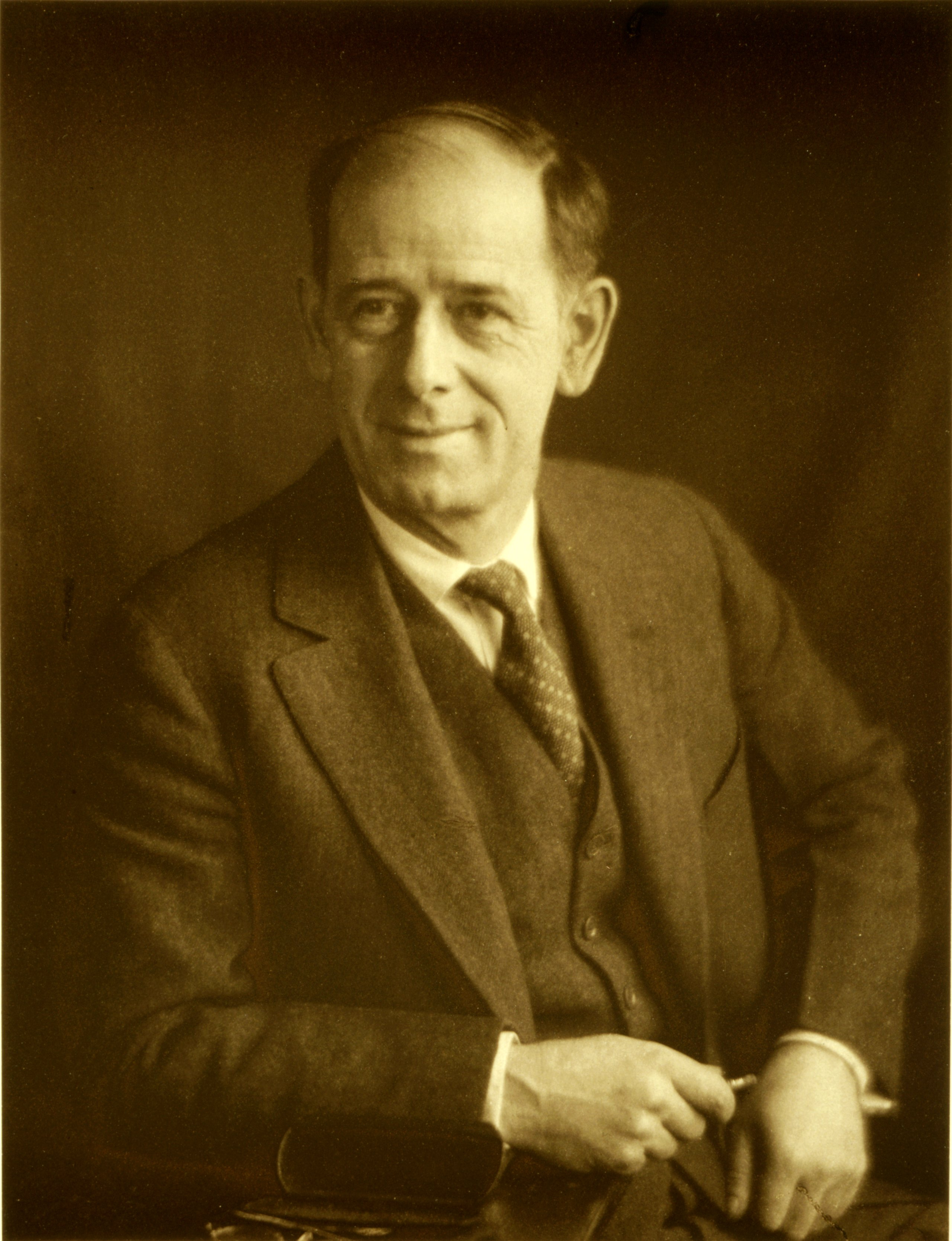
Photographer Clarence Hudson White, c. 1920.

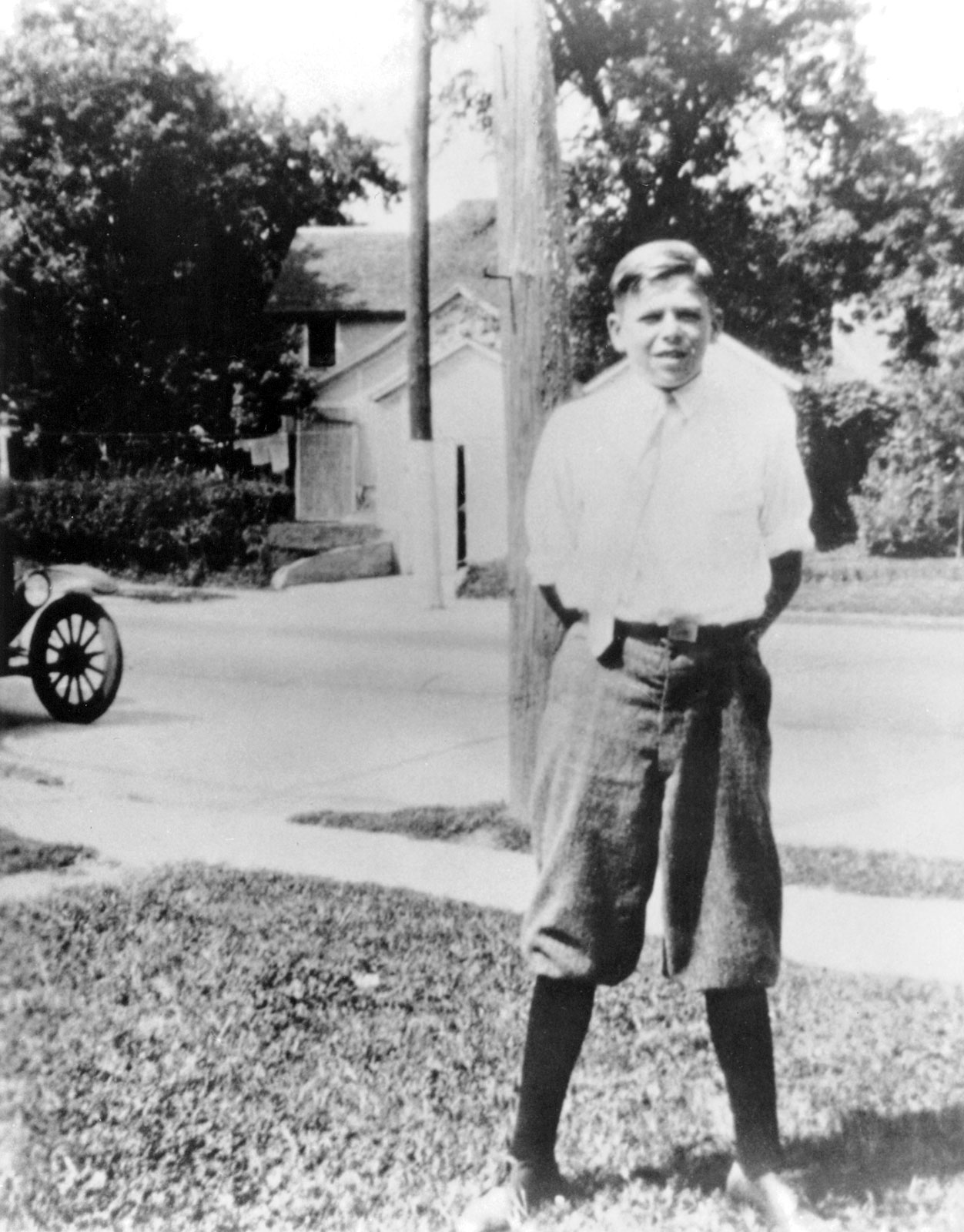
Ronald Reagan as a teenager wearing knickerbockers, 1920s.

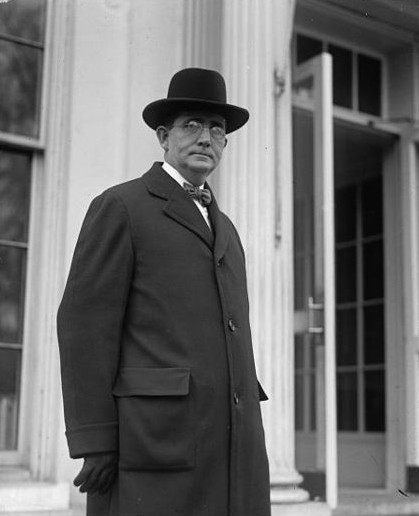
Politician William J. Fields wearing an overcoat and soft-crowned hat with a bow tie, December 1923.

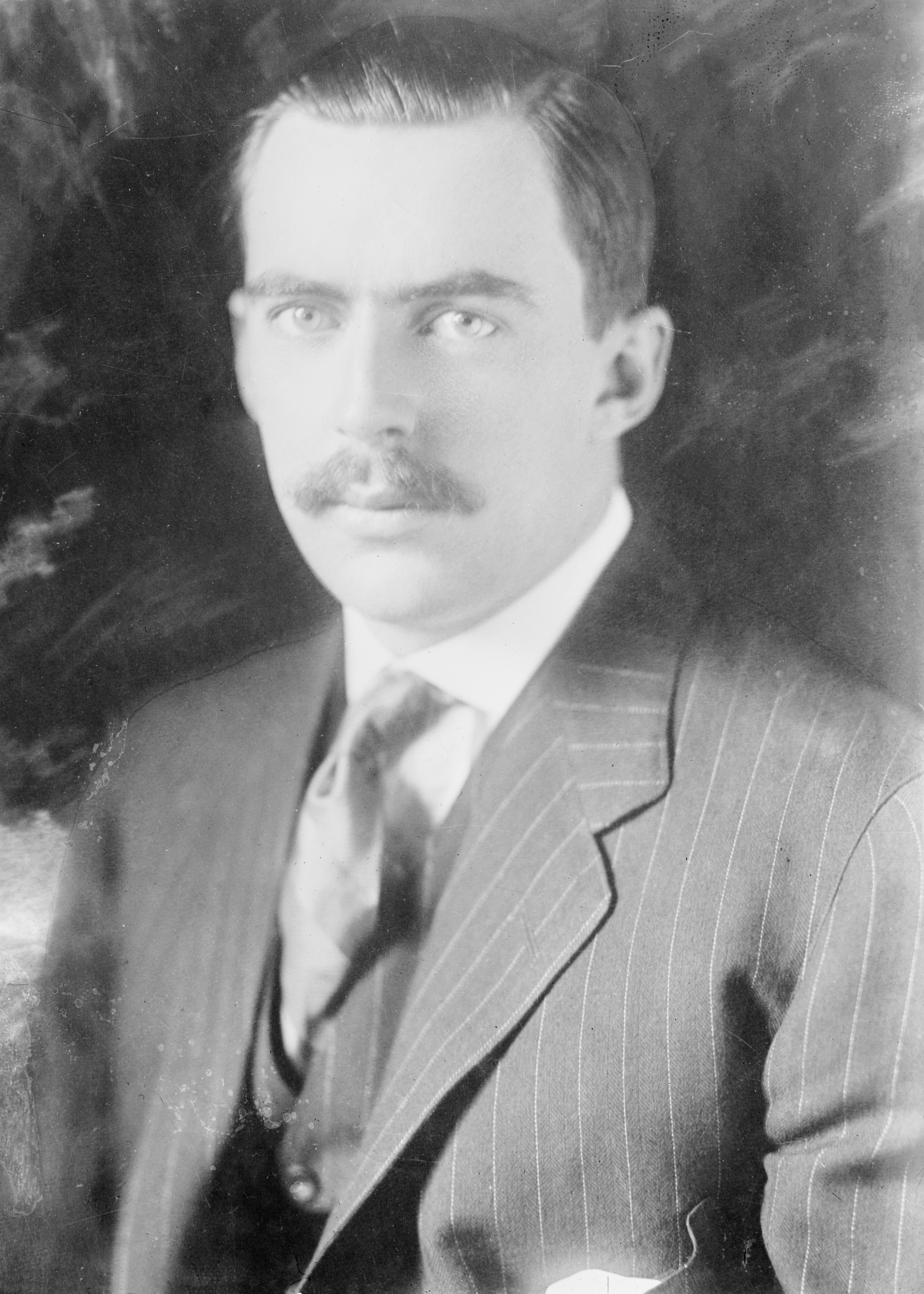
Publisher Edward Beale McLean wearing a three-piece striped suit with a spread-collar shirt, 1924.

British playwright and actor Noël Coward in a jumper

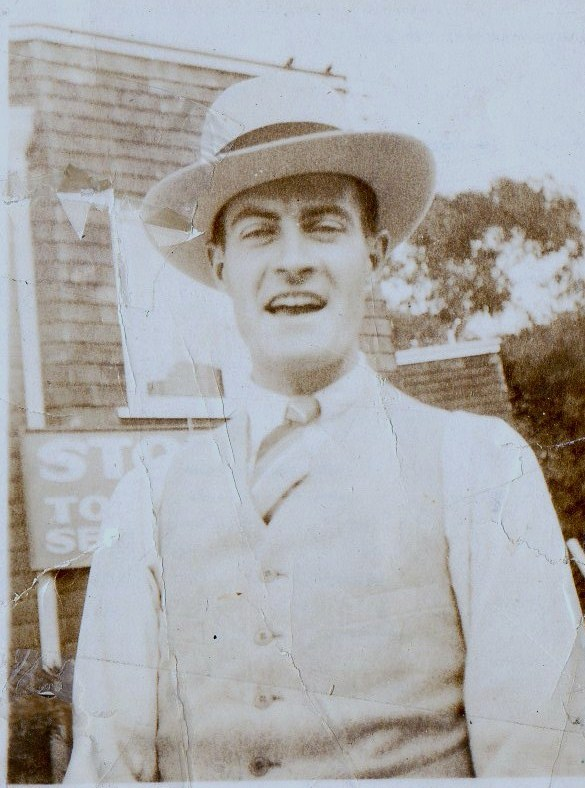
Man wearing a Panama hat and buttoned waistcoat, 1927.

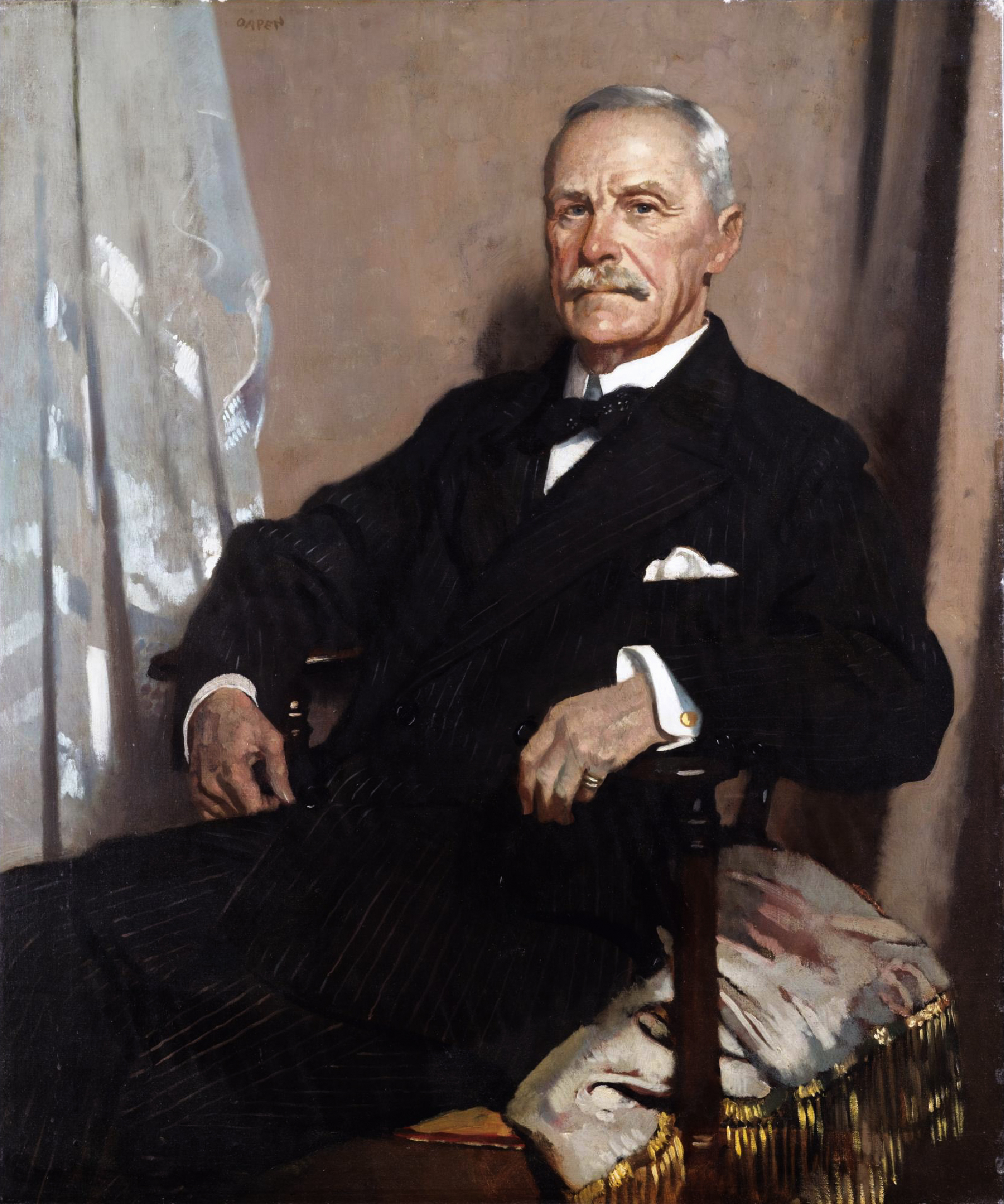
Charles Lawrence, 1st Baron Lawrence of Kingsgate wearing a stiff collar and bow tie, 1927.

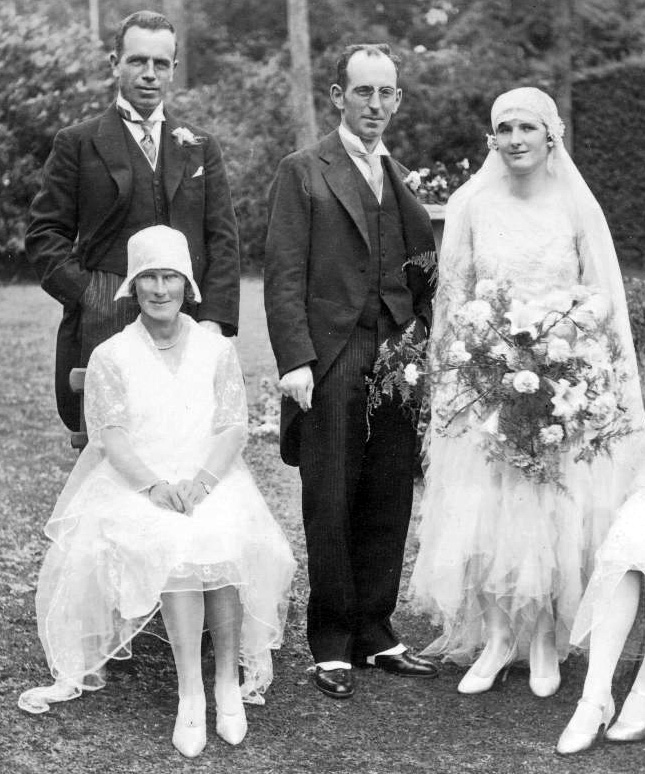
Men wearing morning dress and spats in wedding photo, 1929.

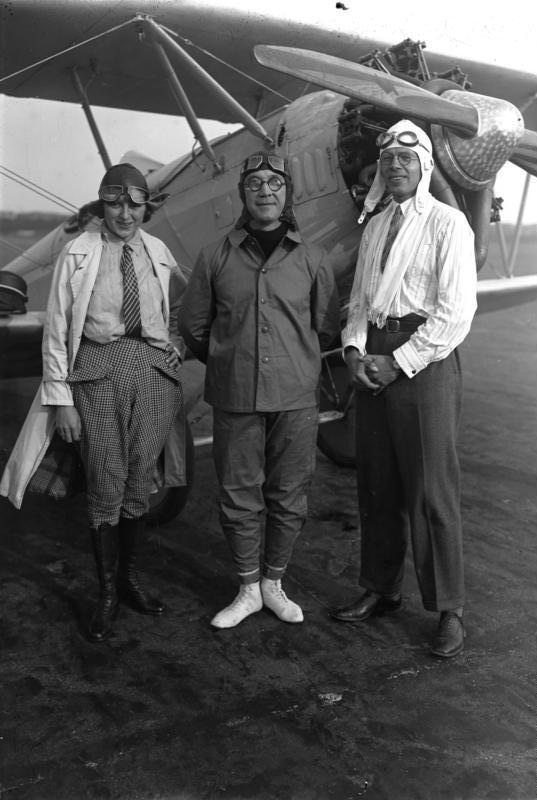
German aviators, one a prince, 1929.

== Fashion influences and trends ==
During the 1920s, the notion of keeping up with fashion trends and expressing oneself through material goods seized middle-class Americans as never before. Purchasing new clothes, new appliances, new automobiles, new anything indicated one's level of prosperity. Being considered old-fashioned, out-of-date, or—worse yet—unable to afford stylish new products was a fate many Americans went to great lengths to avoid.

For women, face, figure, coiffure, posture, and grooming had become important fashion factors in addition to clothing. In particular, cosmetics became a major industry. Women did not feel ashamed for caring about their appearance and it was a declaration of self-worth and vanity, hence why they no longer wanted to achieve a natural look. For evenings and events, the popular look was a smoky eye with long lashes, rosy cheeks and a bold lip. To emphasize the eyes, Kohl eyeliner became popular, and was the first time they knew anything of eyeliner (information about Egyptian fashion was not discovered until later on in the 1920s). Women also started wearing foundation and using pressed powder. Also, with the invention of the swivel lipstick, lipstick was on the rise with bright colors and they applied their lipstick to achieve a cupid's bow and "bee stung" look.

Glamour was now an important fashion trend due to the influence of the motion picture industry and the famous female movie stars. Style, at many social levels, was heavily influenced by the newly created, larger-than-life movie stars. For the first time in history, fashion influences and trends were coming from more than one source. Not unlike today, women and men of the 1920s looked to movie stars as their fashion icons. Women and men wanted to emulate the styles of Hollywood stars such as Louise Brooks, Greta Garbo, Rudolph Valentino, and Clark Gable.

== Work clothes ==
For working class women in the 1920s, tailored suits with a straight, curve less cut were popular. Throughout the decade, the lengths of skirts were rise to the knee and then to the ankle various times affecting the skirt style of tailored suits. Rayon, an artificial silk fabric, was most common for working-class women clothing.

For working-class men in the 1920s, suits were popular. Depending on the job title and season of the year, the suit would change. These would have featured high lapels and were often made of thick wool material before the advent of central heating.

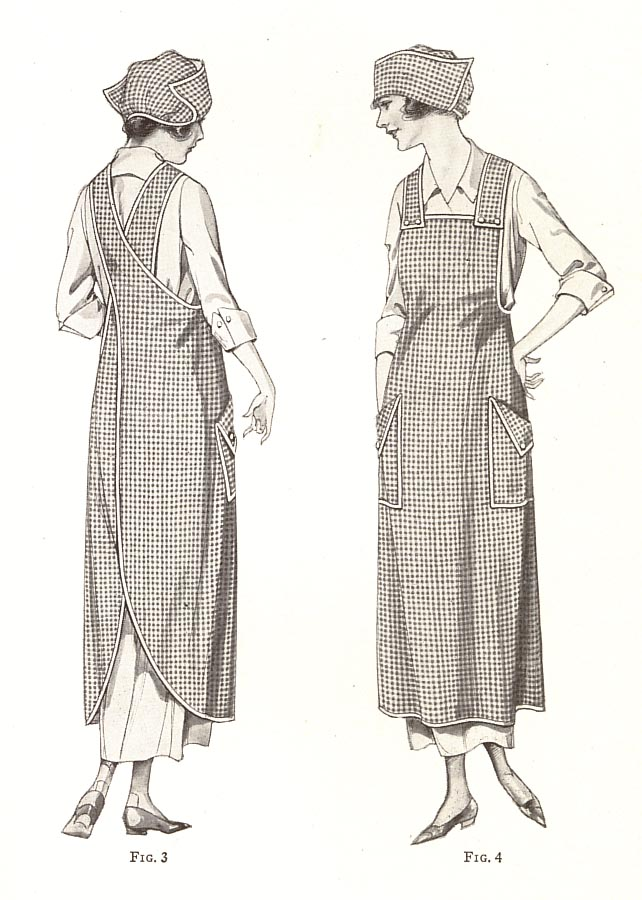
An apron and dutch cap, 1922

== Children's fashion ==
Fashion for children started to become more stylish and comfortable in the 1920s. Clothes were made out of cotton and wool rather than silk, lace, and velvet. Clothes were also made more sturdy in order to withstand play. During previous decades, many layers were worn; however, during the 1920s, minimal layers became the new standard.

For girls, clothing became looser and shorter. Dresses and skirts were now knee length and loose fitting. Shoes were also made out of canvas, making them lighter and easier to wear.

For boys, knee-length trousers were worn all year long and would be accompanied by ankle socks and canvas shoes. Pullovers and cardigans were also worn when the weather became cooler.

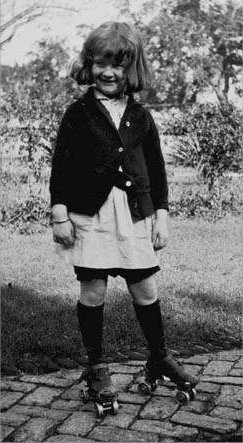
Roller-skater, Mississippi, 1921.

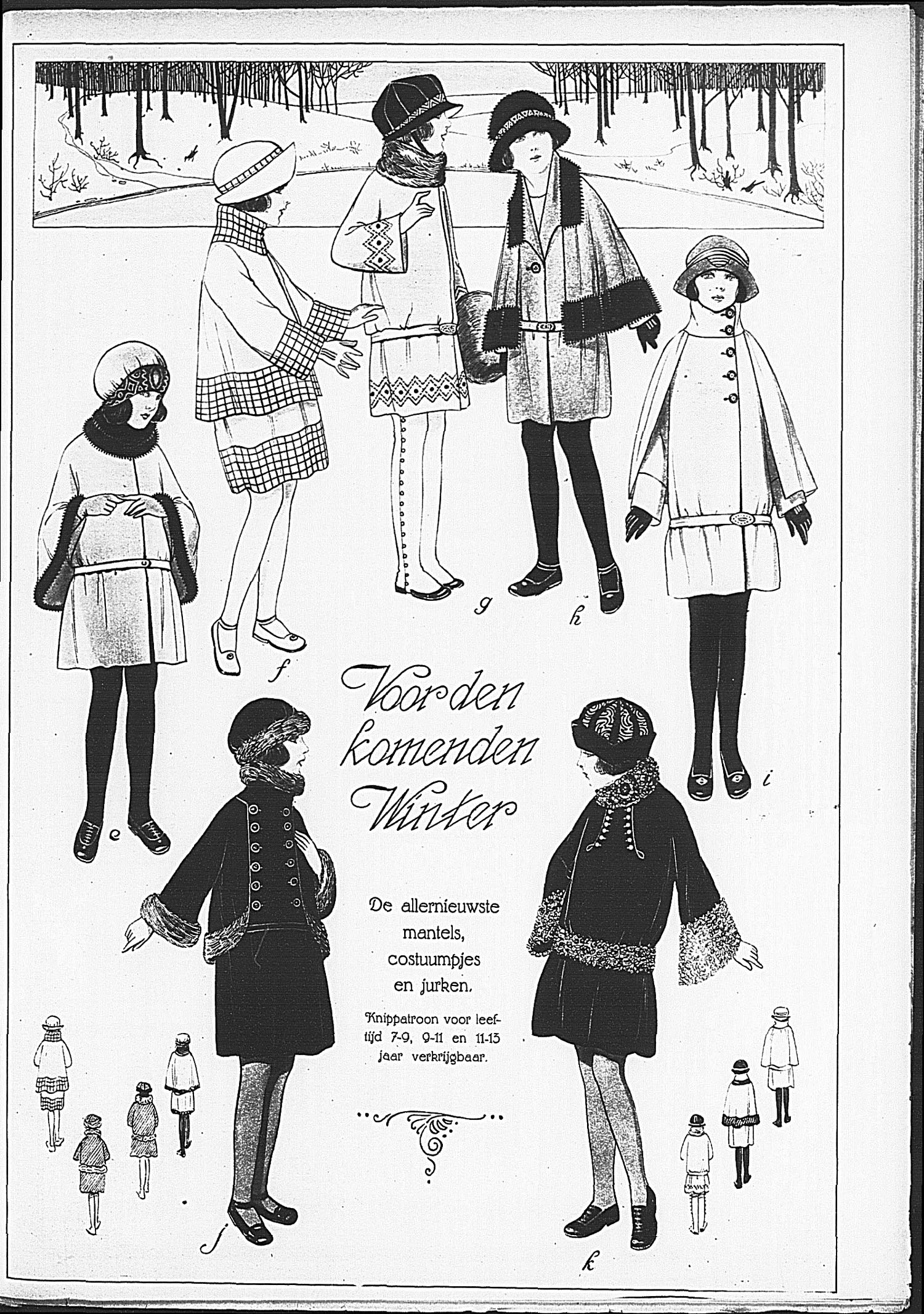
Winter fashion for girls, 1923.

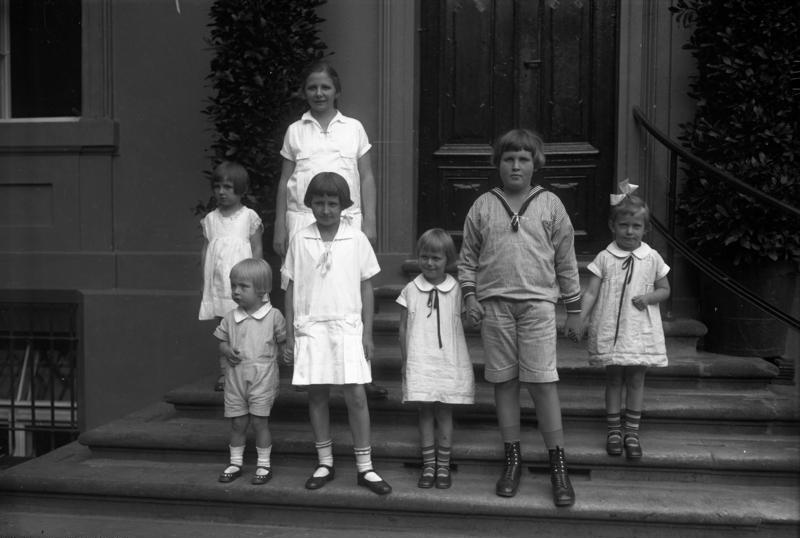
Children's fashion, Germany, 1925.

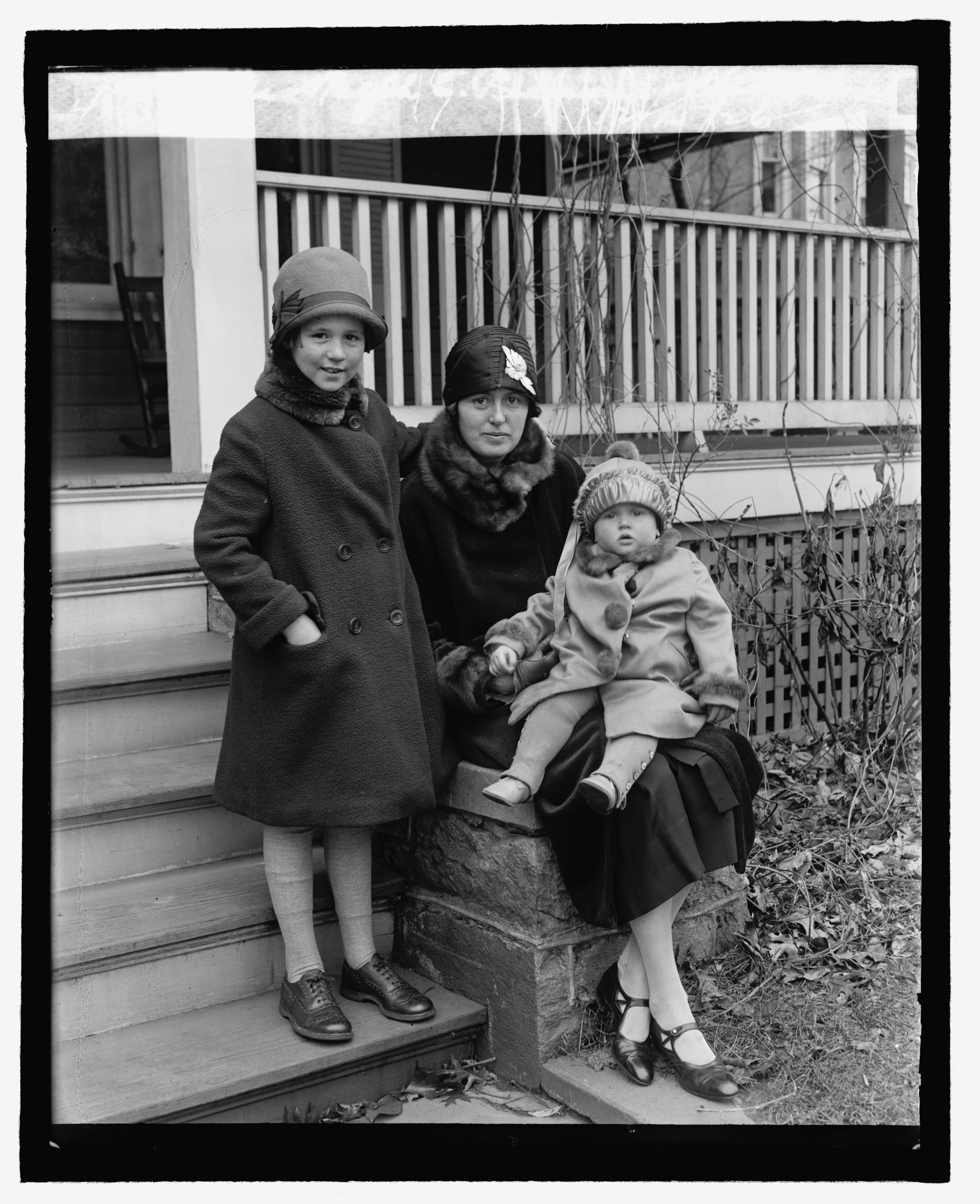
Mrs. Ralph E. Pearsons & children, 1926

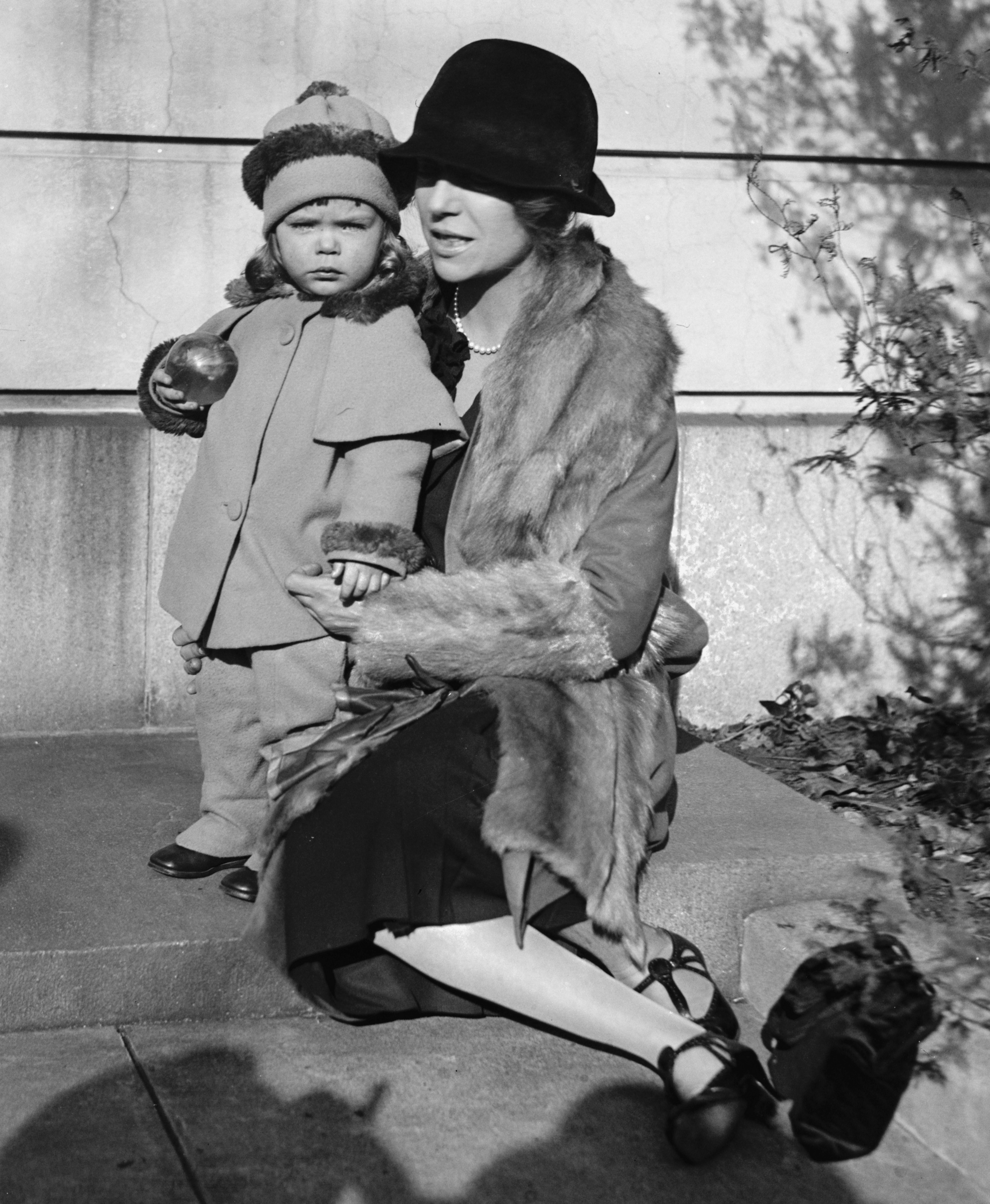
Two-year-old Paulina with her mother, Alice Roosevelt Longworth, wearing a winter costume of coat and trousers, 1927.

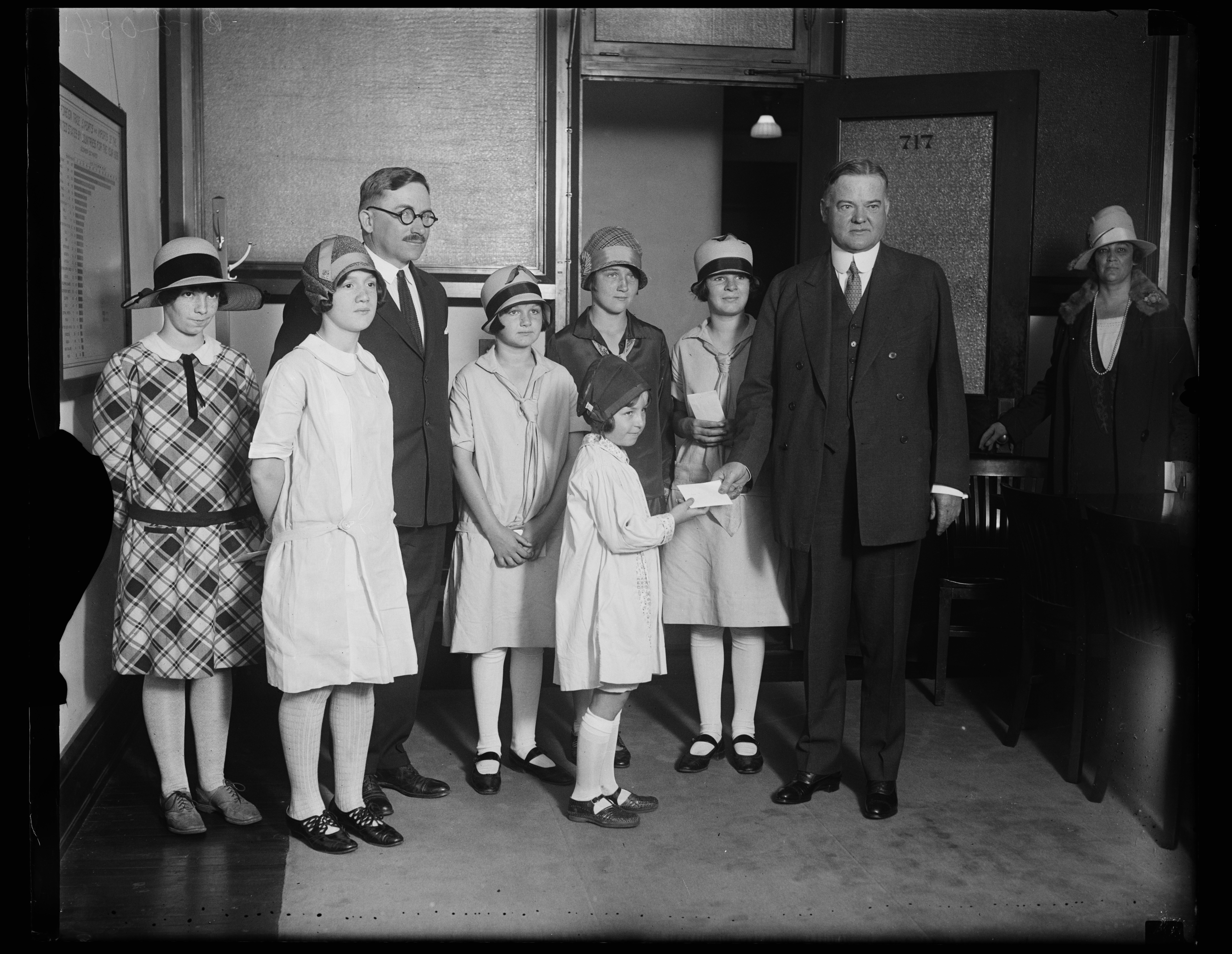
Herbert Hoover with a group of children, 1927.

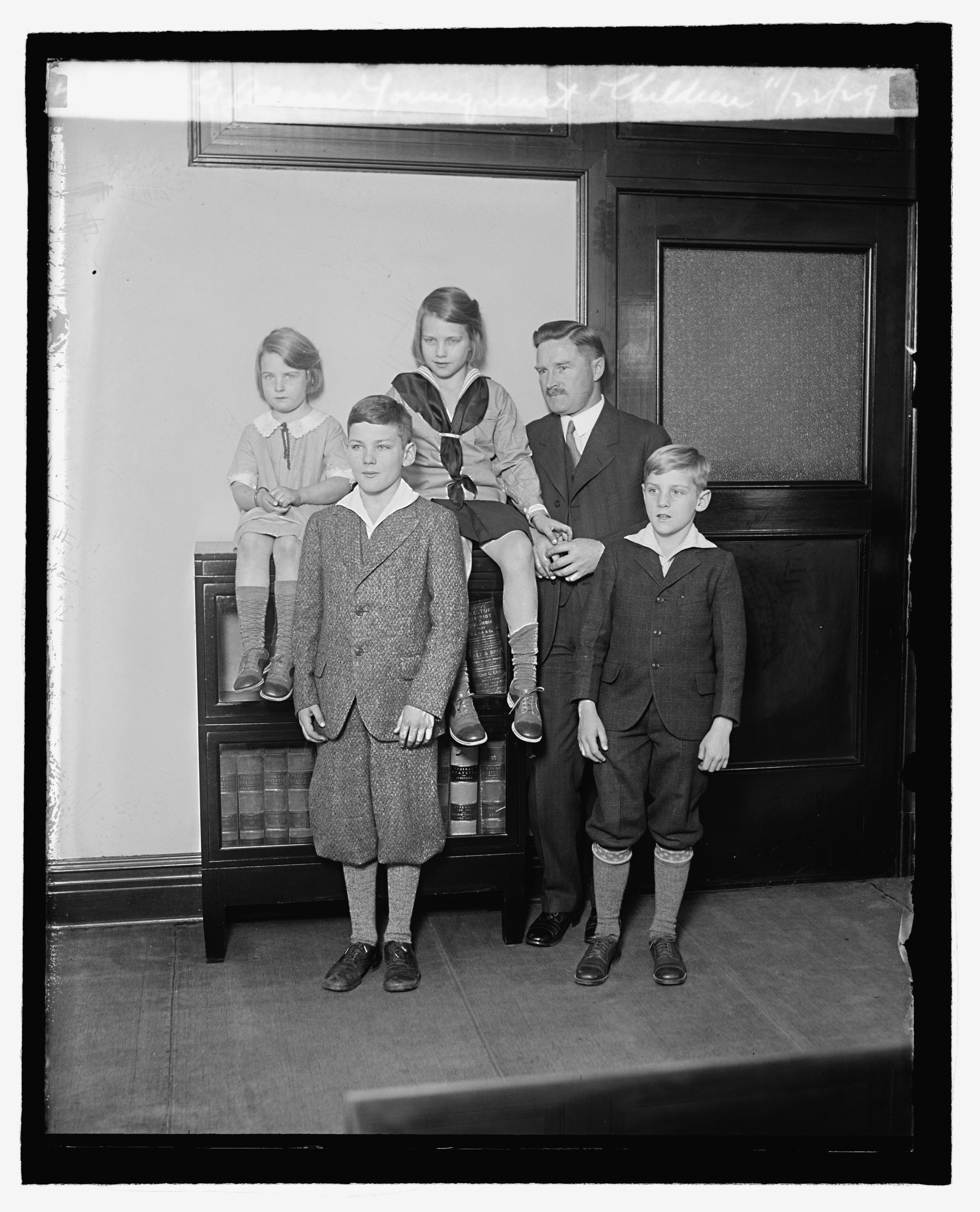
Aaron Younquist & children, 1929.

== See also ==
- Cosmetics in the 1920s
- Roaring Twenties
- Flapper
- Interwar period
