= List of jewellery designers =

This is a list of notable jewelry designers.

== Argentina ==
- Ricardo Basta

== Australia ==
- Joanna Angelett
- Wilfrid Nelson Isaac
- Alice Elsie Reeve

== Austria ==
- Ingo Appelt
- Elena Kriegner
- Nettie Rosenstein
- Daniel Swarovski

== Belgium ==
- Lodewyk van Bercken
- Larisa Popova

== Brazil ==
- Fernando Jorge
- Kim Poor

== Canada ==
- Lois Betteridge
- H.V. Dalling
- Dean Davidson
- Charles Edenshaw
- David Neel
- Bill Reid
- Tobi Wong

== Czech Republic ==
- George Brooks
- Julie Wimmer

== Denmark ==
- Joachim Matthias Wendt

== Dominican Republic ==
- Jenny Polanco

== Egypt ==
- Daria Gamsaragan

== Estonia ==
- Kadri Mälk

== France ==
- Louis Aucoc
- Dominique Aurientis
- Guy Bedarida
- Suzanne Belperron
- Marcel Boucher
- Frédéric Boucheron
- Jacques-Théodule Cartier
- Pierre C. Cartier
- Dolly Cohen
- Jean-Baptiste Fossin
- James de Givenchy
- Robert Goossens
- Jade Jagger
- René Sim Lacaze
- René Lalique
- Jean Mayeur
- Robert Mazlo
- Jean-Valentin Morel
- Alexandra Nereïev
- Marie-Etienne Nitot
- Sebastien Parfait
- Paloma Picasso
- Jacques von Polier
- Alexandre Reza
- Fred Samuel
- Jean Schlumberger
- Stéphanie Sivrière
- Lea Stein
- Pierre Sterlé
- Philippe Van Dievoet dit Vandive

== Germany ==
- Jakob Bengel
- Gregor Clemens
- Carl Dau
- Joachim Grallert
- Heidrun Mohr-Mayer
- Anni Schaad
- Julius Ludwig Schomburgk
- Georg Friedrich Strass
- Ferdinand Anton Nicolaus Teutenberg
- Lilian von Trapp

== Greece ==
- Ilias Lalaounis
- Elena Votsi
- Sotirios Voulgaris

== Guyana ==
- Vannetta Seecharran

== Hong Kong ==
- Wallace Chan

== Hungary ==
- Zoltan David

== India ==
- Tarun Jain
- Waris Ahluwalia
- Farah Khan Ali
- Khailshanker Durlabhji
- Shantidas Jhaveri
- Neelam Kothari
- Nayna Mehta
- Sudha Pennathur
- Suhani Pittie
- Ambaji Shinde
- Mahima Verma

== Ireland ==
- Slim Barrett
- Melissa Curry

== Israel ==
- Dorrit Moussaieff

== Italy ==
- Loris Abate
- Akelo (Andrea Cagnetti)
- Carolina Bucci
- Gianni Bulgari
- Fortunato Pio Castellani
- Benvenuto Cellini
- Ugo Correani
- Enrico and Damiano Damiani
- Carlo Giuliano
- Andrew Grima
- Allessandro Masnago
- Roberto Faraone Mennella
- Giovanni Sebastiano Meyandi
- Elsa Peretti
- Luciana Pignatelli
- Giò Pomodoro
- Ippolita Rostagno
- Fulco di Verdura

== Japan ==
- Yasuki Hiramatsu
- Kimiko Kasai
- Akiko Kawarai
- Mikimoto Kōkichi

== Lebanon ==
- Dina Azar
- Selim Mouzannar
- Tabbah

== Netherlands ==
- Gijs Bakker
- Bert Nienhuis
- Ted Noten
- Marly van der Velden

== Norway ==
- Celine Engelstad

== Pakistan ==
- Tapu Javeri

== Romania ==
- Daniel Stoenescu

== Russia ==
- Dmitriy Bellman
- Carl Edvard Bolin
- Erté
- Gustav Fabergé
- Peter Carl Fabergé
- Joseph Marchak

== Spain ==
- Salvador Dalí

== South Africa ==
- Anna Rosholt Jewellery

== Sweden ==
- Efva Attling
- Arne Blomberg
- Carolina Gynning
- Vivianna Torun Bülow-Hübe
- Sigrid Torsk

== Switzerland ==
- Kurt Aepli
- Gilbert Albert
- Jean Jahnsson

== Taiwan ==
- Cindy Chao
- Onch Movement

== Ukraine ==
- Natasha Zinko

== United Kingdom ==
- Joanna Angelett
- Kali Arulpragasam
- Bec Astley Clarke
- Solange Azagury-Partridge
- Tom Binns
- Judy Blame
- Robert Brandon
- John Brogden
- Jocelyn Burton
- John Paul Cooper
- David Stewart Dawson
- Nelson Dawson
- Monty Don
- John Donald
- Samuel Henry Drew
- Annoushka Ducas
- Theo Fabergé
- Theo Fennell
- John Francillon
- Elizabeth Gage
- Arthur Gaskin
- Georgie Gaskin
- Sabine Getty
- Ola Gorie
- Laurence Graff
- Andrew Grima
- John Hardy
- Sophie Harley
- George Heriot
- William Herrick
- Philippa Holland
- Charles Horner
- George Edward Hunt
- Annabel Jones
- Elizabeth Kirkeby
- Shaun Leane
- Andrew Logan
- Joseph Mayer
- Kiki McDonough
- Flora McLean
- Edith Emily Morris
- Ella Naper
- Louise Nippierd
- Ari Norman
- Dorrie Nossiter
- Henry Raeburn
- Angharad Rees
- Tony Swatton
- James Tassie
- William Tassie
- Monica Vinader
- David Watkins
- James Cromar Watt
- Stephen Webster
- Harriet Kelsall

== United States ==
- James Avery
- Webb C. Ball
- Bill Barrett
- BillyBoy*
- Gail Bird
- Alexis Bittar
- Steven Brody
- Richard Shaw Brown
- Daniel Brush
- Ben Nighthorse Campbell
- Alexander Calder
- Eric Daman
- Henry Dunay
- Robert Ebendorf
- Marie el-Khoury
- Elliot Eliantte
- Mignon Faget
- Paulding Farnham
- Jennifer Fisher
- Paul Flato
- Susan Foster
- Sophia Forero
- Jane A. Gordon
- William Snelling Hadaway
- William Claude Harper
- Miriam Haskell
- George W. Headley
- Joan Hornig
- Michael Horse
- Holly Hosterman
- Mary Lee Hu
- Richard W. Hughes
- Yazzie Johnson
- Fred Kabotie
- Michael Kabotie
- Jessica Kagan Cushman
- Alfred Karram
- Martin Katz
- Linda Fry Kenzle
- Omar Kiam
- Alexis Kirk
- Florence Koehler
- Carolyn Kriegman
- Kenneth Jay Lane
- Stanley Lechtzin
- Charles Loloma
- Pamela Love
- Mary Lyon
- Peter Macchiarini
- Linda MacNeil
- Tim McCreight
- Jennifer Meyer
- Alexandra Mor
- Robert Lee Morris
- Celia Newman
- Clifton Nicholson
- Kevin O'Dwyer
- Philip Press
- Nettie Rosenstein
- Christopher Ross
- Marty Ruza
- Cynthia Sakai
- Atsidi Sani
- Marjorie Schick
- Lorraine Schwartz
- Kendra Scott
- Celia Sebiri
- Emory Sekaquaptewa
- Coreen Simpson
- Tommy Singer
- Albion Smith
- Bill Smith
- Mimi So
- Hans Stern
- Tarina Tarantino
- Maria Tash
- Rachelle Thiewes
- Charles Lewis Tiffany
- Louis Comfort Tiffany
- Justin Tranter
- Betony Vernon
- Lella Vignelli
- Diana Vincent
- Cathy Waterman
- Stephanie Wells
- Harry Winston
- Sherry Wolf
- Alex Woo
- David Yurman
- Marie Zimmermann

== Vietnam ==
- Rosalina Lydster

== See also ==
- List of fashion designers
- List of footwear designers

== Global Directories ==
TheCaratCut
