= Corina Larpin =

Romanian-born jewelry designer

Corina Mihaila Larpin
- Born: Romania
- Occupation: Designer
- Employer: Stéfère Jewelry

Corina Mihaila Larpin is a Romanian-born jewelry designer and the founder of Stéfère Jewelry.

== Career ==
Larpin was born in Romania and later moved to Hong Kong, where she established her career in jewelry design. She joined Stéfère Jewelry in 2009, initially working under the brand's original founders in Paris. In 2014, she acquired full ownership. Her designs are known for their combination of rebellious elements, drawing inspiration from various cultural motifs and her personal aesthetic.

Her creations are characterized by bold, rock-inspired motifs, including snakes, stars, and skulls. Larpin collaborated with designer Thom Browne to create a pair of 44-carat ruby nipple covers worn by Cardi B at the Met Gala.

Larpin is a committee member of the Women of Hope charity in Hong Kong, which advocates for social justice and empowerment for underprivileged communities.
