= Fernando Jorge (designer) =

Brazilian jewellery designer (born 1979)

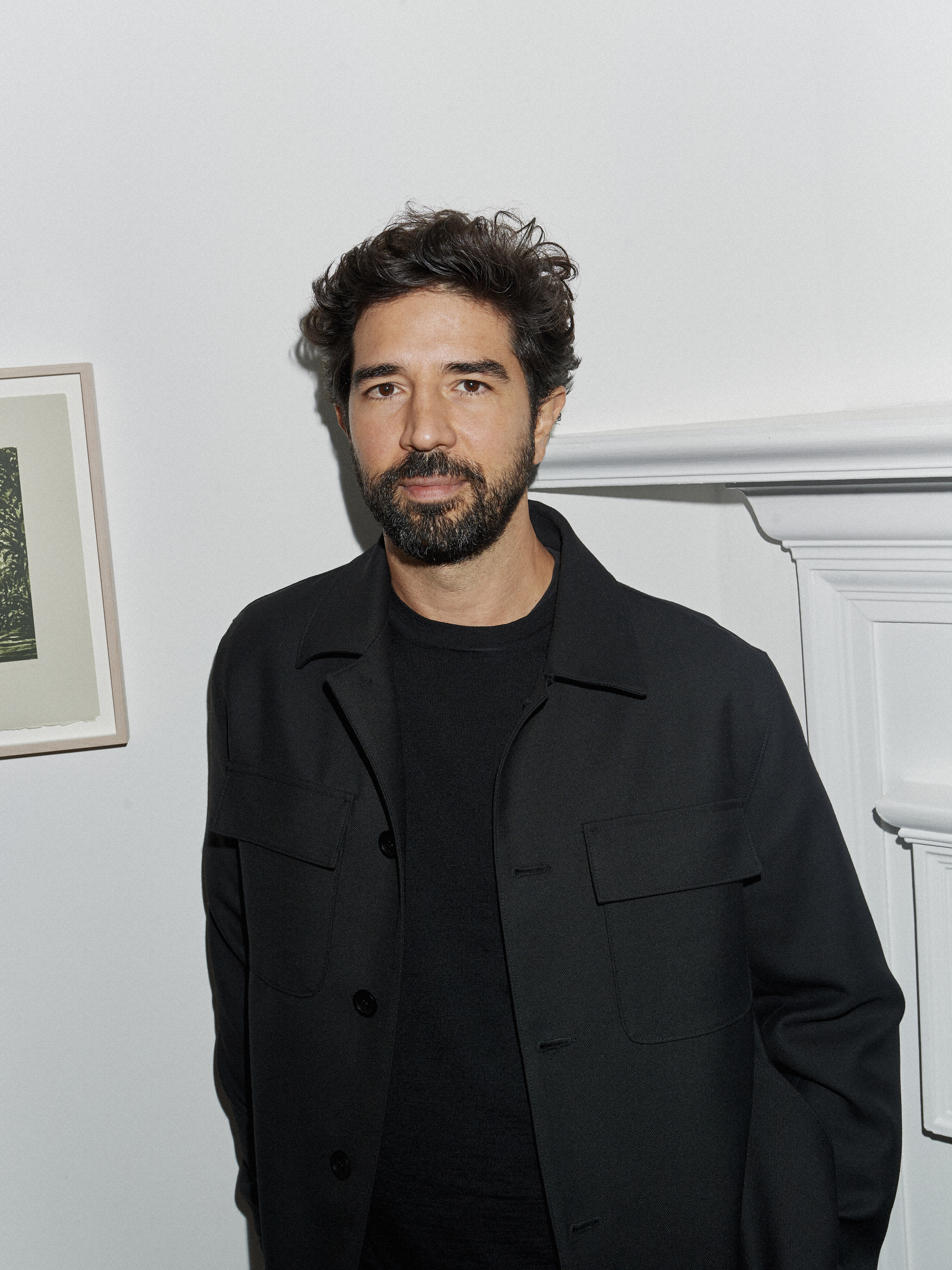
- Photograph by Jon Gorrigan
- Born: Fernando Pires Jorge; August 24, 1979 (age 47); Campinas, Brazil
- Education: Central Saint Martins
- Occupation: Jewellery designer
- Label: Fernando Jorge (2010–present)
- Website: fernandojorge.co.uk

Fernando Pires Jorge (born August 24, 1979) is a Brazilian jewellery designer. He launched his eponymous fine jewellery brand in 2010, after completing an MA in design at Central Saint Martins (2008–2010).

== Biography ==
Growing up in Campinas, Brazil, he was passionate about drawing from an early age. While studying design in São Paulo, Jorge made a living designing for a large manufacturer and later for the Brazilian jewellery designer Carla Amorim. In 2008, he moved to London to complete his MA in design at Central Saint Martins. His first collection was presented in June 2010 as a result of completing his MA.

In 2012, Stephen Webster selected Jorge as one of ten fine jewellery designers to showcase their AW12 collection at the British Fashion Council Rock Vault initiative. Similarly in 2014, Jorge was sponsored by Rock Vault to showcase his SS15 collection in the Designer Showrooms during the 2014 London Fashion Week. As part of the sponsorship, Jorge made his first showcase at the Couture Show, in Las Vegas, winning the Couture Design award for best coloured gems for under $20,000 category.

In 2014 and 2015, Jorge was nominated for Best Emerging Accessories Designer by the British Fashion Council. In 2017, he won the Couture Design Award for Diamonds above $20,000. In 2018, he won the Town and Country Jewelry Award for Best Diamonds and the Couture Design Award for The Editors Choice. In 2019, he won the Jewelers of America GEM Award for Best Jewelry Designer.

Jorge, now predominantly based in the United Kingdom, has private showrooms in Mayfair, London, Chelsea, New York City and Jardims, Sao Paulo. His designs are manufactured in Brazil, Portugal and Italy.

Annabel Davidson, who writes about luxury jewellery for The Telegraph, has described Jorge's work as having "a visual identity that is hard to describe – but it’s sensual, bold, colourful, and very contemporary."

Jorge's jewellery has been worn by celebrities including Fernanda Torres, Michelle Obama, Viola Davis, Saoirse Ronan, Diane Kruger, Emily Blunt, and Naomi Watts.
