= Stephanie Wells =

American jewelry designer

Stephanie Wells (born May 1, 1968) is an American jewelry designer who co-founded Double Happiness Jewelry.

== Biography ==
Born in Los Angeles in 1968, Wells grew up in Canada and southern California before moving to San Francisco to study marketing and religion. Her studies in religion would later influence her jewelry designs by combining Eastern mysticism with Western design.

== Double Happiness ==
Wells started the California-based company Double Happiness Jewelry with her sister, Alisa Rottenberg, in her San Diego home in 2001. Wells named the company after the Chinese concept of unity and new beginnings. Wells' original vision was to create jewelry similar to that of the Bedouin people of Egypt, with whom she had stayed while visiting the Sinai Desert. Shortly after its creation, the company won the 2001 Gen Art Fresh Faces in Fashion competition. The line has appeared in Allure, Bridal Guide, Harpers Bazaar, W, and Vogue.

In 2010, Wells published The Earring Style Book, a how-to guide about Double Happiness Jewelry's designs. Double Happiness began collaborating with Jewelry Television in 2011.

Today Double Happienes has more than 400 stores worldwide.

== Bibliography ==
Stephanie A. Wells, The Earring Style Book, 2010.
