= Philippa Holland =

British artist

- Occupation: Jewellery designer

Philippa Holland, UK born jewellery designer, started designing in 2003 after completing ‘The History of Jewellery’ at Sotheby's and gemology at the Gem-A. In 2006, Philippa established herself as a jewellery designer and created Philippa Holland Fine Jewellery, based in Notting Hill, London. In November 2008, the Financial Times credited Philippa for being one of the leading young British jewellery designers. In 2010, Philippa's jewellery was featured in "Fashion for Jewels:100 Years of Styles and Icons," a book written by UK Vogue's Jewellery Editor, Carol Woolton.

She draws her inspirations from the worlds of nature and history, using organic objects such as seed pods, leaves, insects and skeletons, that are collected largely from where she lives, in the Savernake Forest. She uses a Renaissance ceramicist technique, "casting from life," where the pieces are electro-formed and cast in gold and silver, thereby transforming these raw objects into exact replicas of wearable art. All the jewellery is produced in small workshops in England, further giving the brand an English identity.

== Philanthropy ==
Philippa has participated in a series of charity fundraisers. In 2010, Philippa rode 100 miles of southwest England on sidesaddle and raised funds for the breast cancer charity, Too Many Women. On 30 June 2011 she will be participating in the George Frewer Celebration Amateur Charity Race at Newbury, organised by renowned trainer Charles Egerton, and will be collecting funds in order to support the charity, Center Point.
