= Sudha Pennathur =

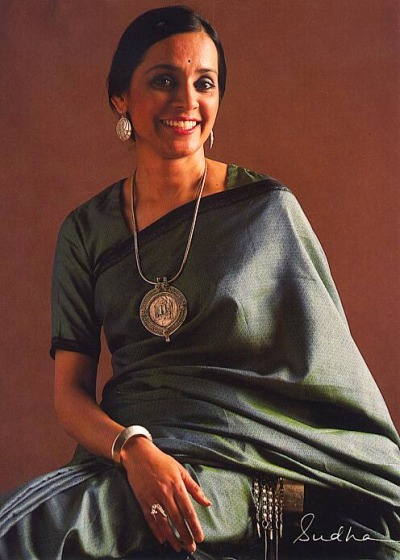
- Born: Chennai, India
- Occupations: jewelry designer and entrepreneur.

Sudha Pennathur (born in Chennai, India) is an Indian jewelry, scarf, holiday ornaments, & art objects designer and entrepreneur. Pennathur designs and brings Indian inspired jewellery and crafts to the American Market. Daughter of Dr. Krish Pennathur, noted Indian author of productivity and business management books.

== Education ==
Pennathur studied commerce at Mumbai's Sydenham College, Pace University, Business Administration at Columbia University, MBA at University of Washington

== Business approach ==
Pennathur has sought to keep the art of Indian Craftsmanship alive by employing local artisans to create jewelry, clothing and decorator items. Pennathur wanted to match American consumers' tastes with the skills of India's deep reserves of artisan labor. (This is in contrast to factory produced goods.)

== Career ==
Pennathur started her own business, Sudha Pennathur LP, in 1985. Pennathur was formerly employed by Levi Strauss and Carter Hawley Hale Stores. She also has worked at Carson Pirie and Scott & The Bon Marche.

== Achievements ==
Worked with Indian Government to reduce red tape involved in exportation from India.

== Awards ==
- 2014 – Girls Inc. – Strong, Smart & Bold Leader of Distinction
- 2013 – Bread & Roses Labor of Love Award (In recognition of 12 years of extraordinary generosity and devotion to the Bread & Roses mission of Hope & Healing Through Live Music)
- 2011 - 100 Black Men of the Bay Area, Inc. - WPO Women of Color Honoree
- 2 October 1992 – Pennathur was presented the Entrepreneur Award from the Asian Pacific Women's Network at their 11th Anniversary Woman Warriors Awards Dinner, Which was recognized by a Certificate of Commendation by the City of Los Angeles

== Non-Profit Boards ==
- Berkeley Rep - Member, Board of Trustees (2016–Present)
- Goodwill San Francisco/San Mateo/Marin - Board of Directors (2020–2024)
- Aquarium of the Bay - Advisor/Ambassador (2018)
- Board Member & supporter (2009–2013) of Angel Island Conservancy whose focus is to facilitate the preservation, restoration and interpretation of historical and natural resources on Angel Island.
- Sudha is a long time supporter and former Board President of The Redwoods in Mill Valley. The Redwoods is a non-profit active home for seniors in Mill Valley, CA.
- Pennathur has served on the board of Bread and Roses for 6 years, two of those as co-chair. (Bread & Roses is dedicated to uplifting the human spirit by providing free, live, quality shows to people who live in institutions or are otherwise isolated from society.)
- Donor to the Sarvodaya International Trust The Sarvodaya International Trust aims identify and support those Gandhian institutions and voluntary organizations which are of importance in the context of the objects and doing' laudable and commendable work in the moral, non-violence, peace, communal and racial harmony fields and in the Social, Cultural and Environmental spheres, on Gandhian lines.

== Philanthropic Work ==
SUDHA'S TREASURES ANNUAL BENEFIT SALE

Since 2004, Sudha has opened a once-a-year holiday store (Sudha's Treasures) that benefits local charities. 100% of the profits are donated to various charities that she supports. Over the past 20 years Sudha has donated over $1,200,000 to the Bay Area non-profits to benefit our local communities. Past beneficiaries include:

2024

- Berkeley Rep
- Marin Symphony
- Vivalon

2023

- Marin Symphony

2022

- Goodwill SF Bay Area
- Aquarium of the Bay

2021

- meemli

2020

- Goodwill San Francisco, San Mateo, Marin
- Parks California

2019:

- Whistlestop
- Marin Villages
- Marin Symphony

2018:

- Berkeley Rep
- Whistlestop
- North Bay Children's Center
- Marin Villages

2017:

- Equal Rights Advocates
- Whistlestop
- North Bay Children's Center

Previous Years

- Bread & Roses
- The Redwoods
- Angel Island Conservancy
- Gateway Public Schools
- The Friendship Club

She is a founding member of the Kilpennathur School building in Pennathur, India.
