= Alfred Karram =

- Born: November 29, 1932
- Died: December 17, 2017 (aged 85)
- Occupation(s): Artist and Jewelry designer
- Known for: Jewelry

Alfred Karram was a United States-based artist and jewelry designer.

== History ==
Based in New York City, formerly with a jewelry store and studio at 57th Street and Madison Avenue, Alfred Karram designed jewelry for over 40 years. After selling his Manhattan store, he moved to South Florida and started an architecture and design business based in Boca Raton named Alfred Karram II. He developed turnkey residences in the area, including a $14M condo in Boca Raton, Florida. He was joined by his wife Emilia and son Alfred Karram Jr. in that company designing and building multimillion-dollar residences throughout South Florida.

== Museum Acquisitions ==
In 2007, the Museum of Fine Arts in Boston, MA USA acquired an 18K Cubic bracelet for their permanent collection.

In 2008, in advance of their grand re-opening, the Museum of Arts and Design, NY, NY, USA acquired his "Cleopatra" necklace from Alfred Karram's 'Organic' collection and placed it in their permanent collection.

== Family ==
Alfred's children have each become artists or designers. His oldest, Michelle Karram Murray, is an artist and currently volunteering as a Docent for the North Carolina Museum of Art. Alfred Karram Jr. has his own architectural and design company in Miami, Florida. His daughter Alexandra Karram-Feurring has an interior design business in Boca Raton, Florida. His son David Karram has a website and 3D company named Tek Visual, also in Boca Raton, Florida.
