= Melissa Curry =

Irish jewelry designer

- Born: 31 March 1970 (age 56); Sligo, Ireland
- Occupation: Jewellery designer
- Labels: Melissa Curry; Success by M

Melissa Curry (born 31 March 1970) is an Irish jewelry designer. She is known for her bold colourful designs and blending of diverse influences.

== Early life and family ==
Melissa was born in County Sligo in the West of Ireland.

== Fashion debut ==
After studying commercial design and advertising in Paris, Melissa spent several years travelling and exploring the ethnic designs of Asia and Africa before returning to Paris to launch her career in fashion. Her first collection was launched at L'eclaireur and her first show was at Premiere Classe Paris. As the only Irish jewelry designer to show at Paris Fashion Week 1999, Melissa caught the fashion world's attention and her designs were featured in Liberty of London's Millenium Press Campaign as the Liberty Cutting Edge Jewellery Designer.

== Career ==
Melissa Curry has produced designs for Swarovski, Toni & Guy, Liberty of London, Absolut, Moet et Chandon, Le Bon Marche, Galeries Lafayettes, and Phillipe Stark @ Bon. and was featured in the DIAS Trilogy. Her collection Smarties, symbolising hope and endurance, was presented to Michelle Obama during the 2011 Presidential Visit to Ireland

In 2011, her work was featured at Ireland's National Craft Gallery in the 21st Century icons exhibit. She was also featured in the 2010 Crafts Council Ireland catalog.
