= Jessica Kagan Cushman =

American jewelry designer (born 1958)

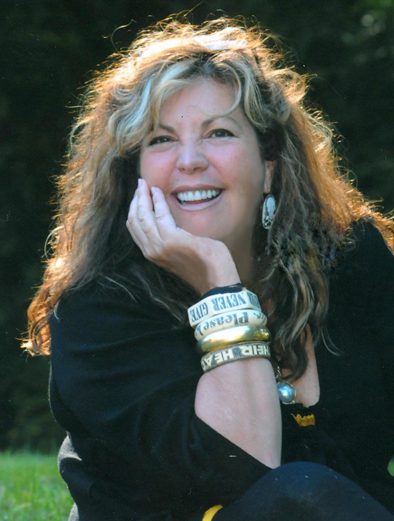
- Cushman wearing her bracelets in 2008.
- Born: Jessica Kagan; April 7, 1958 (age 68); New York, NY
- Occupation: Jewelry designer
- Spouse: Bill Cushman (m. 1980)
- Children: 1
- Website: http://www.jessicacushman.com

Jessica Kagan Cushman is an independent jewelry and accessories designer.

== Early life ==
Cushman was born on April 7, 1958, in New York City. Her father, Vladimir Kagan, was a German-born furniture designer considered an early pioneer of modern American design. Her mother, Erica Wilson, was an innovative British embroidery designer who was known as “the Julia Child of needlework.” Cushman graduated from Smith College with a BA in Art History. She resides in Redding, Connecticut, with her husband Bill Cushman.

== Career ==
=== Jewelry and accessories ===
After learning scrimshaw from her father and embroidery from her mother, Cushman went into business in 2004, starting out with hand-engraved bracelets. She has since expanded her line to include necklaces, rings, earrings and other accessories. Her items have been featured on the cover of Cosmopolitan, and in numerous other magazines, such as Vogue (UK), Elle, People and InStyle.

=== Inscribed bracelets ===
In 2007, Cushman began hand-engraving fossilized woolly mammoth tusk bangles with whimsical pop culture sayings. Barneys New York was the first store to offer the line. Cushman then began manufacturing a more affordable resin reproduction version. Two years later, Cushman introduced a line of tote bags inscribed with similar phrases, as well as cuffs featuring zodiac constellations in crystals on black resin.

== Honors ==
In 2012, Cushman was named one of three rising star finalists by Fashion Group International in the category of fine jewelry.
