= Sigrid Torsk =

Sigrid Mathilda Torsk (9 February 1841 – 4 February 1924) was a Swedish jewellery designer. She was the owner and managing director of the jewelry firm J. E. Torsk between 1860 and 1924.

== Life ==
Sigrid Torsk was the daughter of the jewellery designer and goldsmith Jakob Engelberth Torsk, who was the jeweller of the Swedish Royal Court, and the sister of the engineer Olof Torsk.

When her father died in 1860, Sigrid Torsk took over her father's business company as co-owner with her older sister Anna Torsk (she became sole owner and director in the mid-1880s).

In 1893, Sigrid Torsk was described as one of the two most successful female jewellers in Sweden alongside Esther Ponsbach Meyer.

She died unmarried 1924.

The works of Sigrid Torsk is represented at the Statens historiska museer (Historical Museums of the State), such as the Hallwyl Museum.
