= Philip Press =

American jewelry designer

- Born: Philip Press; 1965; New York, United States
- Other names: Press
- Occupation: jewelry designer
- Known for: modern designs and classic traditional,
- Website: https://philippress.com/

Philip Press is an American jewelry designer, Press creates Art Deco vintage-style platinum pieces, as well as modern designs and classic traditional collections, using diamonds and gemstones.

== Early life ==
Press was born in New York.

== Career ==
In 1991 Press founded Philip Press, Inc. on Beverly Boulevard in West Hollywood, California, and later moved his studio and workshop to the Sunset Strip in 1999. The jeweler and his designs have been featured on the Red carpet at the Academy Awards and in fashion and bridal media.

In 1998 he featured one of the world’s largest selections of platinum rings. His work is worn by Nicolette Sheridan, Tori Spelling, Jennifer Hewitt, Kym Johnson, Demi Lovato and Mariah Carey.

== Philanthropy ==
Press has aided the Foundations of the Los Angeles Police Department and Los Angeles Fire Department. Press began serving on the board of the Los Angeles Fire Department Foundation in 2011.
