= Akiko Kawarai =

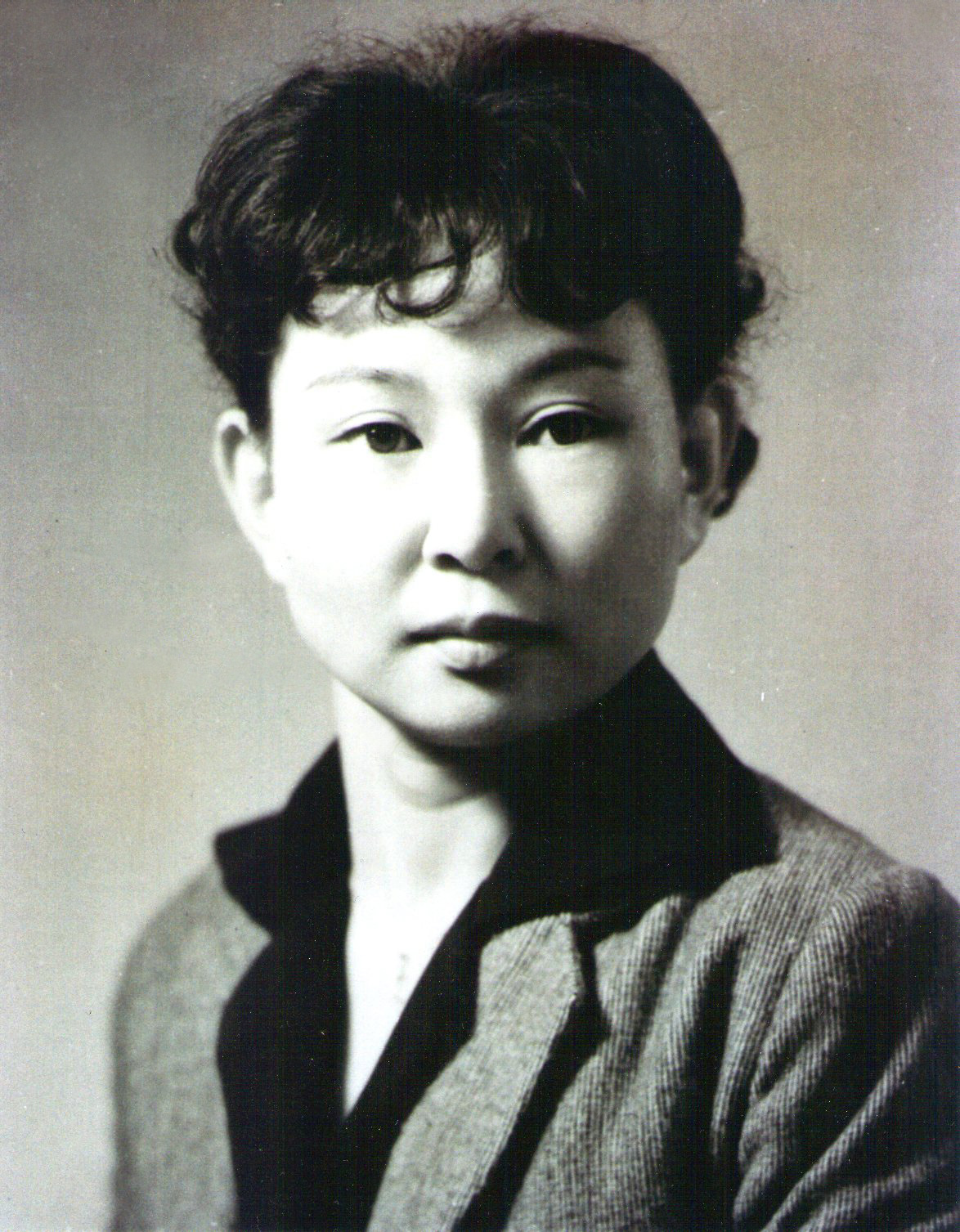
- Born: 23 October 1929 (age 96); Utsunomiya, Japan
- Known for: Painting, drawing, jewellery design, music composer
- Movement: Primordial Universal Unity

Akiko Kawarai (born 23 October 1929 in Utsunomiya, Japan) is a Japanese artist, jewellery designer, and composer who resides in Argentina. She founded the Primordial Universal Unity movement.

== Childhood ==
Born on 23 October 1929 in a traditional Japanese family of samurai origin, Akiko is the only daughter of the marriage between Terutoshi Kawarai and his first wife Kiyo, who died shortly after Akiko's birth.

Akiko didn't enjoy good health as a child, her marked weakness along with the pessimistic medical diagnosis regarding her life expectancy being a constant cause of concern for her parents. In the long periods of convalescence to which she was exposed, Akiko found escape through art, breaking free from the shackles of her own personal suffering and from time itself.

Her drawings attracted the attention of adults, because despite her young age, her work went beyond that which would be expected of a child. In 1938, for reasons connected with her father's employment, the family left Japan and settled in Changchun, the capital of Manchukuo, China. The sudden environmental change had severe consequences for Akiko health, succumbing as she did to a serious fever shortly after taking up residence there. During the course of her illness Akiko had a vision of her fragile body disintegrating into diminutive spherical pieces that after separating from each other were reunited again in a golden, spherical litmus, from which fragments of her former lives were projected.

The Second World War ended in 1945 when Akiko was 15 years old. In September of the following year her family left Manchukuo for the port city of Sasebo, located in the prefecture of Nagasaki, from where they traveled by train to the city of her birth, Utsunomiya, in the province of Tochigi. In the post-war chaos Akiko's father was unable to find work and the family, without a home, was shuffled from one relative's house to the next until a tragic accident left Akiko's father blind. As a result of this incident Chidori, Terutoshi's second wife and stepmother to Akiko, abandoned the family. To confront this new reality Akiko decided not to proceed with a university art course and obtained work at the Tochigi Province Association of Agriculture and Economy to secure the funds to maintain and take care of her father's needs. This brought Akiko to the crossroads between the overwhelming reality that had afflicted her and her vocation as artist. She decided not to abandon art altogether but rather entered into a period of self-instruction. After her duties Akiko found moments to share her transcendental experiences through art with a select group of artists with whom she joined in spiritual retreats in the mountains near the city of Utsunomiya, forming there the movement Primordial Universal Unity. Another of Akiko's loves was literature. She frequented exclusive literary circles where she met notable Japanese contemporary writers.

== Artistic Activity ==
=== Painting ===
In 1964 she realized her first individual exhibition of oil paintings in the Lunami Gallery, Ginza, Tokyo. In the same year she entered the 8th Shell Arts Competition, in which she was awarded a prize. Also in that year she was selected to be part of the 3rd International Young Artist Exhibition Europe-Japan. Her entry on the art market scene attracted a great deal of attention and recognition by critics and gallery owners. After 1964 Akiko presented her work in numerous exhibitions and international competitions among which the following are noteworthy:

- 1964 Participation in the Salon of Independent Artists in the Metropolitan Art Museum of Tokyo.
- 1966 Competition of Contemporary Art organized by Newspaper Mainichi Shimbun. Her work was selected and Akiko Kawarai was named artist of the year.
- 1967 The 4th International Young Artists USA-Japan. As well that year she realized an Exhibition at the Muramatsu Gallery, Ginza, Tokyo, Japan.
- 1968 Obtained the Award of Revelation in the competition of the Japanese Engraving Association and entered that association as a junior member.
- 1969 Her work was chosen for the exhibition organized by CWAJ, Tokyo, Japan.
- 1973 Participated in the Exhibition of Japanese Engravers, Pasadena, USA. In that year she became a full member of the Association of Japanese Engraving.
- 1978 Exhibition Gran Prix Japanese Engravings. Also exhibited at the Shirota Gallery, Ginza, Tokyo, Japan.
- 1988 Exhibition in the Toka Gallery, Shizuoka, Japan. Also exhibited at the Shirota Gallery, Ginza, Tokyo, Japan.
- 1990 Participated in the Centenary Exhibition of Carlos Gardel, National Congress, Buenos Aires, Argentina.
- 1991 Homage to Charlo Exhibition, Cultural and Informative Center of the Japanese Embassy.
- 1992 Exhibition to The music of Charlo, Cultural Center Yukio Mishima, Buenos Aires, Argentina. That same year she conducted the exhibition, The Spirit of Japan, Museum of Visual Arts, Quilmes, Province of Buenos Aires, Argentina as well as exhibiting in the Manuel Belgrano Municipal Salon of Fine Arts and the Eduardo Sivori Museum of Fine Arts, Buenos Aires, Argentina.

1994 Participated in the Chandon Salon of Drawing and Engraving, Buenos Aires, Argentina.

Throughout her career as an artist Akiko has used the artistic disciplines of engraving, collage, oil and drawing as mediums of expression. Esthetically, her works have been from the beginning far removed from any external influence or trend, following as she always has a commitment based upon her own spiritual experience.

Her works are found in select private collections and public institutions such as the National Museum of Osaka, Japan; National Museum of Engraving, Argentina; Cultural Center Yukio Mishima, Argentina; National Academy of Tango, Argentina, among others.

=== Jewellery ===
Jewellery was a field of experimentation for Akiko Kawarai as jewels themselves combine the tri-dimensionality of sculpture with the functionality of applied arts. In 1979 she entered the Academy of Yoyogi Jewellery and began jewellery design. Her characteristic compositions of spherical abstract forms were materialized in silver, gold, platinum, pearls and select natural gems.

In 1981 she took part in jewellery design competitions such as the 9th International Pearl Design contest, organized by the firm Mikimoto and in the 14th Diamond Design contest, organized by the firm De Beers in Japan. She received awards in both contests. Also in 1983 she competed in the Platinum Design competition, in which her design received an award and she was nominated artist of the year.

Akiko still continues today to design jewellery in limited quantities.

=== Music ===
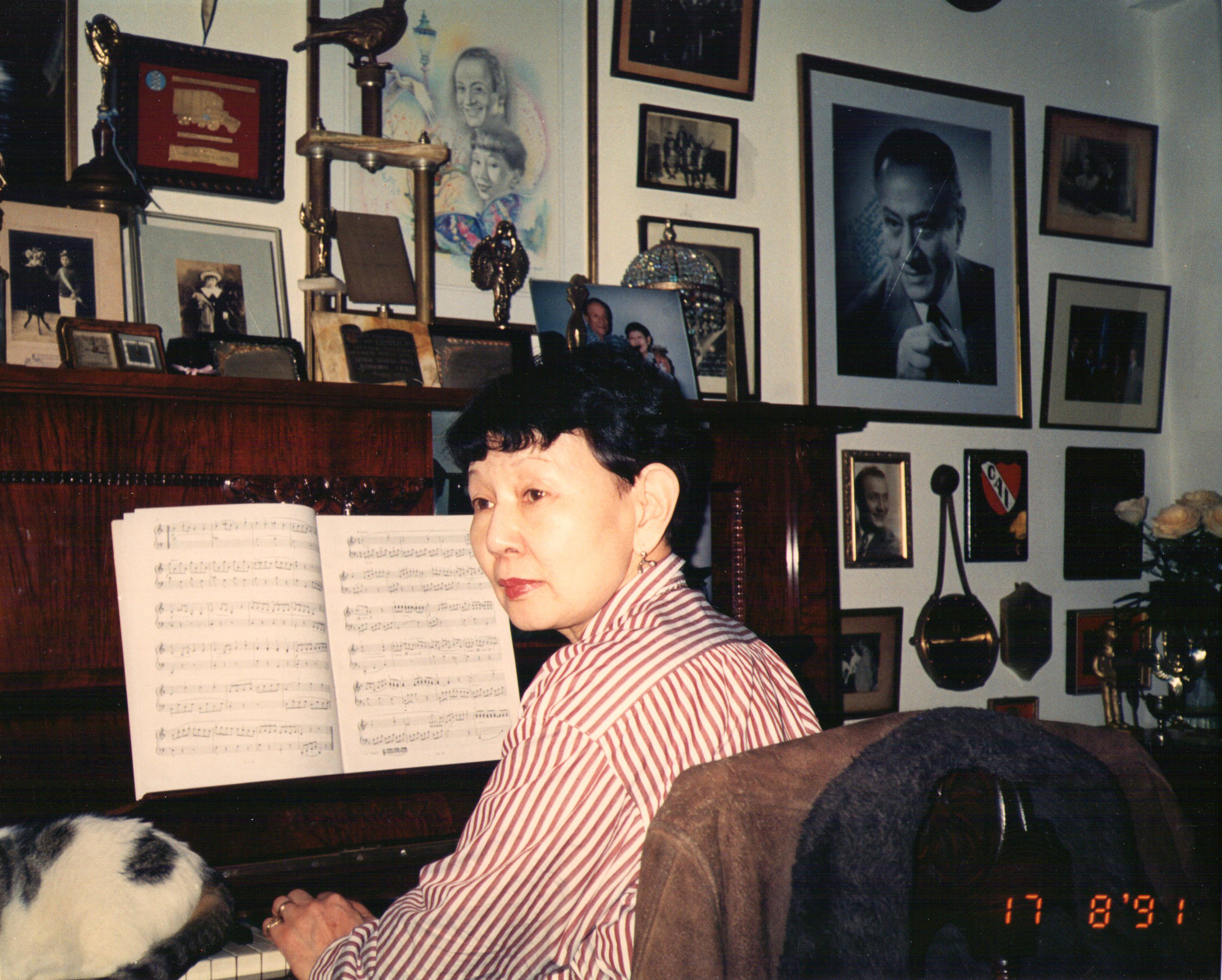
Akiko Kawarai at the piano

At the age of 13, when she attended school in Manchukuo she listened for the first time to some records that her father had of Argentinean tango. Unaware of the meaning of the lyrics sung by Carlos Gardel or Libertad Lamarque, she committed the lyrics to memory. Then she was only a young girl and would have had no idea that one day she would live in Argentina, the cradle of tango. Some time after discovering tango and the music of the singer Charlo around 1970 Akiko became interested in music as a form of expression and following an inner call she decided to move to Argentina where she began music classes with important tango masters like:

- Virgilio Exposito.

From this experience Akiko made two albums, the first "Look of the Marionette" in 1998 and "Buenos Aires Fantasy" 2001. Among the musical compositions of tango created by Akiko Kawarai are:

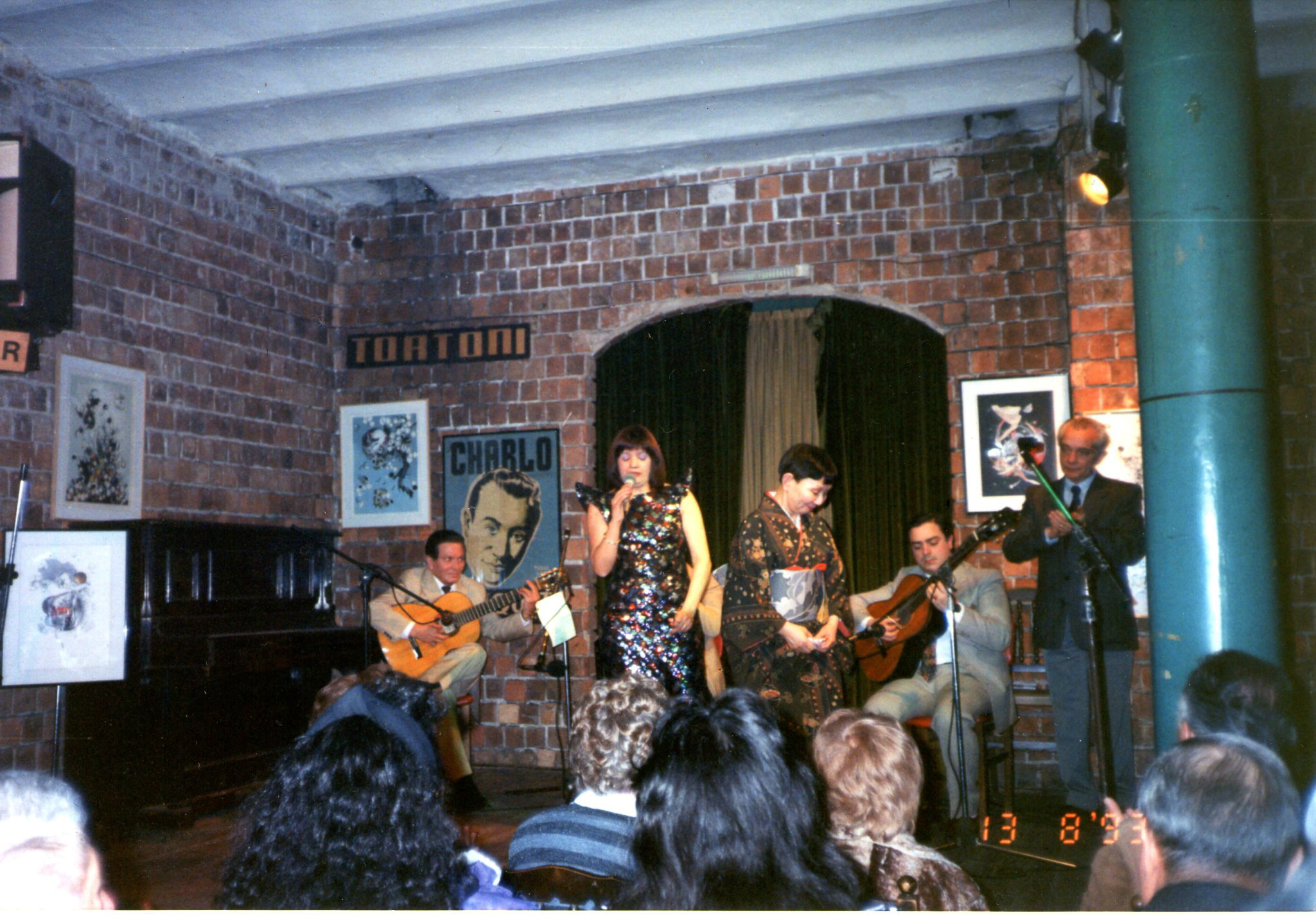
At Tortoni's Cafe

- A plena luz (1998)
- A sola con mi piano (1998)
- Atardecer azul (2000)
- Brisa de otoño (2000)
- Camino azul (2000)
- Canción crepúsculo (2000)
- Canta grillo (2000)
- Con tu amor (1998)
- Cuentos de colibrí (2000)
- Danza de viento (2000)
- En tiempo de tu amor (1998)
- Espejo perdido (1998)
- Hasta la amanecer (1998)
- Viento brillante (1998)
- La boquilla (1998)
- Mar lejano (2000)
- Mar y sueño (1998)
- Rocío Matinal (2000)
- Rosa de verano (2000)
- Sin final (1998)
- Vida mágica (1998)
- Viola violeta (2000)
- Venturanza (2000)

== Sentimental life ==
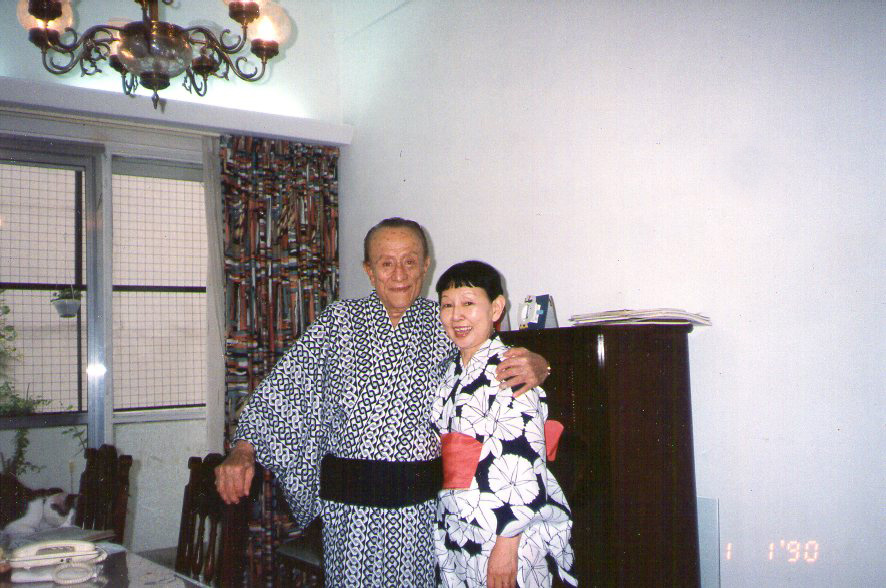
Akiko Kawarai and Charlo

Akiko Kawarai has devoted her life to art, perceiving it to be a form of communication with the divine. Such a concept of life has enabled her to live a rich sentimental life, because according to her own words she has been able to find love in other past lives. Charlo: While she has found other loves in her life, her only true love was Carlos Pérez de la Riestra.

Something mysterious and inexplicable happened when she heard his voice for the first time. Akiko felt the imperious need to meet the Argentine tango singer personally. She wrote to him first and finally through a friend who returned from Argentina to Japan Charlo sent her a cassette in which he said, "come to Argentina or I will go there". Akiko followed her feelings to Argentina and ended up living with Charlo until his death on 30 October 1990.
