= Allessandro Masnago =

Italian sculptor

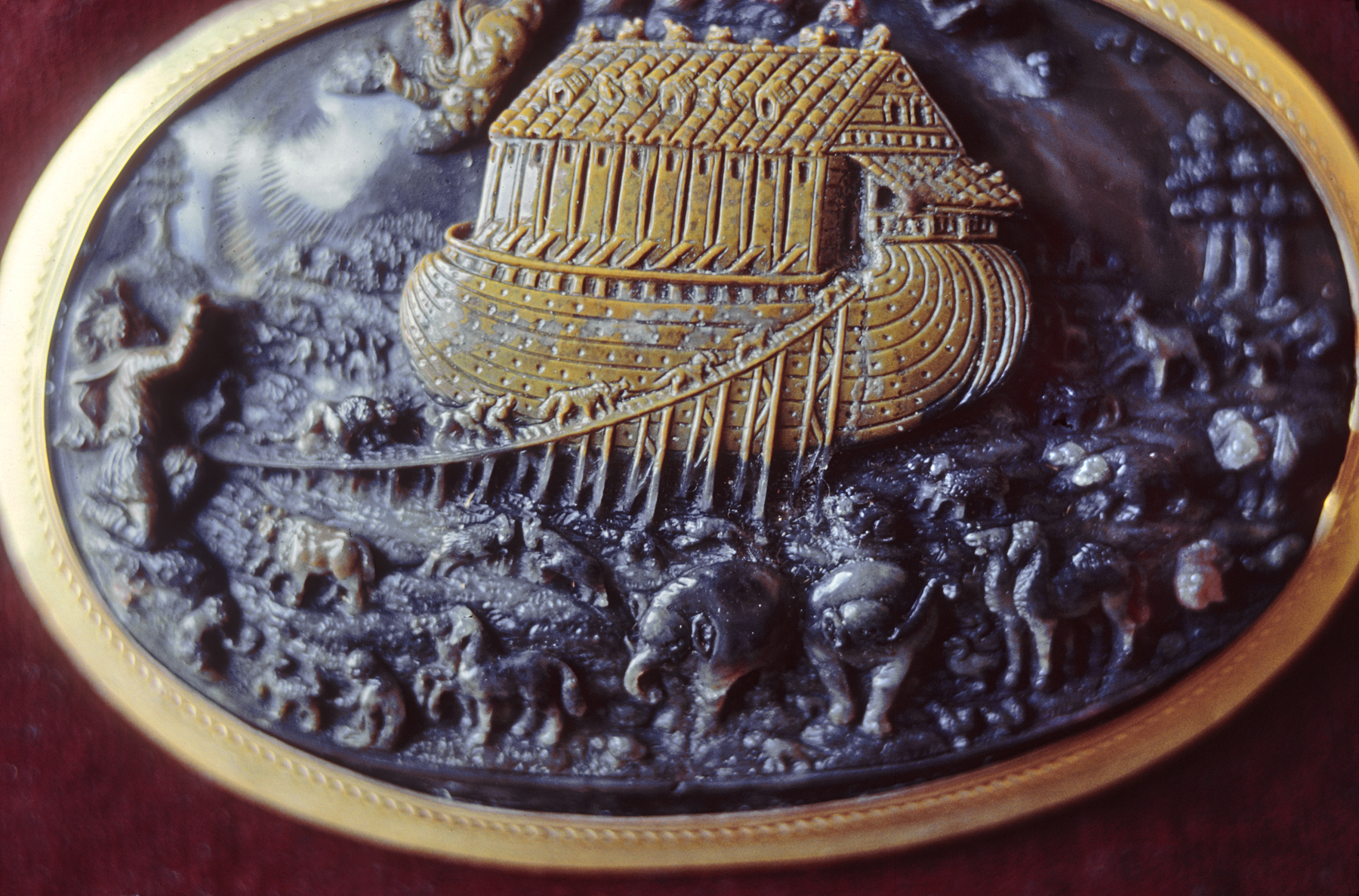
Cameo with Noah's Ark, circa 1600. Walters Art Museum

Allessandro Masnago (Active ca. 1560 – died 1620) was an Italian jewelry maker, sculptor and miniaturist. Masnago has been described by art historians as a "great virtuoso." He was the son of Italian engraver Giovanni Antonio.

== Notable collections ==
- Pendant with Cameo showing Orpheus and the Animals, Art Institute of Chicago
- Sleeping Shepherdess in a Moonlit Landscape, Metropolitan Museum of Art
