= Linda Fry Kenzle =

American author, jewelry designer (born 1960)

- Born: May 1960 (age 65–66)
- Occupations: Author, jewelry designer, painter and garden designer

Linda Fry Kenzle (born May 1960) is an American author, jewelry designer, painter and garden designer.

== Biography ==
Kenzle grew up in Wisconsin, surrounded by nature. In addition to studying art at college she developed a wide variety of interests, including her self-taught passion for gardening and beadwork. She has designed jewelry valued at several thousand dollars in price.

Kenzle has done two major studies. The first explored the psychological and social functions of dress. The second focused on the history of beadwork from prehistoric times to today.

She is the author of ten books: five on art, four on gardening, and a multimedia anthology.

Kenzle is a painter of Abstract and Surrealistic Paintings.

== Gardening ==
She has done landscape design for the Kappas Estate, Casa del Sueños, Boardmans, etc. She specializes in layering shrubs and perennials with occasional accents of annuals to create the all-season garden.

She is an expert in propagation and has taught and cloned botanicals. She is especially known for herbs.

== Publications ==
- Art Dolls, 1985, Geneva Street Press
- Herbs, 1990, Third Coast Book Company
- Scented Geraniums, 1991, Eastlake Unlimited
- Vines For America, 1992, Eastlake Unlimited
- Embellishments: Adding Glamor to Garments, 1993, Chilton Book Company ISBN 0-8019-8478-5
- Dazzle: Creating Artistic Jewelry & Distinctive Accessories, 1995, Chilton Book Company ISBN 0-8019-8638-9
- The Irresistible Bead, 1996, Hyperion
- Gathering: Using Simple Materials Gleaned From the Garden & Nature, 1998, KPBooks ISBN 0-87341-557-4
- Pages: Innovative Book Making Techniques, 1998, Krause Publications ISBN 0-87341-547-7
- Hit or Miss, 34 Autobiographical Paintings in hand-tipped plates, 2008, ICON Productions
- The Primal Abstracts, 50 hand-tipped plates, 2008, ICON Productions
- The Primal Abstract, 51+ hand-tipped color plates, 2009
- Eat Me, 2009
- Real/ Surreal, 2014
- Hit or Miss, 33+ hand-tipped color plates, 2014
- Greetings from the Florida Keys, 2014
- ARMOR: Breastplates & Masks, 2014
- Exquisite Decay, 2014
- Collage & Assemblage, 2014
- Love Letters to My Dying Husband, 2014
