= Rosalina Lydster =

Vietnamese American jewelry designer (born 1962)

Rosalina Tran Lydster
- Born: September 16, 1962 (age 64); Vietnam
- Occupation: Jewelry designer

Rosalina Tran Lydster (born September 16, 1962) is a Vietnamese American jewelry designer. She was co-designer of the crown for the Miss Universe 2008 competition.

== Early life and education ==
Rosalina Lydster was born in Vietnam to Hai Vo, a jeweler for Vietnam’s first lady and other Saigon socialites. Her father Charles TRAN was a trained architect. The family owned a jewelry business that catered to high-end clients. They later moved to The United States in the 1970s and continued the jewelry business in San Francisco. Lydster studied business at San Francisco State University and continued her studies at the Fashion Institute of Design & Merchandising.

== Career ==
After graduation, Lydster began her career as an investment banker. She had been designing wedding bands and other pieces for friends until deciding to found her company of Jewelry by Rosalina in 2001. In 2005, she was named as one of the official jewelers for the 2006 Academy Awards. In 2008, Lydster was selected as the co-designer for the Miss Universe Crown 2008 competition. and as a preliminary judge for the Miss Universe 2008 and 2009 competition.

In 2019, she became a co-executive producer for House of Ho, a "docusoap" on HBO Max. House of Ho is the first Vietnamese reality show on a major network. Lydster is the CEO of Rosalina Entertainment and Northwest 360.

Rosalina was nominated by apl.de.ap for the Asian American Pacific Islander History in 2021: The GMA Inspiration list.
