= Elizabeth Gage =

British jewellery designer and goldsmith

- Occupations: Jewellery designer and Goldsmith
- Website: http://www.elizabeth-gage.com

Elizabeth Gage MBE (born 1937) is a British jewellery designer and goldsmith, regarded as a leading figure in modern British jewellery design. She founded the London-based heritage jewellery house Elizabeth Gage in 1964, which is known for handcrafted, one-of-a-kind and limited-edition pieces created in 18 and 22 carat gold.

Her work is characterised by bold, sculptural forms and a strong emphasis on craftsmanship, drawing inspiration from historical periods including ancient civilisations, the Renaissance, and classical antiquity. Jewellery by Elizabeth Gage is collected internationally by private clients and collectors, and is held in museum collections including the Victoria and Albert Museum in London.

The Elizabeth Gage brand has been particularly associated with bespoke jewellery and individually commissioned pieces, including engagement rings often characterised by distinctive and non-traditional designs, as well as heirloom pieces intended for long-term ownership. Her life and work have been the subject of published monographs, including Elizabeth Gage: A Life in Jewellery (2026), which documents her contribution to contemporary jewellery design.

Elizabeth Gage has been described by The New York Times as a designer whose work reflects a distinctive, enduring approach to jewellery-making rooted in craftsmanship and individuality.

== Early life and education ==
Elizabeth Gage was born in 1937 into a creative family in the United Kingdom. She studied at the Chelsea School of Art and the Central School of Art and Design in London, where she developed an interest in goldsmithing and historical ornament.

Her early exposure to museum collections and antique artefacts informed a design approach rooted in craftsmanship and historical reference.

== Career ==
Elizabeth Gage established her jewellery business in London in 1964, focusing on individually designed pieces that combined traditional goldsmithing techniques with a distinctive aesthetic.

She gained early recognition within the jewellery industry when her Agincourt ring design received a De Beers Diamonds International Award, where it was described as an “engineering masterpiece”. Over subsequent decades, jewellery by Elizabeth Gage became associated with high-quality, handcrafted pieces produced in limited quantities, often incorporating rare or unusual gemstones.

The company has evolved into an independent heritage jewellery house, maintaining its emphasis on artisanal production and design integrity.

== Design philosophy and craftsmanship ==
The work of Elizabeth Gage is defined by a commitment to craftsmanship and the use of high-carat gold, typically 18 and 22 carat. Her jewellery is often described as sculptural, with a focus on weight, texture, and form.

Drawing on influences from ancient Egypt, classical antiquity, and the Renaissance, Elizabeth Gage’s designs frequently incorporate enamel, carved gemstones, antique coins, and baroque pearls. Each piece is created with an emphasis on durability and longevity, reflecting an approach in which jewellery is intended to be worn over generations.

In coverage of her work, The New York Times noted that her jewellery stands apart for its independence from seasonal fashion trends, instead reflecting a consistent and recognisable design language developed over decades.

The house of Elizabeth Gage is associated with the tradition of British independent jewellery design, where individual authorship and artisanal production are central.

== Bespoke jewellery and commissions ==
A significant aspect of the Elizabeth Gage brand is its bespoke jewellery service, through which individual commissions are created for private clients. These include engagement rings, ceremonial pieces, and the redesign of inherited jewellery.

Each commission is developed in consultation with the client, often incorporating personal, historical, or symbolic elements. These commissions often include engagement rings designed as unique, statement pieces that differ from conventional styles.

The bespoke process is typically consultative and tailored to the individual client, with an emphasis on accessibility and flexibility rather than standardised pricing structures or fixed commissioning thresholds. This approach reflects the house’s focus on encouraging personal expression and long-term relationships with clients.

Bespoke pieces created by Elizabeth Gage are frequently intended as modern heirlooms, designed for durability and long-term ownership.

== London atelier and showroom ==
Jewellery by Elizabeth Gage is designed and produced in London, where the company operates from a showroom in Belgravia. The showroom functions as both a retail space and a private consultation environment, where clients can view collections and commission bespoke pieces.

The Belgravia location places Elizabeth Gage within one of London’s established luxury districts, and the showroom is visited by both domestic and international clients seeking handcrafted jewellery and individually designed jewellery.

Elizabeth Gage has maintained a longstanding presence within London’s jewellery sector, including earlier premises in Mayfair.

== Collections and notable works ==
Over the course of her career, Elizabeth Gage has created a wide range of rings, necklaces, brooches, and earrings, often characterised by bold use of colour and form.

Notable works include:

- The Agincourt ring, recipient of a De Beers Diamonds International Award
- The Templar Ring, recognised for its unique design
- The Charlemagne Ring, recognised for its intricate craftsmanship and exquisite gemstones
- The Renaissance Ring, recognised for its adaptable design, enabling the incorporation of birthstones as personal or familial markers
- Pieces incorporating antique coins and historical motifs

Jewellery by Elizabeth Gage is particularly associated with bold, statement rings, including designs that have influenced non-traditional engagement ring styles.

== Exhibitions and recognition ==
The work of Elizabeth Gage has been exhibited internationally, including exhibitions in the United Kingdom and the United States. A retrospective exhibition in New York highlighted her contribution to contemporary jewellery design.

Jewellery by Elizabeth Gage is included in the collection of the Victoria and Albert Museum in London. In 2017, Elizabeth Gage was appointed Member of the Order of the British Empire (MBE) for services to jewellery design and the arts.

== Publications ==
Elizabeth Gage is the author of The Unconventional Gage (2003), a book documenting her work and design philosophy.

In 2026, a monograph titled Elizabeth Gage: A Life in Jewellery, written by William Grant and published by ACC Art Books, was released. The book traces her career over more than six decades and presents a comprehensive overview of jewellery by Elizabeth Gage, featuring detailed photography of handcrafted pieces alongside biographical material.

The publication documents her approach to combining historical influences with contemporary design, and includes examples ranging from sculptural gold rings to pieces incorporating enamel, carved gemstones, and antique elements.

== Legacy and influence ==
Elizabeth Gage is considered an influential figure in contemporary British jewellery, particularly within the field of independent, designer-led production.

Her work, and the continued presence of the Elizabeth Gage house, have been associated with a sustained emphasis on craftsmanship, high-carat gold, and historically informed design in an era increasingly shaped by mass production. She is regarded as part of a tradition of jewellers whose work occupies a position between fine art and wearable design.

Jewellery by Elizabeth Gage is often described as collectible and enduring, with many pieces acquired as long-term investments or passed down across generations.

Her career and body of work have been further documented in Elizabeth Gage: A Life in Jewellery (2026), which situates her within the context of British jewellery design and highlights her contribution to individually crafted, collectible jewellery.
