= Sébastien Parfait =

French jewellery designer (born 20th century)

Sébastien Parfait (born 20th century) is a jewellery designer from Paris.

== Early life and education ==
Parfait began to imagine and design jewelry very early on, a vocation that has never left him, and that became a reality when, five years after he first started, he entered the École du Louvre (HBJO). He graduated first in his class in 1995, with a gold medal to boot. In order to further explore his creativity and acquire professional know-how, he went on to attend the Lyon School of Jewelry, where he received a degree in fine art.

== Career ==
After a first experience working for the jewellery company Cartier, he worked in several renowned houses, all the while working on his own creations, for which he quickly built up a clientele.

Parfait recently created his own company, and he now spends all of his time designing and making original pieces.

His pleasure in transforming the organic matter is based on a personal aesthetic inclination toward mobility and clean lines. The piece must have some mobility in itself, but also in relation to other elements. Soldering traces disappear, while playfulness prevails. Pursuing clean lines leads to a minimalism that banishes heaviness and excess.

== See also ==
- List of jewellery designers
- List of French artists
