= Cathy Waterman =

American jewelry designer

Cathy Waterman is a California based jewelry designer and a member of the Council of Fashion Designers of America. She designs “ethereal, feminine, lyrical” jewelry using recycled metals and fair trade stones, and her work is characterized by its use of 22k gold and platinum.

== History ==
Waterman spent her childhood in California. Her first jewelry design sketches she designed for herself. In 1990 Waterman launched her brand. Since 1997 Waterman is in a partnership with Ylang 23, which debuted many of Waterman´s collections like “Love of My Life” Album of Rings in 2009 and “Wild Love” Collection in 2010.

Waterman is married to pop lyricist Eddie Kislinger and they have three children together.

== Designs ==
On May 3, 2014 Michelle Obama wore Cathy Waterman earrings to the White House Correspondents Dinner. On January 21, 2013 Mrs. Obama wore a Cathy Waterman necklace and earrings to the Presidential Inauguration which are now in the Smithsonian Museum. On May 24, 2011 Mrs. Obama attended a state dinner at Buckingham Palace wearing Cathy Waterman earrings.

Singer Taylor Swift performed at the 2014 Grammy Awards wearing Cathy Waterman earrings.

Cathy Waterman designed the jewelry featured in the film Snow White and the Huntsman including the recycled gold vine earrings with black sapphires and diamonds worn by Charlize Theron and the gold ring worn by Kristen Stewart.

Julia Louis-Dreyfus wore Cathy Waterman jewelry on the TV show VEEP.

Matthew McConaughey proposed to Camila Alves with a Cathy Waterman engagement ring.

Stephen Moyer proposed to his True Blood costar Anna Paquin with a Cathy Waterman ring.

Academy Award winner Julia Roberts wearing Cathy Waterman.

Photographer Sally Mann wore Cathy Waterman jewelry on the cover of New York Times Magazine.

On 2021, Cathy Waterman designed Taylor Swift’s merch ring for the re-release of Red (Taylor's Version). The ring can be seen on the album's artwork.

== Interviews ==
- Los Angeles Times “Cathy Waterman wants to imbue her jewelry with magic"
- Food & Wine Magazine “Cathy Waterman’s Precious Metals at the Table”
- Food & Wine Magazine “Cathy Waterman’s Incredible Multitasking Kitchen”
- Le Figaro “Pleins feux sur six créateurs”
- Vogue Paris “L’exposition Cathy Waterman chez White Bird”
- L’Express “Les bijoux feeriques de Cathy Waterman dans Blanche-Neige et le chasseur avec Charlize Theron”
- Vogue Paris “Cathy Waterman designs jewelry for Snow White and The Huntsman"
- People Magazine “Golden Girl”

== Red carpet ==
Academy Award winner Gwyneth Paltrow wore a Cathy Waterman bracelet when she accepted her Oscar for Best Actress in 1999.

Academy Award winner Nicole Kidman wears Cathy Waterman.

Golden Globe winner Michelle Pfeiffer wore Cathy Waterman earrings to the 2012 London premiere of Dark Shadows.

Tony Award-winning actress Viola Davis wore Cathy Waterman jewelry to the 2012 SAG Awards.

Academy Award winner Jennifer Lawrence wore a Cathy Waterman necklace to the 2011 BAFTA Awards.

SAG award winner Dianna Agron wore a Cathy Waterman necklace to the 2011 Golden Globes.

Golden Globe award winner Kerri Russell wore Cathy Waterman to the 2010 Emmy Awards.

Emmy Award winner Laura Linney wore Cathy Waterman to the 2008 Academy Awards and the 2009 Golden Globe Awards.

Two time Academy Award winner Sally Field wore her Cathy Waterman earrings to the 2007 Emmy Awards.
