= Arne Blomberg =

Swedish jewelry designer

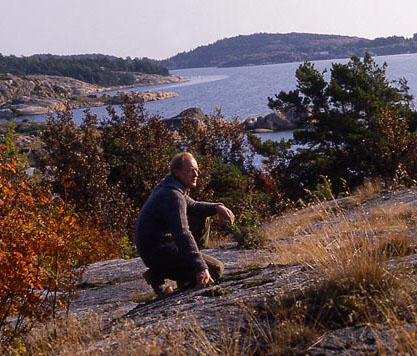
- Arne Blomberg sitting on cliffs
- Born: Arne Bror Östen Blomberg; March 17, 1930; Gothenburg, Sweden
- Died: December 24, 2006 (aged 76); Spain
- Occupation(s): Designer, jeweller, goldsmith

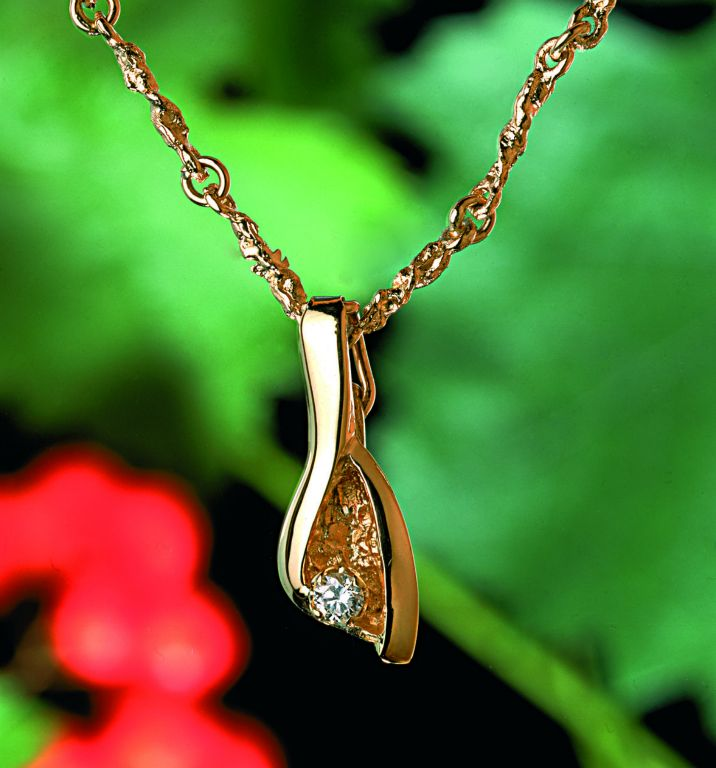
Necklace – Nature of Sweden

Arne Bror Östen Blomberg (1930–2006) was a Swedish designer and jeweller.

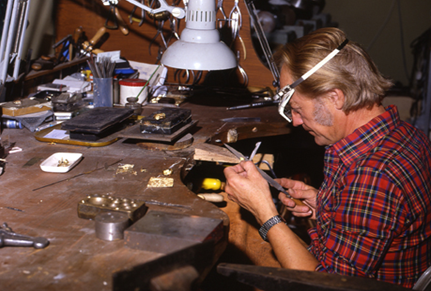
Arne Blomberg i arbete -OTRS pending

== Biography ==
Arne Blomberg, was born in 1930 in Gothenburg, Sweden. He started off by studying at Valand School of Art and continued later on at the Goldsmiths´Company Trege where he got a journeyman exam, and followed up by an engineering degree and a master's degree as engraver. At the age of 30, Blomberg bought a farm outside of Uddevalla, a small town on the west coast of Sweden. To make a living he tilled the soil during the summers and designed and manufactured jewelry during the wintertime. After ten years he bought another farm on Öddö, an island close by. Shortly thereafter he took over the local jewelry shop, Krohn Jewel in Strömstad. After ten years on the west coast Arne Blomberg left Sweden and moved to Idar-Oberstein, also called the precious gemstone metropolis in Germany. After a few years he moved on to Spain both to live and work until his death in 2006. He died at the age of 76.

== Noted works ==
Arne Blomberg's work has reached high reputation and success worldwide. His work is currently available to be seen at many sites and museums in Europe, North America, the Netherlands and Saudi Arabia as well as in the royal houses of Sweden. Two of Blomberg's most mentioned works are the vase with flowers created in quartz, gold, amethysts, tourmalines and opals and The Tree, created with 1.75 kilo gold, quartz, amethysts, emeralds and diamonds. The two sculptures were later on sold to Saudi Arabia. Blomberg also created, other than sculptures and jewelry, a bridal crown, held an opal exhibition and his last work was the jewel collection Nature of Sweden, inspired by the Swedish nature.

== Gallery ==
Jewelry designed and produced by Arne Blomberg for the collection Nature of Sweden.

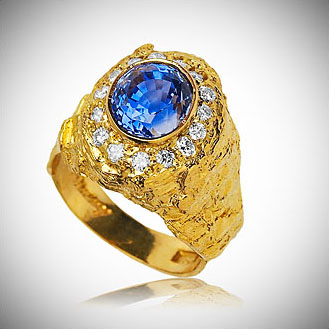
Ring (Design by Arne Blomberg)

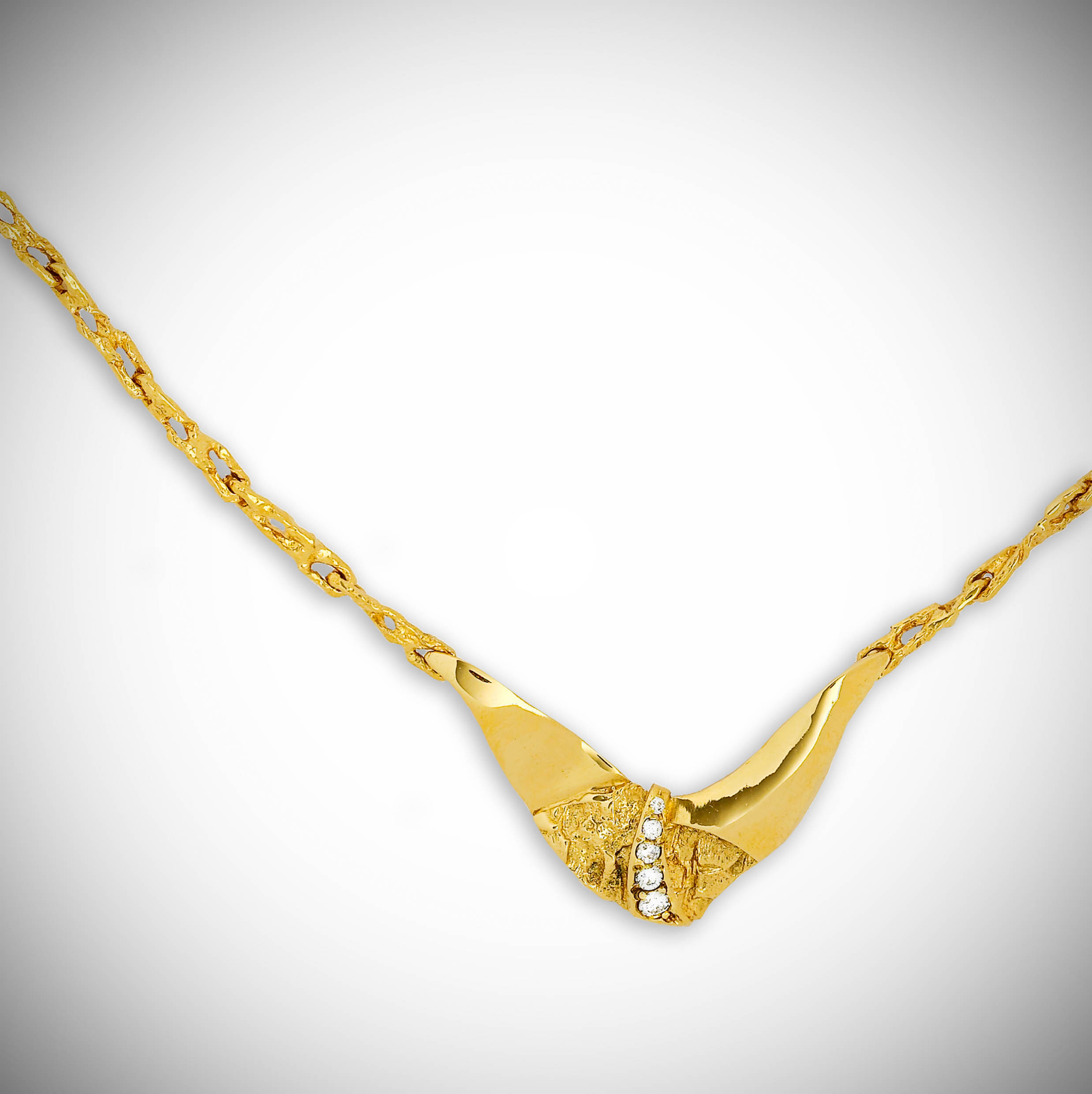
Necklace (Design by Arne Blomberg) -OTRS pending

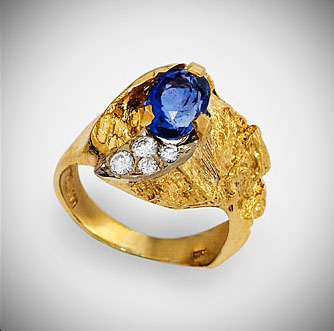
Ring (Design by Arne Blomberg)

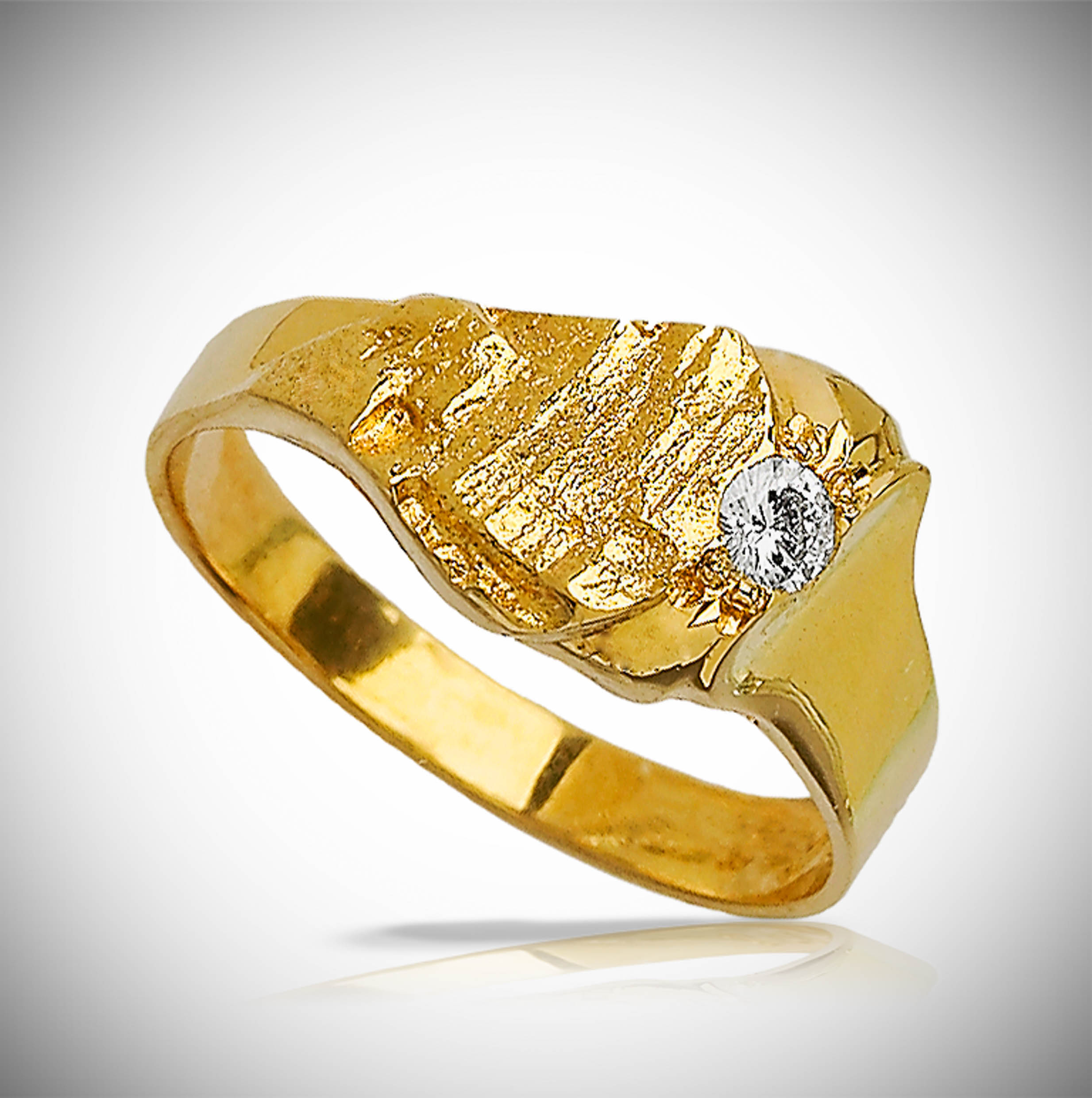
Ring (Design by Arne Blomberg) -OTRS pending

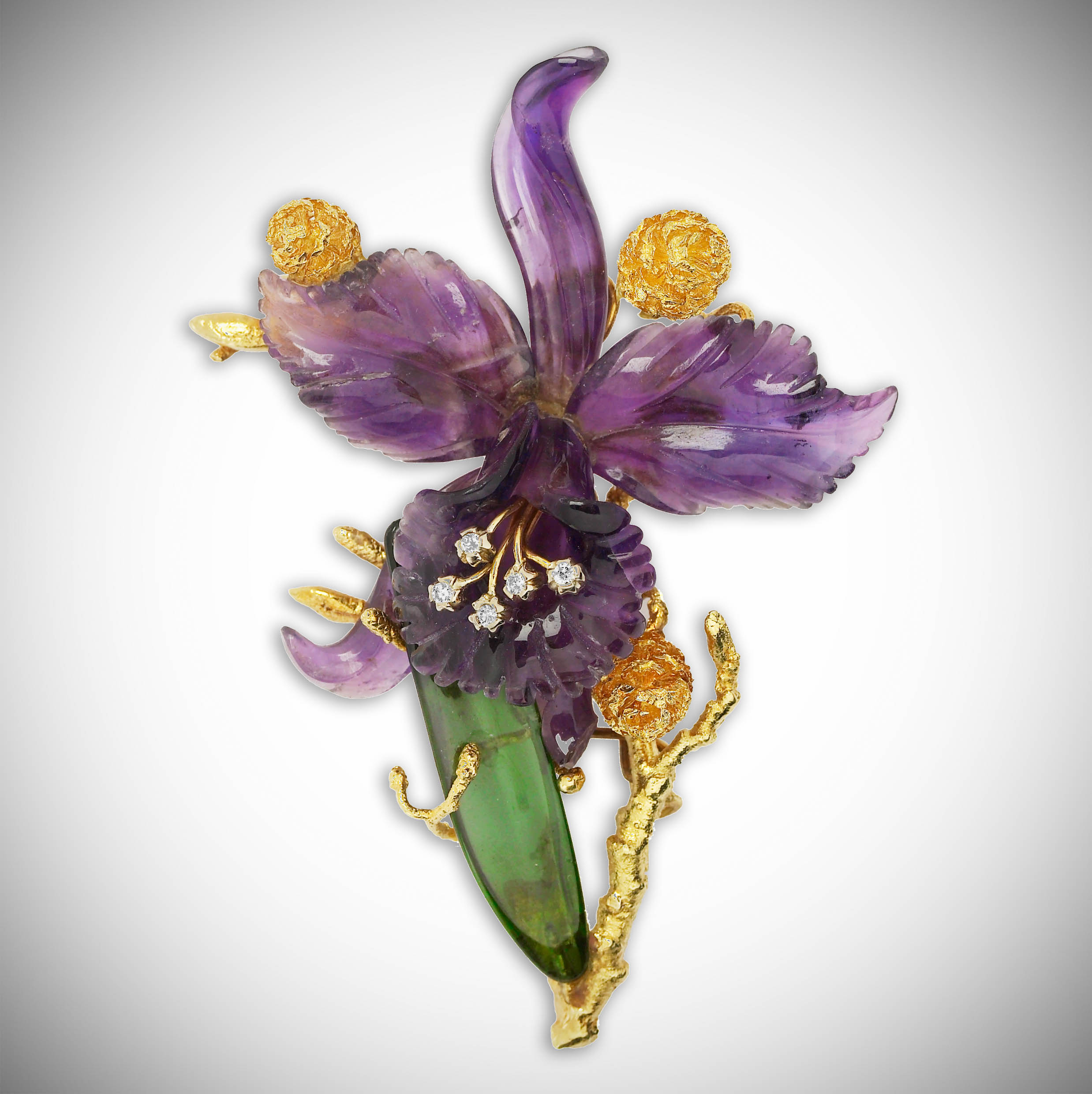
Brooch (flower) (Design by Arne Blomberg) -OTRS pending

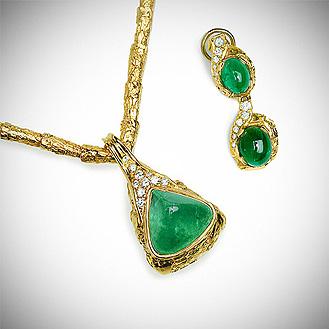
Necklace and ear-drops (Design by Arne Blomberg) -OTRS pending
