= Vannetta Seecharran =

Vannetta Seecharran is a London-based jewellery artist, working in silver and other materials. The work explores the relationship between silver and fabric in jewellery and inhabits the boundary between fashion and jewellery. Her work has been commissioned and exhibited by museums and galleries around the world. Seecharran is also an art lecturer and teaches jewellery classes from her studio.

== Biography ==
Seecharran was born in Guyana in and at the age of 11 emigrated with her parents to New York City. She graduated from Parsons School of Art with a BA in Product Design / Jewellery Design and then attended the State University of New York at New Paltz and graduated with an MFA in Jewellery.

In 1998, she moved to London and started working from her studio in Clerkenwell. Her work has continued to evolve since then and continues to experiment with and develop the use of fabric in silver jewellery.

Recent exhibitions:

- 2007: 'Collect 2007' - Victoria & Albert Museum, London, UK
- 2006: 'Shape of Things' - Bristol Museum & Art Gallery, UK
- 2004: 'Transient' - Royal Pump Room Museum & Gallery, Leamington Spa, UK
- 2004: 'Feast Your Eyes' - Victoria & Albert Museum, London, UK
- 2004: 'SOFA 2004' - New York, NY, USA
- 2003: 'SOFA 2003' - New York, NY, USA
- 2002: 'SOFA 2002' - New York, NY, USA
- 2000: 'Gallerie Orea' - Munich, Germany
- 2000: 'Inhorgenta' - Munich, Germany
- 1999: 'Schmuck' - Munich, Germany

== Images ==
Silver & Ribbon Bracelet

Silver & Ribbon Bracelet
