= Selim Mouzannar =

Lebanese jeweler

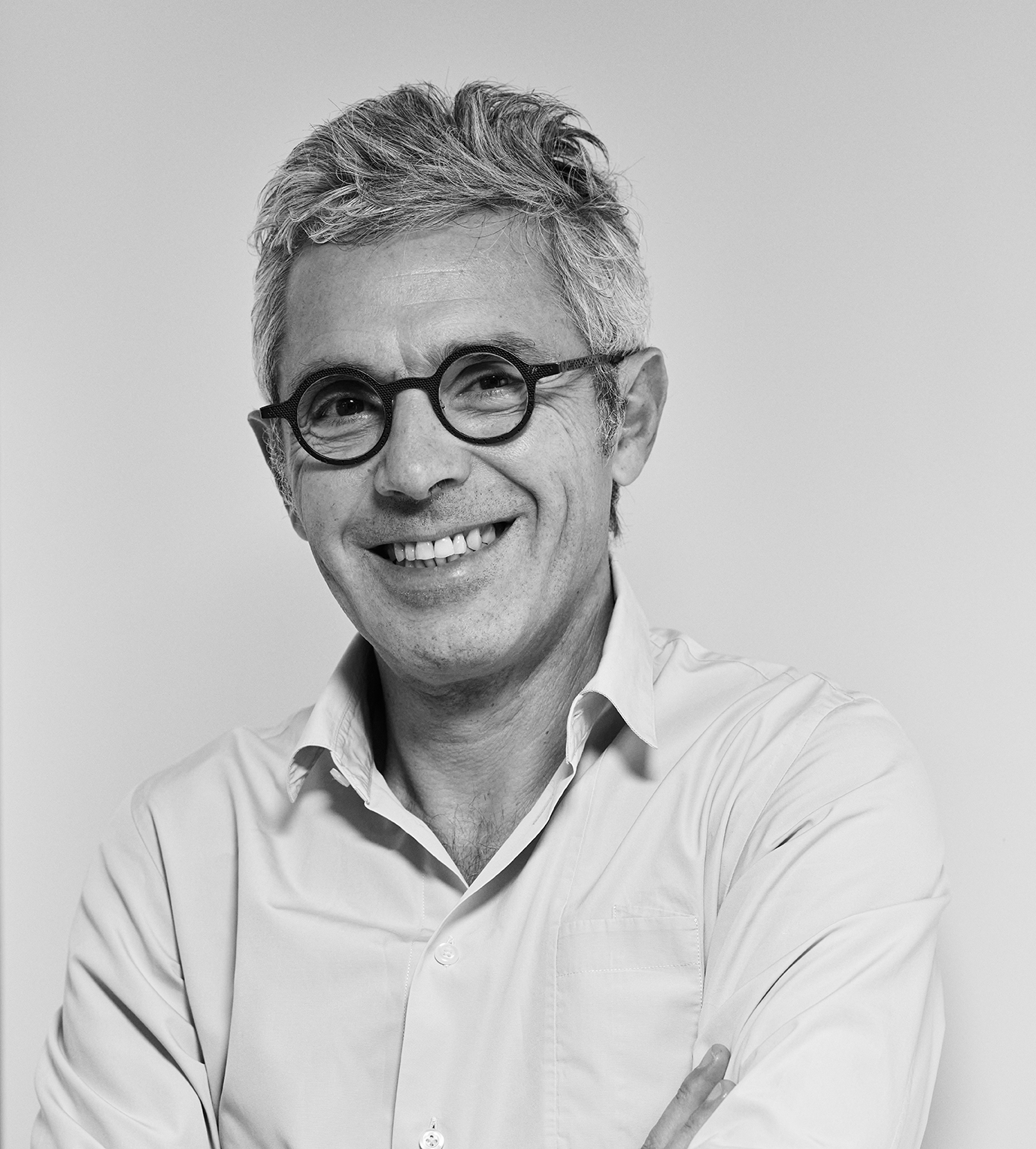
- Portrait of Selim Mouzannar
- Born: February 5, 1963 (age 63); Beirut, Lebanon
- Known for: Designer

Selim Mouzannar (born February 5, 1963) is a French-Lebanese jeweler and civic activist. He is the founder and CEO of Selim Mouzannar, his eponymous jewellery house and artisanal manufacturing corporation based in Beirut, Lebanon.

== Biography ==
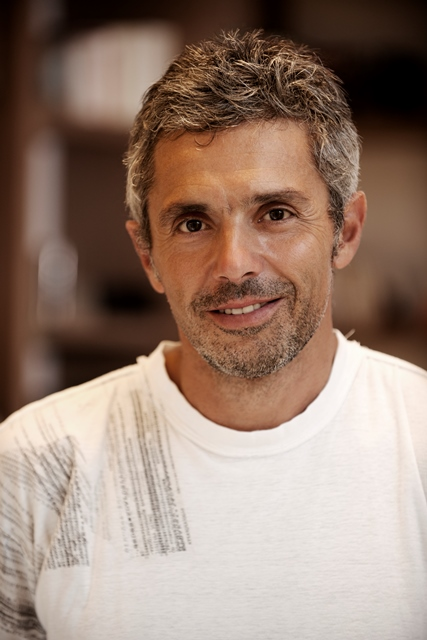
Selim Mouzannar

Scion of a family of craftsmen originally from Damascus, Syria. Mouzannar was shaped by training at his father's jewelry shop in Beirut's old souks.

In 1980, Mouzannar left Lebanon in the midst of the Lebanese Civil War and went to study in Paris, France. He graduated with a degree in mineralogy and gemology in 1983. From 1984, Mouzannar worked as a production and purchasing manager for a jeweler in Saudi Arabia. In 1989, he moved to Bangkok, Thailand, managing an international workshop. In the late 1980s, he spent 6 months at the Thai-Cambodian border working in a Ruby mine.

In 1990, Mouzannar headed back to Paris, where he acquired additional mineralogy expertise from Institut National de Gemmologie. He returned to Beirut, Lebanon in 1993 to establish his own jewelry brand, Maison Selim Mouzannar. Mouzannar opened his workshop followed by his flagship store 5 years later in Beirut.

Following the 2006 war over Lebanon, Mouzannar participated in worldwide exhibitions.

Mouzannar is known for his crafting technique, known as 'Falamenk' ("Flemish" in Arabic), which combines rose-cut diamonds, with silver-bottomed bezel settings.

Several celebrities have been seen and featured wearing jewels designed by Selim Mouzannar, such as pop star Rihanna, actress Gwyneth Paltrow, Emma Stone at the opening of the Venice Film Festival in 2016, Jennifer Lawrence when promoting her movie Passenger in Seoul in December 2016., French actress Isabelle Adjani during a visit to Beirut in 2017, and Star Wars's new trilogy vedette Daisy Riddley on the movie promo tour in December 2017.

In 2016, Mouzannar created the 'Amal' Necklace, composed of emeralds of varying sizes and reflections. Amal won the "Best in Colored Gemstones" category of the Couture Award in Las Vegas, and was named one of "30 breathtaking jewels" by Forbes for the year 2016.

== Achievements ==
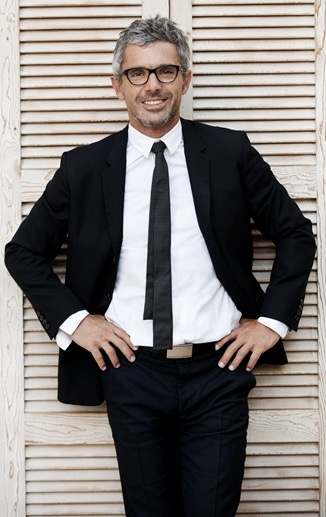
Selim Mouzannar in 2012

2010, Mouzannar is amongst five Middle East jewelry designers who featured at a Christie's auction.

2011, Selim is nominated as one of the best 5 jewelry designers of the year by Elle Style Awards during a ceremony held in Istanbul, Turkey.

2012, Selim is designated as one of the best 10 designers for the ‘Great Designers’ award by the World Gold Council.

2014, Mouzannar is designated amongst the 30 Lebanese who emerged and influenced Lebanon in 2014.

2016, Mouzannar's necklace 'Amal' was named as one of "30 breathtaking jewels" by Forbes for the year 2016.

== Awards ==
2016, Mouzannar wins the "Best in Colored Gemstones" category of the Couture Award in Las Vegas for his "Amal" Necklace. "Amal" (which means hope in Arabic) stages 47 emeralds from the Colombian mine of Muzo, crimped on hexagonal bases, among which are placed 8 trapiche emeralds.

== Community ==
As a member of the Executive Committee of Achrafieh2020, a citizen-led environmental initiative to reinvent Beirut's historic neighborhood of Ashrafieh as a sustainable and livable space, and as a joint founder of Right to Nonviolence, a NGO based in Beirut, focused on legal activism and advocacy,

Mouzannar was involved in the nonviolent Cedar Revolution of 2005 that forced the departure of the Syrian military from Lebanon.

A profile in the International Herald Tribune headlined ‘Translating violence into wearable beauty’ pointed to the cross-culture of Mouzannar's collection.
