= Joanna Angelett =

Australian jewellery designer

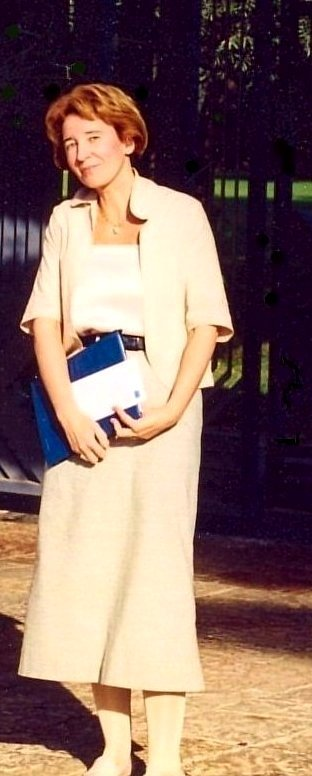
- Joanna Angelett
- Born: Joanna Trummer
- Occupations: Jewellery designer, author
- Known for: Founder of the worldwide anti-racism Tree of Life art project

Joanna Angelett is the artist name of Joanna Trummer, a British-Australian jewellery designer, author, founder of the worldwide anti-racism Tree of Life art project. As a designer she is best known for her sculpture-like jewellery, and as creator of desktop items of precious metals, decorated with gems and cloisonné enamels.

== Early career in Australia ==
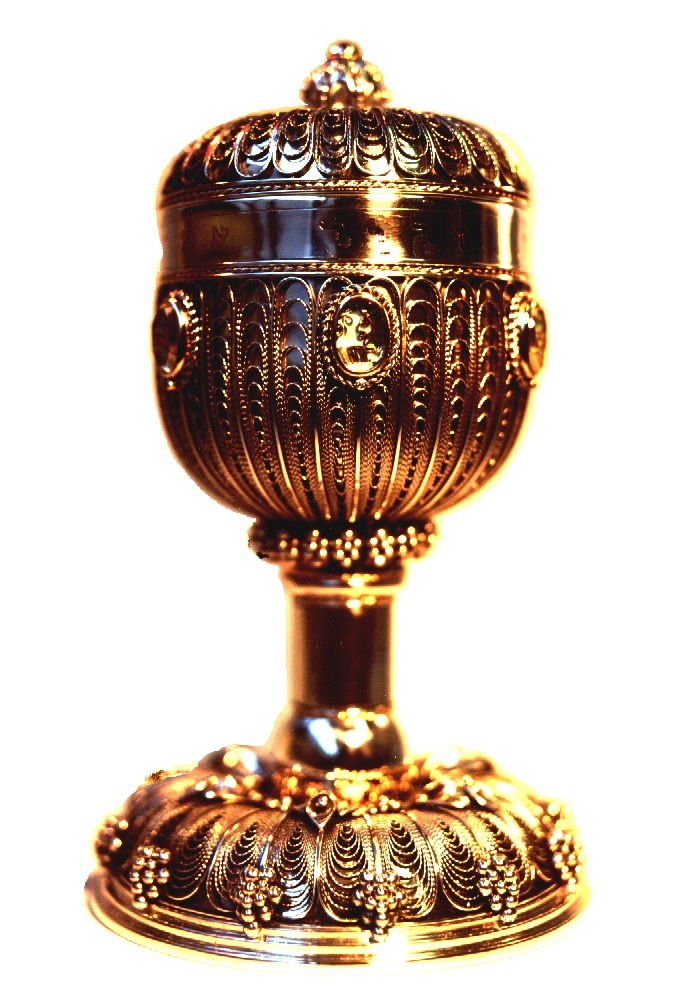
Cup of David from the Crystal Harp Collection

In 1992, Angelett started a jewellery design company called Olgene & Co in Sydney, Australia. In 1996, she designed and made the award-winning chalice Cup of David which represented Australia in the international design competition Jerusalem 3000, during the celebration of Jerusalem's 3000-year-anniversary in 1996. The chalice, made from gold and silver, decorated with cloisonné enamels, Australian diamonds and golden colored labradorite from New South Wales, was included in an international design catalogue and displayed in the Exhibition and Convention Centre in Jerusalem, where Angelett explained the jewellery techniques she had used in making it to the director of the Bible Lands Museum in Jerusalem. With her success in the Jerusalem 3000 competition, Angelett was congratulated by the Ambassador of Israel to Australia and the Lord Mayor of Perth Dr Peter Nattrass, who also attended the opening of her renamed company Jewellery Art Gallery after its relocation to Perth, Western Australia in 1998.

The newspaper The Western Australian wrote in the article 'Jewel in the Crown Displays Finery' published on 10 March 1998: " The Cup of David is the final item in Joanna Trummer Crystal Harp collection, a project she researched in Paris and London in 1990-91. Apart from Cup of David, the collection consists of ranging big items from precious metals and paintings - now contained in private collections overseas and in Australia - including the collection of former Prime Minister Paul Keating."

After the recognition of Angelett's Cup of David, called by German magazine Schmuck "a rarity, created with diverse, ancient and elaborate techniques" and her works, including the Snow Drops collection with Australian pearls which she launched in Perth, she started to showcase her works on the international market.

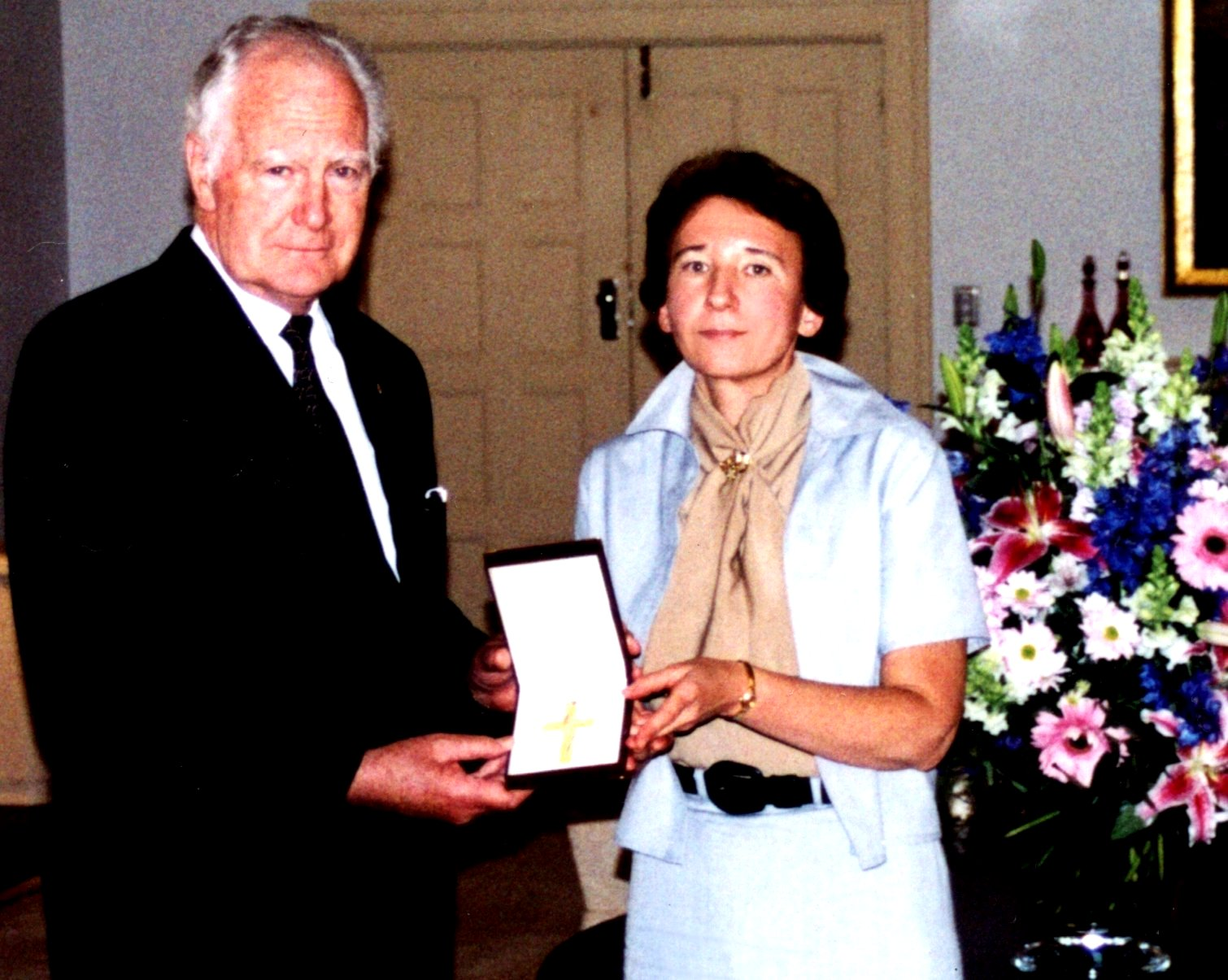
Artist Joanna Angelett and His Excellency Governor - General Dr Peter Hollingworth in Government House. Canberra 2002

In 1998 Angelett created an anti-racism art project. German magazine Schmuck wrote in 2001: "Joanna Trummer, one of Australia's leading designers and specialist in art history, founded three years ago, the internationally successful Menorah project". In the Menorah-Tree of Life project, later often called simply Tree of Life, according to Schmuck magazine "scientists, designers and journalists from Australia, Belgium, Israel and even the Pope" were participating. Angelett got the idea for the project while working on an object with biblical motive, in which she let "time" be represented by wings carrying symbolic light. She called the piece the Millennium Lamp. In the project, the biblical menorah represented the "magnificent almond tree" full of light, considered as a Tree of Life - "symbol of humanity and rejection of all forms of racism and violence".

The Tree of Life project was honoured by the Pope with a special award. The British magazine Sussex Style wrote: "His Holiness John Paul II himself blessed Angelett's creativity in 2000!" Shortly thereafter, her Tree of Life project was acclaimed by Prime Minister of Australia John Howard. The symbol of the project – the Golden Cross of Life, was selected for the Vatican collection and handed over to the Pope by the Apostolic Nunciature in Canberra in 2001. As president or the Tree of Life organization, Angelett was in 2002 invited to the Government House in Canberra to discuss the project with the Governor-General Dr. Peter Hollingworth, who donated a copy of Angelett's Golden Cross of Life, to the collection of the Government House of Australia and introduced the Tree of Life project to Queen Elizabeth II. The same year, she was also called "top Australian designer", by jewellery historian Dr Jack Ogden.

== Work in United States ==
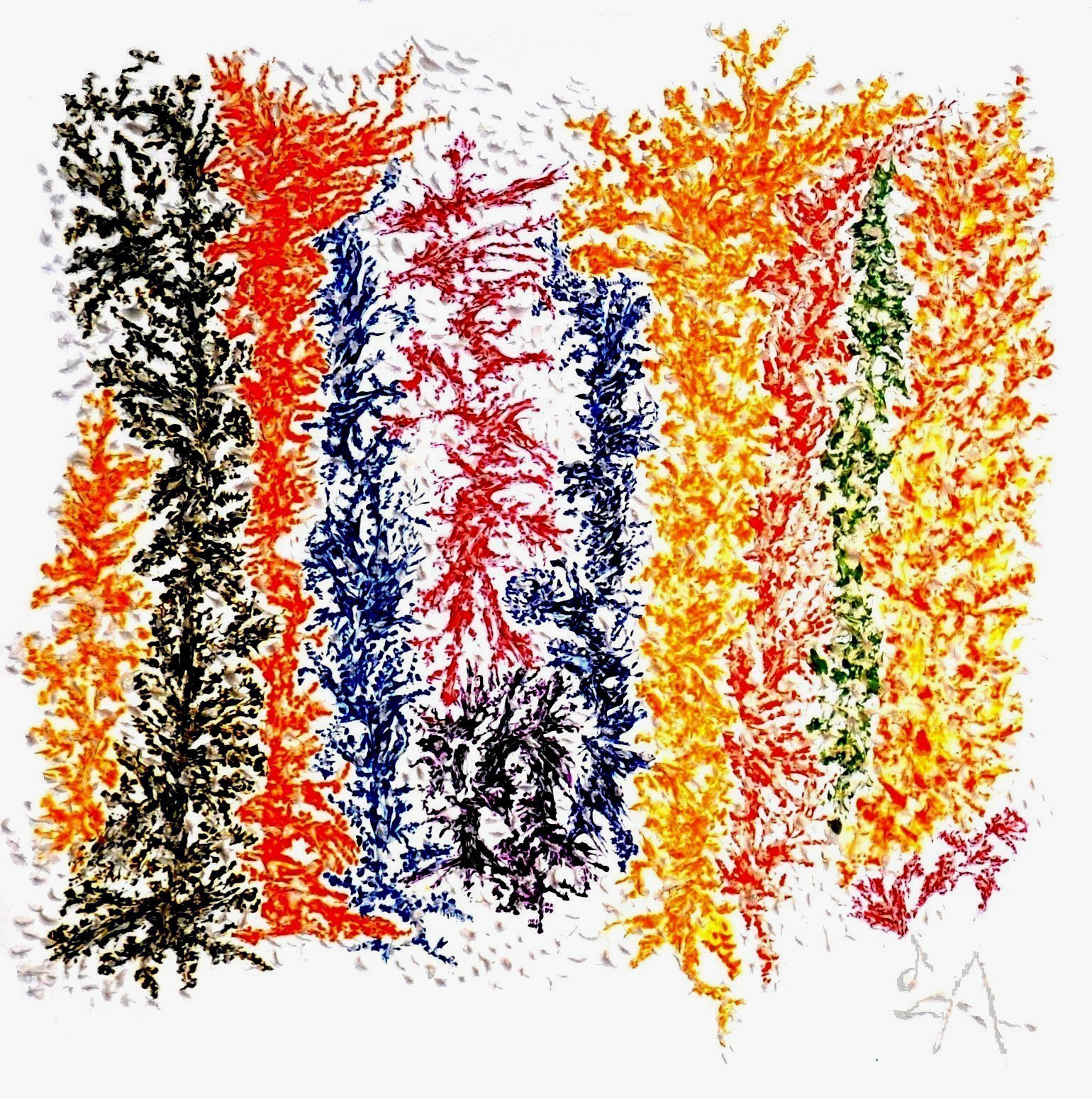
Painting Cantus Firmus from the collection Australia

Angelett, who also works in the wide range of art fields, creating paintings, sculptures and music, was recognized as "The Artist with Extraordinary Ability" by the United States Department of Justice in 2002. With an increased demand for her designs, she moved her company to the jewellery district of Los Angeles, California and renamed it Angelett Gallery, after one of her talented artist ancestors. She also started to use the name Angelett as her artist name.

That same year, Angelett received a letter from Queen Elizabeth II with words of support for the project. The Queen's letter, which expressed appreciation for her as an artist, inspired Angelett to create the Royal Garden collection in her "sculpture-like" jewelry style.

During her time in the United States, the Governor of New York invited Angelett to meet with Secretary of State of New York Randy Daniels, whose department ordered a copy of the Golden Cross of Life for its collection.

== Work in United Kingdom ==
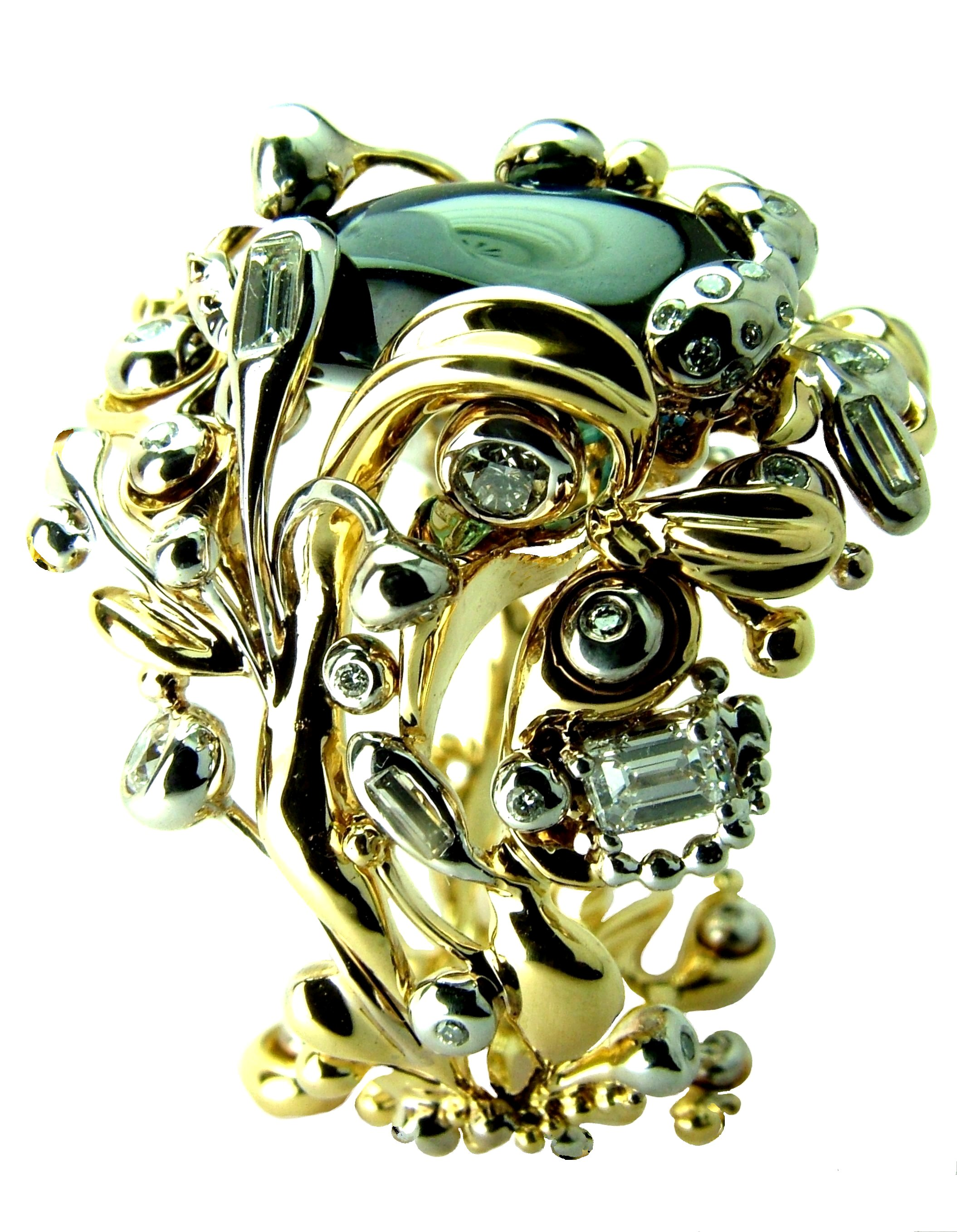
Ring Veronica Perfoliata from the Royal Garden Collection

In 2006, Angelett was granted "The Artist with Significant Achievement" visa by the British Home Office. In 2007, she relocated her company to Sussex, England, and in 2008, she established an art and jewellery design gallery in the Hatton Garden jewelry district in central London, where during the period from 2008 to 2019 Angelett established several new art collections and wrote the short story cycle, published in British press, about inspiration behind the creation of art objects.

From 2013 Joanna Angelett is holding dual British-Australian nationality.

In 2015–16, Angelett launched two new jewelry collections – Geological, consisting of rings with rare minerals in settings, including the Miner's Ring, made with gold from Western Australia and newly discovered gold crystals (mineral) from the Salsigne gold mine in France, and The Characters – a collection of luxury objects, for some of which a German sculptor, whose ancestor worked for the House of Fabergé, carved small sculptures according to Angelett designs from agate, to be used as part of the composition of these items.

In London, Angelett continued to work on and expand the Royal Garden collection inspired by the Australian nature. An example from the collection is the ring Veronica Perfoliata created with the use of CAD and laser technology. In parallel with modern techniques Angelett is continuing to use the ancient technique of cloisonné, which was used in the Cup of David in Australia. The Holy Kingdom Ring, designed by Angelett in London for the former Governor-General of Australia Dr Hollingworth, is implemented in this technique. The Holy Kingdom Ring is "Manifestation of biblical passage which painted a picture of Holy Kingdom with the image of Jesus Christ depicted in ancient technique of polychrome cloisonné enamel". For creation of this ring Angelett conducted research on "remarkable collection of papal rings, dating back to fourteenth century" in the British Museum in London.

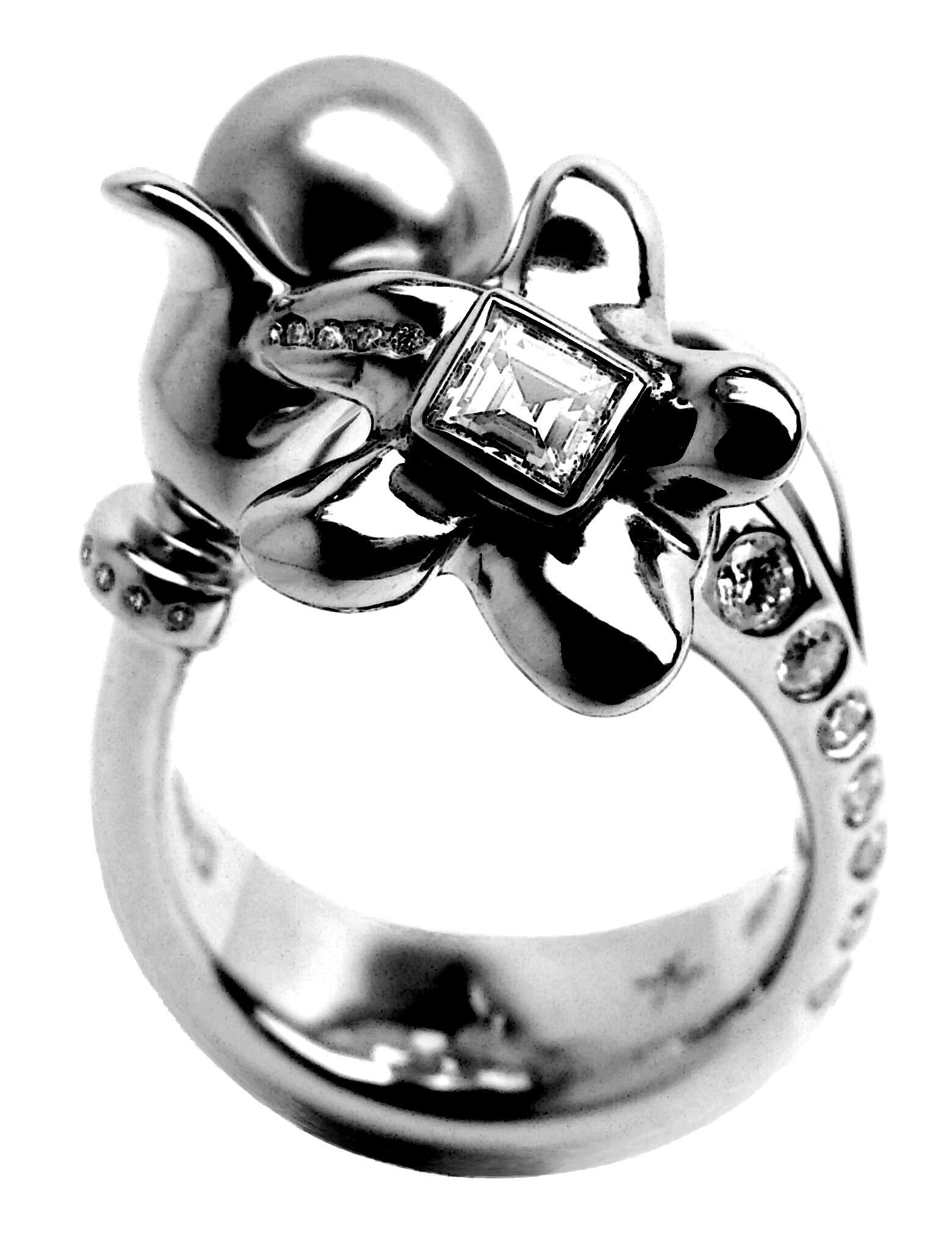
Ring After the Rain from the Royal Garden Collection

Her palladium ring After the Rain from the Royal Garden Collection, created in sculpture-like style, became The First British Jewellers' Association Palladium Jewellery Award winner in 2010 and her collections have been exhibited in several noted venues, including the Mansion House and Goldsmiths' Hall in London in 2009.

In 2017 Joanna Angelett has been nominated as one of the major authors-contributors by the Gems & Jewellery magazine, where both of her recent articles - 'Christmas Lake' and The 'Emerald Desert' - are displaying rings in form of miniature 'jewellery-sculptures' from her latest collection 'The Characters', that has been created in Hatton Garden premises of Angelett Gallery in London and expanded there significantly during 2018.

Collection 'The Characters', as a thematic line, is designed as a main direction of Angelett further work in the field of art.

== Major exhibitions ==
- Jerusalem 3000, Exhibition and Convention Center, Jerusalem, Israel (1996)
- Goldsmiths' Hall, London, UK (2009)
- Mansion House, London, UK (2009)

== Representation in notable collections ==
- Collection of the Holy See, Vatican
- Collection of the Government House, Canberra, Australia
- Collection of the Office of the Governor of New York, USA
