= Albion Smith =

Albion Smith is a California jeweller and silversmith known for ornate functional items, including a piece in the Smithsonian Institution.

== Biography ==
Smith's work includes a combination of jewelry (rings, bracelets, pendants) and functional objects such as teapots, goblets, flasks, urns and keepsake boxes. He designs, forms and fabricates each of his works by hand. The patterns of ornamentation in his works are frequently cut from silver sheet and soldered to the base plate. The surfaces of his works often feature applied patinas or hammered textures. Many of his works are adorned with semi-precious or precious stones, bone, horn, and even ancient mastodon tusk from glacier-finds in Alaska and Siberia.

In 1995, one of his teapots was purchased by the Oakland Museum Of California, https://museumca.org, (object A95.15) for its permanent collection.

In 1996, another of his teapots was made part of the permanent collection at the Smithsonian Museum of American Art in Washington, DC.

In 2008 Smith began a project to print his Haiku poetry. He designed a type face, cut the 1217 required letters out of sheet copper, mounted them to an aluminum plate and then printed the book using a hand press he designed and built. Renowned book artists, Peter and Donna Thomas later selected Albion's book of Haiku, Only Love, for their exquisite process. They used his original font blocks, made the paper, and hand bound the book. You can find the process here: http://www.baymoon.com/~peteranddonna/2-only.htm

THE SCOLDING WREN
I JUST STAND THERE
AND TAKE IT

Albion Smith

The letters were subsequently digitized and are available as a digital font named AS_Coppercut.

He is married to Elissa Forsyth and lives in Northern California near Santa Cruz. He is now teaching his techniques at Cabrillo College.
