= Elizabeth Kirkeby =

English merchant

- Occupations: Goldsmith, merchant
- Spouse: John Kirkeby (died 1482)

Elizabeth Kirkeby was a 15th-century English goldsmith and merchant. She was one of the wealthiest women in London when she died.

== Life ==
She was born in London to an artisan family and married John Kirkeby, a goldsmith who died in 1482. She had been married and widowed twice before marrying John Kirkeby. After his death, Elizabeth took over the management of her late husband's business and expanded it. By manufacturing and selling gold pieces, she became successful enough to open a mercantile shop and a shipping firm.

As she preferred to stay in London, Kirkeby employed many assistants to act as her business agents in her transactions on the European Continent, such as George Bulstrode who worked for her in Seville, Spain. Bulstrode later courted her for three years, which was unusually long for the time. Over the courtship, he gave her many gifts, including jewels, fine cloths and a parrot. He later claimed that while he was in Seville, Kirkeby's brother John Heron convinced her not to marry Bulstrode. The law of time meant that if she married again, she would be considered a minor and her businesses would be given to her new spouse. Bulstrode subsequently sued Kirkeby at the Court of Arches to uphold the contract, but she was too ill to attend the court and the case never went ahead.

Kirkeby ultimately never remarried, but on her deathbed she agreed to return the jewels and goods that Bulstrode had given to her, as well as £40 for his trouble. However after her death, her executor and brother John Heron, who originally agreed to carry out her wishes, refused to return them to Bulstrode.
