= Celine Engelstad =

Norwegian jewelry company

- Company type: AS
- Industry: Jewelry
- Founded: 2007; 19 years ago
- Founder: Celine Engelstad, Gunnvor Vik
- Headquarters: Professor Dahls gate 21, 0353 Oslo, Norway
- Products: Jewels
- Revenue: NOK 6.6 million (2009) - AS + DA
- Number of employees: 4
- Website: http://www.celineengelstad.no/

Celine Engelstad AS is a Norwegian jewelry company headquartered in Oslo, Norway. The company was founded in 2007 by Celine Engelstad and Gunnvor Vik. The company produces handmade unique jewelry. They launched their first jewelry collection in October 2008.

By today several well-known persons are fond of being associated with the brand Celine Engelstad. Among others, to be mentioned are Lady Gaga, Rihanna, Paris Hilton, Tone Damli Aaberge, Princess Märtha Louise and Daniel Franck.

== Description ==
Since their market entry in 2008 the company has been growing at 40 percent (2009–2010), highlighted by the recent establishment of an AS in 2010. Suppliers are located outside Hong Kong, and the chain has a total of 60 stores in Norway. The company's two main dealers are Mestergull and Thune.

The firm offers handmade and partly machine-made unique jewelry, focusing on details, hand-crafting and unique combinations of materials. Silver and 14 carat gold are used as basic materials, decorated with Swarovski crystals, freshwater pearls, leather, glass and other stones.
