= Mary Lyon (writer) =

American columnist, reporter and jeweller

- Occupations: Columnist, reporter, political commentator, and jeweller

Mary Lyon is an American columnist, reporter, political commentator, and jeweller. One of the first women to hired at television and radio stations in the Los Angeles area, Lyon was the first female news director at KNAC, the first woman to host a talk show on KLOS, the first woman news director at KHJ and one of the first women to be hired for NBC's The Source. In 2011, she was made a member of Pacific Pioneer Broadcasters.

== Biography ==
=== Early life and education ===
Lyon grew up in West Los Angeles where she attended Marymount High School. She received a bachelor's degree in Studio Art from the University of California, Irvine in 1975.

=== Career ===
Lyon began her radio career with four years of college radio at UC Irvine's KUCI-FM. One of the first women to hired, she has reported for television and radio stations in the Los Angeles area including KFWB-AM, 1975; KNAC-FM, 1975–76; KLOS-FM, 1976–77; 93KHJ-AM, 1977–79; KRTH-FM, 1982–87; KLSX, 1987, and KTLA-TV. As the news director at KRTH-FM, Los Angeles, she was one of three rotating hosts for 8 O'Clock Talk. From 1979-1982, she worked for NBC Radio Network's "The Source" in New York and Burbank CA. She joined the Associated Press as West Coast entertainment reporter in 1987, where she remained until 1995.

Lyon is an advocate for causes including responsibility and accountability in media, environmental education and support of the arts for children, and green living. Lyon contributes to The Huffington Post, OpEd News, Democrats.us, World News Trust, the LA Progressive, and WeDemocrats.org's "We! The People" webzine.

In 1999 Lyon hosted the DIY Network show DIY Crafts. Additionally, Lyon was seen frequently as a guest on HGTV's Smart Solutions and The Carol Duvall Show. Lyon wrote "The Crafty Mom" column for L.A. Parent magazine until the magazine folded in 2008.

Following her retirement from radio Lyon has returned to her interest in studio art, designing bead jewelry which has been exhibited around the country. Her original “Gold Nugget” bead design is part of the permanent collection of The Bead Museum in Glendale, Arizona.

== Published works ==
- The Frazzled Working Woman's Practical Guide to Motherhood (Starburst Publishers, 1997)

== Awards ==
Lyon has won journalism awards including five Golden Mike Awards during her career at KRTH-FM, honors from the Los Angeles Press Club, and the Associated Press Mark Twain Award.
