= Alexandra Mor =

American jewellery designer

Alexandra Benzaquine Mor
- Occupations: Jewelry designer and creative director

Alexandra Mor is an American jewelry designer and creative director, who founded her jewelry brand ALEXANDRA MOR from headquarters in New York City's Diamond District in from 2010- 2021.

== Early life ==
Mor was born and raised in Israel´s multicultural Mélange. At a young age her French couturier mother taught her the concept of handcrafted design which suited her affinity for the creative realm.

== Career ==
Mor started to pursue a career as a filmmaker and worked as assistant director and producing manager. In 2004 she found her passion in jewelry during a jewelry bench class in New York City´s Jewelry District.

== ALEXANDRA MOR (The brand) ==
The collections under the ALEXANDRA MOR brand are distinguished by details of knife-edged wire and yellow gold interior lining using diamonds and gemstones. Mor launched her brand and first limited-edition collection at the Phillips de Pury auction house in December 2010, and in 2014, launched her first retail jewelry collection at Dorfman Jewelers in Boston. In 2015, Mor debuted a series of pieces created exclusively for the New York City retailer Bergdorf Goodman.

Mor's work has been worn on the red carpet by many, including Oprah, Lupita Nyong'o and Mila Kunis.

In 2016, after spending a decade working in New York City, Mor moved to the island of Bali in Indonesia.

For the 2019 edition of the US Protagonist Event, Mor created a Capsule Collection featuring the tagua seed and emeralds from the Muzo Mines in Colombia.

== Sustainable materials and cultural impact ==
Mor designs jewelry by being inspirited by personal relationship to her clients, by history, femininity and strength. She uses diamonds and colored gemstones set in platinum and 18K gold.

After spending a year in Bali, Indonesia, she created a special jewelry line from the seed of Amazonian Taque tree, the botanical alternative to elephant ivory. She was motivated to fabricate a product which looks like elephant ivory to help protect elephants from being robbed of their tusks. The collection features Tagua seeds, black and red Balinese wood, Sumatran pearls and 22 karat yellow gold alongside Mor's signature details of knife-edged wire, gemstones and Diamond melee. In 2017, Mor introduced her collection and concept for using Tagua as a luxury material at Vogue Italia's annual US Protagonist event.

== Awards and recognitions ==
In 2013 Mor received the Fine Jewellery Rising Star Award at Fashion Group International´s in the Fine Jewelry category.,

Following the 2017 Protagonist collaboration, Vogue Italia named Mor as creative director of the annual event.

In 2018 she was named Innovator of the Year by Town & Country Magazine.
