= Ambaji Shinde =

Jewelry designer (1917–2003)

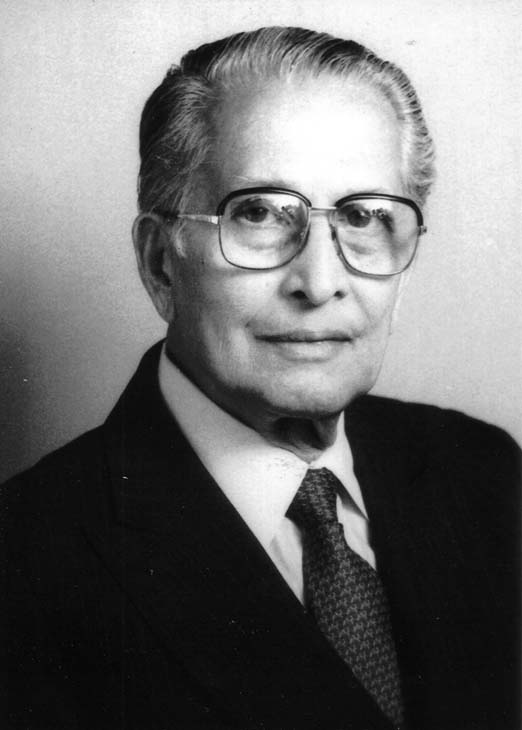
- Portrait of Shinde
- Born: Ambaji Venkatesh Shinde; 22 December 1917; Mapuçá, Goa, Portuguese India
- Died: 8 April 2003 (aged 85); United States
- Education: J. J. School of Art
- Years active: 1937–2001
- Spouse: Anu Shinde (m. 1940)
- Children: 6

Ambaji Venkatesh Shinde (22 December 1917 – 8 April 2003) was a jewelry designer based in New York City. The book "Harry Winston The Ultimate Jeweler" published in 1984 acknowledges Shinde as "one of the most talented designers in the world today." A number of his jewelry designs appear in this book.

== Early life ==
Ambaji Venkatesh Shinde was born on 22 December 1917 in Mapuçá, Goa, a Portuguese colony, in a Bombay Presidency-origin family that had immigrated illegally to Goa from British India. He was drawn towards decorative arts at an early age painting backdrops and costume jewelry for the local Hindu temple religious functions.

== Career ==
Shinde came to Bombay in 1934 to attend the J. J. School of Art. In his talk with Dona Dirlam of the Gemological Institute of America (GIA) he said that the formal study in textile design influenced his later work. He had to seek work when his father died in 1937. His first job was at Narottamdas Jhaveri where he designed ornate silverware, trophies and jewelry. He was hired by Nanubhai Jhaveri in 1941 where he worked for nearly 20 years designing jewelry for the Maharajas (Kings).

He followed the rich Indian tradition in his designs. He had a small picture of the Flying Apsara from Ajanta cave number 17 in his office. The design criteria changed when the Maharajas started to go abroad and desired western style jewelry.

American jeweler Harry Winston met Shinde in 1955 wherein he was recognized and eventually hired him in 1962. He soon developed a gemstone driven style transforming fine jewelry into fine art. Winston invented flexible, three-dimensional, near invisible mountings which freed the stones from heavy metal surrounds.

After four decades of working in New York City, Shinde retired in December 2001 but continued to paint from home. He donated a number of designs to the Gemological Institute of America for a permanent display. Thousands of his designs remain in the Harry Winston archives and "provides a creative spark to ignite new interpretations of Harry Winston jewels for the next generations".

== Personal life ==
Shinde married Anu in 1940. They had six sons and 10 grandchildren. He had a large circle of close friends, loved Indian classical music and spicy food.

He died on 8 April 2003 of pneumonia which he contracted in a Manhattan hospital.

== Style ==
A Shinde painting of a necklace illustrates his mastery of the art of jewelry designing.

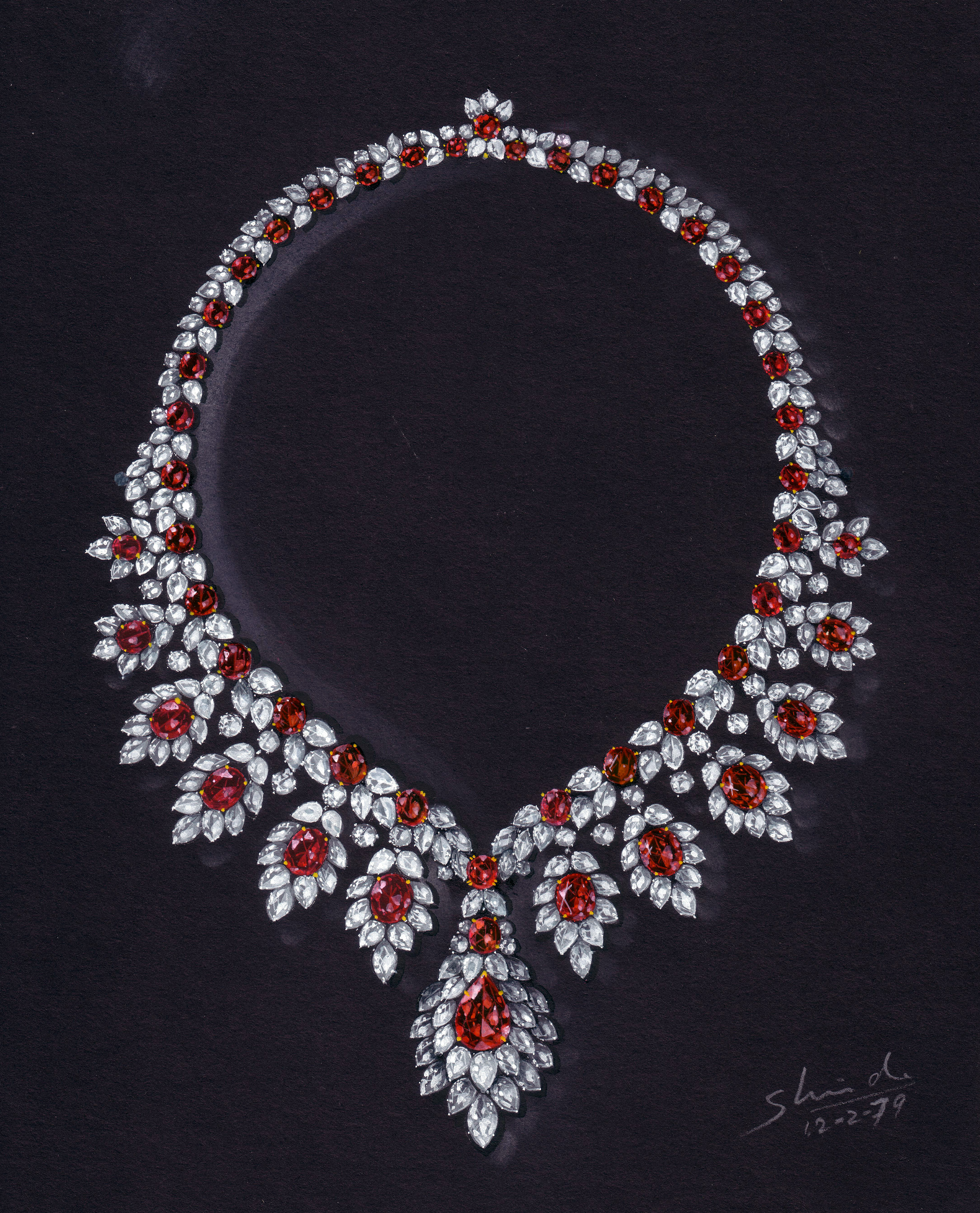
Design by Ambaji Shinde
