= Lilian von Trapp =

German jewellery designer

Lilian von Trapp (born 1987) is a German jewellery designer and anti-mining activist.

== Biography ==
Von Trapp was born in 1987. She was raised in Berlin. She studied law before working as a designer. Von Trapp became interested in jewellery making after she inherited her mother's collection. She founded her own label in 2016, working exclusively with recycled gold and vintage diamonds in order to combat the mining industry. She is an outspoken critic of mining and its effects on local economies and ecosystems. She practices sustainable jewellery making, and has her pieces handcrafted in Germany.

Von Trapp is a board member of the Earthbeat Foundation, which focuses on undoing damage caused by gold and diamond mining in Uganda.
