= Zoltan David =

Hungarian-American jewelry designer

Zoltán Dávid
- Born: 17 August 1955 (age 71); Szombathely, Hungary
- Occupation: jeweler
- Website: www.zoltandavid.com

Zoltán Dávid (born 17 August 1955) is a Hungarian-born American jewelry designer based in Texas. His business, Zoltan David Precious Metal Art, opened in 1980 and has focused on individually crafted one-off pieces. On August 27, 1988, he was knighted by the Hungarian nation in honour of his father, Zoltan David I.

In November 2003 David was awarded a patent from the USPO for an inlay technique first developed in 2000 which created hard-wearing, three-dimensional raised patterns in precious metal, such as platinum inlaid with gold. He has also patented a design for convertible hoop earrings called the 'Dangelier' which can be dismantled to be worn in three different ways, and was one of the first to decorate the metal under the stone in a ring, although he did not patent this technique. In a departure from jewelry, David collaborated with the guitarist Lance Keltner to co-design a guitar slide which is, as of 2012, patent-pending.

As of 2012 David has also launched a leather goods line, designing belts which he retails alongside his jewelry.

Before starting his business in 1980, Zoltan David Fine Jewelry Design, David received training as a goldsmith and diamond setter from German and Swiss masters.

== Awards ==
Among the multiple national and international industry design awards David has won are:

- 1979 – DeBeers Diamonds Today Award
- 1989 – AGTA Spectrum Award
- 1992 – AGTA Spectrum Award
- 1994 – American Jewelry Design Council – New Design Talent, New York; Jewelers of America – New Designer of the Year, New York.
- 1996 – Finalist, Ponte d’ Oro Competition, Italy
- 1998 – AGTA Spectrum Award; Platinum Guild International, Platinum Passion Award
- 2001 – AGS Director's Choice Award; AGS Excellence in Gold Design Award; 2001 – AGS Excellence in Overall Design Award
- 2004 – AGTA Spectrum Award
- 2005 – Jewelry Designer of the Year – Contemporary Design Group
- 2007 – Tanzanite Foundation, ‘Be Born To Tanzanite’ Award; AGTA Spectrum Award - Classical Division.
- 2009 – "Best of Silver" National Jeweler Magazine Design Award; America's Coolest Jewelry Store – InStore Magazine.
- 2010 – "Designers Award", International Pearl Design Competition, Cultured Pearl Association of America.
