= Sherry Wolf =

American photorealist painter and fashion designer (born 1949)

- Born: January 27, 1949 (age 77); Pikesville, Baltimore
- Education: University of Maryland
- Occupation: Fashion designer

Sherry Wolf (born January 27, 1949) is an American photorealist painter and fashion designer.

== Early life and education ==
Raised in Pikesville, Baltimore, Wolf studied art history at the University of Maryland, where she gained a magna cum laude degree.

== As artist ==
In 1970, after graduation, Wolf went to work for NBC Washington as the resident artist for the then NBC Nightly News anchorman David Brinkley, where she produced quick VIP portraits from wired photographs. She was commissioned by the White House during the Nixon administration to produce a series of paintings of Tricia Nixon Cox's wedding, also from photographs. She moved to Manhattan in late 1971. On her website Wolf states that she established the Adult Art Program at George Washington University. Also during this period Wolf was a regular attendee of the Studio 54 nightclub. By 1973, her work was widely published, including commercial work for record covers and calendars, and magazine commissions, such as depictions of indigenous peoples for National Geographic.

In 1973 Wolf moved to New York to focus on fine art, where she began painting large-scale photorealistic pictures depicting scenes and characters from contemporary New York high society. In 1979 she explained that her work was intended as a form of social commentary and criticism, such as Label Lady, a self-portrait showing Wolf as a fashion victim in head-to-toe designer wear. A lithograph of this painting is now in the Museum of the City of New York. In 1983, when the Albright-Knox Art Gallery acquired Wolf's self-portrait showing her in her studio, it was the gallery's first acquisition of contemporary American realist painting.

In the mid-1980s, until 2006, Wolf stepped back from public life to focus on her family and to bring up her two daughters. During this period she launched a jewelry line in 1994, but with the launch of her handbag line in 2006, Wolf completely reentered the public eye.

During Christmas 2009 Wolf's daughter Chelsea died following an adverse reaction to a date rape drug, and as a result of the tragedy, Wolf withdrew from her handbag business for two years, and ceased painting for four years. Wolf resumed painting after one of her long-time patrons and fans, the Hollywood producer Jerry Weintraub, introduced her to the art dealer Leisa Austin, who hosted Wolf's comeback exhibition in March 2014.

== As fashion designer ==
Alongside, and in addition to her painting career, Wolf has designed jewelry and fashion accessories. She launched a line of scarves in 1978 which she described as "half scarf, half jewelry," designed with practical pockets (sometimes shaped like hands) or whimsical appliqués of koalas and hearts. Her designs were sold through department stores such as Bergdorf Goodman, Saks Fifth Avenue and Neiman Marcus. In 1994, whilst bringing up her family, Wolf designed a range of jewelry featuring interchangeable charms that was sold exclusively through Neiman Marcus. In 2006 Wolf launched a line of handbags sold through Bergdorf Goodman, Saks, and Bloomingdales. Following her daughter's death in 2009, the handbag line went on hiatus for two years. Since relaunching her handbag line in 2011, Wolf has dedicated a bag each season to her daughter's memory, donating all profits from its sale to Bereaved Parents of the USA.
