= Giovanni Sebastiano Meyandi =

- Occupation: Jeweller
- Years active: 1762–1794

Giovanni Sebastiano Meyandi was an Italian jeweler, active in Italy between the years 1762 and 1794. He made drawings of his work, often leaving notes on the back of the drawings. These notes may have included the name of his client, what the jewelry was made of, how it was to be delivered, and who would be the recipient. His work is held in the collection of the Cooper-Hewitt, National Design Museum. There is also one design drawing for a necklace and earring held at the University of Michigan Museum of Art.
