= Larisa Popova (gemologist) =

Italian gemologist and appraiser

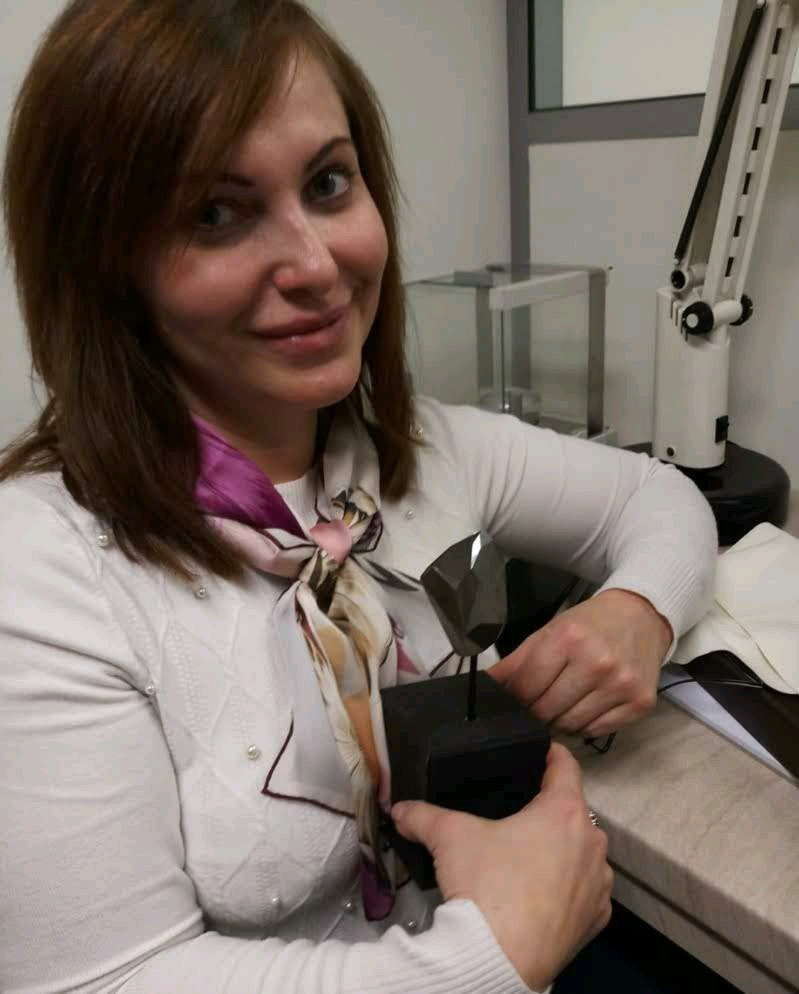
- Born: May 20, 1975 (age 50)
- Occupations: Gemologist, appraiser, jeweler
- Parent(s): Valentina Popova (mother); Yuriy Popov (father)

Larisa Popova (born May 20, 1975) is an Italian gemologist, appraiser and jeweler.

== Early life ==
Larisa Popova was born on May 20, 1975, to Valentina Popova and Yuriy Popov.

== Education ==
Larisa enrolled in a study program at Moscow University of Commerce and acquired her bachelor's in commerce. She earned her gemologist degree from HRD Antwerpen, which included courses on gemology, pearls, diamond grading, and diamond polishing. She then became a jewelry professional at the Gemological Institute of America. She has also attended a Color Stones Grading and Evaluation course from the International Gemological Institute. Later, she got her Personal Property Appraisal from the Insurance Institute of Jewelry Appraisal and joined the Perity Association of Italy for her jewelry appraisal for the court.

== Career ==
In 2016, Popova evaluated the 32-carat Koi Diamond, an orange and white diamond that is shaped like a pear and resembles a Japanese Koi fish. The diamond belongs to Emmanuel Abramchuk, the partner of Eddy Elzas.

In January 2017, she graded and evaluated Natural Rough Spinel of 185.22 carats. The unique stone had distinguished marks shown clearly in the middle of the stone at two hours, 3 and 9 o'clock. The written marks were in Arabic with "Allah, Mercy, and Suleiman" inscribed.

In January 2019, she made a Guinness World Record by grading and evaluating 555.55-carat Natural Black Diamond, a giant polished diamond. The diamond was sold out in February 2022 in Sotheby's auctions.

From February 2019 to January 2020, she represented the owner in several auction houses for the sale process.

Popova has also developed the Lotus cut, a precision diamond cut with more than 105 facets.

== Personal life ==
Eddy Elzas has only partnered with Larisa Popova in his life. Before his death in November 2021, they had an office in the Diamond Bourse building in Hovenierstraat 2, Antwerp, Belgium. They have worked with royal families, princesses, sultans, and various actors.
