= Wallace Chan =

Chinese jewellery artist and sculptor

Wallace Chan (Chinese: 陈世英; pinyin: Chén Shìyīng) is a Hong Kong–based jewellery artist and sculptor. He is known for creating intricate designs within carved gemstones. He is the mastermind behind the creation of what has been called the world’s most expensive diamond necklace. Chan is also known as an innovator. He invented the Wallace Cut, an illusionary carving technique, in 1987; a jade cutting and polishing technique in 2002, and The Wallace Chan Porcelain, a porcelain five times stronger than steel, in 2018, after seven years of research. His first porcelain creation, A New Generation (Ring), is in the permanent collection of The British Museum. He is the first contemporary Chinese jewellery artist to be part of the museum's collection.

== Early life ==
Chan was born in Fuzhou, China, in 1956 and moved to Hong Kong at the age of 5. He left school after only two years of education, when he was 13, in order to support his family. Chan became an apprentice sculptor in 1973, when he was 16 years old. But by 1974 he had moved on to set up his own carving workshop. He was a sculptor, carver and painter for decades before he began creating jewellery, wearable sculpture art, in 2001, after a six-month zen journey as a monk.

== Career ==
Chan got his first break while working in Macau when Yih Shun Lin, a Taiwanese art collector, commissioned him to create a stupa for the Fo Guang Shan Buddha Memorial Center in Kaohsiung. He was the first contemporary jeweller to hold a solo exhibition at the Capital Museum in Beijing and the first Asian jeweller to exhibit work at the Biennale de Paris. One of his noted pieces, the Now and Always pendant, features a distinctive facial image inspired by the many-faced goddesses of Horae within an aquamarine gemstone. His necklace Great Wall, made of diamond and jadeite, sold for $73.5 million in 2012. In 2026, marking his seventieth year, Chan turned to monumental sculpture with Vessels of Other Worlds, a dual exhibition of titanium works up to ten metres tall, curated by James Putnam and staged at the Chapel of Santa Maria della Pietà in Venice and the Long Museum West Bund in Shanghai.

== Wallace Cut ==
In 1987, he devised a method of carving designs within a gemstone. The technique uses cameos and intaglios to create a lifelike image. That image is then reflected within the gem to create a three-dimensional effect. A modified dentist's drill is used to make small detailed changes on the stone. Most of the designs are made under water to dissipate the heat generated by the high powered drill, to prevent damage to the material.
