= Jewellery design =

Art of designing and creating jewellery

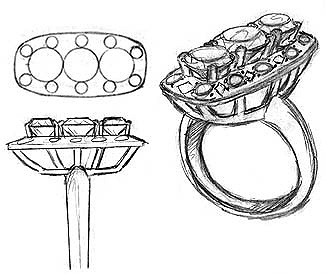
Rendering of a jewellery design before going to the jeweller's bench

Jewellery design is the art or profession of designing and creating jewellery. It is one of civilization's earliest forms of decoration, dating back at least 7,000 years to the oldest-known human societies in the Indus Valley, Mesopotamia, and Egypt. The art has taken many forms throughout the centuries, from the beadwork of ancient times to the metalworking and gem-cutting of the modern day.

Before an article of jewellery is created, design concepts are rendered, followed by detailed technical drawings generated by a jewellery designer, a professional who is trained in the architectural and functional knowledge of materials, fabrication techniques, composition, wearability, and market trends.

Traditional hand-drawing and drafting methods are still used in designing jewellery, particularly at the conceptual stage. However, a shift is taking place to computer-aided design programs (CAD). The traditionally hand-illustrated jewel is typically translated into wax or metal directly by a skilled craftsman, but a CAD model is generally used as the basis for a CNC cut or 3D printed 'wax' pattern to be used in the rubber moulding or lost wax casting processes.

Once planning is complete, the design is rendered and fabricated using the necessary materials for proper adaptation to the function of the object. For example, 24K gold was used in ancient jewellery design because it was more accessible than silver as source material. Before the first century, many civilizations also incorporated beads into jewellery. Once the discovery of gemstones and gem cutting became more readily available, the art of jewellery ornamentation and design shifted. The earliest documented gemstone cut was done by Theophilus Presbyter (c. 1070–1125), who practised and developed many applied arts and was a known goldsmith. Later, during the 14th century, medieval lapidary technology evolved to include cabochons and cameos.

Early jewellery design commissions were often made by nobility or the church to honour an event or as wearable ornamentation. Enamelling and repoussé became standard methods for creating ornamental wares to demonstrate wealth, position, or power. These early techniques created a specific complex design element that later led to the Baroque movement in jewellery design.

Throughout the 20th-century jewellery design underwent drastic and continual style changes: Art Nouveau (1900–1918), Art Deco (1919–1929), International Style & Organicism (1929–1946), New Look & Pop (1947–1967), Globalization, Materialism, and Minimalism.
