= Givenchy (disambiguation) =

Givenchy is a French fashion house.

Givenchy may also refer to:

- Parfums Givenchy, Givenchy's fragrance brand
- Hubert de Givenchy (1927-2018), French fashion designer, founder of Givenchy
- Jean-Claude de Givenchy (1925–2009), French-American perfumer, owner of Parfums Givenchy
- James de Givenchy (born 1963), American jewelry designer
- Suzi de Givenchy (born 1966), Hong Kong-French model

== Places ==
- Givenchy-en-Gohelle, France
- Givenchy-le-Noble, France
- Givenchy-lès-la-Bassée, France

== Others ==
- Battle of Givenchy (December 18-December 22, 1914)
- HMCS Givenchy
