= Jules Diéterle =

19th-century French architect

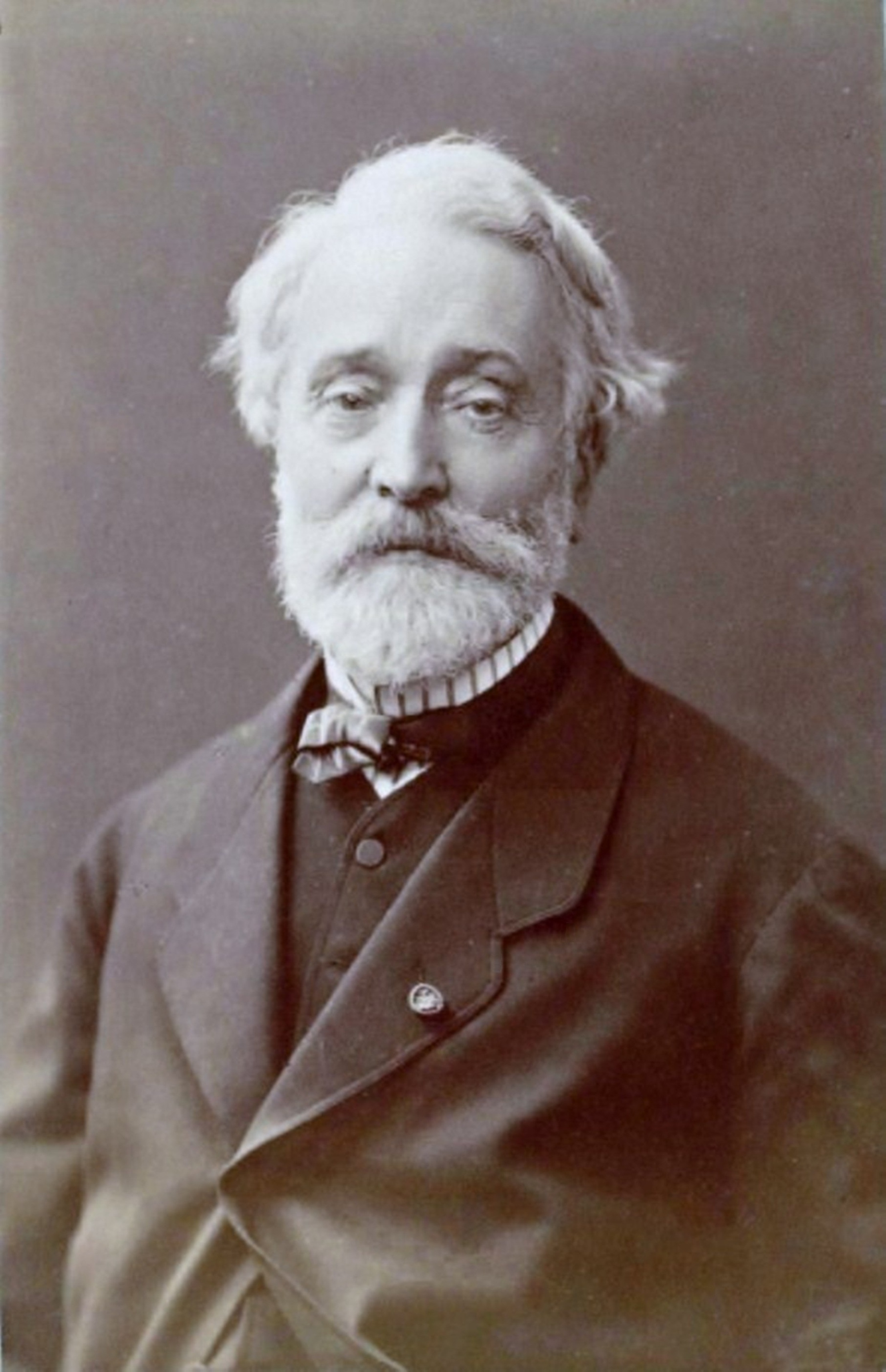
Jules Diéterle by Nadar, c. 1885.

Jules Diéterle (8 February 1811 – 22 April 1889) was a 19th-century French architect, also a draftsman, painter, painter on porcelain, sculptor and theatre decorator.

== Biography ==
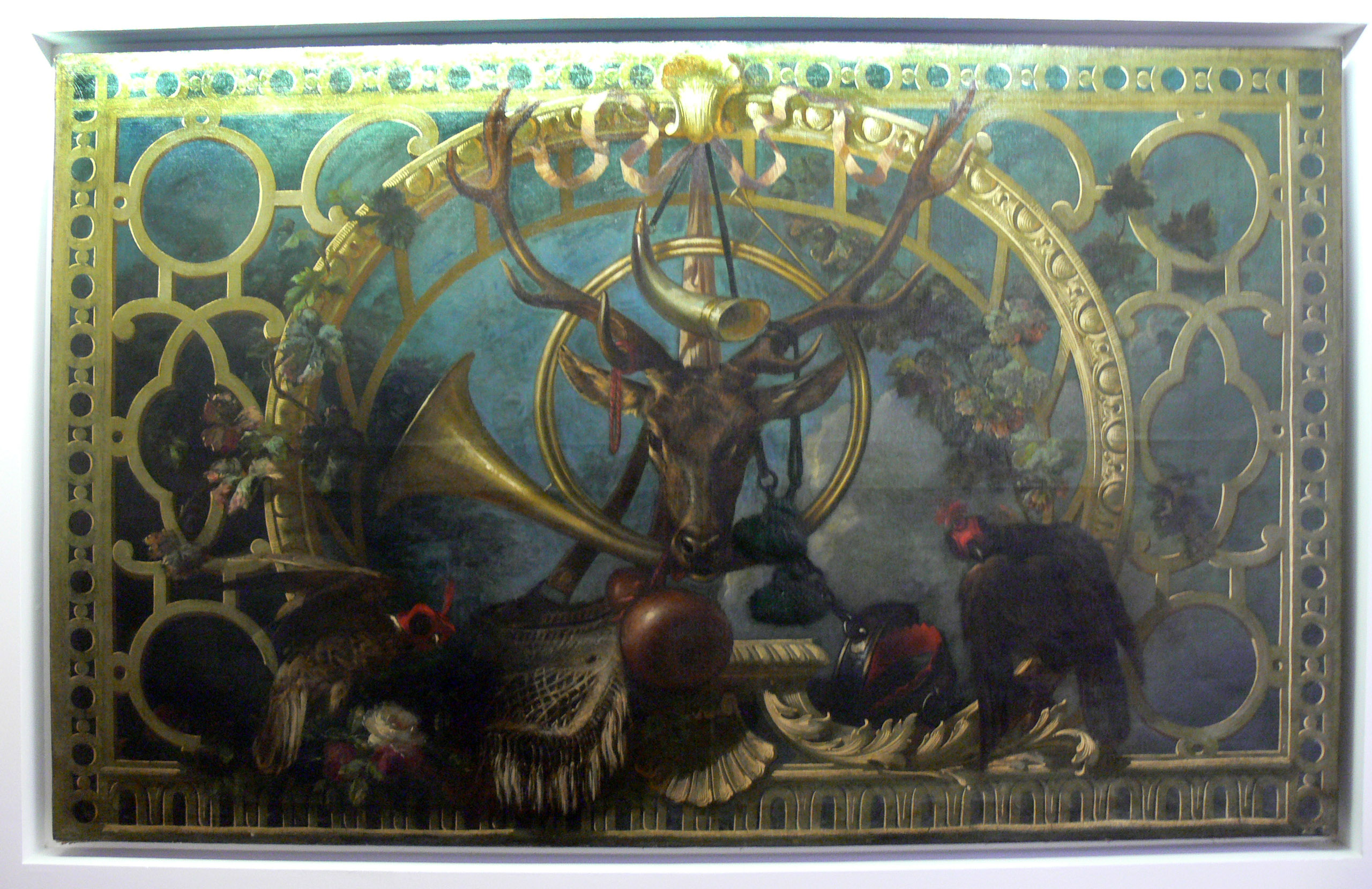
Hunting trophy, (dated 1892); carton de tapestry for the decoration of the Elysée Palace.

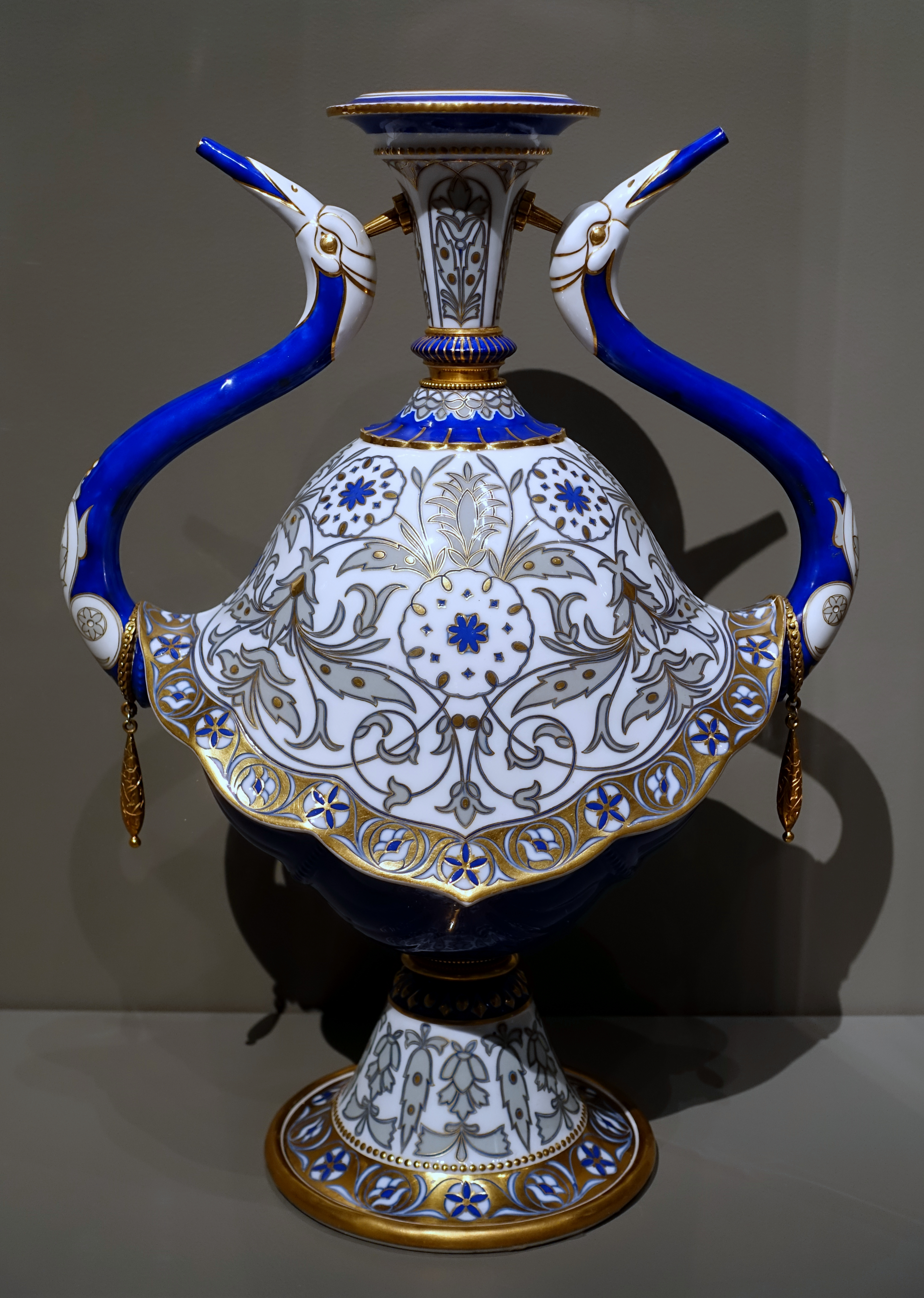
Aiguière, Sèvres porcelain, designed by Jules Diéterle (1854).

Born in Paris, Diéterle, son of Jean Georges Diéterle, (Note: Frenchized first names. They are Johann Georg Dieterle (without accent) or Dieterlen. Johann Georg Dieterle was born on 31 March 1774 in Baiersbronn, Ortslage Heselbach, Landkreis Freudenstadt, Baden-Württemberg, Germany. He applied for French citizenship twice: on 2 February 1833 and 15 July 1841. Source: Archives nationales, documents references, BB/11/344, file n°985 X2 and BB/11/450, file n°4537 X3.) piano maker, and Marie-Antoinette Terrasson (Note: Jean Georges Diéterle and Marie-Antoinette Terrasson were married in Paris on 25 Prairial year 11 (14 June 1803) and the religious ceremony took place at the Sainte-Marguerite church. The marriage contract was signed in front of Me Louis Claude Laisné on 21 June 1803 (year XI). Source: Archives nationales, cote document MC/ET/XXVIII/610. From this union were born in Paris: Marie Georgette Diéterle on 25 ventôse year 12 (16 March 1804), Charles Édouard Diéterle on 24 September 1807 and Jules Pierre Michel Diéterle on 8 February 1811.) born in Paris on 8 February 1811 was a very versatile artist. He started with the painter-decorator Hugues Martin, then joined the Dockain wallpaper factory, rue du Faubourg-Saint-Antoine in Paris.

Diéterle later joined Pierre-Luc-Charles Ciceri's workshop (1782-1868). In June 1832, he worked at the Paris Opera on the sets of La tentation, a five acts opéra-ballet by Jean Coralli. In 1833, with Charles Séchan (1803–1874), a student of Ciceri, he founded an association under the name Séchan et Diéterle. Léon Feuchère joined them, followed by Édouard Desplechin. From 1832 until 1848, his career as a decorator merged with those of his collaborators, but their association was dissolved in 1849. That last year, Diéterle restored the Galerie d'Apollon at the Louvre with Séchan.

At the same time, he entered the manufacture nationale de Sèvres as a master artist in 1840. From 1852 to 1855, he was head of art works. Diéterle had the Second French Empire as a sponsor and realized a service in a style called Pompeian for prince Napoleon.

Diéterle married on 2 May 1843 in Paris with Émilie Louise Honorine Gardie (Note: Émilie Louise Honorine Gardie was born in London on 21 July 1823. She was baptized at St James's Church, City of Westminster, on 28 December 1823. She died in the 9th arrondissement of Paris on 9 May 1874.) daughter of Jean Louis Gardie (Note: Jean Louis Gardie (1795–1880) was a merchant and bronzes manufacturer in London. He was going to part with Ann Nugent Woodger. On separation and divorce in England, see Women's rights in 19th century England: the struggle for rights in the private sphere. In France, a law authorizing divorce was promulgated in 1792 during the French Revolution and repealed in 1816 under the Bourbon Restoration. It was restored in 1884.) and Ann Nugent Woodger. (Note: Ann Nugent Woodger was a miniaturist painter. She had another daughter, Emma Augustine Gardie, born in the former 5th arrondissement of Paris on 19 October 1829, who married Louis Jules Haumont (1826–1906), an artist-painter, in the former 2nd arrondissement of Paris on 5 May 1851. Emma Augustine Gardie died in the 17th arrondissement of Paris on 27 March 1894.) From this union were born four children: Georges Pierre Diéterle on 25 March 1844, Louise Emma Diéterle on 20 August 1845, Charles Jules Diéterle on 6 April 1847 and Anne Marguerite Diéterle on 3 May 1853.

In 1848, he was president of the Higher Council for the Improvement of the Gobelins, Beauvais, and Sèvres manufactories. In 1852, Séchan and Diéterle went to Constantinople where they were responsible for carrying out the interior decorations in the Sultan Abdulmejid I palaces.

Séchan unofficially became Diéterle's "stepfather". Indeed, he lived in a marriage from 1851 with Ann Nugent Woodger, separated from her husband (Note: Ann Nugent Woodger was born on 24 September 1801 in London and baptized in St Martin-in-the-Fields, City of Westminster, on 12 July 1803. She married Jean Louis Gardie for the first time at St Mary's Church, Putney, London, on 21 January 1819. After her separation from her husband, she lived with Charles Séchan. However, the notion of effective marriage with Charles Séchan in the legal framework is not certain. To date, no marriage certificate has confirmed this thesis. The only mention on this subject is in the death certificate of Ann Nugent Woodger in 1871: "wife of Mr. Séchan Charles residing in Paris". Except, the death certificate of Charles Séchan dated 14 September 1874 in the 9th arrondissement of Paris (death certificate n°1131) indicates his status as a single person and not as a widower. His biographer, Adolphe Badin, mentions in the preface of the book Ch. Séchan décorateur de l'Opéra, souvenirs d'un homme de théâtre: The end of his life was saddened by the painful events of 1870–71, during which he courageously refused to leave Paris, despite his age and his already very shaky health. A special mourning, the death of the beloved companion of his life, was added to the national and political mourning; and, under these redoubled blows, the heart disease, whose germ he carried within him, took disturbing developments and ended up winning him over, after long and painful suffering, on 14 September 1874. Does Adolphe Badin mean by the term "companion", that of a wife or in a more neutral way, the one who lives in a conjugal relationship with a spouse, without being married to him? Charles Séchan and Ann Nugent Woodger never married, simply because she was probably not divorced from her British husband. Ann Nugent Woodger died in the middle of the Franco-Prussian War, far from the capital, then besieged and bombarded by the Prussians, on 18 January 1871 at Dol-de-Bretagne where she had been living for some time, at the Grande Maison hotel located on Grande Rue (mentions in death certificate n°15). She was buried on 12 March 1872 at Montmartre Cemetery, 18th arrondissement of Paris, in the Séchan vault.) and mother of Émilie Louise Honorine Gardie.

Édouard Bénazet (1801–1867), a French businessman, fermier des jeux and successor in this capacity to his father Jacques Bénazet (1778–1848) (Note: In 1836, under the July Monarchy, games were prohibited in France. Jacques Bénazet (1778–1848), a financier, owned the Paris games farm and was forced to look for a new place, left for Baden-Baden. He obtained a concession for a casino in Germany in 1838.) entrusted Séchan, Diéterle and his brother-in-law, Louis Jules Haumont, with the decoration of the four lounges of the casino, nicknamed the "Maison de Conversation" in Baden-Baden in 1853.

Diéterle was made a chevalier of the Légion d'honneur on 14 August 1852, before being promoted an officer on 15 July 1867.

Diéterle and his friend, judge François-Alexandre Metzinger (Note: François-Alexandre Metzinger, was born in Paris on 9 January 1813 and married Alexandrine Françoise Gaudelet in Paris on 17 June 1865. He was the President of Chamber at the Imperial Court in Paris and a member of the Municipal Council of Croissy-sur-Seine. With the advent of the French Third Republic in September 1870 and the German invasion, he left Paris for the department of Seine-Inférieure. Three months after the collapse of the Second French Empire, Metzinger died in his residence in Yport on 20 December 1870.) stayed in Yport in 1856 at the Tougard Hotel. Under the charm of the Normandy coast, they returned the following years with a few friends such as Jean-Paul Laurens, Julien Gorgeu (Parisian banker, mayor of Yport) and Alfred Nunès (Parisian bank clerk, cousin of the painter Camille Pissarro, mayor of Yport).

In 1863, he built the villa "Les Charmilles" in Yport, while his eldest son Georges Diéterle, moved to a farm in 1870 in Criquebeuf-en-Caux, "La ferme des roses". During the Franco-Prussian War, Jules Diéterle's mother, Marie-Antoinette Terrasson, took refuge in Yport. (Note: Mention written in the marriage certificate of Marie-Antoinette Terrasson's second son, Charles Édouard Diéterle (Paris 24 September 1807 – Paris 25 August 1875) married in second marriage in Paris in the 9th arrondissement of Paris, with Louise Athalie Hermier, on 5 November 1870.) During the Siege of Paris the capital was then surrounded by German troops and many inhabitants fled the city. In July 1872, the painter Camille Corot stayed with the Diéterle family in Yport and Criquebeuf-en-Caux. Upon the death of Diéterle, the villa in Yport was sold to the landscape painter and portraitist Albert Fourié (1854–1937).

In 1876, Diéterle became a director of the Beauvais Manufactory and then president of the Union centrale des arts décoratifs. He resigned in 1882 for health reasons.

Diéterle died on 22 April 1889 in his home at 68 rue Pierre-Charron in the 8th arrondissement of Paris.

== Family ==
Among Diéterle's descendants are many artists, including his daughter, Marguerite Diéterle, who married Jules Badin from Châtel-Censoir, painter and director of the Gobelins and Beauvais manufacturies. His great-grandson Hubert de Givenchy is one of the most important couturiers of the 20th century.

Another of his children is the draughtsman, painter and architect, Georges Diéterle (1844–1937), and one of Jules Diéterle's granddaughters is Yvonne Diéterle (1882–1974), sculptor and painter, wife of Jean-Pierre Laurens, also a painter.

His other son was Charles Diéterle (1847-1933), a painter, husband of Marie Van Marcke de Lummen called Marie Diéterle (1856-1935), a painter.

== Works ==
Drawings and paintings

- Drawing of a Renaissance palace, with loggia and stairs: pencil on paper (37.5 x 60.3 cm), sold by Sotheby's London 13 April 1992<.
- Oil on canvas entitled "Hunting Trophy" (dated 1892); tapestry carton for the decoration of the Élysée Palace; housed at the Mobilier National in 1892, transferred to the Roubaix Museum (inventory number: 6103-1086-5)
- Portrait of a sitting woman (oil on canvas, 107 x 73 cm), signed and dated 1874, sold by Christophe Joron-Derem 8 November 2006.

"Objets d'art" from French public collections.

- " Vase Diéterle ", or et couleurs
- " Vase Rimini "
- " Vase de Chantilly " : nouvelles de la Guerre
- " Service Pompéien " du Prince Napoléon
- " Paire de vases Ly »
- " Coupe de Rivoli ", fond céladon, décor or et couleurs
- " Vase à quatre lobes ", d'une paire, fond bleu, riche décor en or de style persan
- " Pièces pour le service pompéien du prince Napoléon "; à fond rouge pompéien
- " Paire de vases Rimini " à anses en forme de serpent
- " Vase Diéterle " élément d'une paire à fond céladon et décor or avec fleurs peintes

== Bibliography ==
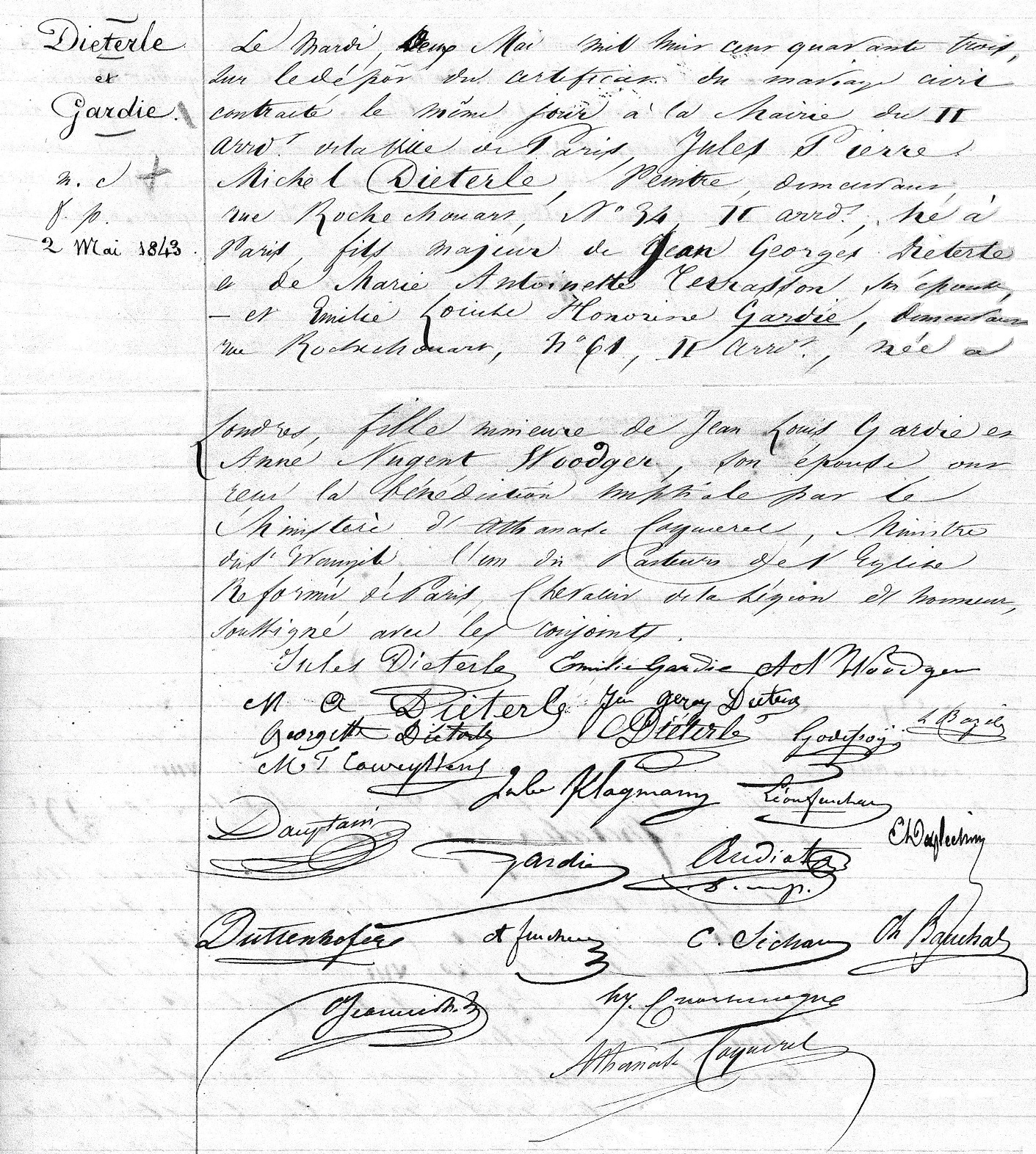
Protestant marriage certificate of Jules Diéterle and Émilie Gardie in Paris, 2 May 1843. The wedding blessing was celebrated by Athanase Laurent Charles Coquerel, a pastor of the Reformed Church of France.

- Join-Diéterle, Catherine; Desjardins, Marie-Hélène; Levert, Florence (1999). Les Diéterle, une famille d'artistes (in French). Fécamp: Collection des catalogues des Musées municipaux de Fécamp. p. 99. ISBN 978-2-90885-822-8.
- Join-Diéterle, Catherine (January 1988). Les Décors de scène de l'Opéra de Paris à l'époque romantique (in French). Paris: Éditions Picard. p. 295. ISBN 978-2-70840-363-5.
- Wild, Nicole (26 November 2014). "Décorateurs et Costumiers : Diéterle Jules Pierre Michel". Décors et costumes du XIXe siècle; Théâtre et décorateurs. Arts du spectacle (in French). Vol. 2. Paris: Éditions de la Bibliothèque nationale de France. p. 381. ISBN 978-2-71771-888-1.
- Séchan, Charles (1883). Ch. Séchan décorateur de l'Opéra; Souvenirs d'un homme de théâtre, 1831–1855 recueillis par Adolphe Badin (in French). Paris: Éditions Calmann-Lévy. p. 342.

== Notes and references ==
=== External links ===
- Jules Pierre Diéterlé at Drouot
- "Jules Diéterle (1811–1889)". l'Agence photographique de la Réunion des musées nationaux (in French).
