= Jules Badin =

French painter (1843 - 1919)

- Born: Jean Ernest Jules Badin
- Occupations: Businessman, painter
- Spouse: Marguerite Dieterle

Jean Ernest Jules Badin (23 June 1843 – 5 June 1919), colloquially Jean-Jules Badin, was a French painter, portraitist and businessman who was most notably the owner and director of the Beauvais Manufactory, one of the most important tapestry factories in France, which he inherited from his father.

== Life ==
Badin was born 23 June 1843 in Paris to Pierre-Adolphe Badin (1805–1878), of Auxerre, and Julie Edmée Badin (née Roth). He was a student at Beaux-Arts de Paris where he was a student under Alexandre Cabanel and Paul Baudry. He took part in several exhibitions starting in 1873.

In 1882, Badin succeeded his predeceased father as the director of the Beauvais Manufactory, a position which he held until 1913.

== Family ==
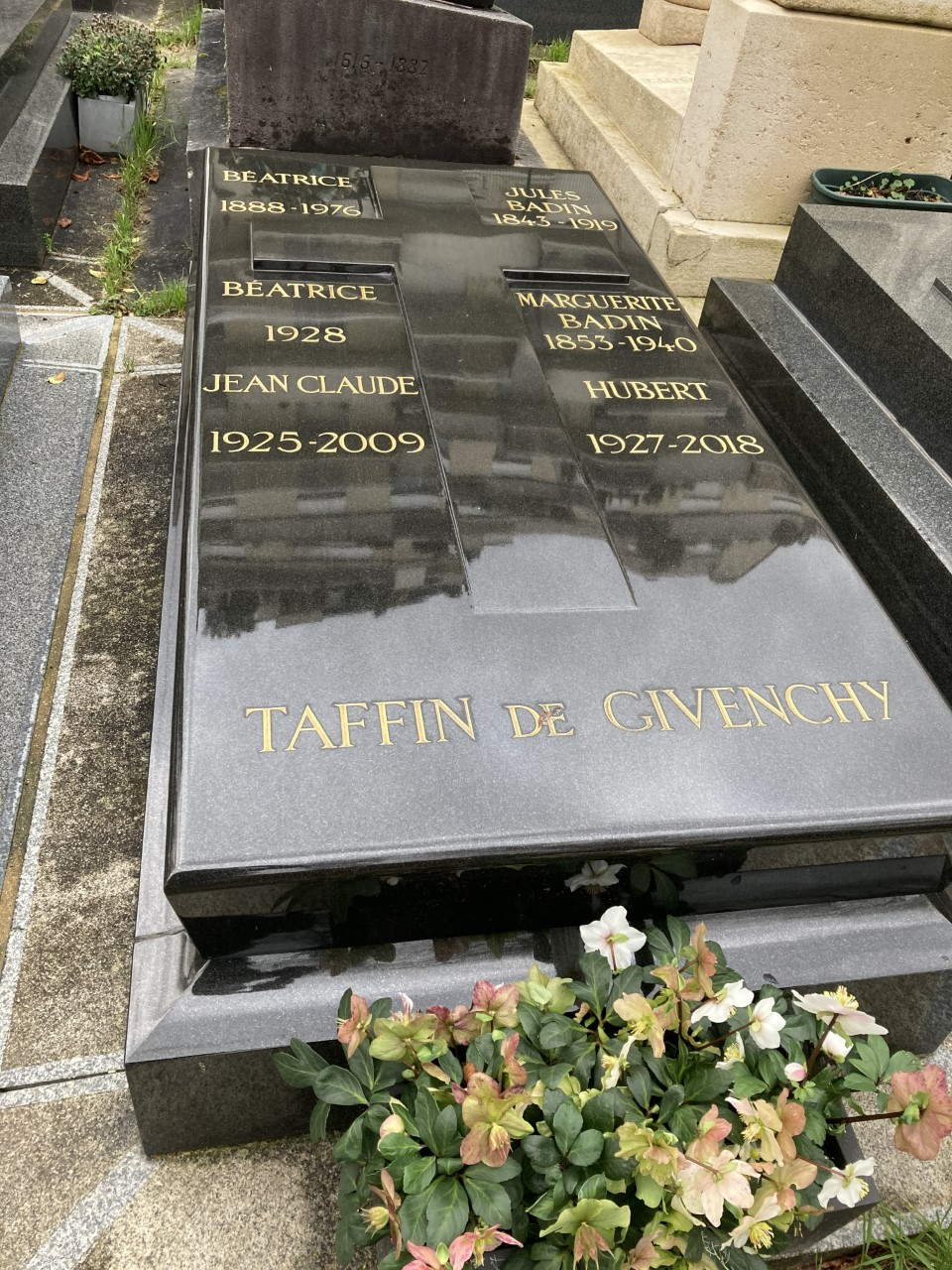
Givenchy grave on Passy Cemetery

He was married to Anne Marguerite Diéterle (1853–1940) with whom he had six children;

- Émile Badin (born 1880)
- Aimée Badin (1882–1972)
- Pierre Badin (born circa 1885)
- Edmée Badin (born circa 1885)
- Marguerite Jeanne Béatrice Badin (1888–1976), married to Count Jean Charles Lucien Taffin de Givenchy (1888–1930), with whom she had two sons; Hubert de Givenchy, founder of Givenchy, and Jean-Claude de Givenchy, a former Air France executive and president of Parfums Givenchy.
- Jacques Badin (1894–1972)

Badin died in 1919 aged 75. He was buried at Passy Cemetery.
