= Philippe Venet =

French fashion designer (1929–2021)

- Born: May 23, 1929; Lyon, France
- Died: February 22, 2021 (aged 91); Neuilly-sur-Seine, France
- Occupation: Fashion designer
- Years active: 1951–1994
- Known for: Founder of the House of Philippe Venet; Recipient of the Dé d'or (1985)
- Partner: Hubert de Givenchy

Philippe Venet (23 May 1929 – 22 February 2021) was a French fashion designer.

== Early life and career ==
Venet was born in Lyon, France. After training at the École Professionnelle des Tailors de Lyon he apprenticed at age 14 with "a local dressmaker, Pierre Court, who was authorized to reproduce Balenciaga designs."

In 1951, Venet moved to Paris and worked as a cutter at Schiaparelli. While there, he met Hubert de Givenchy, following him when established his own label two years later. Venet served as head cutter at Givenchy until 1962 when he also went solo. At his own brand, he "dressed the social set and 'all the Kennedy ladies,' as one reporter put it, infused conservative clothes with a youthful spirit."

According to Olivier Gabet, director of the Musée des Arts Décoratifs, Paris, Venet's clients included arts patron Hélène David-Weill, actress Jacqueline Delubac and American society figures Mica Ertegun, Jayne Wrightsman and Marina Kellen French.

== Personal life ==
He was the lover of Hubert de Givenchy. According to James Taffin de Givenchy, Givenchy's nephew, "As Monsieur Hubert de Givenchy’s lifelong partner, he helped to build the house into an international force in fashion, and his many contributions remain an essential part of our DNA."

Venet died at the American Hospital of Paris on 22 February 2021 at age 91.
