= Fanny Marc =

French sculptor (1858–1937)

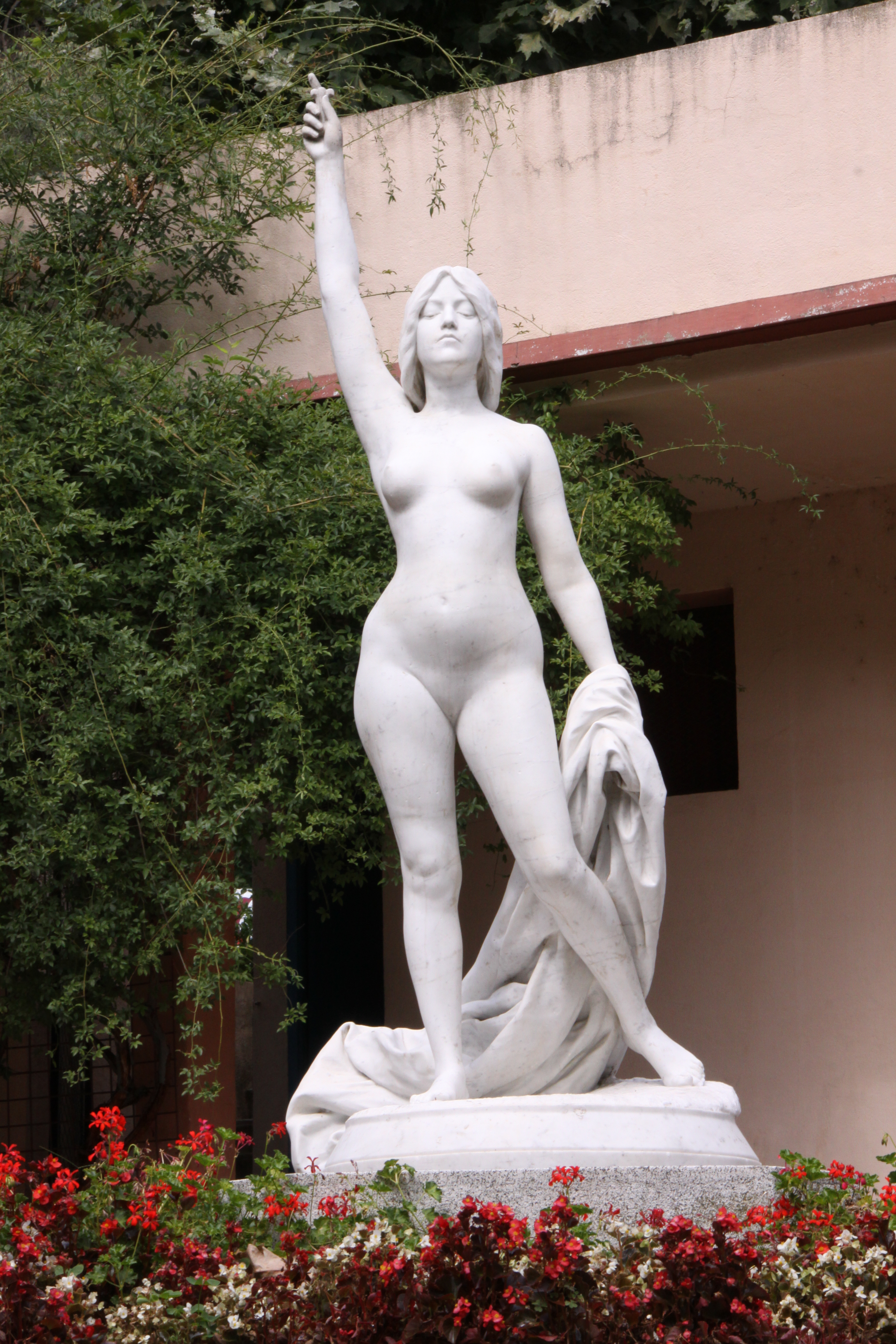
La Vérité Sortant du Puits (Truth Coming Out of the Well) by Fanny Marc in Amélie-les-Bains-Palalda

Fanny Marc (1858–1937) was a French sculptor. She was born Estelle Odile Fanny Legendre on May 22, 1858, in Paris and lived in La Ferté-sous-Jouarre, where a street, rue Fanny Marc, is named for her.

Marc studied under sculptors Alexandre Falguière, Louis-Ernest Barrias and Georges Lemaire, and exhibited a sculpture group at the Grand Palais in 1904, at the annual show of the Union of Women Painters and Sculptors. This work was judged "among the best of the sculptures" at the exhibit by The Times of London. She was awarded the third-place medal in 1904, and second place in 1906.

For avoiding clichés in Biblical subjects Marc was called "a lady sculptor of genius" in a 1912 inventory of French sculptors by Henry Heathcote Statham in which she and Yvonne Diéterle where the only two women.

Fanny Marc died on May 1, 1937.

== Works ==
- Jésus sur la prière, c. 1904
- The Expulsion of Adam and Eve from the Garden of Eden, 1906
- Death of Abel
- La Vérité Sortant du Puits, l'Ancien Théâtre de Verdure, Amélie-les-Bains-Palalda
- Narcissus and Echo, jardin Bossuet, Meaux
- Monument to the dead of 1870, La Ferté-sous-Jouarre
- Nymph and her child
