= Yvonne Diéterle =

French sculptor & painter (1882–1974)

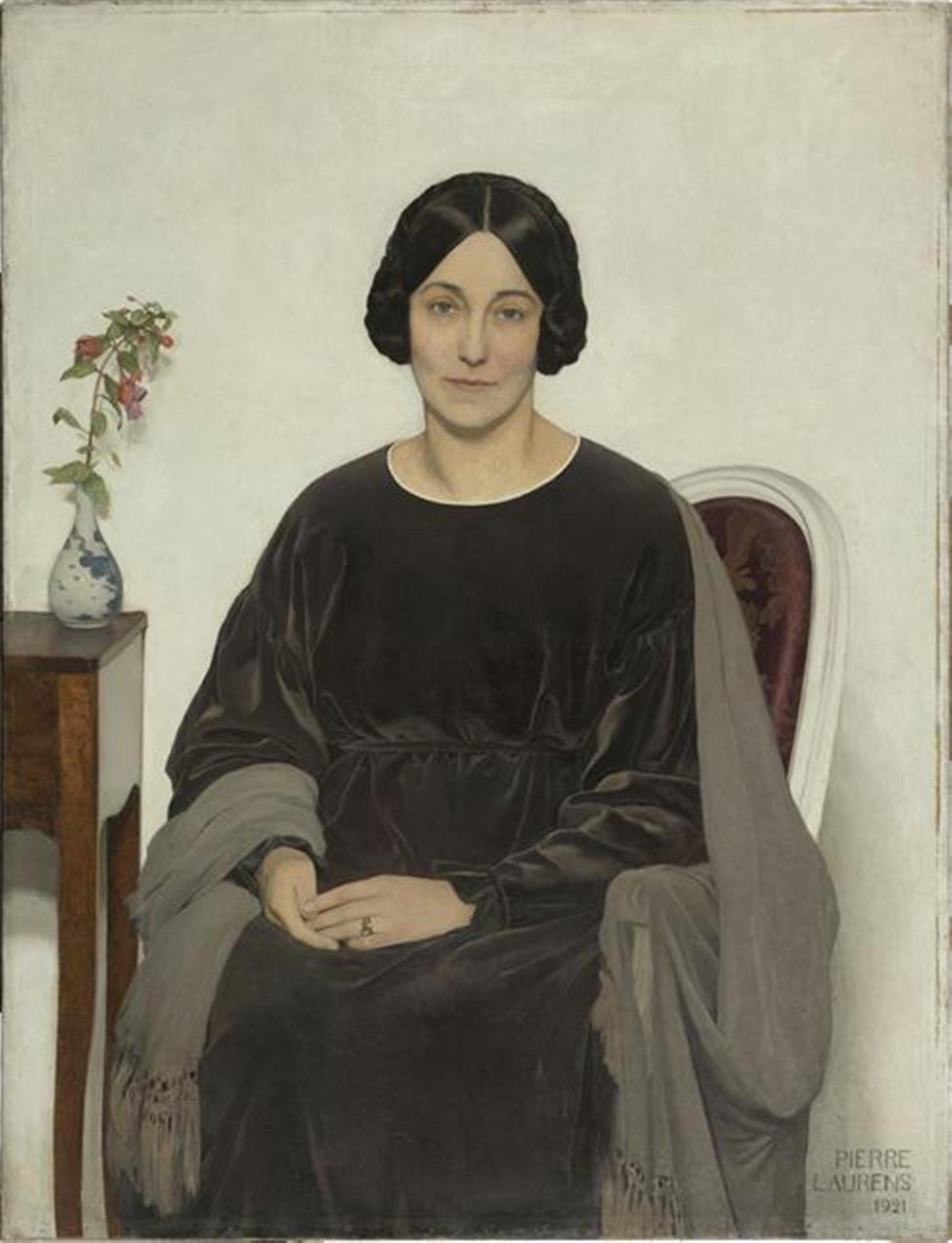
- A portrait of Yvonne Diéterle by her husband, Jean-Pierre Laurens (1921), in the collection of Centre Pompidou
- Born: 7 March 1882; 9th arrondissement of Paris, France
- Died: 23 November 1974 (aged 92); Fontenay-aux-Roses
- Spouse: Jean-Pierre Laurens

Yvonne Emma Diéterle (1882–1974) was a sculptor and painter from Paris. She was known as Yvonne Diéterle-Laurens after her marriage.

== Biography ==
Diéterle was from a family of artists; her grandfather was Jules Diéterle. She first studied art with her father, then at the École Duperré, where her teachers included Fernand Pelez.

She first exhibited artwork at the Paris Salon in 1899, when she was only 17 years old. Her talent as a portrait painter led to her 1903 induction into the Société des Artistes Français, when she was 21.

In a 1912 inventory of French sculptors by the Royal Institute of British Architects, she and Fanny Marc were the only two women. The author of the inventory, Henry Heathcote Statham, judged her Sommeil as one of the best works of the Salon of 1903. This sculpture is now in the Beaux-Arts museum of Rouen.

Diéterle directed the creation of the frescos and stained glass windows in the Notre-Dame-du-Calvaire church in the Paris suburb of Châtillon, Hauts-de-Seine in the 1920s and 1930s.

She painted a portrait of singer Marya Freund, who was hiding in Diéterle's home, fleeing the Nazi occupation of France.
