= Ludwig Mestler =

Ludwig Mestler (1891–1959) was an artist in Austria before the Anschluss and then later in the United States. While not a major artist, he was an innovator, creating a new style of watercolor painting.

== History ==
Ludwig Mestler was born in Vienna on August 25, 1891, to Joseph and Jenny Kuten Mestler. His father was a choir singer in the Imperial Opera House (now called the Vienna State Opera), where he sang under Gustav Mahler, and also in Vienna's oldest synagogue. As a child Ludwig became devoted to both art and music but, acceding to his parents' that he should receive professional training, after finishing Realschule in 1910, he proceeded to Technische Universität Wien from which he graduated in 1916 an Engineer Architect, the equivalent of a Masters of Architecture.

After three years of military service, during which he rose to the rank of first lieutenant engineer, he worked as a professional engineer for seven years, during which period his pay rose from $19.00 a week to $80.00 a week. He immigrated to the US on February 11, 1923, on the Steam Ship Hanover. In 1927, he became a registered architect in New York state.

On August 14 of the same year he married Miss Wilma Allerhand. This marriage resulted in stress on both sides, and three years later Mestler left his wife to take a job outside New York City. They never reunited. In 1932 Mestler brought action for annulment of their marriage which was granted in 1934.

The Depression following the stock market crash of 1929 made it difficult for Mestler to obtain employment, and this he took as a sign that the time had come for him to give up his architectural career, for which he never cared, and to do what he had always longed to do by exclusively devoting himself to art.

After becoming a US citizen on March 16, 1931, he decide to return to his native Austria where the money he had saved during his years as an architect would last him longer. Back in his homeland, he applied himself industriously to the study of etching, drawing and painting. He studied under Arthur Paunzen and for three years at the Akademie der Bildenden Kunste in Vienna, where in his last year, 37–38, he worked successfully under Karl Sterrer in the Meisterschule fur Malerei. He also found time for travel and took a Mediterranean cruise in addition to seeing much of Austria and Italy. These were productive years producing many sketches, watercolors and etchings.

An etching of this period, "A View of Sievering", gave him his first recognition in the United States as it was included in the 4th International Exhibition of Etching and Engraving at the Chicago Art Institute. It later toured the country in a museum exhibition of the nation's best etching. In Austria he acquired an avid collector in Dr. Fritz Eisenberger, an art historian, who bought some twenty watercolors and one or more copies of all the etching Mestler produced in Austria. He had a one-man show in Vienna in 1936.

Judengasse Street, watercolor 1933 by Ludwig Mestler

The advent of Hitler to Austria brought Mestler back to the United States on the SS New York. This time he settled in the Boston area, first in Brookline and later in Cambridge. Throwing himself wholeheartedly into the practice of art, this was a productive period for him. It was at this time that he developed his highly individualistic parallel stroke technique in watercolor. His work was represented in a number of art exhibits, and he had two one man shows: one at the Worcester Art Museum in 1939 and one at Boston's Symphony Hall in 1941. Etchings were purchased by several leading museums and many private collectors. Despite this success, Ludwig Mestler was unable to support himself at his art. Not only was he temperamentally unsuited to supplementing his income by teaching or lecturing, but he developed ideas about the value of his pictures which made it impossible to sell them. For instance, a friend relates that he indignantly turned down an offer by the Boston Museum of Fine Arts to buy one of his watercolors for $250.00.

A temporary solution to his financial problem was provided by the WPA art project which employed him for two years. When that work ceased, illness ensued and he had his first experience as the recipient of charity – first through a private and later a public organization. Friends pulled strings and got him a position with Stone and Webster.

This proved one of the pivotal points in his life, comparing work at a job he disliked to receiving public relief, as he had done for the first time the year before, he gave up the latter and resigned from Stone and Webster after only three months. He never worked at another job or paid income tax again. It was at this time he began to feel an interest in music.

He didn't know music theory at the time. He acquired a music library through friends and plunged into the study of harmony and counterpoint. He struggled alone with this for years only gradually gaining the attention and interest of local professors, top men in their field, who helped him over some of the more difficult hurdles in his musical education.

Song cycles and various small pieces of chamber music began to emerge and he found student musician glad to perform them for him. The apathy regarding his music began to dissolve. He wrote in 1958, "Musicians start to take to my work – resistance is diminishing visibly." He began making mastersheets.

In 1958 he had the satisfaction of having a student recital of his work at the Longy School in Cambridge devoted entirely to his work.

However, in the opinion of many who knew him, Ludwig Mestler's talent as an artist was far greater than his talent as a composer. And while he continued to sketch, make pencil portraits and experiment with oils, he stopped producing watercolors.

The Board of Welfare was willing to pay for his regular expenses but not for private vacations in the country. Private charitable organizations, on several occasions, made it possible for him to convalesce in the country after illness and several friends turned over cottages in the mountains or the seaside. But such experiences were infrequent and year sometimes followed year before he was able to get out of the city again. In 1958 he wrote, "I long to return to Nature, then I could paint again."

To Mestler, the freedom from non-artistic toil which relief money gave him was highly important and he would become furious with friends who tried to find him jobs. Yet he paid a high price for acceptance of public charity, for it placed him in a humble, often humiliating position which his sensitive nature often found intolerable. As years wore on, he became increasingly unhappy and embittered, and more and more governed by feelings of frustration, futility and failure, seeing slights and rebuffs where none existed.

In June 1955 he wrote in his diary, a series of draft letters mostly never sent, "I am very depressed over my hopeless situation in life." In November 1957 he confided,"…I feel…utterly lost and isolated. All my efforts in obeying the demands nature have been in vain and there is nowhere, even a trace of an indication that things will turn for the better. All I can hope, later on, my for will speak for me and explain me in the heart and brain of a very few people at a time when I will not know it any more."

In the winter of 1958-59 Ludwig Mestler fell on the ice, hitting his head. Late in February he was taken to Beth Israel Hospital, apparently suffering from brain injury. On March 20 he died there and through the offices of the Hebrew Free Burial Society was laid to rest in the Mount Lebanon Cemetery in West Roxbury. He is buried in the section Shara Tfilo. Friends took up a collections to provide a headstone for this strange, gentle, persistent man of art and music.

== From His Journals ==
Great Pleasure: "Matisse has great maturity, and the temper of the eternal pupil, he is always willing to learn anyhow, anywhere, and from anyone." Leo Stein, Appreciation: Painting, Poetry and Prose.

Complicated Life: We have allowed our life to become exceedingly complicated. But even now it is still possible to find, here and there an individual that loves simplicity and tries, whenever he can to eliminate or reduce complicated and replace it with simple. This task in itself is complicated, or should I say, complex, and yet again simple, because it means as often to avoid things, or methods, as to use other things or other methods. Ludwig Mestler 15. IX. 1957

== Critical Responses ==
An interview with Arthur Polonsky concerning the three man show he shared with Ludwig Mestler:

"They had a three-man show, at that time, which must have been in the early fall of 1948, I was one of the three artists and a man named Ludwig Mestler, who was . . . an older European artist who had settled in the Boston area, not well known, and Panos Ghikas. But each one of us represented an obviously different approach in painting. Ghikas was in what was then considered to be a geometric or abstract style, and Mestler, representational, but very much personalized, somewhat close to Lyonel Feininger, Klee; kind of quiet, small format, beautifully drawn, and so on. . And my work which I suppose seemed to some to be at least characteristic, if not typical, of what was going on then among some of the people emerging, for example, from the Museum School, Boston artists of a younger age. A 3-man show. It was widely reported, the show. It got into Art News, for example, in New York, with serious and lengthy reviews."

== Legacy ==
When the garret room he occupied for the last three and a half years of his life was examined after his death, the walls were lined with stacks of fruit crates containing his extensive library and most of the floor was covered with packing crates full of most of a lifetime's artistic output.

While there has been some discussion about his mental health, it seems to exist as a misguided approach to selling his work to an increasingly superficial and uneducated market. Commentary on his journals points to a highly educated person who just happened to be in an unfortunate situation for most of his life in the US.

His work now hangs in the National Gallery in Washington, D.C. and the Hirshhorn Gallery, which is an extension of the Smithsonian Institution. While not a member of any of the major movements of the 20th century, the fingerprints of his influence can be seen in the work of artists as diverse as R. Crumb and Alexis Covato. Like many people uprooted or destroyed by the Nazi Occupation of Europe, his life and memory were nearly lost.

Quoting Mestler, "I came to America in steerage class and remained in steerage ever since."

== Collectors ==
Private collectors of Ludwig Mestler's work as recorded in his journals between 1954 through 1958.

Francis Henry Taylor, Director of the Metropolitan Museum of Art 1940–1955.

Dr. Phil Fritz Eisenberger (graduate art historian) of Vienna purchased about 20 watercolors painted in Austria between the years 1934 through 1937 directly from the artist.

Perry B. Cott, chief curator of the National Gallery of Art Washington DC.

Professor. Victor Polatschek, first clarinetist of the Boston Symphony Orchestra and formerly a member of the Vienna Philharmonic.

Paul J. Sachs (1878–1965), Professor of Fine Arts at Harvard and associate director of the Fogg Art Museum.

Professor Dr. Eric Voegelin (1901-1985 Born in Cologne, Germany), studied at the University of Vienna, where he became a professor of political science in the Faculty of Law. In 1938, he and his wife, fleeing Hitler, immigrated to the United States. They became American citizens in 1944. Voegelin spent much of his career at Louisiana State University, the Ludwig-Maximilians-Universität München, and the Hoover Institution at Stanford University.

Henry L. Seaver, Professor of the department of Architecture, Harvard, Cambridge MA. Art Historian.

Frederick B. Deknatel was a member of Harvard's Department of Fine Arts for 40 years.

Laura M. Huntsinger, Author of "Harvard Portraits".

Lee M. Friedman, Author of "Three centuries of American Jewish history in Massachusetts".
