= Bettina Graziani =

French fashion model (1925–2015)

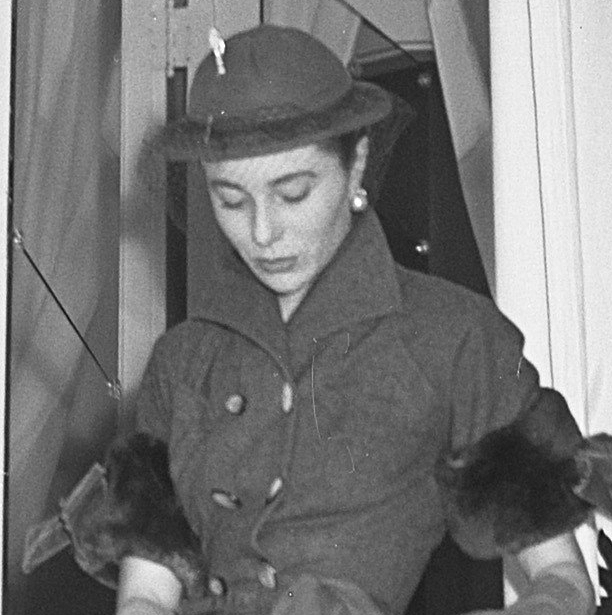
- Graziani in 1950
- Born: Simone Micheline Bodin; 8 May 1925; France
- Died: 3 March 2015 (aged 89); Paris, France
- Occupation: Fashion model
- Spouse: Gilbert Graziani

Simone Micheline Bodin (8 May 1925 – 3 March 2015), known professionally as Bettina or Bettina Graziani, was a French fashion model of the 1940s and 1950s and an early muse to the fashion designer Hubert de Givenchy. She was a designer of knitwear and, later, a poet and composer.

== Biography ==
Born in France, Simone Micheline Bodin was described as "a freckle-faced rail worker's daughter from Brittany" before becoming a model. She was renamed and recreated by Jacques Fath, who told her "We already have a Simone; you look to me like a Bettina." Bodin was invited by Christian Dior to join his fashion house which she refused, choosing instead to work for Fath.

Bodin became one of the century's first supermodels, rivalled in the 1940s only by Barbara Goalen. She was associated with Lucien Lelong and Jacques Fath, but most importantly with Hubert de Givenchy, for whom she worked as a model and press agent. Givenchy named his first collection, which debuted in 1952, after her. One of his designs, the Byronesque "Bettina blouse", became a fashion icon in the early 1950s and inspired the bottle for the best-selling Givenchy perfume Amarige.

After a short marriage to Gilbert "Benno" Graziani (1922–2018), a French photographer and reporter, she became the companion of Peter Viertel, the American screenwriter. Later she was the fiancée of Prince Aly Khan, son of the Aga Khan III, who briefly was the United Nations ambassador from Pakistan.

She retired from modeling in 1955, after meeting Aly Khan. In 1960, Bettina, then pregnant with their child, survived the car accident that took the life of the prince; the shock of the accident later resulted in a miscarriage. After Khan's death, Bettina wrote the autobiography Bettina par Bettina. She died at age 89 in 2015.
