= La Ferté-sous-Jouarre =

- Commune
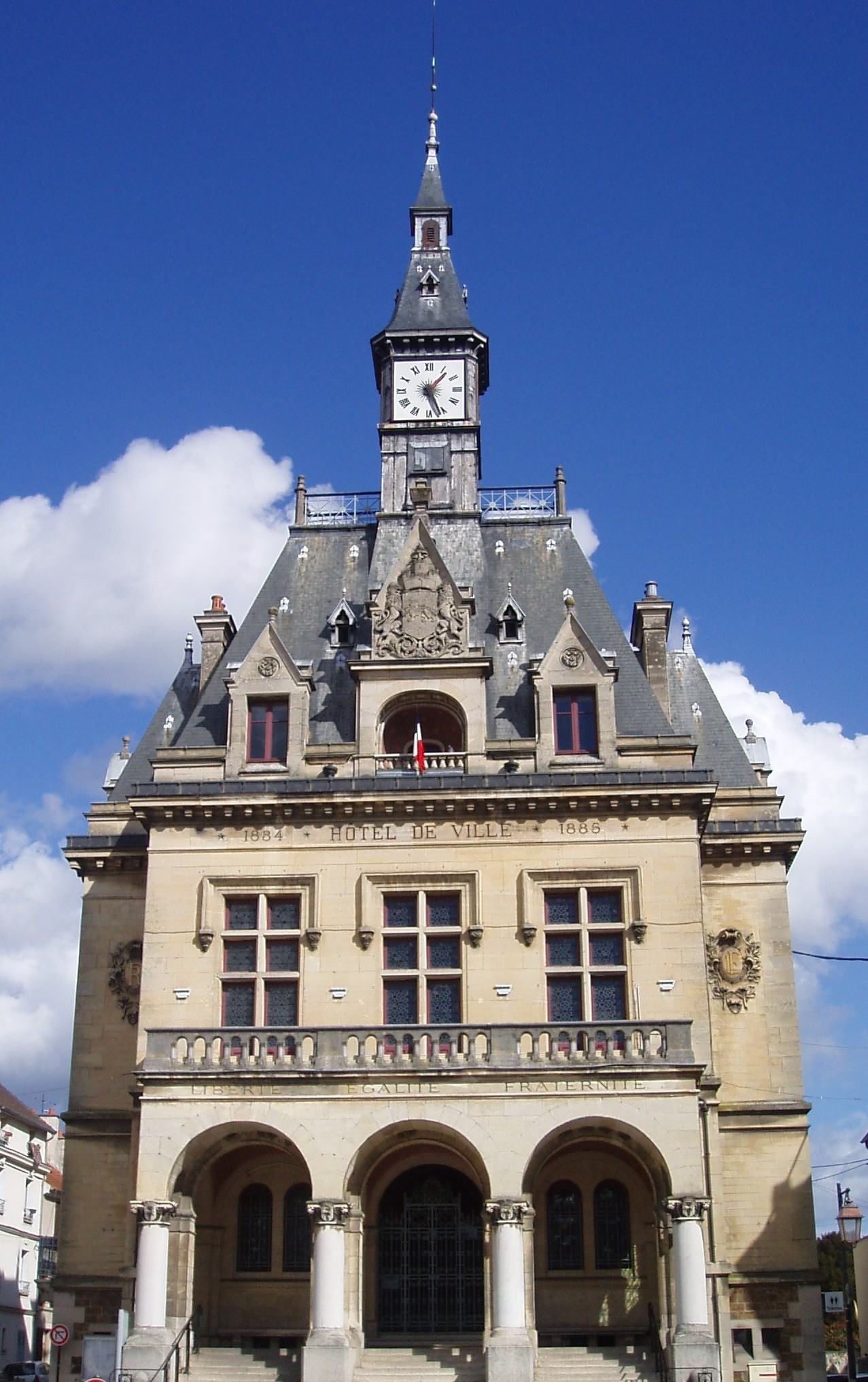
- Town hall

- Coat of arms
- Location of La Ferté-sous-Jouarre
- Location within France Location within Île-de-France (region)
- Coordinates: 48°56′59″N 3°07′49″E
- Country: France
- Region: Île-de-France
- Department: Seine-et-Marne
- Arrondissement: Meaux
- Canton: La Ferté-sous-Jouarre
- Intercommunality: CA Coulommiers Pays de Brie

Government
  - Mayor (2020–2026): Ugo Pezzetta
- Area^{1}: 10.06 km^{2} (3.88 sq mi)
- Highest elevation: 181 m (594 ft)
- Lowest elevation: 50 m (160 ft)
- Population (2023): 10,254
  - Density: 1,019/km^{2} (2,640/sq mi)
- Time zone: UTC+01:00 (CET)
  - Summer (DST): UTC+02:00 (CEST)
- INSEE/Postal code: 77183 /77260
- ^{1} French Land Register data, which excludes lakes, ponds, glaciers > 1 km^{2} (0.386 sq mi or 247 acres) and river estuaries.

La Ferté-sous-Jouarre (French: [la fɛʁte su ʒwaʁ]) is a commune in the Seine-et-Marne département in the Île-de-France region in north-central France. It is located approximately 40 miles (64 km) east of Paris.

It is located at a crossing point over the river Marne between Meaux and Château-Thierry.

== History ==
This area of France has frequently been a site of warfare. In 1819, British naval officer, Norwich Duff (1792–1862), Edinburgh born, recorded a note on La Ferté. The Bourbon Restoration had apparently dampened the Napoleonic road building boom, as evidenced by unused milestones. Construction projects had rebuilt some facilities destroyed in the wars with Britain and other Powers.

La Ferté is famous for millstones used for milling flour. Some have even been found in England.

...left Meaux a little before seven and, after passing through a fine country for five leagues, arrived at La Ferté-sous-Jouarre, a neat little town on the banks of the rivers Marne and Morin, where we breakfasted. This town supplies the greatest part of France with mile stones, which are considered the finest in Europe. The banks of the river and each side of the road were covered with them as we passed...The road from La Ferté to Château-Thierry (seven leagues) is very hilly but the scenery very fine. [We] passed three bridges over the Marne now rebuilt that were blown up on the advance of the Allies in 1813. [1814]

Among notable residents, the artist Émile Bayard was born in this town (1837). The Irish avant-garde writer, dramatist, poet and nobel prize winner Samuel Beckett lived in the neighboring hamlet of Mollien for 36 years. The town's library and secondary school are named after him. André the Giant, three times Worldwide Wrestling champion, icon of the André the Giant Has a Posse (aka Obey) street art project grew up in the local canton. As a child, the American writer and filmmaker Oliver Stone used to spend all his summer holiday at his French maternal grands-parents' hotel in La Ferté-sous-Jouarre.

The area was invaded and occupied by the Germans from the beginning of the Great War, which led to considerable damage and casualties. After the war, on 14 August 1921, the town of La Ferté-sous-Jouarre was awarded the War Cross with the following citation:

"Occupée dès le début de la guerre, La Ferté a vu sa population gravement molestée par les Allemands. La Ferté a été l'objet, en 1914 et en 1918, de violents bombardements qui ont détruit nombre de ses maisons. Malgré ses deuils, La Ferté a donné un bel exemple de sang-froid et d'endurance." (English: "La Ferté was occupied from the very beginning of World War I and its population was severely treated by the Germans. La Ferté endured violent shelling in 1914 and 1918 that destroyed several houses. In spite of its losses, La Ferté set a fine example of bravery and endurance.")

On the south-western edge of the town, on the south bank of the river Marne, is the La Ferté-sous-Jouarre memorial, commemorating more than 3000 British soldiers from the Great War with no known grave. They died in fighting in the area against the Germans.

== Demographics ==
Inhabitants of La Ferté-sous-Jouarre are called Fertois in French.

Historical population
Year	Pop.	±% p.a.
1968	6,277	—
1975	6,872	+1.30%
1982	7,007	+0.28%
1990	8,236	+2.04%
1999	8,584	+0.46%
2007	8,982	+0.57%
2012	9,363	+0.83%
2017	9,619	+0.54%
2023	10,254	+1.07%
Source: INSEE

== Notable residents ==
- Antoine of Navarre (1518–1562), King of Navarre, Father Henri IV
- Charles, Cardinal de Bourbon (1523–1590), French Cardinal
- Madame de Pompadour (1721–1764), member of the French court
- Antoine Samuel Adam-Salomon (1818–1881), French sculptor & photography pioneer
- Fanny Marc (1858–1937), French sculptor
- Henri Pouctal (1860–1922), early French silent film director
- Maurice Holleaux (1861–1932), 19th–20th-century French historian, archaeologist and epigrapher died in the city.
- Samuel Beckett (1906–1989), Irish avant-garde writer, dramatist, and poet
- Maurice Tranchant de Lunel (1869–1944), French architect born in La Ferté-sous-Jouarre
- André the Giant (1946–1993), Triple Worldwide Wrestling champion, wrestler and icon of the Andre the Giant Has a Posse (Obey) street art
- Oliver Stone (1946–), American writer and filmmaker.
- Robert Hampson (1965–), English musician, singer, composer

== Twin towns ==
- Zuffenhausen-Stuttgart, Germany

== See also ==
- Communes of the Seine-et-Marne department
