= Jean-Claude de Givenchy =

French aristocrat, businessman, perfumer (1925–2009)

Jean Claude Taffin de Givenchy
- De Givenchy, c. 1978
- Born: Jean Claude Jacques Robert Taffin de Givenchy; May 5, 1925; Beauvais, France
- Died: May 18, 2009 (aged 83); Cannes, France
- Resting place: Passy Cemetery
- Citizenship: France; United States (since 1951)
- Known for: Owning and leading Parfums Givenchy
- Spouses: Patricia Marie Myrick (m. 1947) Ellen Ahr Funkhouser (m. 1979)
- Children: 7 (including James de Givenchy)
- Relatives: Hubert de Givenchy (brother)

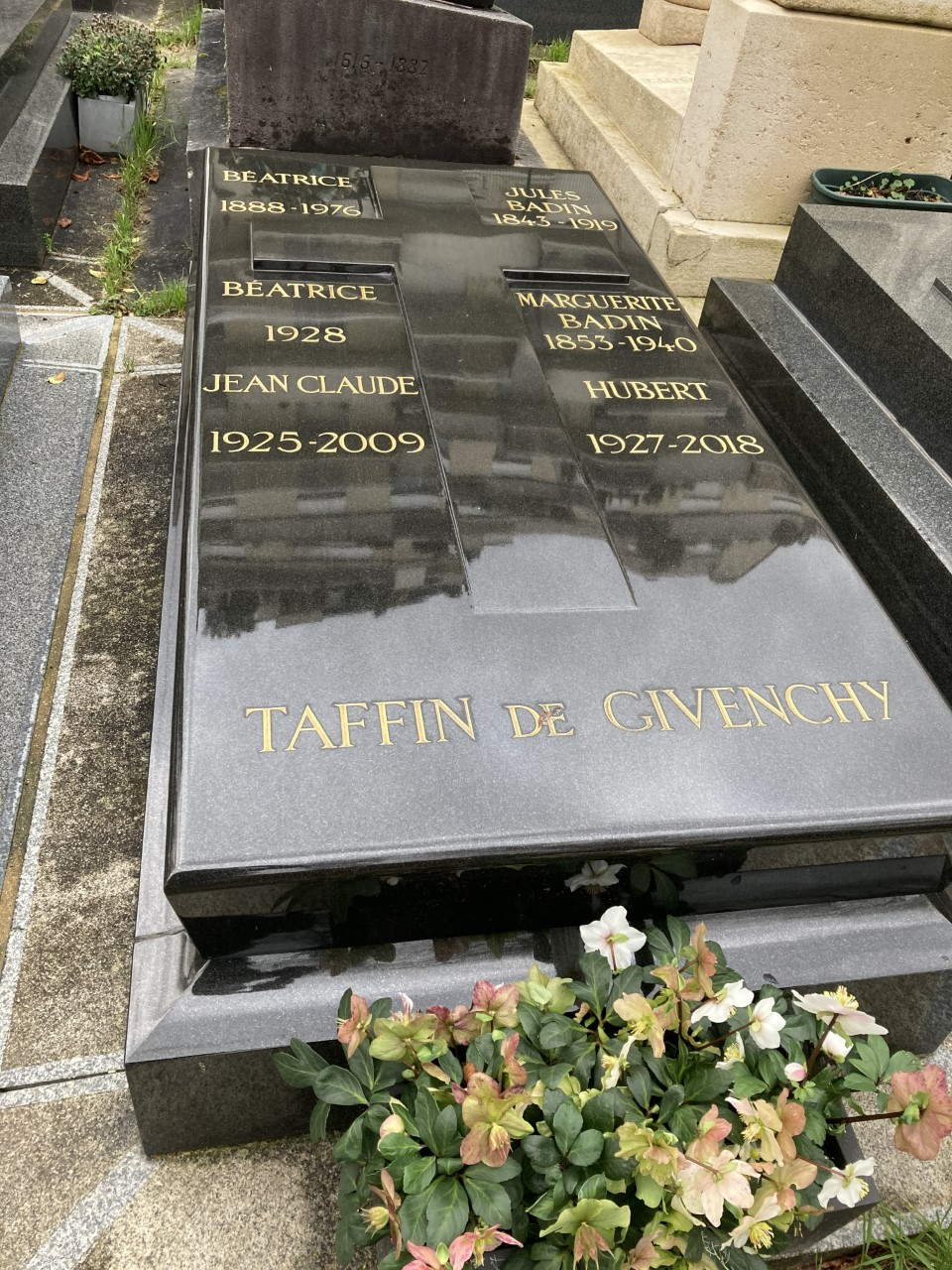
Taffin de Givenchy Family Grave in Passy Cemetery

Jean-Claude Jacques Robert Taffin, Marquis de Givenchy (May 5, 1925 – May 18, 2009) was a French aristocrat, businessman, perfumer and owner of Parfums Givenchy.

== Early life ==
De Givenchy was born May 5, 1925, in Beauvais, France, the eldest son of Lucien Taffin de Givenchy, Marquis of Givenchy (1888–1930) and his wife Béatrice "Sissi" (née Badin; 1888–1976). He was raised alongside his younger brother, later fashion designer Hubert de Givenchy (1927–2018). The family originally hailed from Venice, Italy, the original spelling of the family name being Taffini turned later, landing in France, in Taffin. The family was ennobled in 1713 at which they became Marquis of Givenchy and started carrying the name de Givenchy. When he was barely five years of age, he lost his father to influenza. From then on he and his brother were brought up by his mother and maternal grandmother in Beauvais, France. His maternal grandfather Jules Badin (1843–1919) was the owner and director of the historic Gobelins Manufactory and Beauvais tapestry factories.

== Career ==
Jean-Claude, as the elder of the brothers, inherited the family's courtesy title of marquis at the death of their father.

He started his career as an executive for Air France in New York City, but upon request in 1952 of his brother Hubert he returned to Beauvais to manage the Parfums Givenchy, which he later owned and was sold to Bernard Arnault's LVMH alongside the Givenchy fashion house.

== Personal life ==
De Givenchy was married privately to American-born Patricia Marie Myrick (1926–2012), daughter of an US Army colonel and relative of the future American fashion designer Sarah Staudinger. He became a naturalized U.S. citizen in 1951.

They had seven children:

- Richard Taffin de Givenchy (1948–2021), twin of Patrick.
- Patrick Taffin de Givenchy (born 1948), twin of Richard.
- Philippe Taffin de Givenchy (born 1952), formerly the owner of Atmosphere by Philippe de Givenchy, LLC, based in Greenwich, Connecticut.
- Hubert Taffin de Givenchy (1954–2016), who married Hong Kong-born Parisian model Suzi de Givenchy. They had three sons.
- Béatrice Taffin de Givenchy (born 1956)
- James Taffin de Givenchy (born 1963), twin of Olivier, co-owner of the Château du Jonchet, who married American fashion designer Gina de Givenchy. They have one daughter.
- Olivier Taffin de Givenchy (born 1963), twin of James, French-American financier and region head of JPMorgan Chase, co-owner of the Château du Jonchet, who married firstly Christine (née Paul; later Goulding), with whom he has one daughter and one son (including Gabriella de Mallmann), divorced and married secondly Melbourne-born wealth management consultant-turned-homeware entrepreneur Zoë de Givenchy (née Couper), with whom he has another son.

After his divorce of his first wife, he married in 1979 in Broward, Florida, Ellen de Givenchy (née Ahr; formerly Funkhouser), of Concord, Massachusetts, a former teacher, with whom he had stepdaughter Elizabeth [Funkhouser de Givenchy] Soriano (née Funkhouser), and moved back to France where they settled in Chateauneuf-de-Grasse. Previously, he was a long-term resident of Greenwich, Connecticut.
