= Suzi de Givenchy =

Hong Kong-French model

- Born: Huang Xian Xi; 1966 (age 59–60); British Hong Kong
- Occupation: Model
- Years active: 2019–present
- Spouse: Hubert Taffin de Givenchy
- Children: 3
- Modeling information
- Hair color: Black
- Eye color: Brown
- Agency: Mirah Management

Suzi Taffin de Givenchy (née Huang Xian Xi; born 1966) is a Hong Kong-born French-American model. She has walked the runway and modeled in campaigns for Balenciaga, Schiaparelli, Lemaire, Net-a-Porter, and Boucheron. She was a cover girl on the January/February 2023 issue of Vogue Singapore.

== Early life ==
Givenchy was born in British Hong Kong in 1966 to Chinese parents. When she was four years old, her family emigrated to the United States. She grew up in New York City.

== Career ==
In her youth, Givenchy worked as a showroom model for Liz Claiborne. She began her haute couture modeling career in 2019, after meeting the director of Next Management France, Versae Vanni, at a dinner party. She walked her first runway show for Off-White and then worked modeled for Balenciaga under the creative direction of Demna Gvasalia and also AZ Factory and Uma Wang. She has appeared in Vogue Hong Kong and Vogue China. In 2022, she walked in Off-White's autumn/winter show in Paris. In 2023, she was featured in Schiaparelli's spring campaign and was the covergirl of Vogue Singapore's January/February issue. She has also walked for Lemaire and Helmut Land and modeled in campaigns for Net-a-Porter and Boucheron.

== Personal life ==
She moved to France when she was twenty years old. She married Hubert Taffin de Givenchy, the son of Jean-Claude Taffin, Marquis de Givenchy and the nephew and godson of Count Hubert de Givenchy. They have three children. Her husband died in 2016.
