= Heathcote Dicken Statham =

English conductor, composer and organist (1889-1973)

- Born: December 7, 1889
- Died: October 29, 1973 (aged 83)
- Occupations: Conductor, Composer, Organist
- Known for: International reputation in music

Heathcote Dicken Statham CBE (7 December 1889 - 29 October 1973) was a conductor, composer and organist of international repute.

== Early life ==
He was the eldest son of Henry Heathcote Statham (1839-1924) and Florence Elizabeth Dicken (1856-1938). His father was an amateur musician who played organ and contributed articles to Grove's Dictionary of Music and Musicians. From Gresham's School, Holt, Statham proceeded to Gonville and Caius College, Cambridge, where in March 1908 he was awarded the college's organ scholarship of £60 a year for three years, before completing his musical education at the Royal College of Music, London.

== Career ==
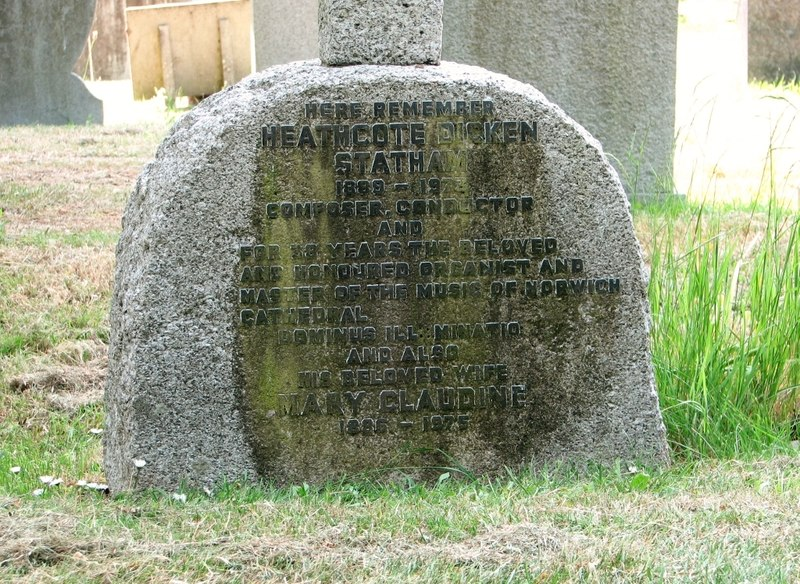
Gravestone of Heathcote Dicken Statham at Rosary Cemetery, Norwich

He became organist of Calcutta Cathedral 1913 - 1920, then St. Michael's College, Tenbury 1920 - 1926, then St. Mary's Church, Southampton 1926 - 1928, and finally of Norwich Cathedral, holding that post from 1928 to 1966. On 9 April 1938, while Statham was playing it, the organ of the cathedral caught fire. In the choir, Statham's nickname was 'Dickey'.

As a composer he is best known for his Rhapsody on a Ground for organ (1944) and his settings of the Magnificat & Nunc Dimittis in E minor and G. His arrangements of Christmas carols include Joy! Joy! from every Steeple. In the 1980s Christopher Palmer arranged The Bells of St Chad’s: Postlude for strings from the final movement of his Four Diversions for organ (1957).

He conducted the Norwich Philharmonic Orchestra on some one hundred and thirty occasions between 1928 and 1961, and during the Second World War conducted the London Symphony Orchestra.

He was appointed a Commander of the Order of the British Empire in the 1967 Birthday Honours and died at the age of 83 on 29 October 1973.

Preceded by Frank Bates	Organist and Master of the Music, Norwich Cathedral; 1928 – 1967	Succeeded by Brian Runnett
