= Ari Emanuel =

American businessman (born 1961)

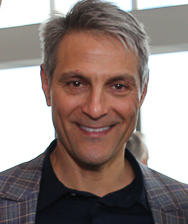
- Emanuel in 2016
- Born: Ariel Zev Emanuel; March 29, 1961 (age 65); Chicago, Illinois, U.S.
- Education: Macalester College (BA)
- Occupation: Businessman
- Years active: 2007–present
- Spouse(s): Sarah Hardwick Addington (m. 1996; div. 2018) Sarah Staudinger (m. 2022)
- Children: 5
- Relatives: Rahm Emanuel (brother); Ezekiel Emanuel (brother)

Ariel Zev Emanuel (born March 29, 1961) is an American businessman who is the executive chairman of WME Group, an entertainment and media agency, as well as CEO and executive chairman of TKO Group Holdings, which owns the UFC and WWE.

He was a founding partner of the Endeavor Talent Agency and was instrumental in shaping its June 2009 merger with the William Morris Agency.

== Early life ==
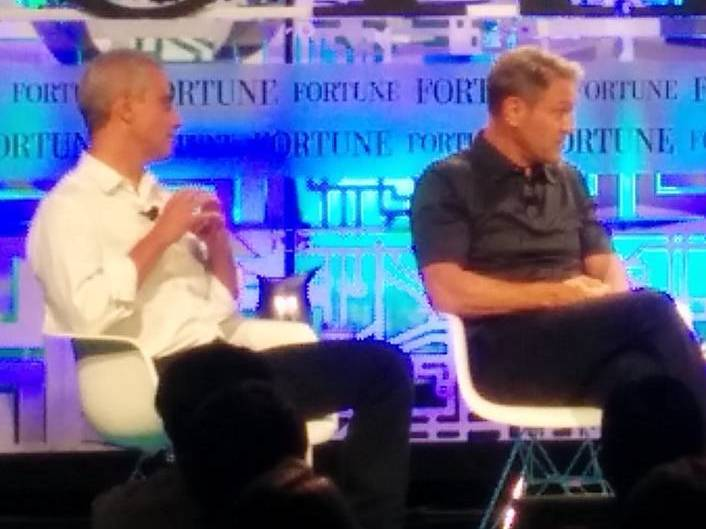
Ari (right) participating in a forum alongside his brother Rahm (left)

Ari Emanuel was raised in suburban Wilmette, Illinois. Emanuel is the brother of former mayor of Chicago, Presidential Chief of Staff and U.S. Ambassador to Japan Rahm Emanuel, American oncologist and bioethicist Ezekiel Emanuel, and sister Shoshana Emanuel (who was adopted).

Ari's father, Jerusalem-born Benjamin M. Emanuel, was a pediatrician who was active in the Zionist paramilitary organization Irgun in Mandatory Palestine. His mother, Marsha Emanuel (née Smulevitz), was a civil rights activist, and the one-time owner of a Chicago-area rock and roll club.

During his third grade at school, Ari was diagnosed with ADHD and dyslexia. To supplement instruction at school, his mother spent many hours helping him to learn to read. She hired tutors and private instructors to give him private reading lessons at home. Emanuel attended New Trier High School and graduated from Macalester College in 1983.

== Career ==
In his early career, Emanuel worked as an assistant to New York talent agent Robert Lantz and then as a trainee at Creative Artists Agency in Hollywood after getting a start working in the company's mail room in 1987. Prior to founding Endeavor, Emanuel was a partner at InterTalent and senior agent at ICM Partners (ICM). In 1995, Emanuel began a year and a half in recovery after getting hit by a flatbed truck, and was inspired during this period in time to start his own company. In March 1995, Emanuel started Endeavor. Emanuel has been a member of Live Nation Entertainment board of directors since September 2007.

Emanuel has been described as a mogul and power player in Hollywood. Emanuel and Patrick Whitesell, the co-CEO of WME, have both been named to Fortune's Businessperson of the Year list. In a May 2013 article on Emanuel, Fortune called him "one of the biggest guns in the consolidating entertainment business".

Emanuel's relationships with his clients, coupled with his stature in the industry, has led to various homages and parodies over the years, including Bob Odenkirk's character Stevie Grant on The Larry Sanders Show, and Ari Gold, played by Jeremy Piven on the HBO television show Entourage.

In April 2002 agent Sandra Epstein and other Endeavor employees sued Ari Emanuel on allegations that a pornographic website was operated out of Endeavor's offices and that Emanuel made racist and anti-gay remarks. Emanuel disputed these accusations at the time. Emanuel settled Epstein's claims for $2.25 million.

In 2011, Emanuel co-founded TheAudience with Sean Parker and Oliver Luckett.

Endeavor went public in 2021, the first Hollywood agency to do so, with Emanuel owning a stake worth around $480 million according to Bloomberg. He and Patrick Whitesell are also co-CEO of IMG, a global sports, events and talent management company headquartered in New York City.

In 2023, Emanuel's total compensation from Endeavor was $83.9 million, up 340% from the previous year and representing a CEO-to-median worker pay ratio of 1,184-to-1 for the company, as well as making Emanuel the seventh highest paid CEO in the US that year. He debuted on the Bloomberg Billionaires Index in February 2025 with an estimated net worth of over $1 billion.

In 2025, Emanuel is set to buy Frieze, a global art fair and publishing group, previously owned by Endeavor. The deal is valued at $200 million and is backed by a group of investors including Apollo Global Management and RedBird Capital Partners.

In August 2026, Emanuel's company, MARI, reached a deal to buy private equity firm Providence Equity's stake in theater operator ATG Entertainment. The terms of the deal were not released but were estimated by The Hollywood Reporter at $6 billion.

== Public advocacy ==
Emanuel has hosted fundraisers for the Democratic Party. He donated $2,700 to Hillary Clinton in the 2016 United States presidential election. His long-standing relationship with his former client Donald Trump is well documented. During the 2016 Republican Party presidential primaries, Emanuel offered to produce a movie for Trump which was considered for the 2016 Republican National Convention but ultimately was not followed through on.

After the disappearance of Washington Post journalist Jamal Khashoggi on October 2, 2018, and reports that the Saudi hit squad had assassinated him inside their consulate in Turkey, Emanuel called White House senior adviser and Trump son-in-law Jared Kushner. Emanuel tried to extricate Endeavor from a $400 million deal with the Saudi Arabian government.

In October 2022, Emanuel urged several businesses to stop working with rapper Kanye West over his antisemitic comments.

Emanuel voiced critical opinions of Israeli prime minister Benjamin Netanyahu when he was awarded the Humanitarian Prize at Simon Wiesenthal Center's National Tribute Gala. Emanuel called for Netanyahu to step down during his speech, which caused a negative reaction from the audience. He also criticized protesters using the slogan "from the river to the sea" which he claimed was a call for genocide.

== Philanthropy ==
Emanuel has in the past been active on the board of trustees of P.S. Arts, a Los Angeles, California-based nonprofit organization that works to bring art education programs to Southern California schools. He has also helped the Museum of Contemporary Art, Los Angeles, establish MOCAtv, a dedicated YouTube art channel. In 2012, he joined the museum's board of trustees.

== Personal life ==
In 1995 Emanuel was seriously injured after a flatbed truck hit him while he was crossing the street. The incident resulted in Emanuel flying 20 feet and he was left with multiple broken ribs, a torn ACL and a cracked head. After undergoing a year and a half of recovery he avoided paralysis. His ability to recover from the incident became a source of inspiration for him on how he decided to pursue his career.

In 1996, Emanuel married girlfriend Sarah Hardwick Addington; they have three sons. The couple divorced in 2018. In May 2022, he married fashion designer Sarah Staudinger, founder of the Los Angeles label STAUD. Emanuel adopted the daughter of Shoshana, his adopted sister.

He follows a strict vegan diet.

== Books ==
- Emanuel, Ari (September 22, 2026). Roll the Calls: A Memoir (First hardcover ed.). New York: Alfred A. Knopf. ISBN 9798217209347. OCLC 1617438726.
