= Amarige =

Perfume by Dominique Ropion for Givenchy

Fragrance by Givenchy
- Released: 1991
- Label: Parfums Givenchy

Amarige is a perfume produced by French fashion house Givenchy. Amarige was introduced in 1991, created by perfumer Dominique Ropion. Its bottle was designed by Pierre Dinand, taking as its inspiration the ruffled sleeves of the Bettina blouse.

The name Amerige is an anagram of the word Mariage (marriage), and in fact, according to Givenchy's philosophy, the perfume is supposed to evoke "the happiness of a summer evening on the edge of the Mediterranean," or, according to what is written on the fashion house's official website, "...the symbol of femininity, radiant and full of happiness, joie de vivre and generosity."
