= L'Interdit =

Givenchy perfume

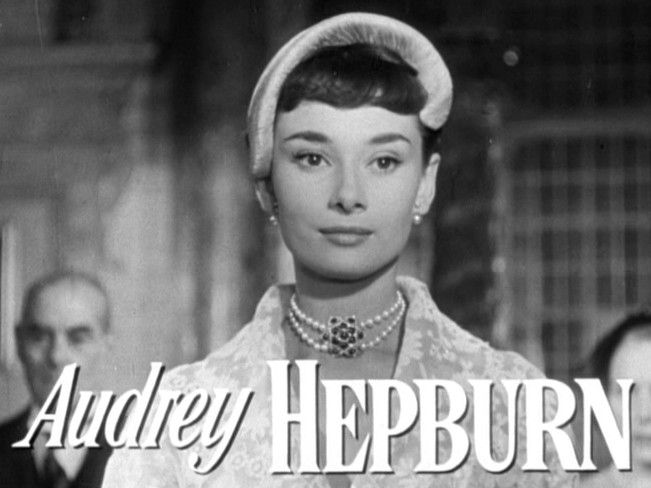
- Audrey Hepburn
- Product type: Perfume
- Current owner: Hubert de Givenchy; Parfums Givenchy
- Introduced: 1957
- Discontinued: discontinued in the 1990s in the US before reformulating in 2002
- Markets: Worldwide

L'Interdit (pronounced [lɛ̃.tɛʁ.di]) was a perfume created in 1954 by Hubert de Givenchy. The word interdit is French for "forbidden." The parfumeur behind this feminine aldehydic-floral fragrance was Francis Fabron (1913–2005). It has a delicate, floral, powdery aroma. It contains notes of rose, jasmine, violet and, at the heart, a blend of woods and grasses.

Givenchy created the perfume for Audrey Hepburn, who wore it exclusively until its release to the public in 1957. Hepburn also became the first actress to become the face of a perfume, for L'Interdit.

== Creation ==
L'Interdit was secretly created in 1954 and was worn only by actress Audrey Hepburn, to whom it was given as a gift by Hubert de Givenchy, who had dressed her. For this, he called on a laboratory in Grasse, Roure Bertrand Dupont (nowadays Givaudan), who started with a base of aldehydes, reminiscent of the smell of soap, frost, and freshly cleaned sheets, which lifts and enhances floral scents, and became a popular ingredient in perfumes of the 1950s. In those years, perfumers also often used bouquets of scents, whereas nowadays the notes are more linear. L'Interdit thus includes tonka bean in the base note. Olfactologist at Givenchy, Françoise Donche notes that “without being sulphurous, L'Interdit evokes a passionate seduction. The mischievous side of the top notes turns out to be quite sensual in the end, the carnation is not so demure and the clove, a burning spice, brings a clearly intoxicating touch.” It is part of the “floral aldehyde” family.

In 1957, Hubert de Givenchy decided to market the perfume, to which Audrey Hepburn replied: “But I forbid you”. The star finally lifted his ban and participated in this to give the name to the perfume.

== Success ==
L'Interdit quickly became successful with 4000 sales in its first days; a promising figure considering, at the time, it was only sold in France.
