= Arthur Paunzen =

Austrian artist

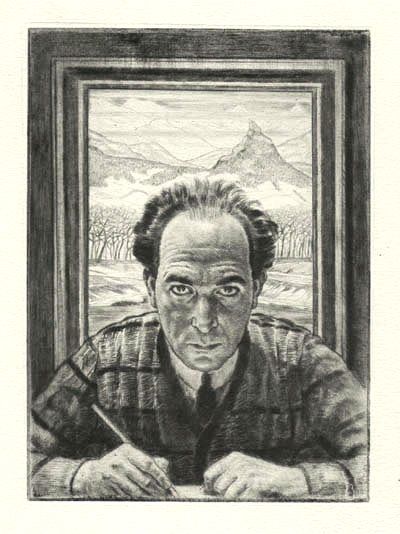
Self-portrait (1925)

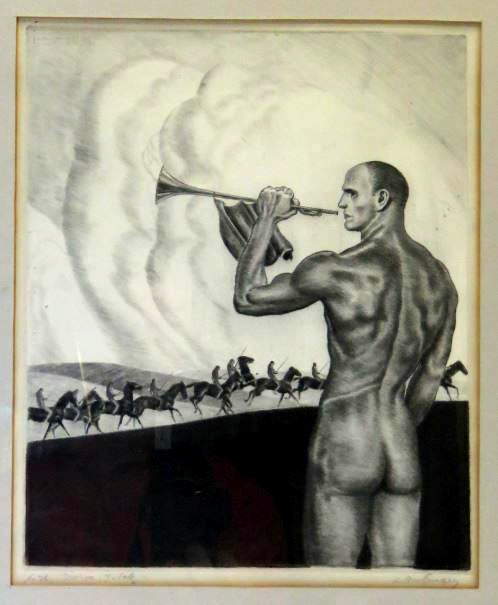
Eroica

Arthur Paunzen (4 February 1890 – 9 August 1940) was a Jewish Austrian etcher, engraver and illustrator.

== Biography ==
He was born on 4 February in Vienna, to Leopold Paunzen and his wife Hermine, née Kuhn, who were Jewish. He studied with Ludwig Koch in Vienna and in France, at the Académie Julian, under Jean-Pierre Laurens. Later, he traveled throughout Italy, studying art and architecture. In 1918, shortly after he began exhibiting, he married Cornelia Westreich (1894–1971), who was also Jewish, in Vienna.

An interest in music led him to create a number of works that convey music as symbolic images. For instance, depicting Beethoven's Eroica Symphony as nude horse-backed lancers, surrounded by clouds and flanked by a trumpeter who might be Death. He also created a series based on Gustav Mahler's song cycle, "Das Lied von der Erde".

His interests extended to literature, including a series of etchings depicting Raskolnikov, from Dostoevsky's Crime and Punishment.

In 1938, when Hitler annexed Austria, he and his wife moved to Great Britain.

== Later life and death ==
In May 1940, the British authorities interned all German and Austrian citizens in the country. He was among them and died on 9 August 1940, in the Central Internment Camp, Douglas, Isle of Man.

His friend and fellow-internee, the composer Hans Gál, kept a detailed diary. In it, he describes Paunzen's cause of death as severe bronchial pneumonia, made worse by neglect on the part of the camp's medical workers. He is buried in the Jewish section of the Douglas Borough Cemetery.

Many of his pieces were collected by the British Museum, the Stockholm Engraving Collection at the Nationalmuseum, and the Albertina Museum in Vienna.
