= James de Givenchy =

American jewelry designer

- Born: James Claude Taffin de Givenchy; August 27, 1963 (age 63); Beauvais, France
- Education: Manhattanville College (BFA)
- Occupation: Jewelry designer
- Organization: Taffin
- Spouse: Gina de Givenchy
- Children: 1
- Relatives: Hubert de Givenchy (uncle); Sarah Staudinger (cousin)

James Claude Taffin de Givenchy (born August 27, 1963) is an American businessman and jewelry designer. He is the owner of the jewelry company Taffin, which he founded in 1996.

== Early life ==
Givenchy was born and raised in Beauvais, a suburb which is located one hour north of Paris. He was the youngest of seven children born to Jean-Claude de Givenchy (1925–2009) and his American-born wife Patricia Marie de Givenchy (née Myrick; 1926–2009). His father was long-time president of Parfums Givenchy. His mother was born in Washington, D.C. and met Givenchy while he was working in New York as an executive for Air France. During that period they resided in Greenwich, Connecticut but relocated to France after he took over the management of Parfums Givenchy. His mother died in Saint Malo in Brittany. He was a nephew of the fashion designer and founder of Givenchy, Hubert de Givenchy.

== Career ==
James de Givenchy moved to New York in the early 1980s, where he earned a degree in Fine Arts from Manhattanville College and an associate degree in graphic design from F.I.T. He joined Christie's auction house where he ultimately ran the West Coast Jewelry Department in Los Angeles between 1991 and 1994. He left to work for Fulco di Verdura and then started his own jewelry concern in Manhattan in 1996.

He has cited Suzanne Belperron and Jeanne Toussaint as key influences. Taffin pieces have been featured in multiple fashion magazines. In 2003, Givenchy's jewelry was exhibited at the Long Beach Museum of Art. He also received a Star of Design Award in 2008 for his work in the field of jewelry design.

In 2008, Taffin launched a limited edition series of men's wristwatches which have been featured in Men's Vogue. In June 2008, he was named creative director for Sotheby's Diamonds.

In 2012, Givenchy was appointed as Baccarat's first creative director. He was featured in Architectural Digest and the Wall Street Journal.

== Personal life ==
He is married to Gina de Givenchy, they have one daughter.

Givenchy resides in New York City, New York.
