= Jean-Pierre Laurens =

French painter (1875–1932)

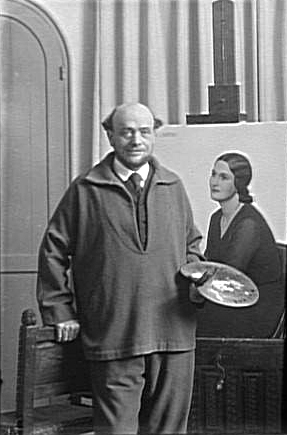
Jean-Pierre Laurens in his studio (1931)

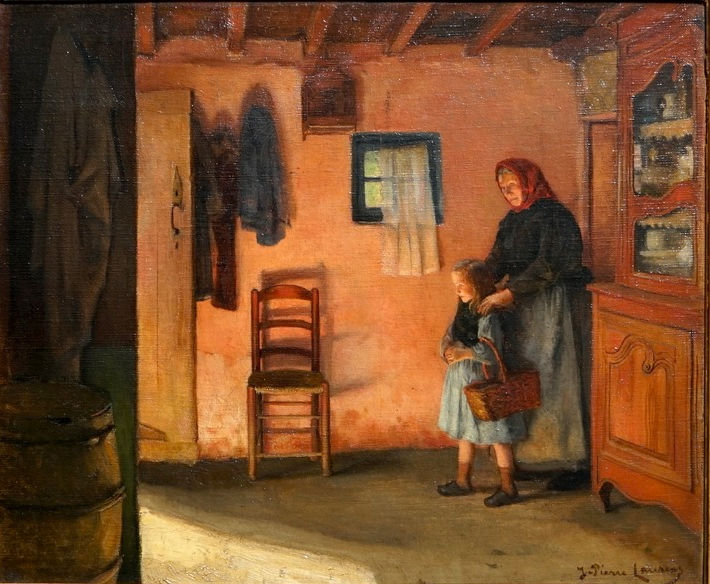
Mother and Daughter

Jean-Pierre Laurens (18 March 1875, Paris – 23 April 1932, Fontenay-aux-Roses) was a French painter, primarily of figures and portraits.

== Biography ==
He was the youngest son of the painter, Jean-Paul Laurens. His older brother, Paul Albert Laurens, also became an artist, and he was married to the sculptor, Yvonne Diéterle. He studied with Léon Bonnat at the École des Beaux-Arts.

His first exhibit at the Salon came in 1899, when he was presented with a third-class medal. In 1900, he was awarded a silver medal and a travel grant. A second-class medal followed in 1906.

Shortly after the beginning of World War I, he received a bullet wound to the leg and was taken prisoner near Rocquigny. In September, 1914, he was transferred to the prison camp at Wittenberg, south of Berlin, where he made sketches of the harsh conditions and the typhus epidemic that ravaged the camp. He was later taken to a labor camp in Courland and, after the war, spent time at a Red Cross camp in Switzerland. He managed to preserve his drawings and they were published as Prisonniers de guerre. Cahier à la mémoire des compagnons de captivité du camp de Wittenberg in 1918.

In 1928, he was commissioned to decorate the new Église Notre-Dame-du-Calvaire de Châtillon, designed by Joseph Flandrin (1857–1939) and Yves-Marie Froidevaux. He died before the project was completed so his wife, Yvonne, took his place.

In 1930, he was elected to the Académie des Beaux-Arts. He also taught at the École and the Académie Julian. many of students became well known, including Étienne Blandin, Étienne Buffet, Jules Cavaillès, Jean-Henri Couturat, Fang Ganmin, Georges Joubin, František Kupka, Arthur Paunzen and André Leroux. His works may be seen at the Musée départemental de l'Oise, Musée des Beaux-Arts de Bordeaux, Musée des Beaux-Arts de Dole, Musée des Pêcheries, Musée National d'Art Moderne and Musée des Beaux-Arts de Rouen.
