= Sarah Staudinger =

American fashion designer (born 1989)

- Born: 1989 (age 36–37); Los Angeles, California, U.S.
- Education: The New School
- Occupation: Fashion designer
- Known for: Founder of STAUD
- Spouse: Ari Emanuel (m. 2022)
- Relatives: James de Givenchy (cousin); Rahm Emanuel (brother-in-law); Ezekiel Emanuel (brother-in-law)
- Website: staud.clothing

Sarah Staudinger (born in 1989) is an American fashion designer, entrepreneur, and founder of the fashion label STAUD. In 2019, she was named to the Forbes 30 Under 30 Arts & Style list.

== Early life ==
Staudinger was born 1989 in Los Angeles to a Lebanese mother, Joanna Malouf, a designer, and a German father, Walter Staudinger, a businessman. Her mother and maternal grandfather also worked in the fashion business. Her godmother is Cher, a close friend of her mother.

== Career ==
Staudinger launched her brand STAUD with business partner George Augusto in 2015, and it grew substantially in 2018. The brand has been described as having a cult following; its accessory line has been particularly successful, launching popular items like the Moreau bucket bag as well as collaborations with New Balance and Birkenstock. Prior to STAUD, she was the fashion director at the brand Reformation. Earlier in her career, she worked as an assistant stylist.

== Personal life ==
In May 2022, Staudinger married Hollywood agent Ari Emanuel in Saint-Tropez. Comedian Larry David, a friend of Emanuel, officiated the wedding.
