= Henry Heathcote Statham =

Henry Heathcote Statham (11 January 1839 – 29 May 1924) was an English architect, architectural journalist and editor, and music critic.

== Career ==
Statham was the son of a Liverpool solicitor and was educated at the Liverpool Collegiate Institution, after which he was articled to an architect in the city, where he subsequently practiced for a time.

Aged around 30, he moved to London. In 1884, he became editor of The Builder ("then one of the most important influences on architecture throughout the British Empire"), retaining the post until 1908, during which time he designed the fronts of the magazine's office and its neighbours at 2-6 Catherine Street in 1903. He contributed papers to the Royal Institute of British Architects and the Architectural Association, of which he was a member. He was a notable critic, in 1916, of the design of London's Tower Bridge, saying "it represents the vice of tawdriness and pretentiousness, and of falsification of the actual facts of the structure".

He also contributed articles to the 1911 Encyclopædia Britannica.

An amateur musician, Statham gave classical organ recitals at London's Royal Albert Hall. He was music critic for the Edinburgh Review (contributing essays on Franz Schubert in 1881 and 1883, for example), and a contributor to Grove’s Dictionary of Music and Musicians, The Fortnightly Review and Nineteenth Century. He was a member of the Royal Musical Association, and a Fellow of the Royal Philharmonic Society.

== Personal life ==
He married Florence Elizabeth Dicken (1856–1938) on 17 February 1887, in Upper Norwood, London, and died in Torquay in 1924. They had at least two sons, the eldest, Heathcote Dicken Statham, becoming a conductor, composer and organist of international repute.

== Published works ==
- My Thoughts on Music and Musicians (1892)
- Form and Design in Music (1893)
- The Cathedrals of England and Wales (1894)
- Architecture for General Readers: A Short Treatise on the Principles of Architectural Design with a Historical Sketch (1895; later editions published in 1896 and 1909)
- Modern Architecture: A Book for Architects and the Public (1897)
- Architecture Among the Poets (1898)
- Winged Words (published anonymously, 1907)
- The Organ and Its Position in Musical Art: a Book for Musicians and Amateurs (1909)
- Design for Remodeling the Front of the National Gallery and Laying Out Trafalgar Square (1912)
- Short Critical History of Architecture (1912; later editions published in 1927 and 1950)
- What is Music? A Short Analysis for the General Reader (1913)
