= Hubert de Givenchy =

French fashion designer (1927–2018)

Count Hubert de Givenchy
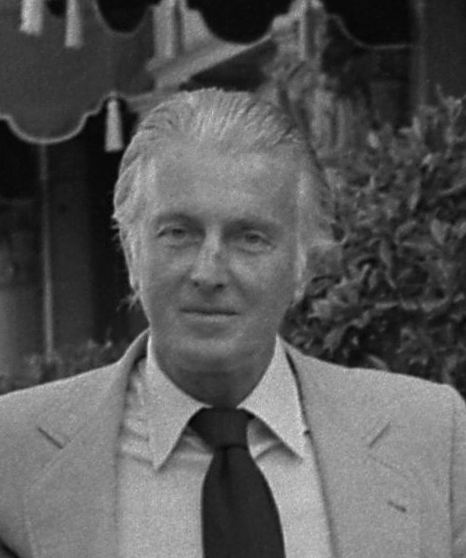
- Givenchy in 1978
- Born: 20 February 1927; Beauvais, France
- Died: 10 March 2018 (aged 91); Neuilly-sur-Seine, France
- Education: École des Beaux-Arts
- Known for: Little black dress
- Label: Givenchy
- Partner: Philippe Venet
- Relatives: Jean-Claude de Givenchy (brother); James de Givenchy (nephew)
- Awards: Chevalier de la Légion d'honneur (1983); Medal of l'Ordre des Arts et des Lettres (1992)

Hubert James Marcel Taffin de Givenchy (French: [ybɛʁ də ʒivɑ̃ʃi]; 20 February 1927 – 10 March 2018) was a French fashion designer who founded the luxury fashion and perfume house of Givenchy in 1952. He is famous for having designed much of the personal and professional wardrobe of Audrey Hepburn and clothing for Jacqueline Bouvier Kennedy. He was named to the International Best Dressed List Hall of Fame in 1970.

== Early life ==
Hubert James Taffin de Givenchy was born on 20 February 1927 in Beauvais, Oise, into a Protestant noble family. He was the younger son of Lucien Taffin de Givenchy, Marquis of Givenchy (1888–1930), and his wife, the former Béatrice ("Sissi") Badin (1888–1976). The Taffin family was ennobled in 1713, at which time the head of the family became Marquis of Givenchy. His elder brother, Jean-Claude de Givenchy (1925–2009), inherited the family's courtesy title of marquis and eventually became the president of Parfums Givenchy. A third sibling, Beatrice, was born in 1928 but died shortly after birth. (Note: According to the family grave in Passy Cemetery.)

After his father's death from influenza in 1930, he was raised by his mother and maternal grandmother, Marguerite Badin (1853–1940, née Dieterle), the widow of Jules Badin (1843–1919), an artist who was the owner and director of the historic Gobelins Manufactory and Beauvais tapestry factories. Artistic professions ran in the extended Badin family. Givenchy's maternal great-grandfather, Jules Dieterle, was a set designer who also created designs for the Beauvais factory, including a set of 13 designs for the Elysée Palace. One of his great-great-grandfathers designed sets for the Paris Opera.

He moved to Paris at the age of 17, and he studied at the École des Beaux-Arts. He stood 6'6" tall.

== Career ==
Givenchy's first designs were done for Jacques Fath in 1945. Later he did designs for Robert Piguet and Lucien Lelong (1946) – working alongside the still-unknown Pierre Balmain and Christian Dior. From 1947 to 1951 he worked for the avantgarde designer Elsa Schiaparelli.

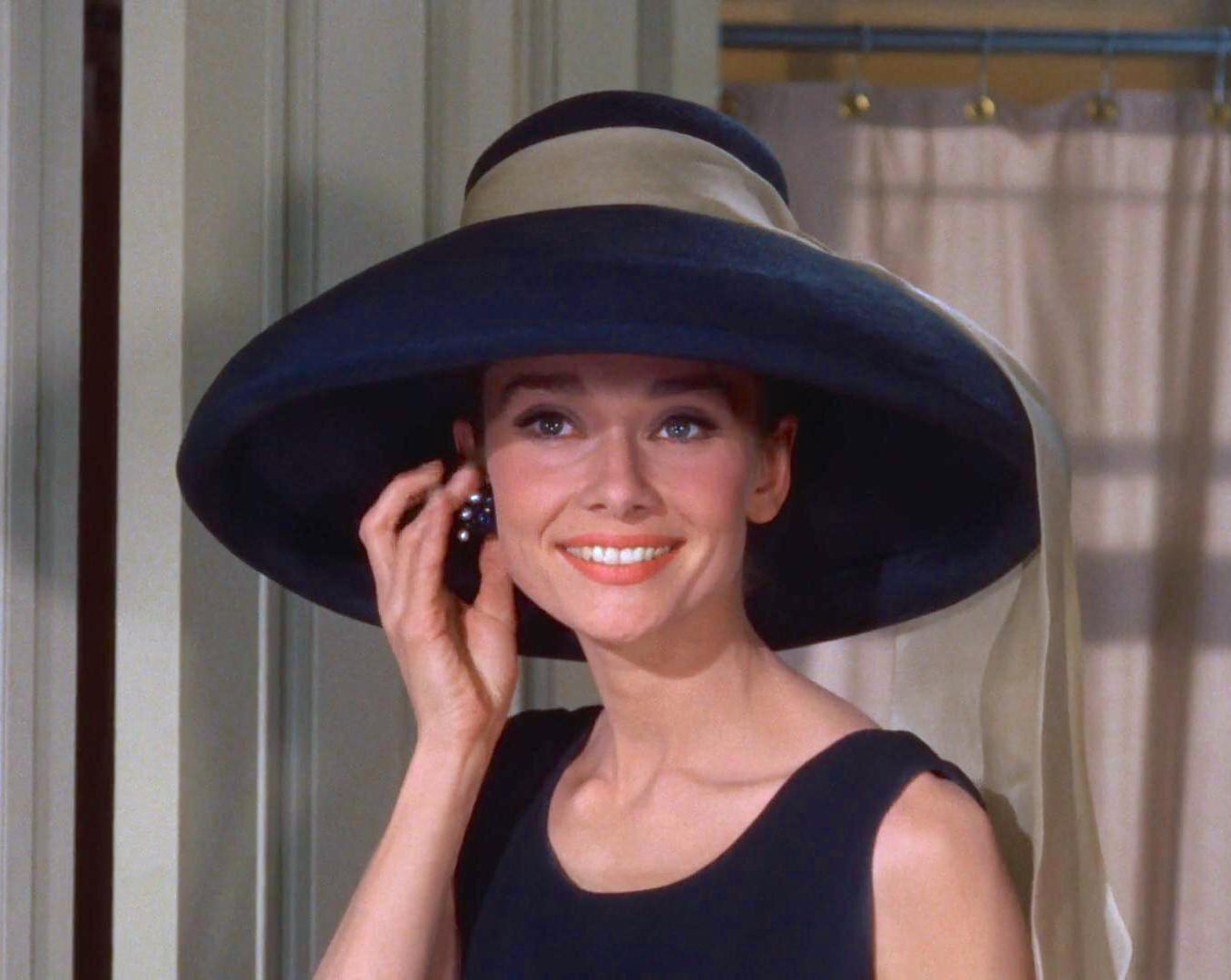
Hat for Audrey Hepburn in Breakfast at Tiffany's designed by Givenchy

In 1952, he opened his own design house at the Plaine Monceau in Paris, concentrating on versatile separates, especially deep-sleeved white blouses and scarves in shirting cotton, with leather tops and high-waisted wool skirts also receiving raves. Later, he named his first collection "Bettina Graziani" for Paris's top model at the time, who had provided indispensable support and publicity for him. His style was marked by innovation, contrary to the more conservative designs by Dior. At 25, he was the youngest designer of the progressive Paris fashion scene. His first collections were characterized by the use of rather cheap fabrics for financial reasons, but they always piqued curiosity through their design.

Audrey Hepburn, later the most prominent proponent of Givenchy's fashion, and Givenchy first met in 1953 during the shoot of Sabrina. He went on to design the black dress she wore in Breakfast at Tiffany's. He also developed his first perfume collection for her (L'Interdit and Le de Givenchy). Hepburn was the face of that fragrance. This was the first time a star was the face of a fragrance's advertising campaign.

At that time, he met his idol, Cristóbal Balenciaga. Givenchy sought inspiration not only from the lofty settings of haute couture but also in such avant-garde environments as Limbo, the store in Manhattan's East Village.

Givenchy's notable clients also included Donna Marella Agnelli, Lauren Bacall, Ingrid Bergman, Countess Mona von Bismarck, Countess Cristiana Brandolini d'Adda, Sunny von Bülow, Renata Tebaldi, Maria Callas, Capucine, Marlene Dietrich, Daisy Fellowes, Greta Garbo, Gloria Guinness, Dolores Guinness, Aimee de Heeren, Jane Holzer, Grace Kelly, Princess Salimah Aga Khan, Rachel Lambert Mellon, Sophia Loren, Jeanne Moreau, Jacqueline Kennedy Onassis, Empress Farah Pahlavi, Babe Paley, Lee Radziwill, Hope Portocarrero, Comtesse Jacqueline de Ribes, Nona Hendryx, Baroness Pauline de Rothschild, Frederica von Stade, Baroness Gaby Van Zuylen van Nijevelt, Diana Vreeland, Betsey Whitney, Baroness Sylvia de Waldner, the Duchess of Windsor, Haitian first lady Michèle Duvalier and Jayne Wrightsman.

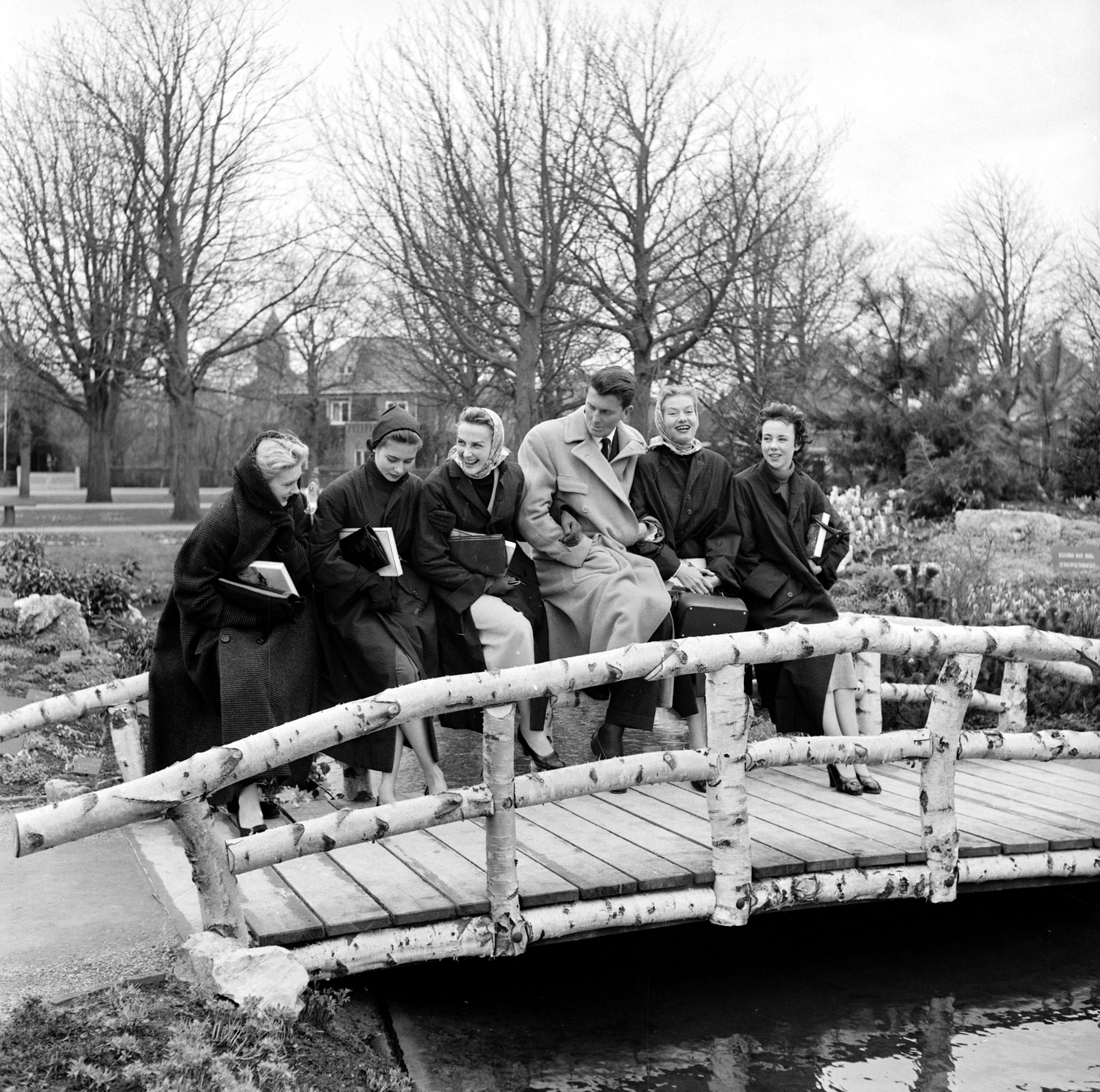
Hubert de Givenchy and models at International Flowershow Flora 1953 in the Netherlands

During the 1950s and early 1960s, he was considered one of the top couturiers. He debuted his prêt-à-porter collection in 1954, at which time his designs were considered to be both comfortably wearable, largely via a loosened fit, and well-shaped enough to have "hanger appeal". In 1955, he gained acclaim with an easy-fitting sweater style, a sleek, open-sided pump, and diminutive millinery. His most prophetic 1955 contribution was the shift dress, which he would alter in 1957 to produce the fuller but tapering "sack/sac dress," also called the chemise dress, soon copied by Christian Dior for his 1957 Fuseau/Spindle line. The same year, he felt confident enough with his stature to present his collections weeks after almost all other designers showed theirs, requiring a second trip to Paris for the press. He created the iconic 'balloon coat' and the 'baby doll' dress in 1958, making innovative contributions to the geometric seaming and experimental construction becoming prevalent at the time. His princess line of 1959 was also very influential. In 1969, a men's line was created.

While his premiere collection in the early 1950s had consisted of separates, they had still conformed to the rather dressy norms of the day. In the second half of the 1960s and into the 1970s, with the rise of much more casual styles like miniskirts and jeans, a societal rejection of materialism, and the decline in importance of haute couture, Givenchy's designs remained rather formal and dressy and he became much less influential, seen by some as a behind-the-times designer for wealthy women "of a certain age." There were signs of this change in position as early as 1963, when he rejected the fashion world's adoption of multiple heights of women's boots, sticking instead to staid pumps, and attempted to reintroduce a fitted princess silhouette when waistless shift and trapeze shapes were the strongest trend. During the miniskirt era, his hems remained longer than most, only rising to micromini length in the early seventies, when short lengths had come to seem the conservative position. He also joined 1971's brief vogue for hot pants and showed fabrics inspired by Mark Rothko.

With the return to dresses that accompanied 1974's Big Look trend, he began to be taken a little more seriously again, and with the return to formality and conspicuous-consumption, hats-gloves-suits-and-big-shoulders glamour reintroduced for fall of 1978 and continuing into the 1980s, Givenchy entered the upper echelons of fashion's status quo once again, joining designers like Valentino, Yves Saint Laurent, and Oscar de la Renta in showing shoulder-padded versions of the chemise dress, sharply tailored suits, grand entrance ballgowns, and cocktail dresses revived from the 1940s and 1950s. While no longer the innovator he was in the 1950s, his work was very popular and perfectly in line with the mood of the era's wealthy. He even joined other cocktail-set designers in showing the occasional above-the-knee skirt, newly acceptable to him now that it was dressy-looking instead of 1960s-casual, a tendency that increased during the eighties.

From 1976 through 1987 in the US, the Lincoln division of Ford Motor Company offered a Givenchy Edition of its Continental Mark series (1976 to 1982) and Lincoln Continental (1982 to 1987) automobiles, beginning with the 1976 Continental Mark IV coupe, continuing with the 1977-79 Mark V coupe, and ending with the 1982 Lincoln Mark VI and the 1987 Lincoln Continental sedan.

The House of Givenchy was split in 1981; the perfume line went to Veuve Clicquot, and the fashion branch was acquired by LVMH in 1989. As of today, LVMH owns Parfums Givenchy as well.

In 1988, he organized a retrospective of his work at the Beverly Wilshire Hotel in Beverly Hills, California.

== Later life ==
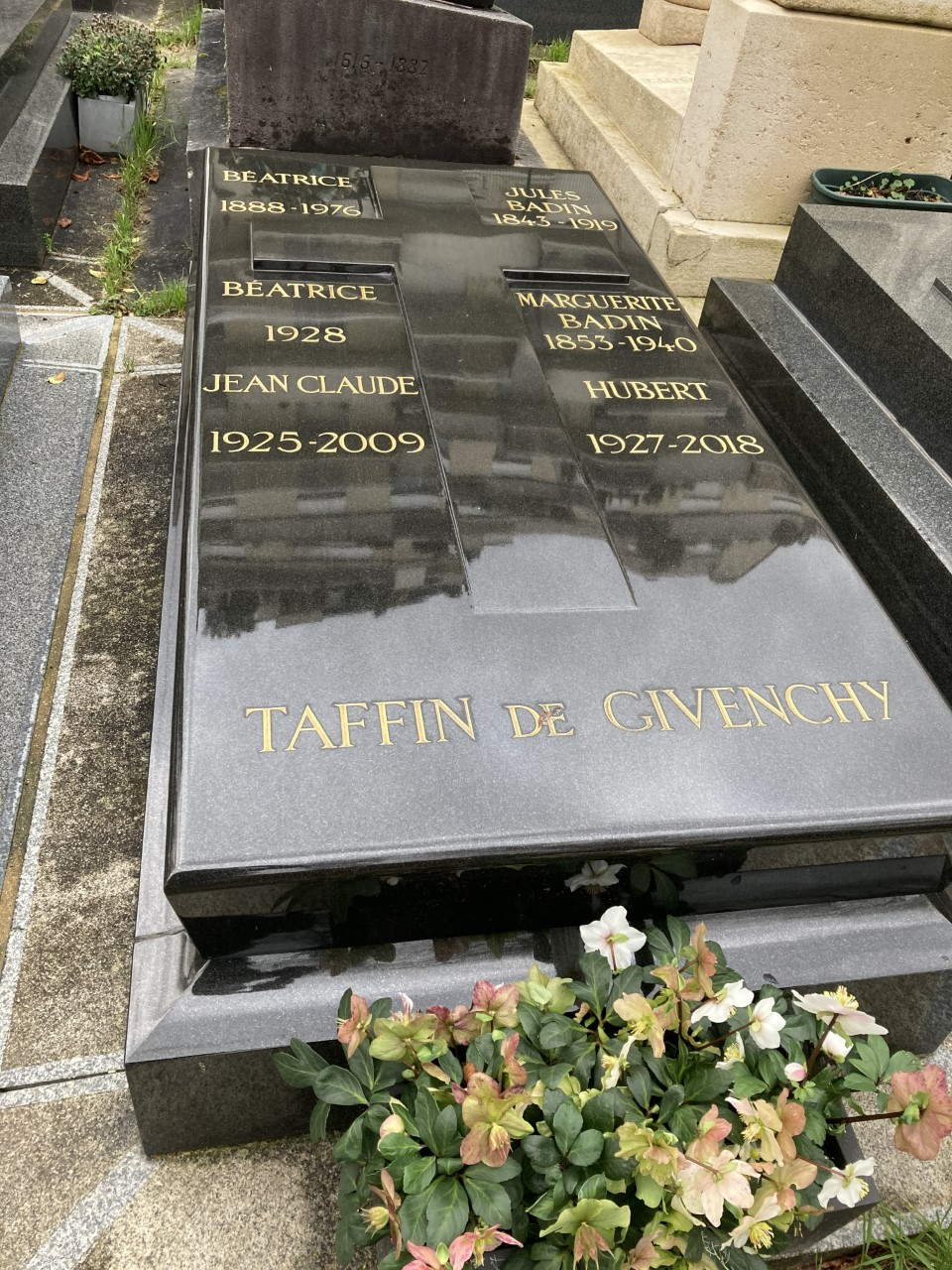
Grave in Passy Cemetery

Givenchy retired from fashion design in 1995.

Givenchy resided at the Château du Jonchet, a listed historic castle in Romilly-sur-Aigre, Eure-et-Loir, near Paris. In his retirement, he focused on collecting 17th and 18th-century bronze and marble sculptures. In July 2010, he spoke at the Oxford Union. From 8 to 14 September 2014, during the Biennale des Antiquaires, he organized a private sale exhibition at Christie's in Paris featuring, artwork by Jean-Baptiste-Claude Odiot, the Manufacture nationale de Sèvres, Jacques-Louis David, and Anne-Louis Girodet de Roussy-Trioson, etc.

In January 2007, the French Post Office issued postage stamps for Valentine's Day designed by Givenchy. In October 2014, a retrospective exhibition featuring ninety-five of his designed pieces took place at the Thyssen-Bornemisza Museum in Madrid, Spain.

His longtime partner was fashion designer Philippe Venet.

Hubert de Givenchy died in his sleep at the Renaissance chateau near Paris on Saturday 10 March 2018. He was 91 and was buried in Passy Cemetery in Paris.

== Pioneer for Black models in haute couture ==
Five Black American women comprised Givenchy's house models in the late '70s. It was the first time a couture house explicitly asserted that Glamour was not reserved for a white elite. With the exception of Sophie Malgat, Givenchy's house models were exclusively Black.

One of the models, Sandi Bass, stated that after her first season at Givenchy, nearly every designer dreamed of featuring a beautiful Black model on the runway. "It was a frenzy, and we were in demand in Paris, Milan and Rome during show season."

"Mr. Givenchy was a pioneer in making this phenomenon extraordinary in the world of fashion in Paris. And there was no focus about diversity. The reason these girls were chosen was because [of] their attitude, there was a different attitude and energy in those personalities."

— André Leon Talley, Women's Wear Daily, 1979

== Bibliography ==
- Françoise Mohrt, The Givenchy Style (1998), Assouline. ISBN 2-84323-107-8
- Pamela Clarke Keogh, Hubert de Givenchy (introduction): Audrey style (1999), Aurum Press. ISBN 1-85410-645-7
- Jean-Noël Liaut: Hubert de Givenchy : Entre vies et légendes (2000), Editions Grasset & Fasquelle. ISBN 2-246-57991-0
