= Parfums Givenchy =

French brand of perfumes and cosmetics

- Founded: May 31, 1957; 69 years ago in Beauvais, France
- Founder: Hubert de Givenchy
- Products: Perfumes, Cosmetics
- Parent: LVMH
- Website: givenchybeauty.com

Parfums Givenchy (French: [paʁfœ̃ ʒivɑ̃ʃi]) is a French brand of perfumes and cosmetics, known for fragrances L'Interdit, Amarige, Organza, Pi, and Givenchy III. As part of Givenchy, it has been a subsidiary of LVMH since 1987.

== Presentation ==
The Givenchy perfume brand belongs to the LVMH luxury group since 1987. It has two factories in France. A perfume production plant (50%) and cosmetics (50%) located in Beauvais in the Oise (about 400 employees) opened in 1968 and a perfume plant located in Vervins in the Aisne (about 250 employees) in 1995.

== History ==
Givenchy was founded in 1952 by designer Hubert de Givenchy, who retired in 1995. Known first for his haute couture work, Givenchy founded Les Parfums Givenchy in 1957. This business division was primarily managed (and owned) by his elder brother Jean-Claude de Givenchy who previously was an airline executive with Air France in New York City. He left the company shortly after being sold to France's Institut de Développement Industriel in 1979. In 1958, Hubert de Givenchy asked his friend Audrey Hepburn to be the face of his parfume, L'Interdit, which only she was allowed to wear for a full year. He created a revolution in using, for the first time, a movie star on an advertising campaign.

Monsieur de Givenchy and l'Eau de Vetiver were launched in 1957 and 1959, respectively, followed in 1970 by the launch of the female fragrance Givenchy III with the slogan "Who knows why one is reminded of a particular woman and not another one? Givenchy III gives memories to men." The success of Parfums Givenchy led to the construction of a factory in Beauvais.

Famous patrons include the Guinness, Grimaldi and Kennedy families, who famously wore Givenchy clothes to the funeral of John F. Kennedy.

Hubert de Givenchy created the “4G” logo for the brand and a cosmetic line launched in the United States.

Some of Givenchy's successful fragrances include Ysatis, Amarige, Organza, Very Irresistible, Ange ou Démon, Dahlia noir (2011) for women, and Monsieur de Givenchy (first fragrance for men, 1959), Gentleman, Pi, Givenchy pour Homme, Vetyver and Play for men.

In May 2019, a first-ever pop-up Givenchy beauty suite opened its doors to the visitors of the 2019 Cannes Film Festival, where the guests of the Cannes Film Festival could get their Givenchy makeover ahead of the red carpet premiere. This was part of an effort to revitalize the cosmetics line.

== The perfumes ==
In 2000, in order to contribute to the revival of the brand, Parfums Givenchy appointed designer Pablo Reinoso as artistic director of the company. The stylist Riccardo Tisci, artistic director of the Givenchy house from 2005 to 2017, participated in the creations of Givenchy perfumes following the departure of Reinoso from the group in 2006. Since May 2017, artistic direction has been provided by Clare Waight Keller, until in April 2020.

Date	Fragrance	Perfumer
1957	L'Interdit	Francis Fabron
1957	Le De Givenchy	
1959	Monsieur de Givenchy	Francis Fabron
1970	Givenchy III	Jean-François Latty and Raymond Chaillan
1974	Gentleman (renamed Givenchy Gentleman Originale)	Paul Leger
1980	Eau de Givenchy	Daniel Moliere and Daniel Hoffmann
1984	Ysatis	Dominique Ropion
1986	Xeryus	Alberto Morillas
1991	Amarige	Dominique Ropion
1993	Insensé	Daniel Moliere
1996	Organza	Sophie Labbé
1998	π (Pi)	Alberto Morillas
2000	Hot Couture	Alberto Morillas and Jacques Cavallier-Belletrud
2003	Very Irresistible	Dominique Ropion, Sophie Labbé, and Carlos Benaim
2006	Absolutely Givenchy	
2006	Ange ou Démon	Olivier Cresp and Jean-Pierre Bethouart
2008	Absolutely Irresistible	
2008	Play	Emilie Coppermann and Lucas Sieuzac
2009	Ange ou Démon Le Secret	Bernard Ellena
2010	Play for Her	Emilie Coppermann and Lucas Sieuzac
2011	Very Irresistible Givenchy L’Intense	
2011	Dahlia Noir	François Demachy
2014	Dahlia Divin	François Demachy
2015	Live Irrésistible (limited edition)	Dominique Ropion and Claire Liégent
2018	L'Interdit Eau de Parfum	Dominique Ropion, Anne Flipo, and Fanny Bal
2020	Irresistible Givenchy	Fanny Bal, Dominique Ropion, and Anne Flipo
