= Beauvais Manufactory =

Tapestry factory in Beauvais, France

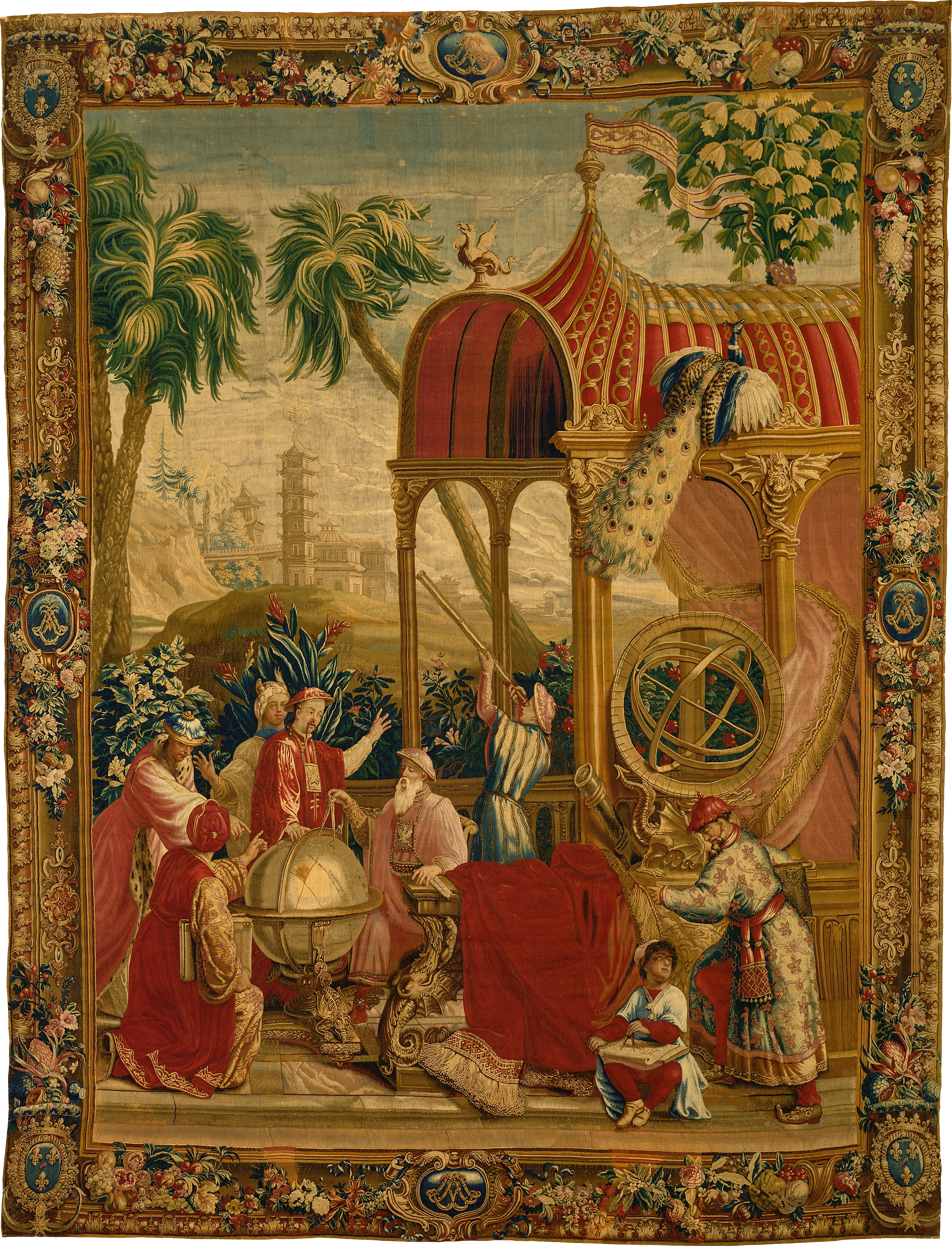
Astronomers of the Jesuit China missions with Chinese scholars, Les Astronomes, Beauvais tapestry,1697-1705.

The Beauvais Manufactory (French: Manufacture de Beauvais) is a historic tapestry factory in Beauvais, France. It was second in importance, after the Gobelins Manufactory, of French tapestry workshops that were established under the general direction of Jean-Baptiste Colbert, the finance minister of Louis XIV. Whereas the royal Gobelins Manufactory executed tapestries for the royal residences and as ambassadorial gifts, the manufacture at Beauvais remained a private enterprise. Beauvais specialised in low-warp tapestry weaving, although the letters patent of 1664, authorising the company and offering royal protection, left the field open for the production of high-warp tapestry as well.

== History ==
The first entrepreneur, Louis Hinard, a native of Beauvais who had already established workshops in Paris, produced unambitious floral and foliate tapestries called verdures and landscape tapestries, which are known through chance notations in royal accounts. He was arrested for his debts in 1684, and the workshops were refounded more successfully under Philippe Behagle, a merchant tapestry-manufacturer from Oudenarde, who had also worked in the traditional tapestry-weaving city of Tournai. Behagle's first successes were a suite of Conquests of the King which complemented a contemporaneous Gobelins suite showing episodes in the Life of the King, without directly competing with them. A suite of Acts of the Apostles, following copies of Raphael's cartoons, are in the cathedral of Beauvais. The so-called Teniers tapestries, in the manner of village scenes painted by David Teniers the Younger, began to be woven under Behagle and continued popular, with up-dated borders, into the eighteenth century, when the earliest series of archives begin.

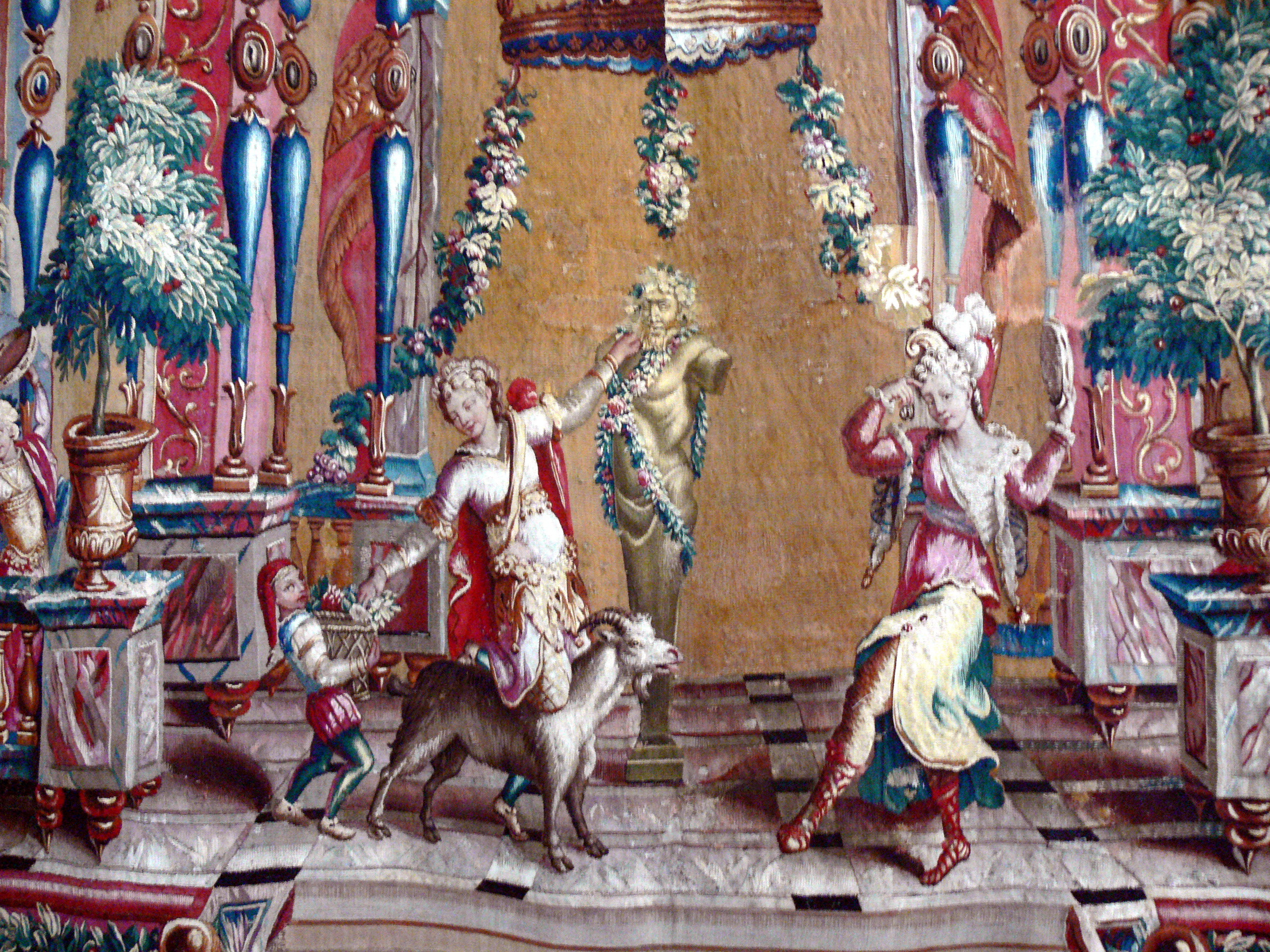
Tapestry from the suite of "Bérain Grotesques" (detail), made under the Behagles, c.1700 (Kronborg)

The great series of Grotesques (illustration, left) initiated in the 1690s became a mainstay of Beauvais production, woven through the Régence. The cartoons, which were inspired by the engravings of Jean Bérain the Elder and were carried out to cartoons by Jean-Baptiste Monnoyer, a painter attached to the Gobelins factory, were based on fanciful grotteschi. Against mustard yellow grounds vases and baskets of fruit with birds, a specialty of Monnoyer's, are contrasted with lively figures, sometimes acrobats and dancers, sometimes from the Commedia dell'arte in slender and fanciful arabesque architecture.

Behagle continued his private workshops in Paris, as had his predecessor. From these shops came the suite of Marine Triumphs with the arms of the comte de Toulouse. On his death in 1705, the Beauvais manufacture was continued by his wife and son, and in 1711 by new proprietors, the brothers Filleul. Under Filleul ownership Beauvais produced suites of The story of Telemachus and Ovidian Metamorphoses as well as animal combats, and a series of "Chinese" hangings that are a high point in the career of chinoiserie. Between 1722 and 1726, Beauvais was directed by Noël-Antoine de Mérou, and maintained showrooms in Paris, and in Leipzig and Ratisbon (Regensburg), for Beauvais found many commissions among foreigners.

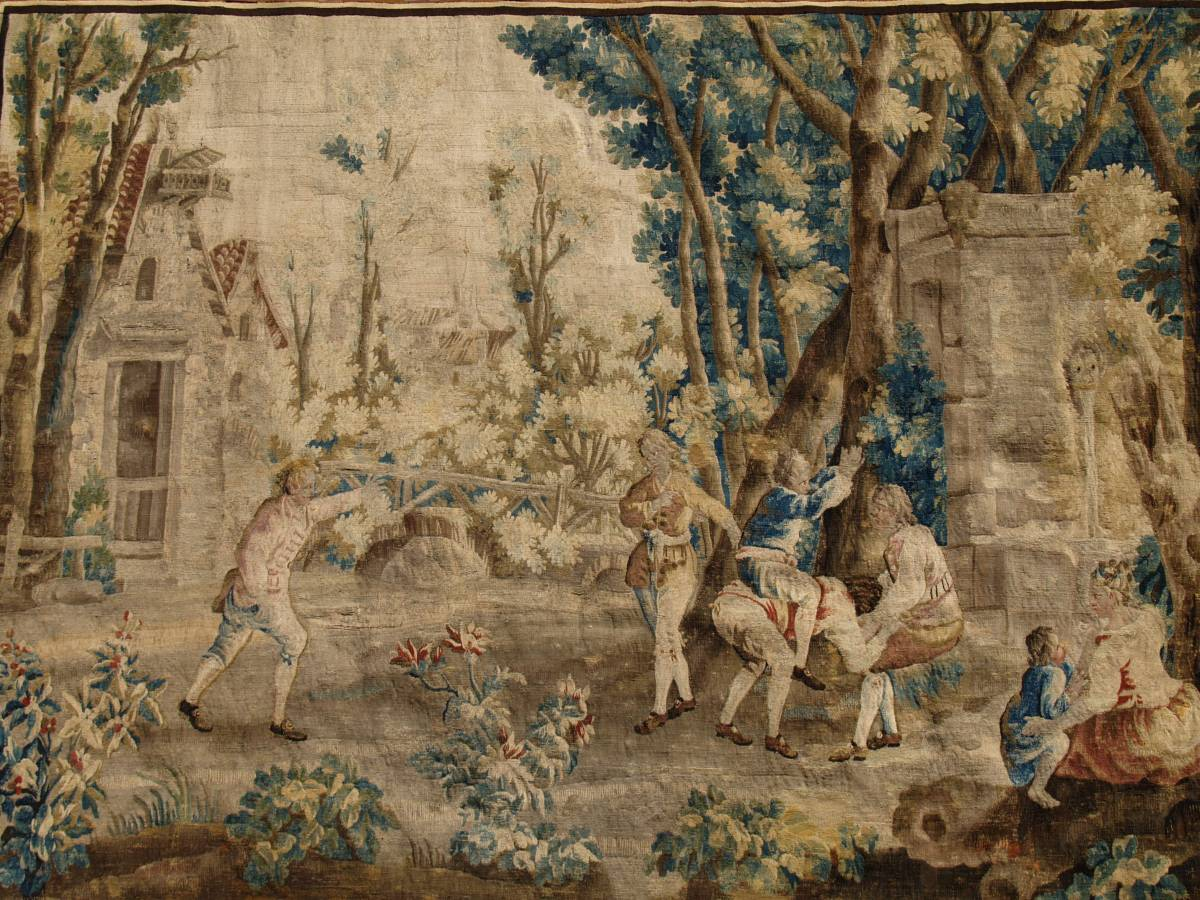
Le Cheval fondu from the series of Amusements Champêtres for which Oudry provided cartoons in the 1720s

The great period of Beauvais tapestry begins with the arrival of Jean-Baptiste Oudry, 22 July 1726, replacing the unsatisfactory Jacques Duplessis. When Mérou was dismissed in 1734 for falsifying the accounts, for the first time the manufacture was directed by an artist, since Oudry's financial backer, Nicolas Besnier, a goldsmith of Paris, was wise enough not to interfere with the artistic production, and the partnership lasted until 1753. Oudry was simultaneously inspector of the works at Gobelins. At Beauvais he reorganized the training of the young workers and turned out designs and constantly renewed borders: the New Hunts, the suite of Country Pleasures, the hangings illustrating Molière's comedies, a renewed suite of perennially popular Metamorphoses. Sets of tapestry covers for seat furniture were introduced, and in September 1737 it was decided that the King of France should purchase two sets of tapestry each year, for 10,000 livres, for gifts to foreign ministers, an advertisement of French hegemony in the field of art and also a fine advertisement for the quality of the Beauvais manufacture. The king had the entire production of Gobelins at his disposal, but as Edith Standen points out, they were rather large, rather solemn and definitely old-fashioned. In 1739, for the first time, cartoons for Beauvais were exhibited at the Paris Salon, another way of keeping the tapestry workshops before the public eye.

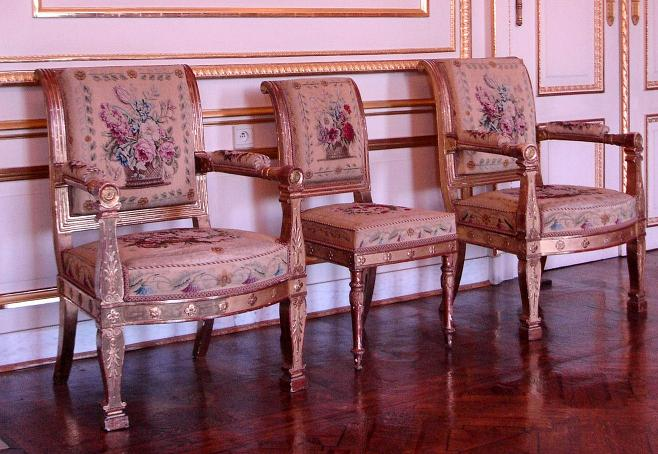
Beauvais tapestry upholsters seats given by Louis-Philippe as a wedding gift to his daughter, 1832

Oudry turned to other artists to supplement the tapestry cartoons he was producing; from Charles-Joseph Natoire's designs Beauvais wove the suite of Don Quichotte, and from François Boucher, starting in 1737, a long series of six suites of tapestry hangings, forty-five subjects in all, constituting the familiar "Boucher-Beauvais" suites that embody the rococo style: the Fêtes Italiennes, a set of village festivals in settings evoking the Roman Campagna, the Nobles Pastorales, a further suite of six chinoiseries, now in a lighter, Rococo handling. Boucher's eight oil sketches for these Tentures chinoises were shown in the Salon of 1742;. It was unusual for the artist's sketches to be enlarged to provide cartoons, as in this case; the translation to cartoons was made by Jean-Joseph Dumons de Tulle. The successful series was woven at Beauvais at least ten times between July 1743 and August 1775; in addition further copies were made at Aubusson.

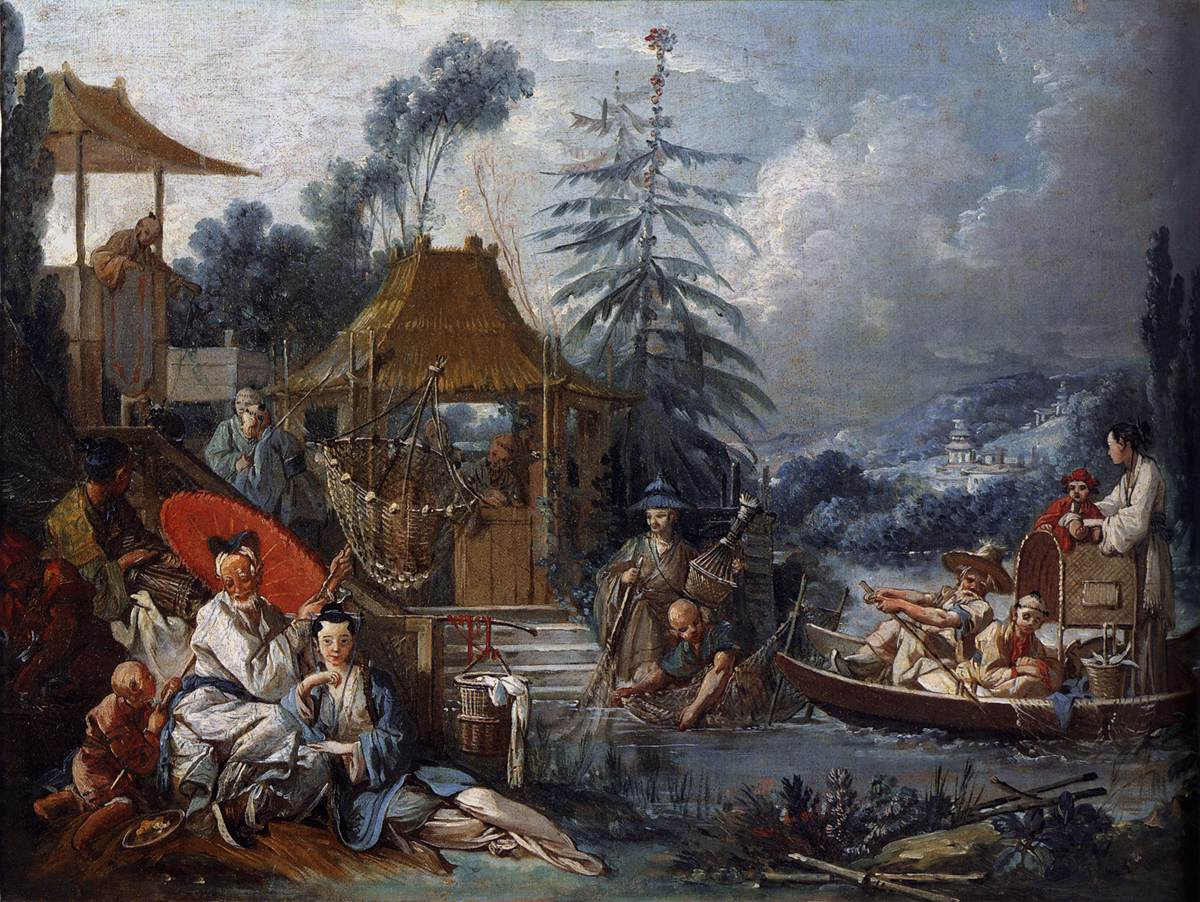
La pêche chinoise, 1742, one of Boucher's chinoiserie designs woven at Beauvais (Musée des Beaux-Arts et d'archéologie de Besançon)

Boucher also designed for Beauvais the Story of Psyche and at the apex of the lot, the Amours des Dieux, the "Loves of the Gods", after paintings by Boucher delivered 1747–49; suites from among the nine subjects, though never all subjects in one suite, were being woven at Beauvais as late as 1774.

A new partner, André-Charlemagne Charron, and increased royal support, with annual order for sets of hangings now with complete suites of furniture coverings, to be delivered to the Garde-Meuble de la Couronne or the foreign ministry should have launched new successes for Beauvais, but Oudry's death, 30 April 1755, and Boucher's defection to the Gobelins factory the same year, initiated a period of stagnation, while the old designs were repeated, and then decline. At the French Revolution the workshops were temporarily closed, following a dispute between the weavers and the administration, and then were reopened, under State direction, making little but upholstery covers.
