= Millicent Rogers =

American art collector

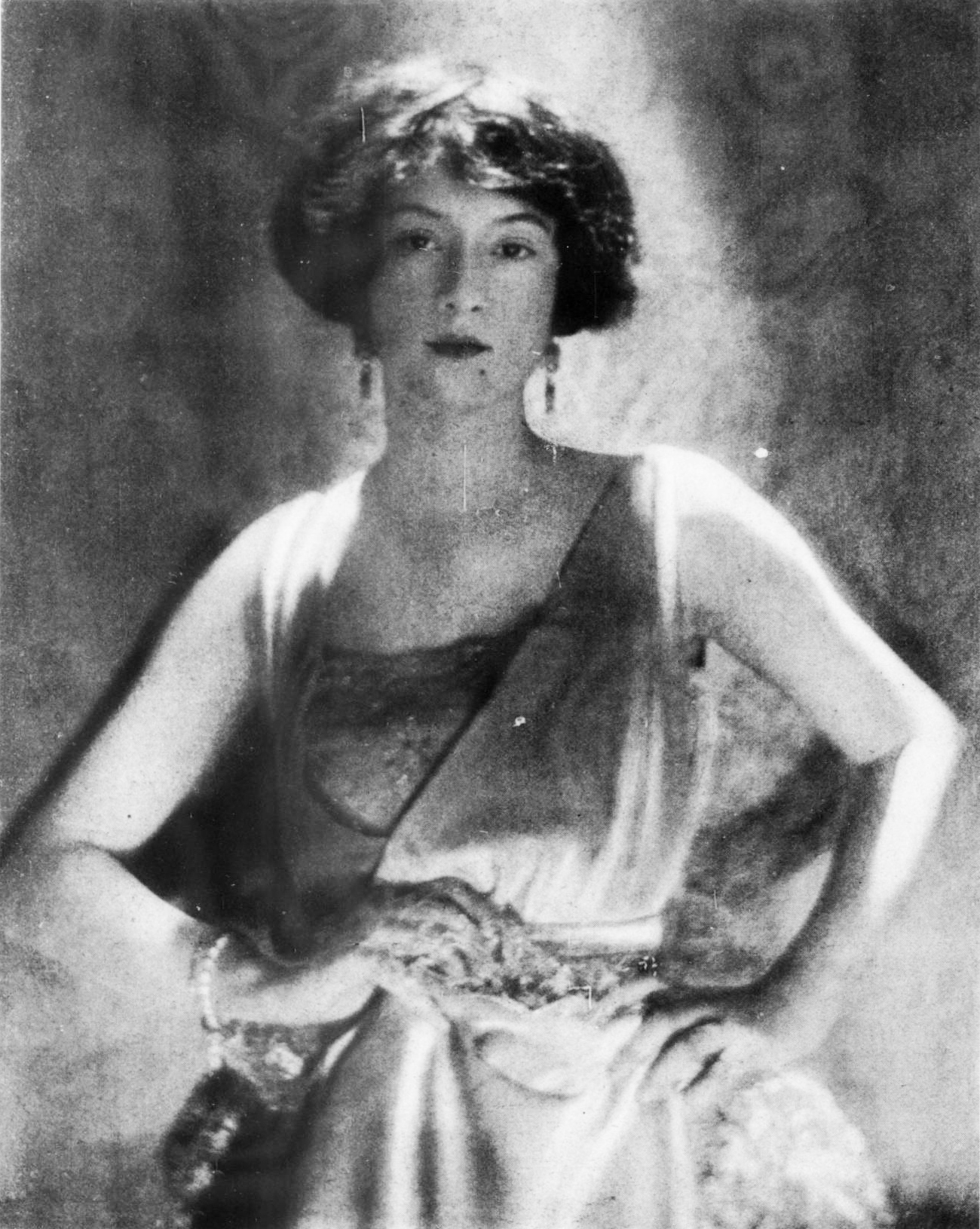
- Millicent Rogers in 1920
- Born: Mary Millicent Abigail Rogers; 1 February 1902; New York City, US
- Died: 1 January 1953 (aged 50); Albuquerque, New Mexico, US
- Resting place: Taos Pueblo, New Mexico
- Occupations: Art collector Jewelry designer
- Spouse(s): Ludwig von Salm-Hoogstraeten; Arturo Peralta-Ramos; Ronald Bush Balcom
- Children: 3
- Relatives: Henry Huttleston Rogers, grandfather

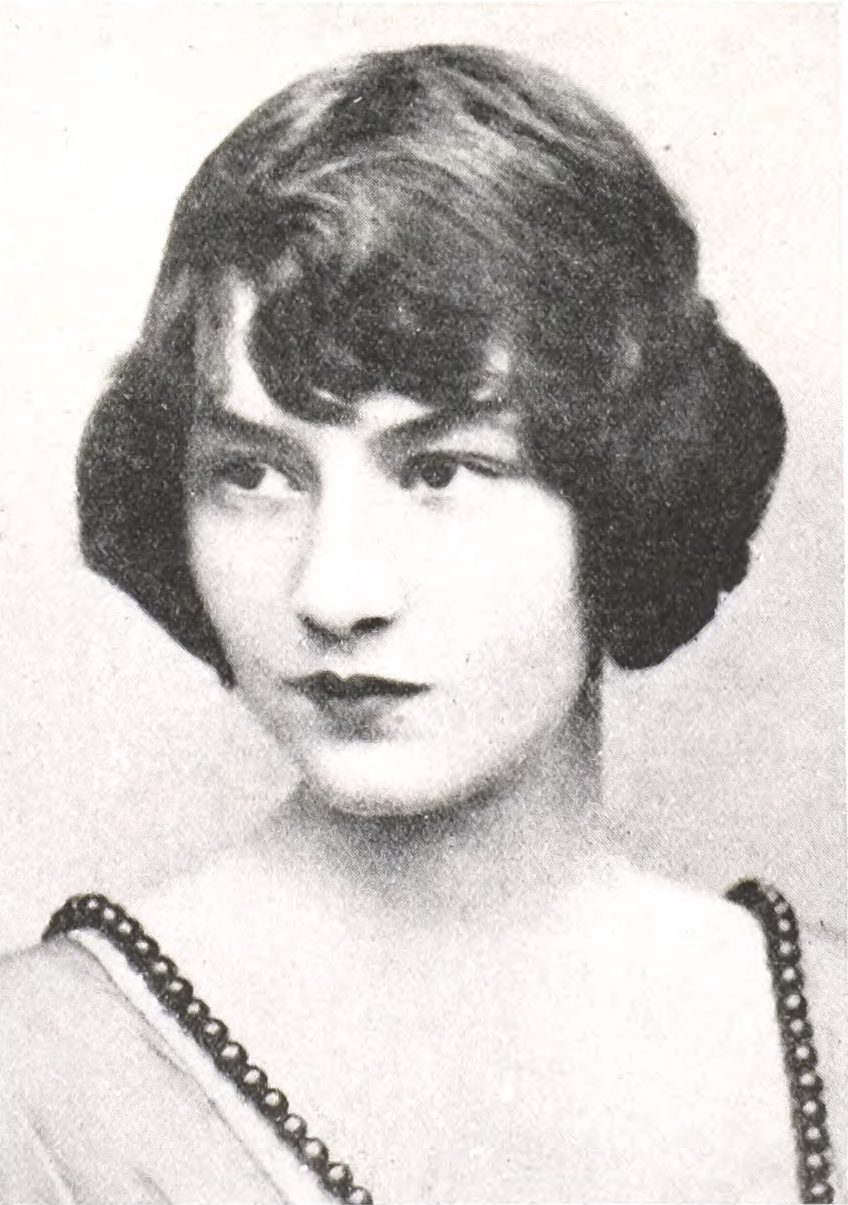
Rogers, age 17

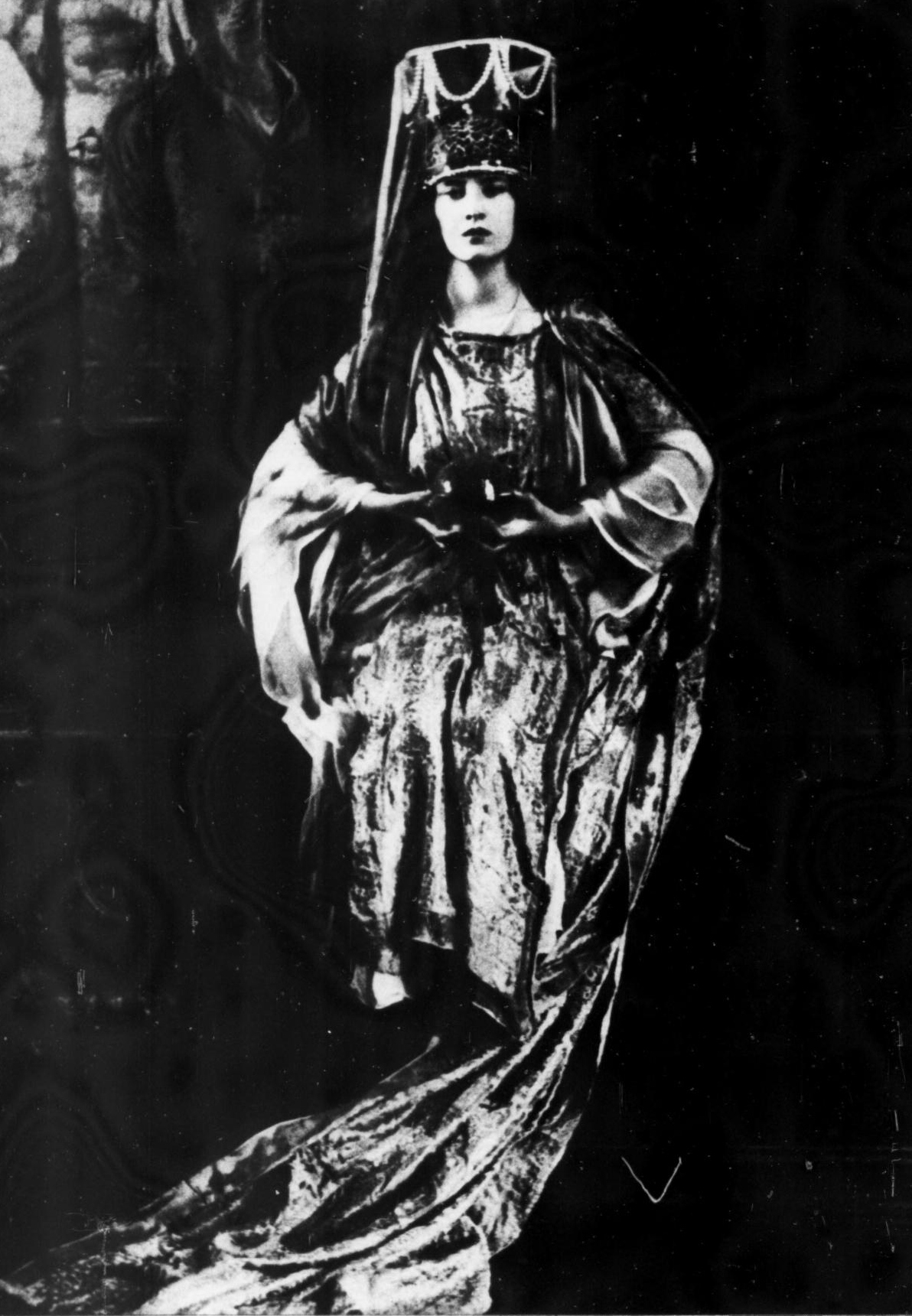
Rogers in Harper's Bazaar, 1919

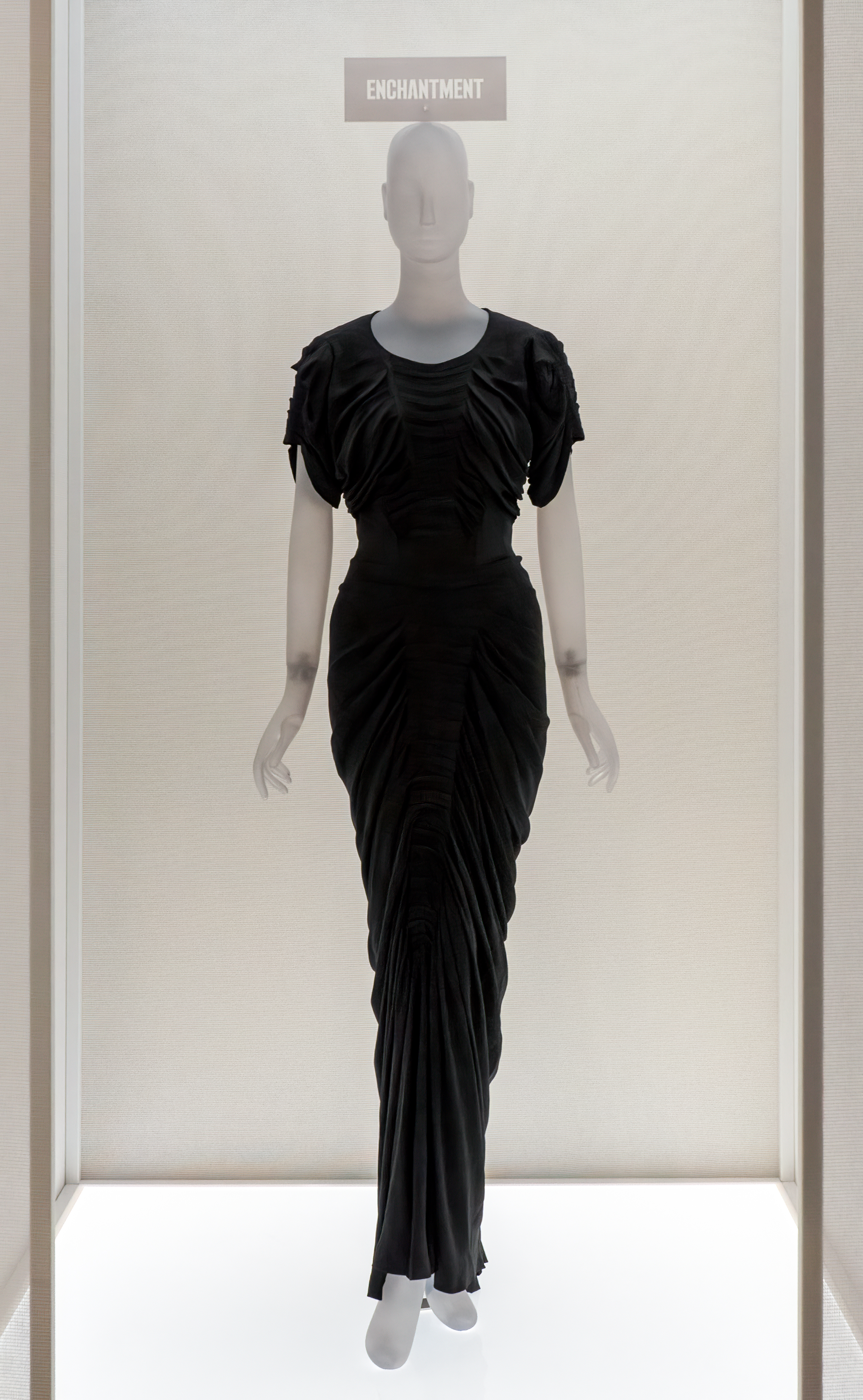
Rogers' "La Sirene" Dress, by Charles James 1922

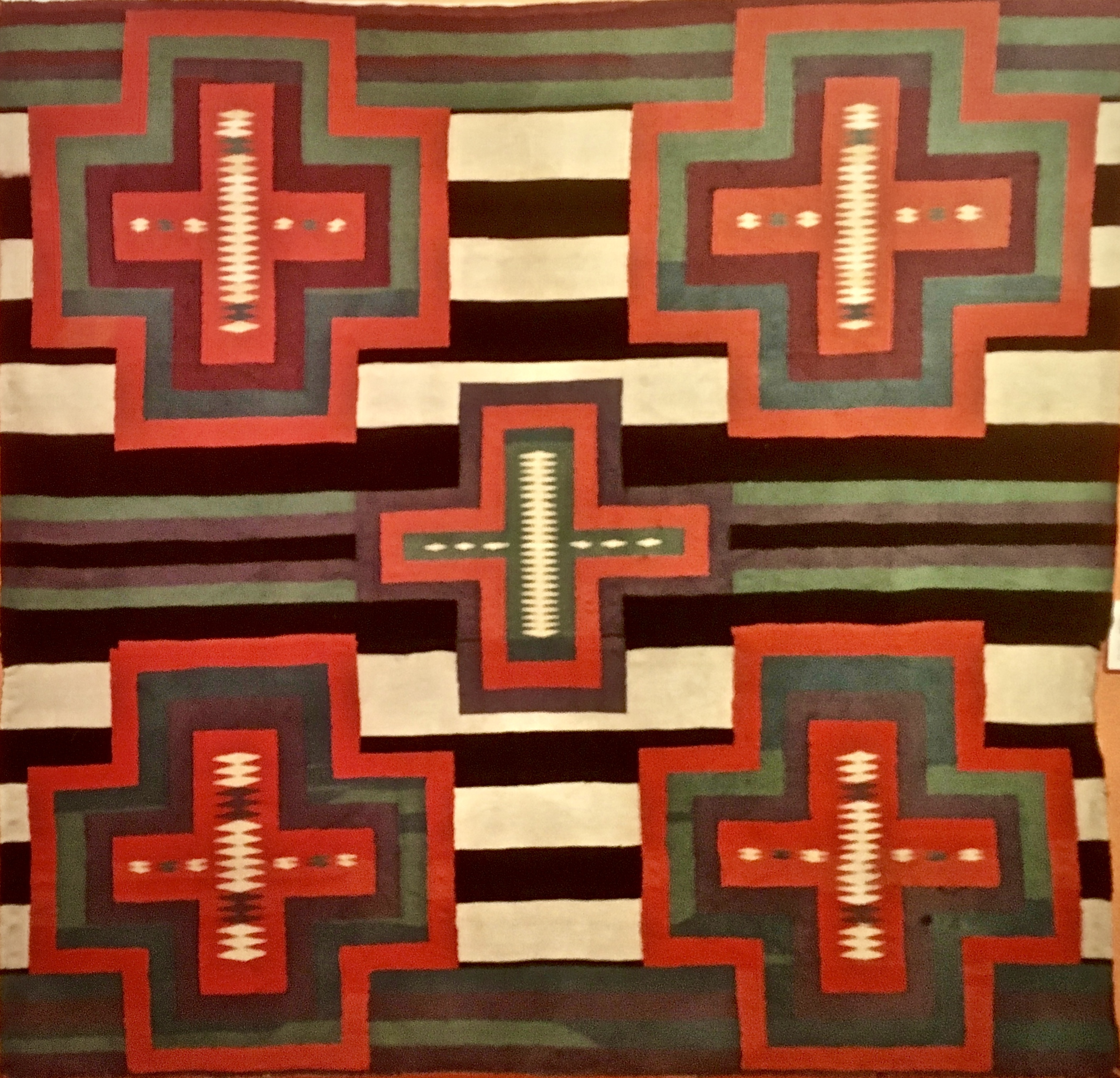
Navajo Blanket, Millicent Rogers Museum

Mary Millicent Abigail Rogers (February 1, 1902 – January 1, 1953) known as Millicent Rogers, was an American socialite, fashion icon, jewelry designer and art collector. She was an early supporter of Southwestern-style art and jewelry, and is credited with promoting it to national and international audiences. She was among the first celebrities to champion the cause of Native American civil rights.

== Biography ==
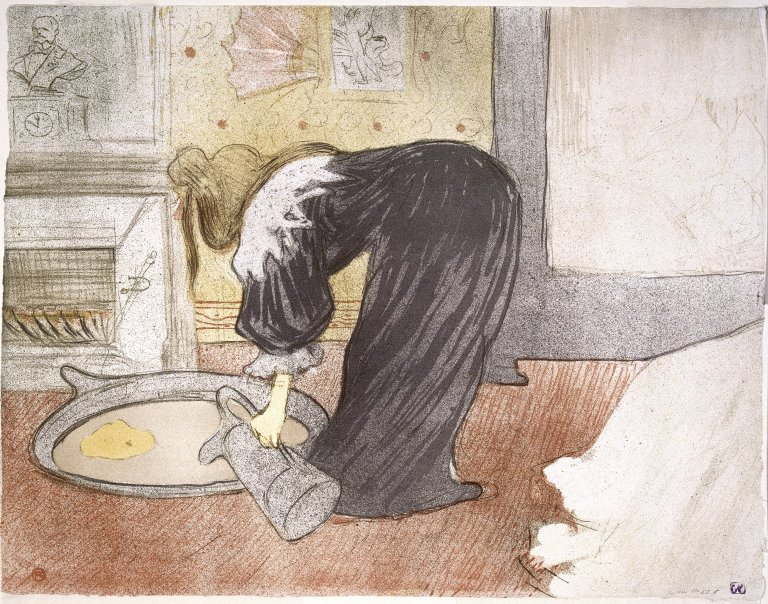
Woman at the Tub, by Toulouse-Lautrec. One of at least a dozen Toulouse-Lautrec works that Rogers donated to the Brooklyn Museum.

Rogers was born February 1, 1902, the eldest of two children born to Mary Benjamin and Henry Huttleston Rogers Jr. Her brother was Henry Huddleston Rogers III. Her mother Mary was a socialite, philanthropist and serious artist who would outlive her children; her father, Colonel Henry Huttleston Rogers Jr., known as 'Harry', was the son of Standard Oil co-founder Henry Huttleston Rogers, and had had a distinguished military career. When his father died, not only did Harry inherit his father's wealth, but he became the sole owner of the Virginian Railway and a director of several other transportation companies. The family was enormously wealthy and divided their time between homes in Manhattan, Georgetown, Tuxedo Park and, in Southampton, an Italianate mansion named Black Point. Mary was an intellectual, refined in the arts, and that is how she raised her daughter. Millicent was well-educated at home, by tutors. At age 8, she contracted Rheumatic fever and was bedridden for some time, which was when she became a voracious reader. She proved to be intellectually precocious—she and her brother shared a facility for languages and communicated with each other in Latin. At age 12, she was sent, as a boarder, to the Madeira School in McLean, Virginia. Seven years later, she made her debut.

In October 1919, before she made her official debut, the Prince of Wales visited New York. The two met at social occasions and became dance partners. While some hoped that they would marry, the greater effect was that Millicent became the focus of the society media. Cecil Beaton described her as "extravagantly beautiful", saying that, although she had excellent taste, she was given to dressing "either as Anna Karenina in sable, as a fragrant Chinese courtesan in mandarin robes, or as Gretel in Tyrolean peasant clothes made by Shiaparelli." She was constantly written about in The New York Times, the New York Journal-American and The Washington Post, and in magazines such as Vogue and Town & Country. One of her earliest appearances was in Harper's Bazaar, which ran a sensational photo of her taken at a fantasy ball at Black Point, costumed as a young queen in a shiny gown with train and headdress. Her official coming out was in November 1919, at one of the grandest balls New York had ever seen.

In the spring of 1920, Rogers became engaged to a young steel company executive, James W. Thompson. After embarking on a European tour with her parents, and breaking off the engagement, she entered into a serious relationship with the Prince Aimone, Duke of Aosta, an heir to the Italian throne; her father disapproved and put an end to it. That was followed by a relationship with the Russian aristocrat Prince Serge Obolensky, who was married.

In January 1924, Rogers eloped with Austrian Count Ludwig von Salm-Hoogstraeten, and they were married in a New York courtroom; she was 22, and the groom was 39. A professional tennis player and aspiring film actor, Salm-Hoogstraeten was characterized by The New York Times as "a gold-digging Austrian count", and Time reported that he was "penniless". The couple had one son, Peter Salm (1924-1994), but separated before the boy was born. The Count was paid $250,000. and their divorce was finalized in April 1927.

On November 8, 1927, Rogers married the Argentinian aristocrat and sportsman Arturo Peralta-Ramos. They were married in the parish house of the Basilica of the Sacred Hearts of Jesus and Mary in Southampton, with only Rogers' father, son, and two friends in attendance. Approving of the marriage, Henry Rogers gave the couple a $500,000 trust fund, with the provision that Peralta-Ramos "lay no future claim to the Rogers fortune, estimated at $40,000,000." The couple lived in Argentina and had two children: Arturo Peralta-Ramos Jr. (1928-2015) and Paul Peralta-Ramos (1931-2003). Peralta-Ramos filed for divorce on December 6, 1935, citing "extreme cruelty".

In 1936, in Vienna, Rogers married Ronald Bush Balcom, an American stockbroker, socialite and champion skier. They lived in a house built by Rogers in the early 1930s, in St. Anton am Arlberg, which Rogers lost to the Nazis when Germany annexed Austria in 1938. They returned to New York, and moved into Rogers' apartment on Sutton Place. The marriage soured and they divorced in February 1941.

Rogers, who had taken nursing courses during World War I, spent the war years in New York, where she created and organized the Medical and Surgical Relief Committee. She also bought and restored the historic estate Claremont Manor, in Claremont, Virginia, turning it into a working farm and offering it as a rehabilitation center for Navy pilots. At Claremont, she had relationships with Secretary of the Navy James Forrestal, and with then-Commander Ian Fleming. Fleming owned a house in Montego Bay, Jamaica; Rogers bought her own house there, Wharf House, where she was visited by friends such as Noel Coward, Cecil Beaton and Roald Dahl, with whom she also had an affair. A more significant relationship was with actor Clark Gable; at war's end, Rogers moved to Los Angeles, where she rented the former Rudolph Valentino mansion, Falcon Lair while working on a house she planned to build for them in the San Fernando Valley—the relationship ended and the project was abandoned.

In 1948, Rogers moved to Taos, New Mexico. She bought an 80-acre ranch with an old adobe house, which she remodeled and called Turtle Walk. She was a life-long artist who had illustrated children's books and made needlepoint rugs. Now, inspired by the art and symbols of the Hopi, Apache, Navajo and Pueblo peoples, she began experimenting with textile design and starting designing bold, sculptural jewelry. She would craft parts of her designs in wax, then hire Pueblo jewelers to complete them; in some cases, she made her own pieces, using pumice stone and nail files. She became a significant collector, purchasing thousands of Native American artifacts, including jewelry, rugs, pottery, tinwork, and santos de palo (wooden saints), plus furniture, paintings and photographs. She was called the Patroness of Northern New Mexico and was credited with creating the "Southwestern Style", both in decor and fashion—she would be buried in an Apache-style Schiaparelli dress.

Rogers became very involved with the Taos community. In 1951, she helped Pueblo members travel to Washington to lay the groundwork for the establishment of the Pueblo Health Center and personally covered its operating expenses. She also began to use her influence in Washington to advocate against Native American poverty, and supported the Pueblo's 1951 claim with the Indian Claims Commission, which included their request that the government return their sacred Blue Lake (it was returned in 1970).

== Death and legacy ==
Rogers' childhood bout with rheumatic fever affected her health for her entire life. She was plagued by pneumonia, and by multiple attacks caused by an enlarged heart which partially crippled her left arm. Following surgery for an aneurysm, she died in St. Joseph Hospital in Albuquerque, New Mexico on January 1, 1953. After a brief ceremony, she was buried in Sierra Vista Cemetery, at the entrance to Taos Pueblo, wrapped in a Navajo wearing blanket and wearing two neo-primitive rings, with her head facing Taos Mountain. The Pueblo came in unprecedented numbers to pay their respects.

Rogers had inherited a great deal of fine art, but she acquired much more, and all of her lavishly decorated homes featured paintings which illustrated her refined taste. Her collection included works by Paul Gauguin, Watteau, Fragonard, François Boucher, George Inness, Winslow Homer, André Derain, Odilon Redon, Toulouse-Lautrec, Van Gogh and Degas. She was also a collector of African art and had an extensive collection of Chinese art, including a teapot which had belonged to Empress Cixi. Rogers donated much of this collection to the Brooklyn Museum and, in 2018, the contents of Turtle Walk was put up for auction. However, as Rogers noted to a friend, her inheritance was not what had been reported and, at her death, she was $3 million in debt.

In 1956, her youngest son, Paul Peralta-Ramos, founded the Millicent Rogers Museum in Taos. The museum houses a large collection of Native American, Hispanic, and Euro-American art, with a specific emphasis on northern New Mexico and Taos. It opened in a temporary location in the mid-1950s, moving in the late 1960s to its permanent location, a home built by Claude and Elizabeth Anderson. It was later remodeled and expanded and, thanks to donations, the museum's collection has expanded from 888 objects to 7,000 items.

== Fashion ==
Rogers was consistently on the world's best-dressed lists and had a significant jewelry collection, favoring bold, sculptural pieces by designers such as Suzanne Belperron, Fulco di Verdura, Paul Flato, and René Boivin. Much of her wardrobe was made for her by the American designer Charles James (who called her a "hoarder"), but she also had close relationships with Jean Patou, Mainbocher, Madame Grès, Valentina, Adrian and, in particular, Elsa Schiaparelli. Her sons donated her fashion collection to the Brooklyn Museum; it was later transferred to the Metropolitan Museum of Art, which holds approximately 500 pieces, including 200 by Schiaparelli. She continues to inspire designers; John Galliano credited Rogers as his muse for his Spring 2010 Dior collection. Diane von Furstenberg did the same for her 2011 American Legends collection.

== Gallery ==
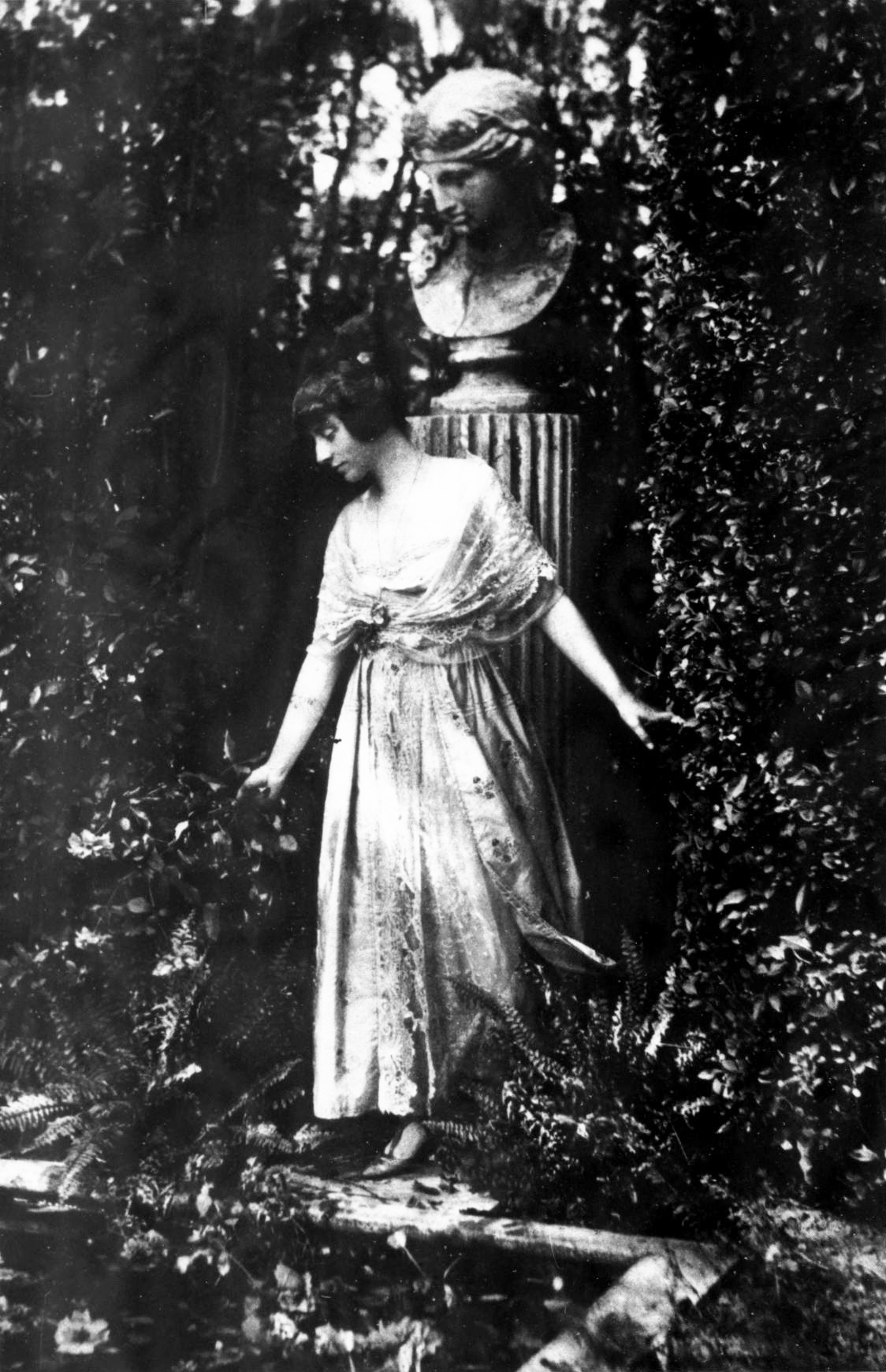
Mary Benjamin Rogers in Harper's Bazaar, 1920

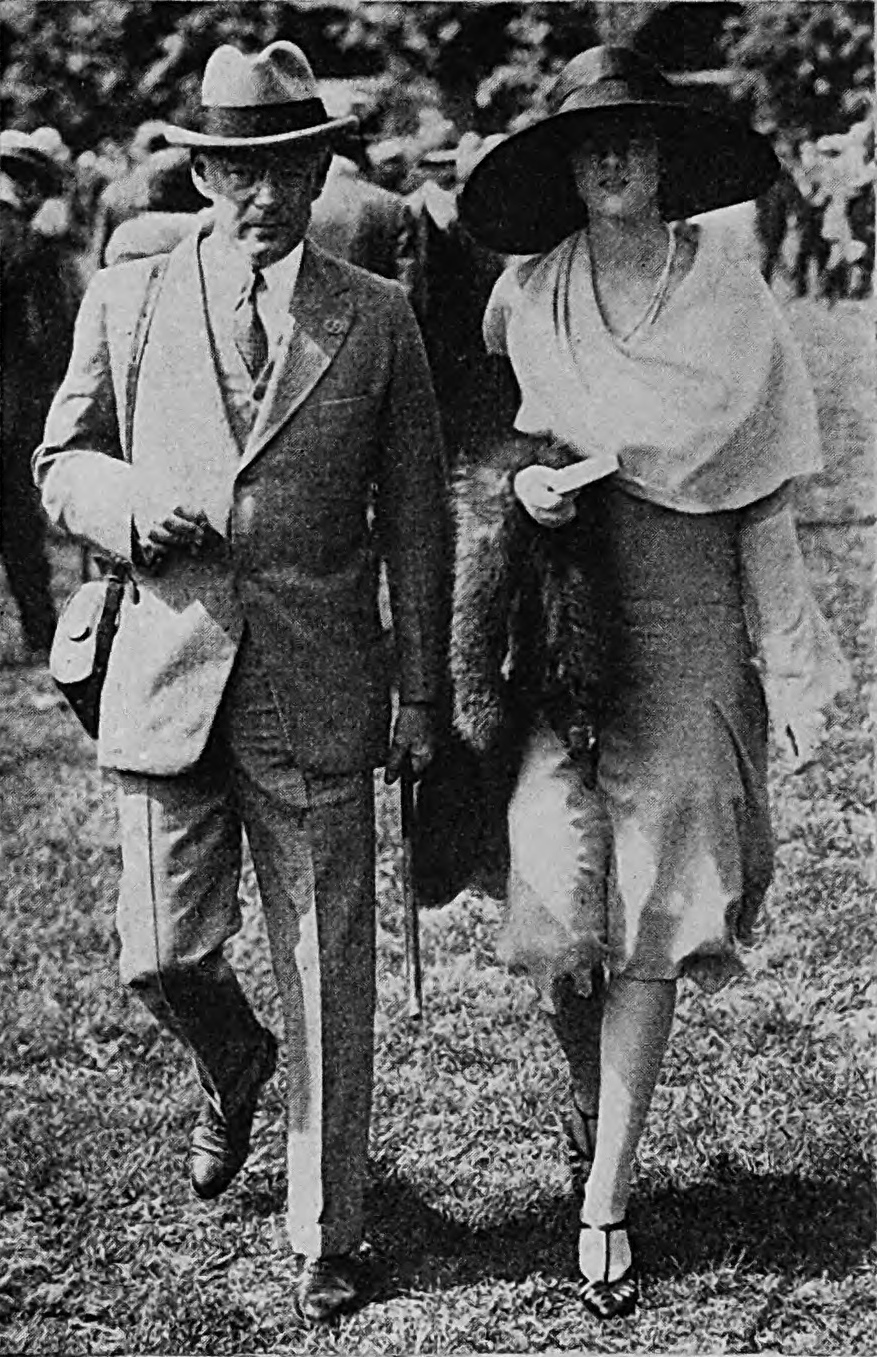
Rogers with her father Harry, 1926

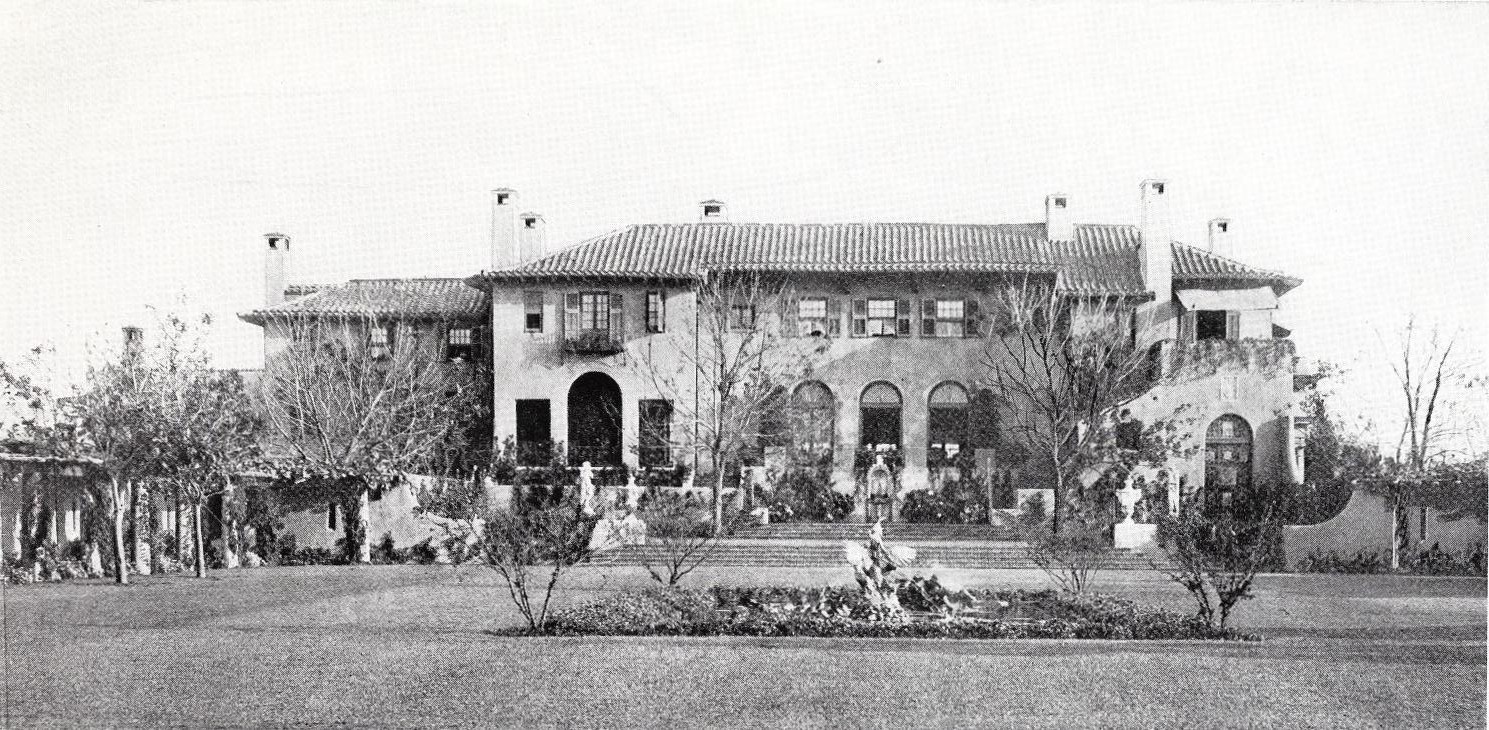
Black Point, Southampton

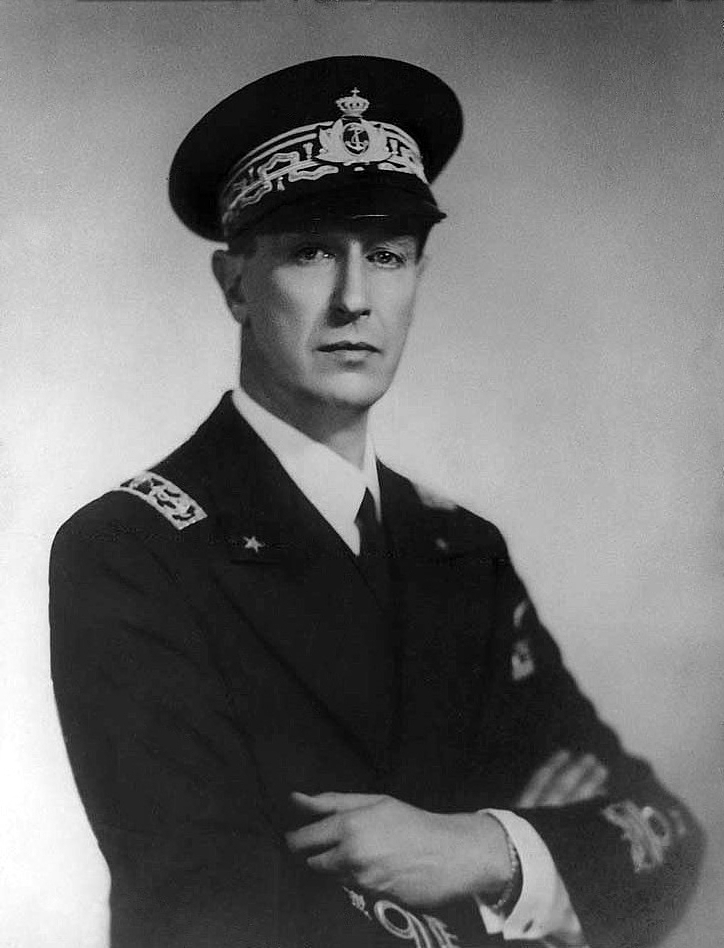
The Duke of Aosta

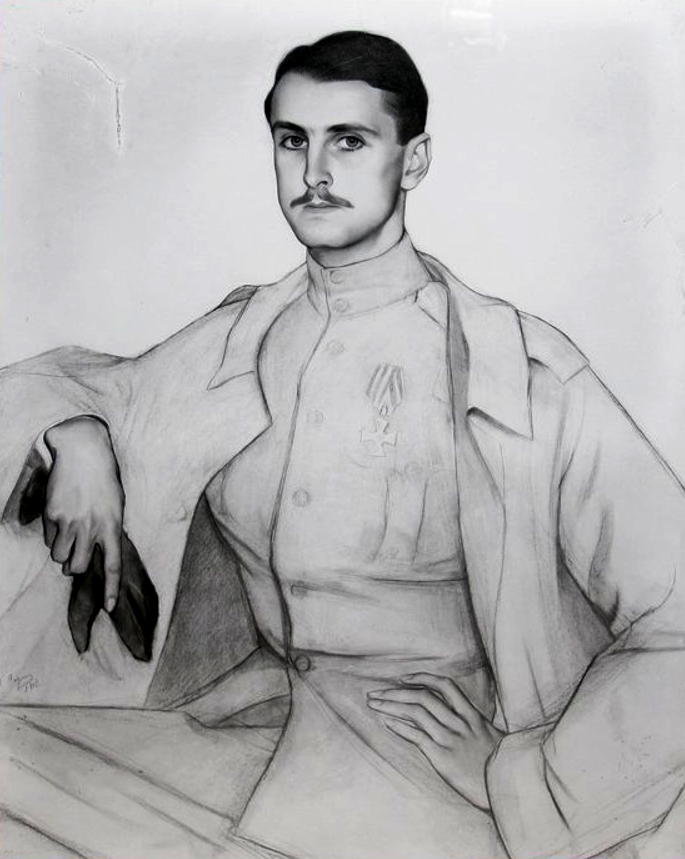
Serge Obolensky

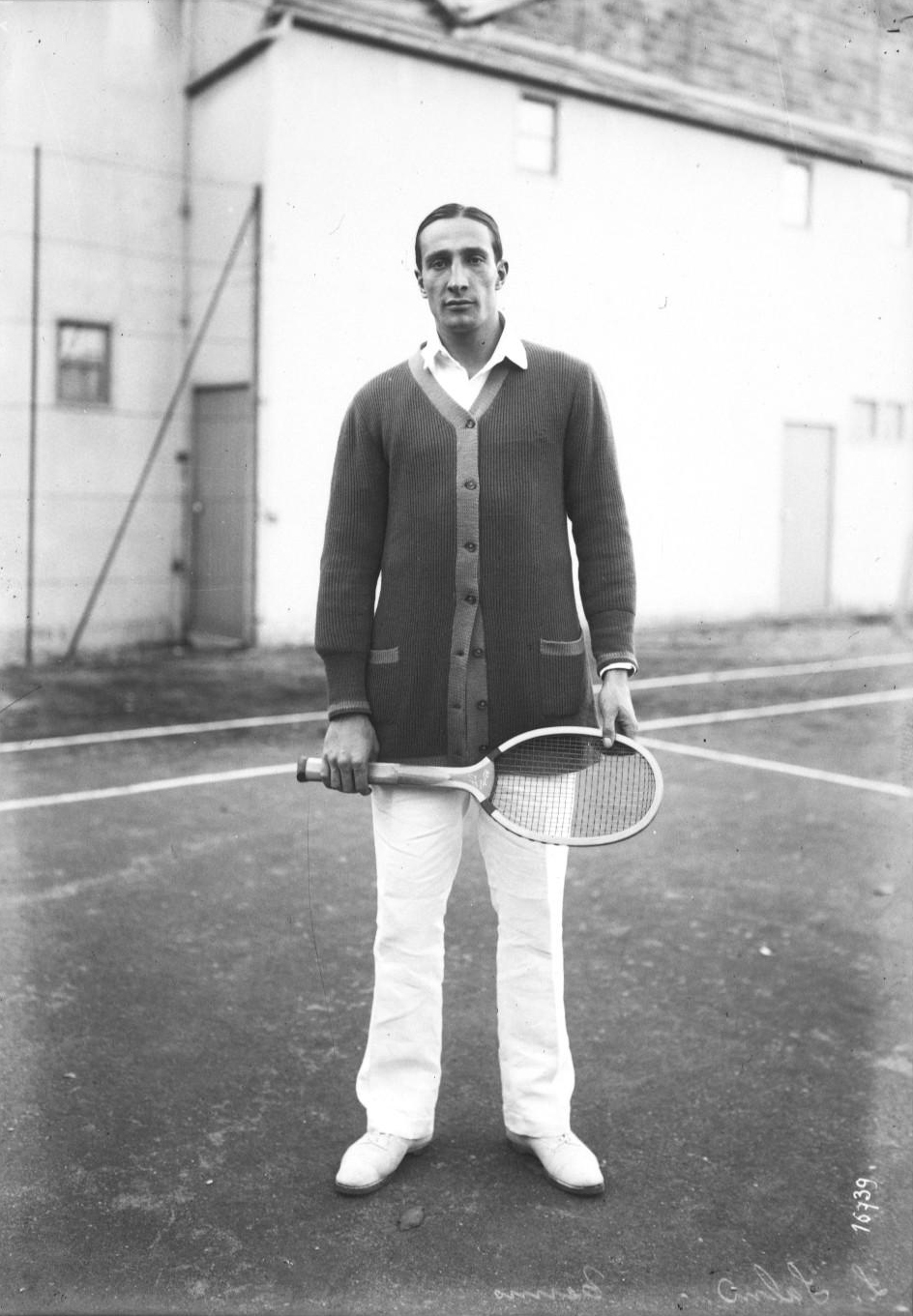
Ludwig von Salm

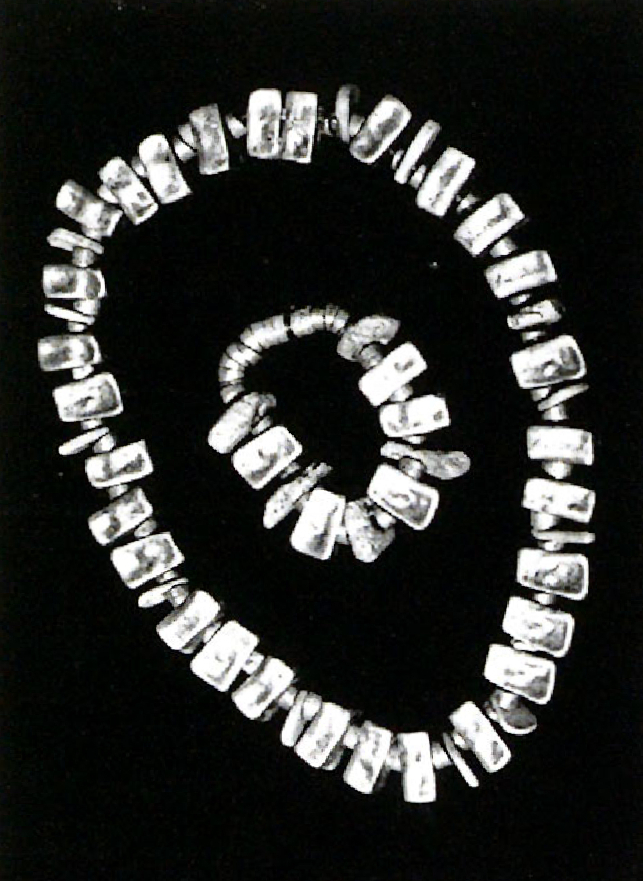
"Winter Silver" by Millicent Rogers

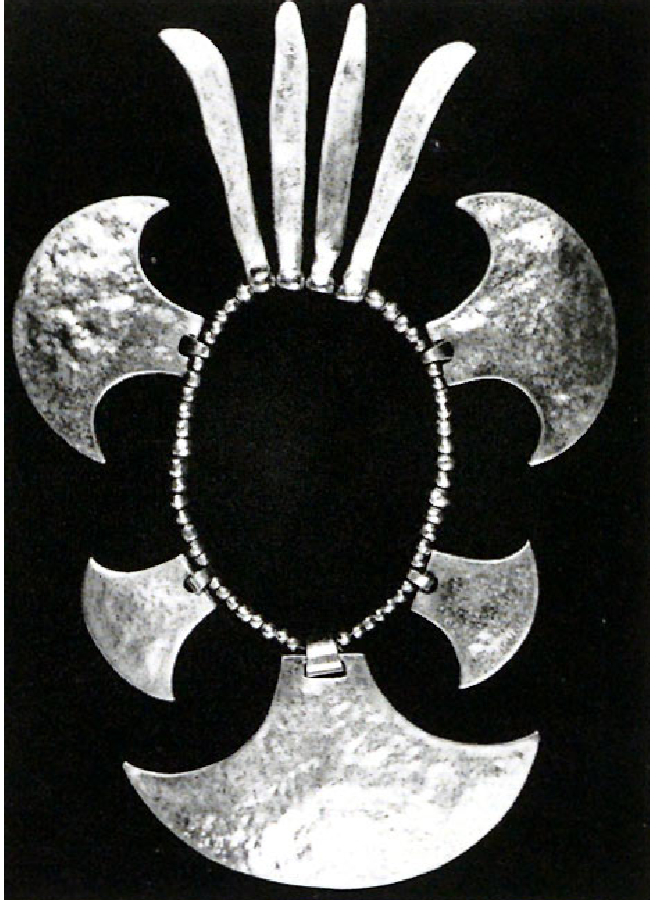
"Figures of Growth" by Millicent Rogers

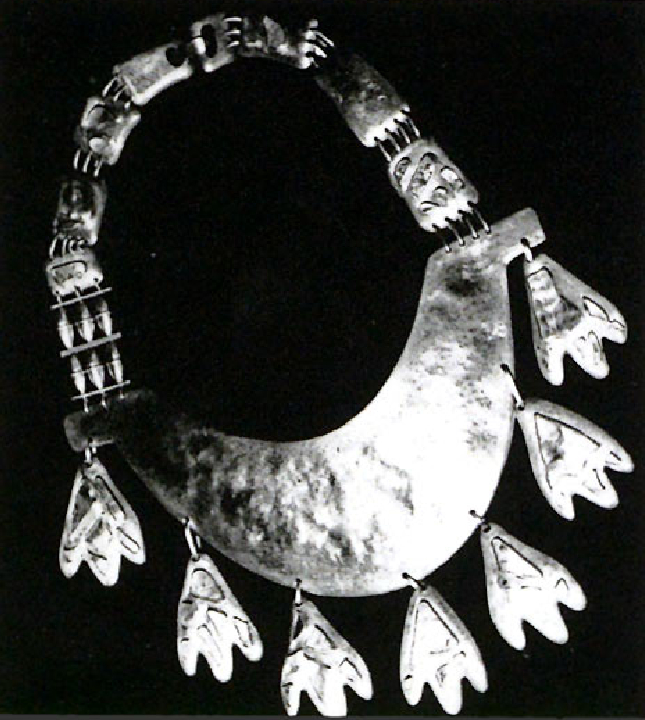
"Cold Sea and Earth" by Millicent Rogers

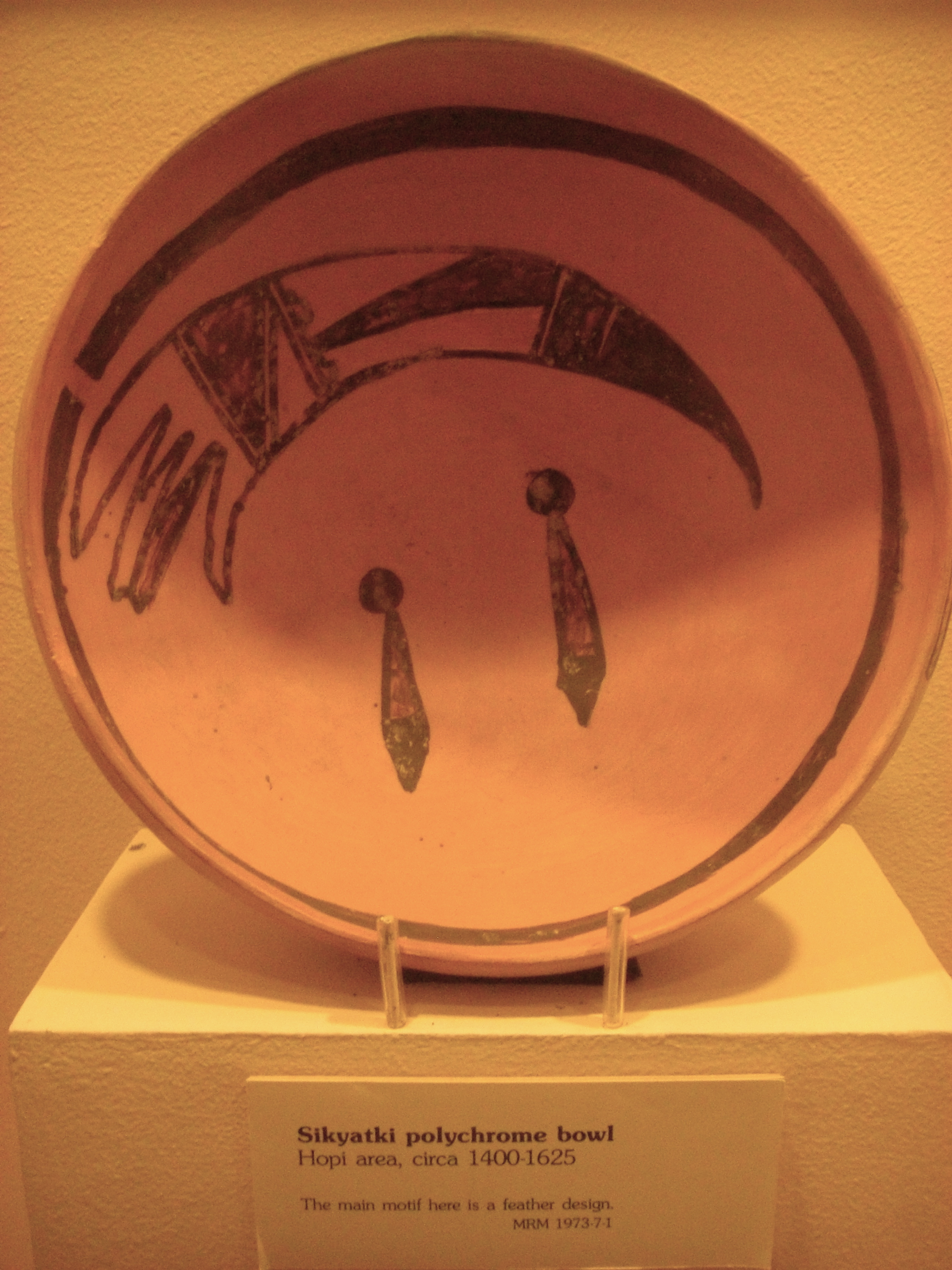
Hopi bowl from Sikyátki, Millicent Rogers Museum

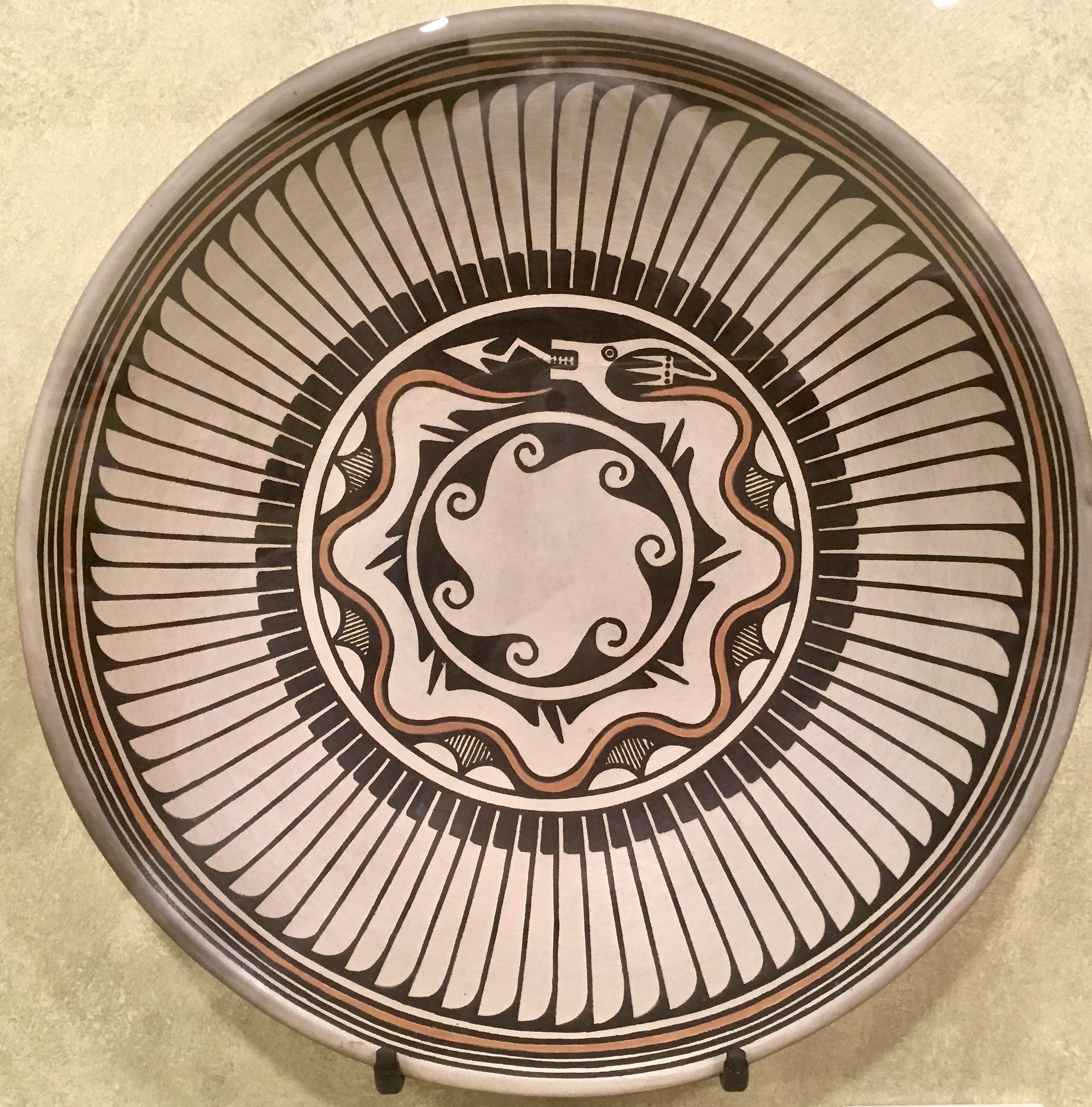
Maria-Popovi Avanyu plate, Millicent Rogers Museum

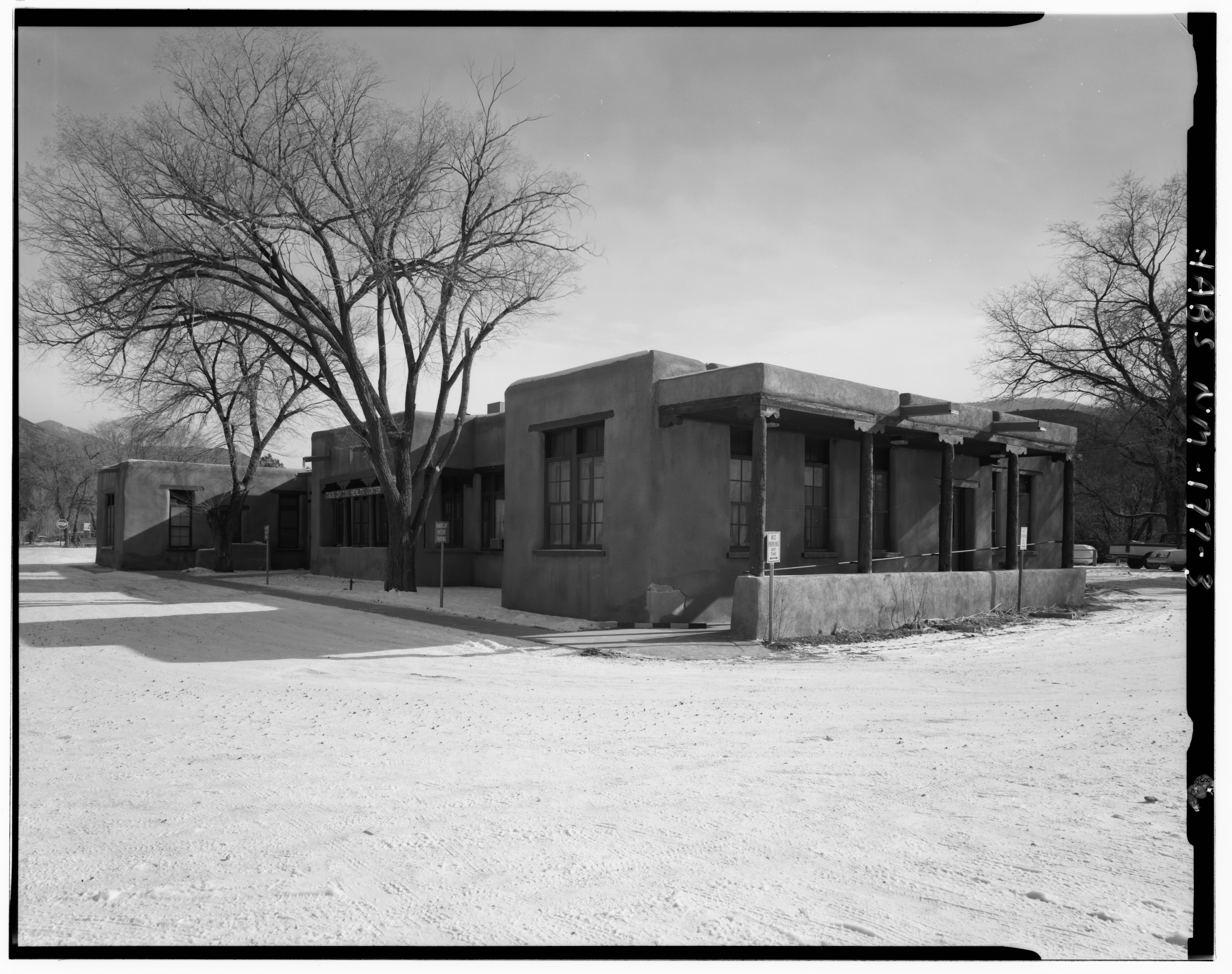
The Taos Indian Health Center

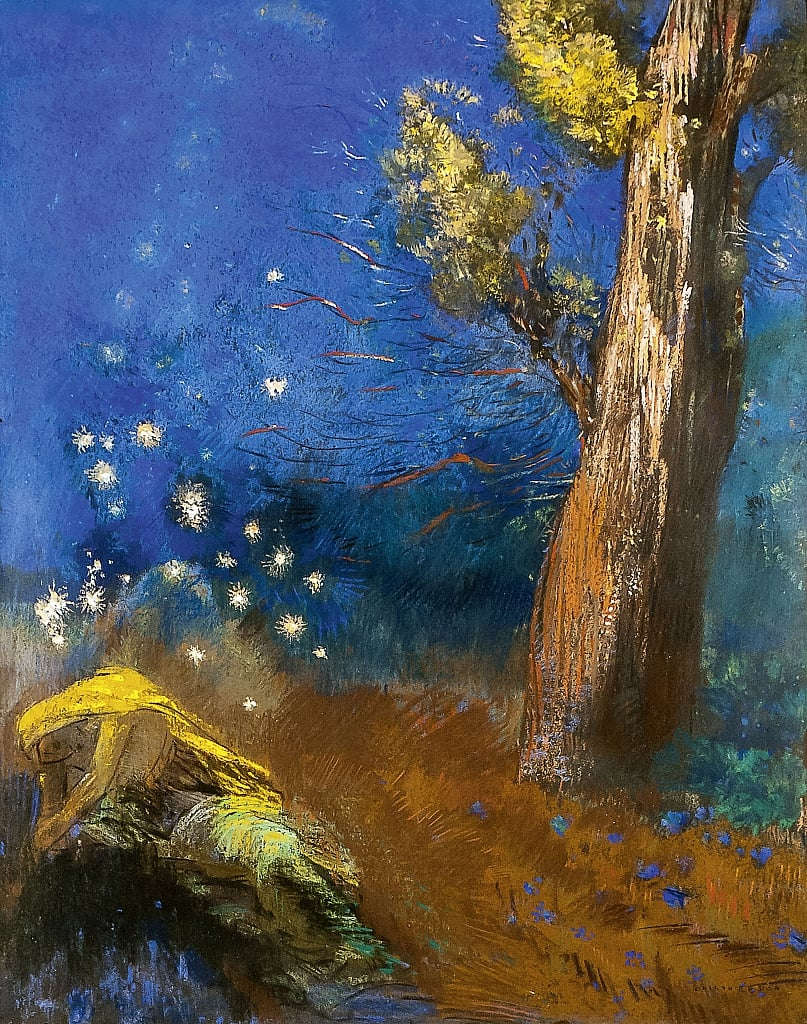
Rogers' La Mort de Bouddha by Odilon Redon

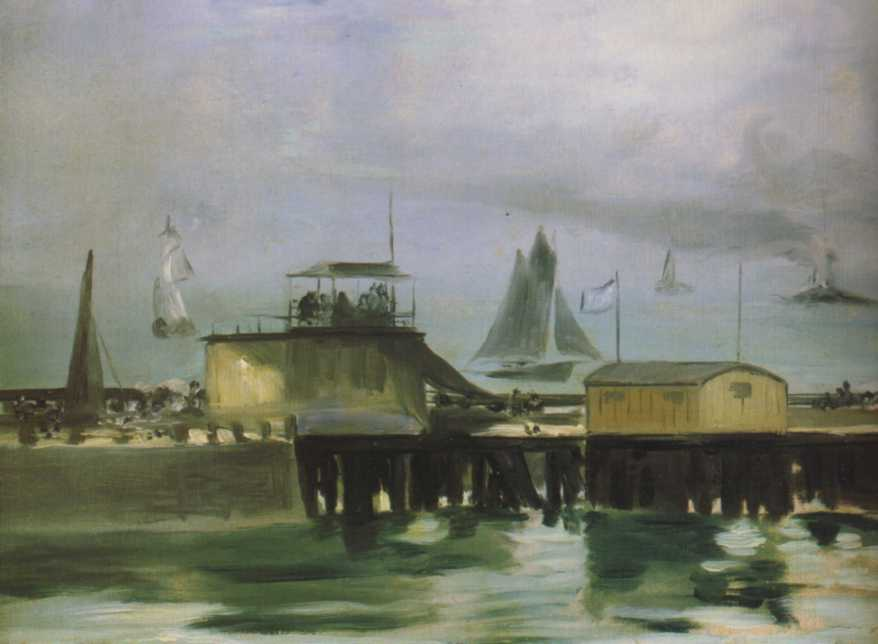
Rogers' La jetée de Boulogne by Édouard Manet

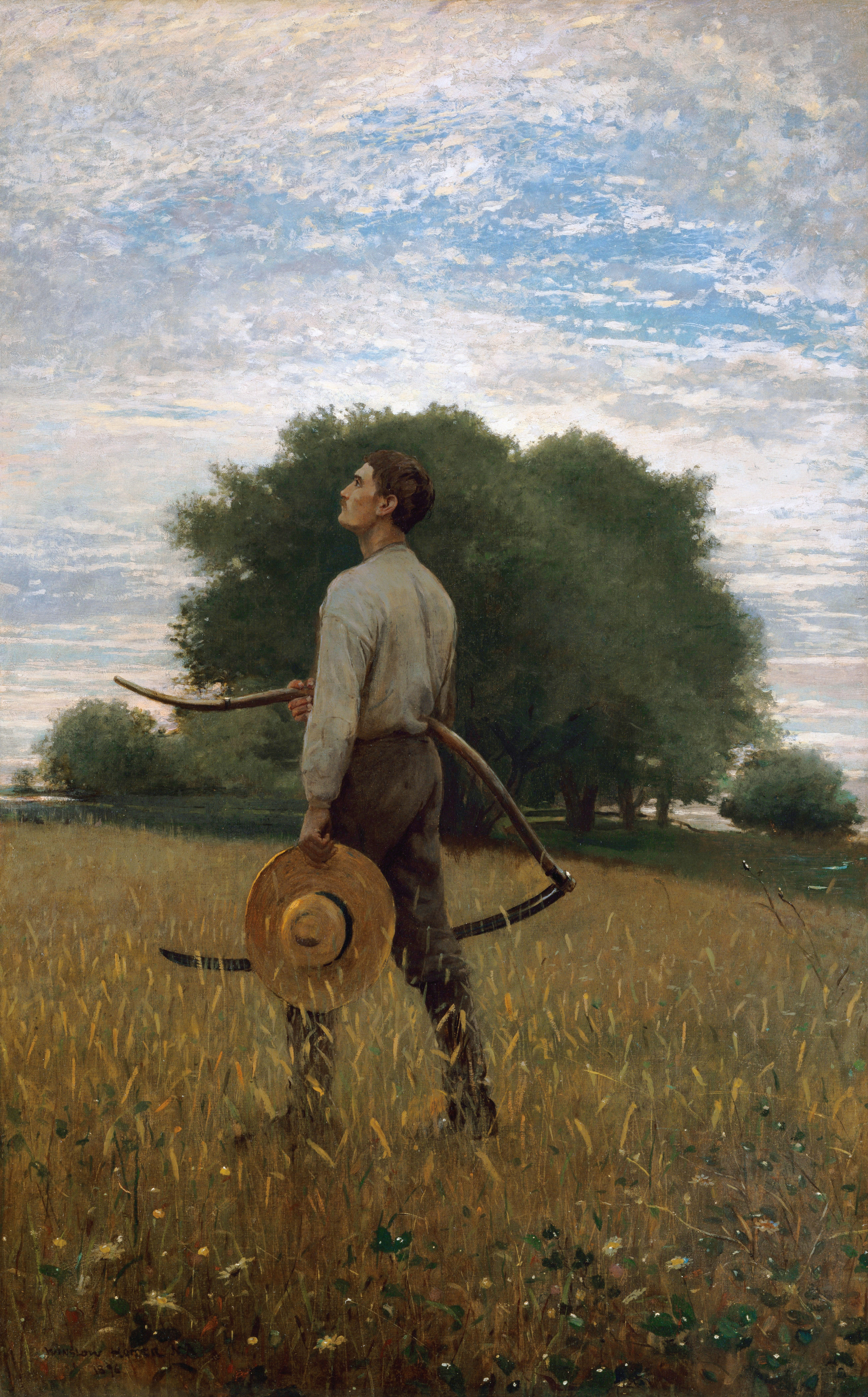
Rogers' Song of the Lark by Winslow Homer

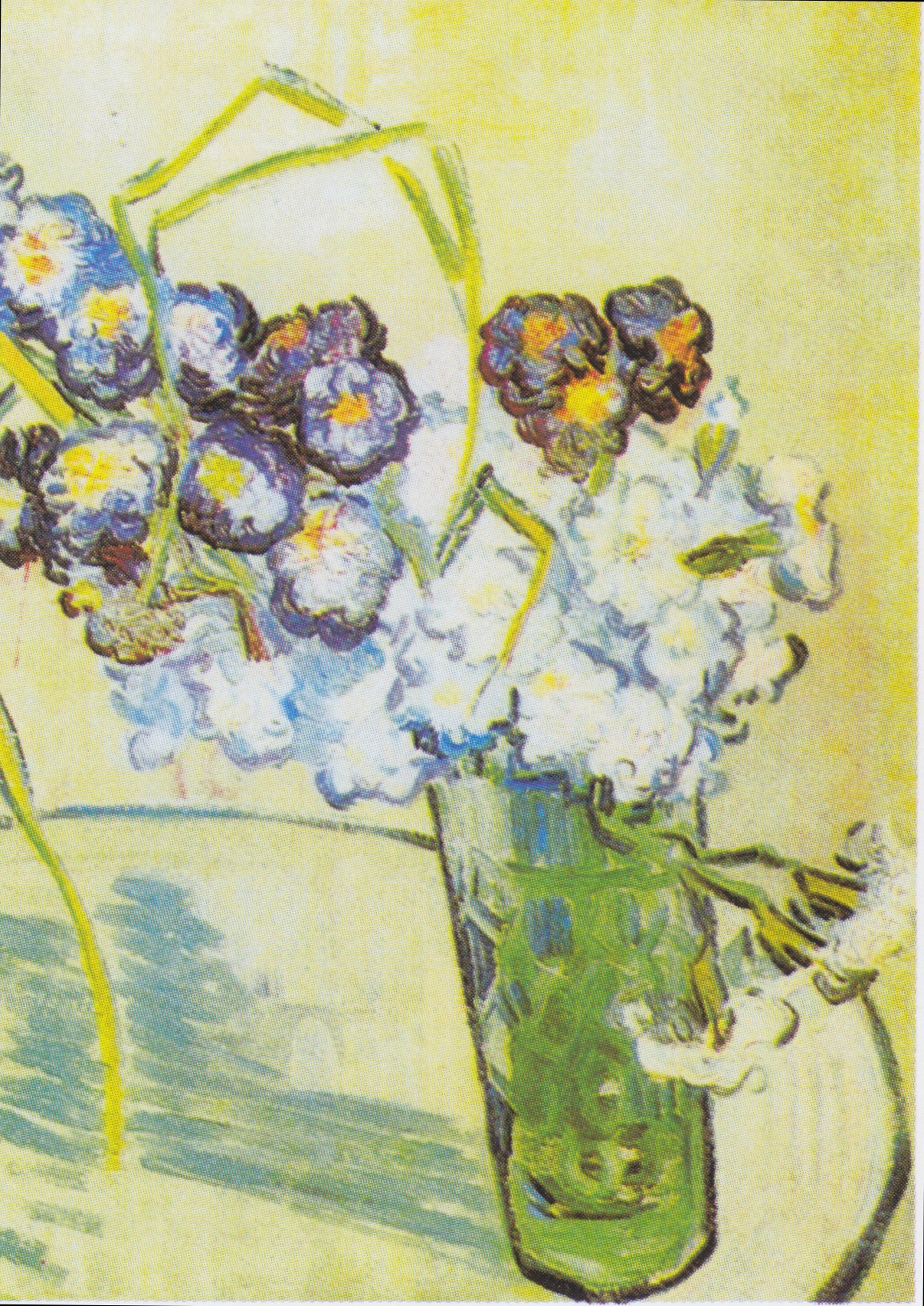
Rogers' Nature morte, vase avec oeillets by Vincent Van Gogh

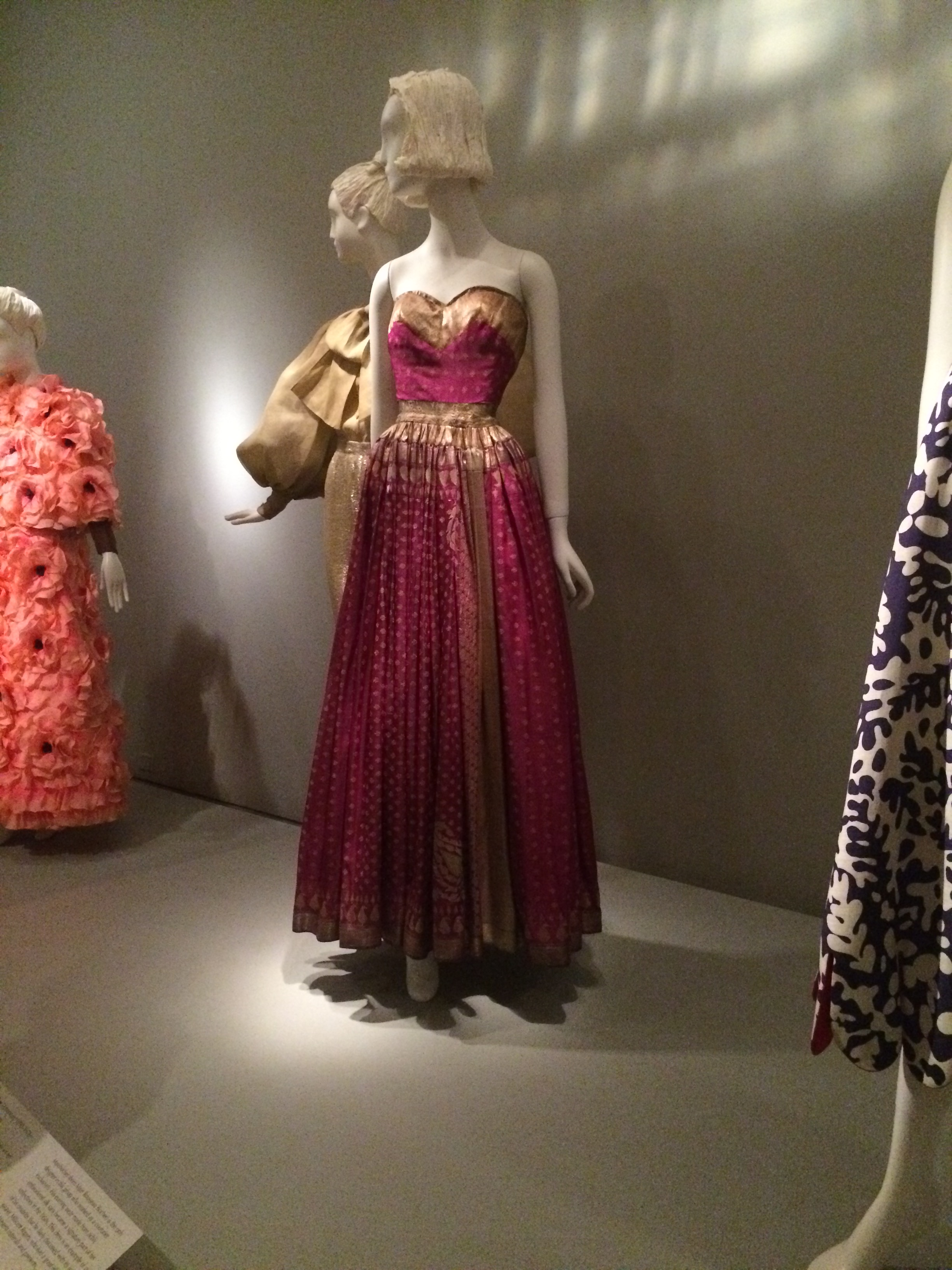
Rogers' Saree Dress by Mainbocher
