= Tony Leonard (photographer) =

Tony Leonard, born Anthony Leonard Bergantino (August 8, 1922 in Cincinnati, Ohio – July 2012) was an American photographer known for his work photographing horses.

== Early life ==
Leonard served in the United States Army during World War II. After that he began working as a singer in nightclubs and on Broadway, most of the time with his wife Adelle who was a dancer. He and his wife, Adelle, came to Lexington, Kentucky to perform at the La Flame nightclub, and decided to stay.

== Career ==
After his time as an Entertainer, he took up photography as a hobby. but what began as a hobby soon turned into a full-time job. His first big break was when he went to Darby Dan farm to photograph Ribot in his paddock, these photos appeared in the Morning Telegraph. Another great accomplishment he had was being the personal photographer of Queen Elizabeth II during her visits to Kentucky. He also worked with Elizabeth Arden, who owned a horse farm. Tony was the last photographer to shoot Secretariat before his death.

== Later life ==
In 2009 Leonard and his wife became wards of the state due to poor finances and declining health. In May 2010, he won a court case to regain control of his photographs. After another medical setback the couple moved to Homestead Nursing Center. In May 2012 he made one last visit to Claiborne Farm, before passing in July. After his death, his photos were showcased at the Headley-Whitney Museum of Art from March 11 – June 19, 2016.

== Notable horses photographed ==
- Secretariat
- Seattle Slew
- Affirmed
- Cigar
- Ribot

== Awards ==
- 1994-Eclipse Award for photography
- 2004-International Photographic Council Lifetime Achievement Award by the United Nations
