= Jeanne Poiret Boivin =

French jewelry designer (1871–1959)

- Born: 1871; Paris, France
- Died: 11 December 1959 (aged 88); Paris, France
- Occupation: Jewelry Designer
- Years active: 1917-1959

Jeanne Poiret Boivin (1871-1959) was a French businesswoman and designer who headed the House of Boivin jewelry firm from 1917 until her death in 1959.

== Early life ==
=== Birth and upbringing ===
Born in Paris, France in 1871 as Jeanne Poiret, the designer grew up in the city's First Arrondissement. Her father, Auguste, worked as a cloth merchant and her mother was well educated for the time. Jeanne was one of four children and her younger brother, Paul Poiret, would go on to be a prominent couturier in Paris at the height of the Jazz Age.

=== Marriage ===
In 1893 Jeanne married René Boivin, a trained goldsmith and engraver. René had worked for his family's business as a goldsmith upon graduating high school and later apprenticed with Parisian craftsmen to learn the trade of jewelry making. He became recognized as a master by the age of 25 and went on to establish his own jewelry workshop. After marrying, the two settled into an apartment near the workshop located at 38 Rue de Turbigo. Over the course of their marriage, the two would go on to have three children together and their daughter, Germaine, would later work in their workshop.

The couple worked to successfully establish their jewelry firm. Jeanne managed the bookkeeping and oversaw the accounts while her husband executed the designs. He was becoming known for his skill in engraving and the firm was gaining popularity. In 1907 they moved the workshop to Rue des Pyramides and settled into a new, spacious apartment on the Boulevard Haussman.

=== Paul Poiret ===
During the beginning of the 20th century, Jeanne's brother Paul Poiret was simultaneously making a name for himself in the fashion industry. The group formed a symbiotic relationship. Paul provided Boivin famous, wealthy clientele and in turn René designed pieces to accessorize his clothing collections. Additionally, Jeanne and René would attend Paul's lavish soirées where they would rub shoulders with the elite. Soon their firm was catering to movie stars, artists, intellectuals, and even royalty. A few of their notable clients included fashion icon Elsa Schiaparelli, Louise de Vilmorin, and Empress Nam Phuong.

=== WWI ===
While their business was gaining momentum, Jeanne's husband René and their son Pierre went to war to defend France in WWI. Both died at war in 1917, and—rather than closing the business after their deaths—Jeanne made the unlikely choice to keep operations running and carry on as head of the firm, while keeping René's name on the company and was known as Mme René Boivin.

== Career ==
=== House of Boivin ===
After the death of her husband and son, Jeanne became the first woman in Paris to run a major jewelry house. She was widely known as Madam René Boivin, as was custom at the time. Having had run the operations side of the firm she had established good relationships with the workshops and fabricators they partnered with. Further, she moved the workshop to Avenue de l'Opera, located in the center of Paris, and brought her daughter, Germaine, to work with her. Jeanne never opened a public-facing shop, as she was not interested in attracting the passing trade. Rather, she relied on word of mouth and the company's good reputation to draw in wealthy clientele.

=== Style ===
Jeanne generally ignored popular trends in fashion and chose to design jewelry pieces that went against the grain. For example, while others were producing black and white styles, she worked with colored stones. Jeanne had an eye for design, yet she did not have the technical skills needed to produce jewelry and did not possess the ability to draw. For this, she hired skilled designers who could bring her ideas to life while also contributing their own styles and ideas. She would talk with her designers and describe her ideas while they sketched and painted visual representations onto paper.

In 1919, Jeanne hired an up-and-coming designer, Suzanne Belperron, upon her graduation from the École des Beaux-Arts. Together they produced innovative, colorful pieces. Jeanne sought to move past the styles popularized by the Art Deco movement and favored jewelry that was more figurative and fluid. Jeanne was known to bring seashells and pebbles into the workshop to inspire her designers and soon the workshop was producing designs with a naturalist influence. These popular designs took the shape of nautilus shells, starfish, birds and other naturalist motifs.

In 1924, Jeanne appointed Belperron as co-director, a position she would hold until her departure in 1932. With Belperron's designs and Jeanne's direction, the House of Boivin quickly achieved a reputation for being one of the most innovative firms. Jeanne became interested in exotic styles and often combined both precious and semi-precious stones, unusual for jewelers of the time. Among the unusual materials used in the designs were woods such as ebony and sandalwood and semi-precious stones including rock crystal and aquamarine. The jewelry to come out of the House of Boivin is valued more for its design and craftsmanship than purely for the gemstone's worth.

After Belperron's departure, Jeanne brought on a new female designer in 1933, Juliette Moutard, who is credited with designing the famous Boivin Starfish Brooch in 1937. Only a few of the brooches were created and they attracted wealthy female clients. Actress Claudette Colbert and socialite Millicent Rogers each famously owned one. While the final design of the starfish brooch has been attributed to Moutard, it is generally hard to identify Boivin pieces and attribute them to specific designers as Jeanne maintained that the firm's jewelry was so distinctive that it needed no signature.

Jeanne's daughter, Germaine Boivin, was officially brought on as a designer in 1938. Her style complemented the other designers' and together, the three women produced designs that were bold, innovative, and timeless.

=== The House Closes ===
Jeanne died in 1959 and the company changed hands a few times over the following decades. There is conflicting information regarding who took over control upon her death. Eventually, in 1991, the House of Boivin was sold to the Asprey Group and subsequently closed its doors forever.

== Legacy ==
According to Françoise Cailles in her book René Boivin, Jeweller, Jeanne believed that jewels possessed their own identity and that "above all, she wanted her creations to live, to breathe, and to complement the movements of their owners." The designs to come out of the House of Boivin under her direction did just that and garnered a lasting legacy for the firm. Pieces can be found on the websites of Fred Leighton and jewelry dealer Siegelson. In 2008, Christie's sold a Starfish Brooch originally belonging to actress Claudette Colbert at auction for 210,500 Euros. The same brooch, after changing a few different hands, was sold by Siegelson to the Museum of Fine Arts Boston in 2019 for an undisclosed amount.

== Works cited ==
- Burns, Cherie (2018). Diving for starfish: the jeweler, the actress, the heiress, and one of the world's most alluring pieces of jewelry. St. Martin's Press. ISBN 978-1-250-05620-7. OCLC 983595519.
- Cailles, Françoise (1994). René Boivin, jeweller. London: Quartet. ISBN 978-0-7043-7090-6. OCLC 36165319.
