= Ward Landrigan =

American jeweler (1941–2025)

Ward Landrigan (August 7, 1941 – November 9, 2025) was an American jeweler. He was the chairman of Verdura and Belperron. Landrigan died on November 9, 2025, at the age of 84.
