= George W. Headley =

American jewellery designer (1908 - 1985)

- Born: George William Headley III; January 8, 1908; Lynchburg, Virginia
- Died: February 7, 1985 (aged 77); Lexington, Kentucky
- Education: Art Students League of New York, Ecole des Beaux-Arts
- Known for: Jewellery
- Notable work: Jewelry and bibelots

George William Headley III (January 8, 1908 – February 7, 1985) was an American jewelry designer, collector, socialite and founder of the Headley-Whitney Museum in Lexington, Kentucky. As a designer, he was known for collaborations with Salvador Dalí, Paul Flato, David Webb and Cartier, between the 1920s and 1960s, with clients including Douglas Fairbanks, Gary Cooper, the Marx Brothers, Judy Garland and Joan Crawford, as well as for his extravagant bibelots - small, intricate and precious decorative objects.

== Biography ==
George William Headley III was born in Lynchburg, Virginia on January 8, 1908, to Louise and George Headley Jr., a wealthy family which moved to Mississippi soon after his birth. He attended New Jersey preparatory school Lawrenceville School from 1924 to 1926. Artistically inclined from an early age, he studied art for one year in 1927 at the Art Students League of New York and then moved to France to attend the Parisian L'Ecole des Beaux-Arts and Académie Moderne, where he studied painting and planned to become an artist. In 1960, he married Barbara Whitney Henry Peck (died 1982), sister to Cornelius Vanderbilt Whitney (died 1992), and daughter of sculptor Gertrude Vanderbilt Whitney (died 1942), founder of the Whitney Museum of American Art. After a nineteen-year career in New York and Los Angeles, he moved to his Lexington, Kentucky family farm La Belle in 1949, where he died in 1985, two years after his wife. With a second home in Palm Beach, Florida, the couple were well known as traveling and entertaining socialites. The La Belle grounds became the Headley-Whitney Museum.

== Career ==
Headley got his start in 1930, as an apprentice to popular jeweler Paul Flato, who is considered the first celebrity jeweler, where he worked alongside Count Fulco di Verdura. In 1937 Flato opened his Beverly Hills salon across from the Trocadero nightclub, and both Headley and Verdura moved to Los Angeles.

In 1940s, he opened his own jewelry boutique in the Hotel Bel-Air in Los Angeles. After nearly a decade in California, he returned to La Belle in 1950 to be with his aging parents. At La Belle, he continued his career designing jewelry and bibelots, and collecting. Bibelots is a French term denoting a knick-knack or curio. Popular in the 19th century, they are small, beautiful, decorative objects often made with precious materials and intricate craftsmanship. In 1966, Headley was noted as the "greatest living creator of this extravagant craft", as well as for similar small boxes.

Headley described two of his pieces to the Palm Beach Daily News:

- "The idea of making a Swiss carving of a walnut came to me in the middle of the night. I drew two gold diamond canaries building a nest, and three diamond butterflies. By cutting the walnut in half and hollowing it out, I had space for a nest. When it opens one can see several tiny turquoise eggs."
- "Another piece I designed was made from a fragment of shell found at St. James Beach in Barbados. It is mounted with gold seaweed, and supports a coral mermaid from eighteenth century Naples."

== Headley-Whitney Museum ==
The La Belle farm was originally designed by Warfield Gratz in 1926. To house his growing collections, Headley hired Lexington architect Robert Pinkerton to design a luxurious and distinctive Jewel Room and Library. The rooms were heavily influenced by Headley's travels, drawing upon many different architectural styles and motifs. The buildings feature a sloped Thai roof, Greek columns, English windows, French floor design, and Georgian moldings to match Headley's eclectic style and tastes. The library holds a 1,500 volume collection of fine art books. The Jewel Room was built to display his collection of jewelry and bibelots, and is designed to evoke the feeling of a jewelry box with its dark enclosed interior. Both rooms are littered with Headley's collection of natural curios, specimens, objects, and art collected during his travels abroad. A former three car garage was transformed into a shell grotto, with coral floors, mosaic ceilings and walls covered in shells and polished stones.

The museum continues to be a popular attraction in the Lexington area. In the early days of the museum, Headley himself offered guided tours of his Jewel Room and Library.
