= Verdura (jeweler) =

American jeweler founded in 1939

Verdura LLC
- Type: Private
- Industry: Jewelers
- Founded: 1939
- Founder: Duke Fulco di Verdura
- Headquarters: New York, New York, U.S.
- Key people: Ward Landrigan (Chairman and CEO), Nico Landrigan, (President)
- Products: Jewelry

Verdura is an American fine jeweler and specialty retailer, headquartered in New York. Founded in 1939 by Duke Fulco di Verdura, its present-day collection is based on designs created by Fulco during his lifetime, as well as vintage estate pieces.

== History ==
After getting his start working for jewelers Gabrielle "Coco" Chanel and Paul Flato, Duke Fulco di Verdura opened a small, eponymous salon in 1939 at 712 Fifth Avenue in New York with the financial backing of Cole Porter and Vincent Astor.

In 1941, Fulco collaborated with Salvador Dalí on a collection of jewelry designs. Also that year, he designed "Night and Day" cufflinks for Cole Porter that were inspired by the lyrics of Porter's hit song and are considered signature Verdura pieces.

In 1973, Fulco sold his stake in the business to his business partner, Joseph Alfano.

In 1985, Alfano sold the company to Ward Landrigan.

== Present day ==
Landrigan, a former head of Sotheby's American jewelry department, began his own estate-jewelry business in 1973. Having been a longtime admirer of Fulco's designs, he decided to preserve the Verdura aesthetic, making jewelry the same way Fulco had, using many of the same jewelers Fulco used.

In 2003, Landrigan's son, Nico Landrigan, joined Verdura, becoming President of the company on September 1, 2009, Verdura's 70th anniversary.

== Designs ==
Verdura is best known for using large gemstones, yellow gold, and natural objects such as seashells in its work. Verdura was the first jeweler to promote the use of colored stones with gold for everyday wear. It was also the first to transform classical motifs like coins, ropes, and caning into popular jewelry.

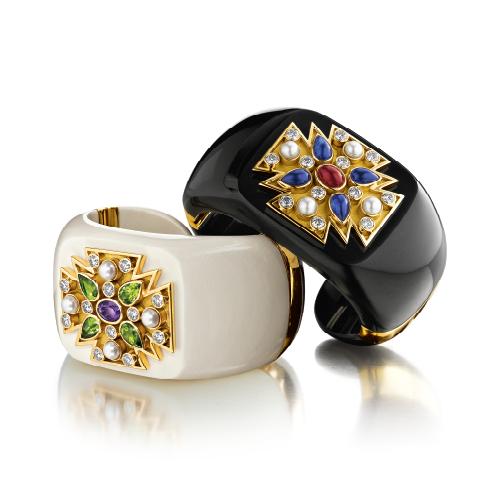
Verdura Maltese Cross Cuffs

Cole and Linda Porter were long-time clients; Linda commissioned a specially made Verdura cigarette case to commemorate the opening of each of her husband's shows, including Around the World in Eighty Days and Kiss Me, Kate.

In the 1930s, Coco Chanel asked Fulco to remount jewelry given to her by ex-lovers. The resulting design, the Maltese Cross Cuff, became a signature look for Chanel and the house of Verdura. In 2009, Verdura recreated 70 Maltese Cross Cuffs based on Fulco's original design for Chanel.

In the fall of 2011, Verdura recreated designs made for screen stars like Marlene Dietrich, Greta Garbo, and Joan Crawford.

== Influence ==
Verdura's designs have inspired the work of jewelers including Angela Cummings, Kenneth Jay Lane, Paloma Picasso, Seaman Schepps, Jean Schlumberger, and David Webb.
