= Suzanne Belperron =

French jeweler (1900–1983)

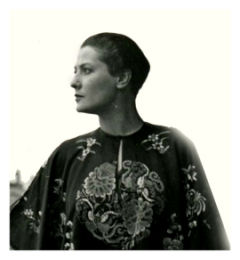
- Suzanne Belperron on her balcony wearing a kimono in embroidered silk (Archives Olivier Baroin)
- Born: Madeleine Suzanne Marie Claire Vuillerme; 26 September 1900; Saint-Claude, France
- Died: 28 March 1983 (aged 82); Paris, France
- Education: School of Fine Arts of Besançon
- Occupation: Jeweler
- Spouse: Jean Belperron

Suzanne Belperron (26 September 1900–28 March 1983), born in Saint-Claude, France, was an influential 20th-century jewellery designer based in Paris. She worked for the Boivin and Herz jewellery houses before the outbreak of World War II. Subsequently, she took over the Herz company, renaming it Herz-Belperron. She had many important clients, including royalty and people in the arts and show business on both sides of the Atlantic.

== Biography ==
=== Early life ===
Madeleine Suzanne Marie Claire Vuillerme, daughter of merchant Jules Alix Vuillerme (1861–1913) and Marie Clarisse Faustine Bailly-Maître (1866–1931), was born 26 September 1900 in the town of Saint-Claude, in Jura Mountains (eastern France), 60 kilometres from Geneva (Switzerland).

To fill the long winter months, the inhabitants of the Jura region had developed over the centuries a wide array of traditional crafts, including the art of cutting stones. The town of Saint-Claude was also, between 1885 and 1929, one of the most important world centers of diamond cutting.

Aware of Belperron's talent as a designer, her mother encouraged her by enrolling her in the School of Fine Arts in the town of Besançon. This public school was created in 1773 by the Swiss painter Melchior Wirsch and the French sculptor Luc Breton.

Belperron won first prize in the "Decorative Art" annual competition of 1918, with a pendant-watch. That prize was the reward for her years of study in "Watch-making and Jewelry Decoration".

=== Boivin jewellery house ===
In March 1919, soon after her move to Paris at the beginning of the "Golden Twenties", Belperron was taken on as a modelist-designer by Jeanne Boivin, the widow of René Boivin. The French jewellery house Boivin, created in 1890, had lost its founder in 1917, who was a talented designer.

From 1920 the collections of the Maison René Boivin featured many jewels inspired by Belperron's sketches from 1917, when she was still a student at the School of Fine Arts. At the time, these large curvaceous jewels went against the dominant Art Deco style, with its refined, geometric and structured jewels.

Jeanne Boivin, who always considered Belperron "a bit like her own child", recognised that she played "a major role in the artistic life of the Maison René Boivin". Without children, Belperron dedicated herself to advancing the creative cachet and international reputation of the jewellery house. In 1924, she became, at 23 years old, co-director of the Boivin jewellery house.

Suzanne married Jean Belperron, an engineer, who had been born on 18 February 1898 in Dole, also in the Jura region. The civil ceremony took place in the town hall at Besançon on 11 July 1924. The couple moved to 49 Rue Lamarck in the Montmartre area of Paris. In the studio of the Expressionist painter Gen Paul in Montmartre, Belperron met the writer Louis-Ferdinand Céline, the actors Robert Le Vigan and Arletty, and the playwright René Fauchois.

At Boivin, Belperron made a name for herself with designs that set precious stones in semi-precious materials like chalcedony, rock crystal, and smoky quartz.

=== 1930s, emerging fame ===
Belperron might have begun to feel bored and frustrated that the original designs for Boivin's creations were not attributed to her. This was not exceptional – jewellers over many decades had insisted on the anonymity of their designer-creators, no matter how talented they were.

In February 1932, Belperron resigned her position with Maison René Boivin. She was replaced by Juliette Moutard in January 1933 (who previously worked for the manufacturer of luxury watches Verger Frères) and Germaine Boivin, the daughter of Jeanne and René Boivin (who was previously a designer for her uncle the fashion designer Paul Poiret).

In April 1932, Belperron accepted the offer of Bernard Herz to take up a central position in his company. Bernard Herz, a renowned Parisian dealer in pearls and precious stones, was one of René Boivin's favourite suppliers. Herz gave her the freedom to design her own models under the name of Herz. Based in her private salon at 59 rue de Châteaudun in Paris, Belperron secured the services of the stonecutter Adrien Louart (1890–1989) and appointed Groëné et Darde as her exclusive manufacturer.

During the 1930s, the originality of Belperron's works brought increasing international acclaim to the Maison Bernard Herz. Belperron's fame grew, and she became a major figure in the artistic world both in France and abroad. Almost every month, her creations appeared alongside those of jewellers such as Cartier, Boucheron or Van Cleef & Arpels in luxury fashion magazines such as Vogue and Harper's Bazaar, with the regular collaboration of well-known photographers, notably George Hoyningen-Huene and Horst P. Horst. A close friend, Diana Vreeland (1903–1989), a major figure in the history of twentieth-century fashion adored Belperron's style. New York jeweller Paul Flato approached her in July 1939 to propose an artistic collaboration, declined by Belperron.

=== "My style is my signature" ===
As an unrivalled colourist, the essence of Belperron's work was her ability to play with aesthetic influences from many sources and motifs inspired by nature. Belperron was fascinated by the arts and the distant cultures of Egypt, East India, (the Assyrian civilisation in particular), the Far East (China, Japan), Africa and Oceania. She found inspiration in nature's flora and fauna, from creatures like starfish and insects to minutiae of a garden's flower petals and leaves. Belperron was also captivated by the underwater world, fascinated by the splendour of its shapes and the combinations of its colours.

Trained at the height of the Art Deco movement, Belperron softened its linear aesthetic, using materials and designs other jewellers had not yet explored. She pioneered the technique of setting precious stones in semiprecious materials. In addition to adapting these motifs in a unique way, she also opted for 22 karat gold, a softer karat level than commonly used, purely for its color. One of the techniques Belperron used is the "Honeycomb Setting", in which she combined gemstones of different sizes to achieve a harmony of colors and an impacting visual effect. The stones were supported by a hexagonal web of fine gold wires.

Her jewellery was so original that she never signed her pieces, instead insisting "my style is my signature". And only the jewels delivered by the hand of Belperron in her salon in the rue de Châteaudun, jewels that passed before her own eyes, can lay claim to the famous quote. She was convinced that the originality of her jewellery made it easily identifiable and that there was therefore no need for it to be signed. It was a principle from which she never wavered, yet it does not make the task of art historians or jewellery experts easy, as it can sometimes be very difficult to attribute a piece of jewellery to a designer solely on the basis of a characteristic style. It is estimated that Belperron only made between 3,000 and 5,000 jewels in her lifetime.

=== World War II: end of the Herz jewellery house ===
Bernard Herz was of Jewish origin. During the Occupation of Paris he was interrogated more than once. On one occasion, Belperron managed to save him from the Gestapo thanks to her friend Rika Radifé (wife of the actor Harry Baur).

Because of the discriminatory "Law on the status of Jews" legislation, copied from Nazi laws and passed in October 1940 by the Vichy Regime, Belperron took full control of the Maison Bernard Herz (from November 1940) to ensure the company's survival. As requested by Bernard Herz following his first arrest in 1941, Belperron recorded a new limited company, called "Suzanne Belperron SARL", on the Companies Register, with a capital of 700,000 francs. She had one associate, Henri Guiberteau. His friend Marcel Coard helped her and lent her the funds needed for the transaction.

Knowing that the future of the business rested solely on her shoulders, Belperron never stopped working during the war, despite the difficulties she experienced in obtaining the materials for making the jewels.

On 2 November 1942, Belperron was arrested at her office, due to a letter of denunciation indicating that "the Belperron house dissimulates a Jewish business". During her transfer to the Gestapo headquarters in Avenue Foch in Paris, Belperron swallowed all the pages of her address book, one by one. Bernard Herz was arrested the same day at his home and also underwent interrogation by the Gestapo. He was then driven straight to Drancy internment camp, where he stayed until 2 September 1943, when he was deported by the convoy n°59 to a concentration camp, Auschwitz, in Poland. Belperron was harassed by the Gestapo and was ordered to supply them with official documents about the origin and religion of her family.

During the hostilities, Belperron also joined the Resistance.

She was approached by several American companies with offers to design jewellery in America, but she chose to remain in Paris.

=== After war, creation of Herz-Belperron ===
In a last letter, dated 21 February 1943, sent from the Drancy internment camp, Bernard Herz entrusted his affairs to Belperron, along with his will, and asked her to protect the interests of Aline and Jean, his children.

On 6 December 1946, Jean Herz, son of Bernard, returned to Paris after a period of captivity as war prisoner. In fulfilment of his father's last wishes, Jean took on half-ownership of a new company called "Jean Herz-Suzanne Belperron SARL".

At the start of 1945, Belperron moved from her Montmartre flat to 14 rue d'Aumale in Paris, a short distance from the reception rooms of the Herz-Belperron jewellery house. Her vast flat was on a raised level of a neo-classical building, with a Far Eastern ambience harmoniously blended with a classical aesthetic style. The internal design of all the rooms was entrusted to Belperron's close friend Marcel Coard, whom she also commissioned for the decoration of the reception rooms at the rue de Châteaudun.

The younger Herz and Belperron resumed the partnership, working successfully together for the next 30 years.

=== Haute joaillerie for a prestigious clientele ===
Belperron received her clientele exclusively by appointment in salons situated on the third floor of 59, rue de Châteaudun in Paris. She never felt the urge to set up a boutique, so convinced was she that her pieces of jewellery themselves were her best ambassadors. Her address was only ever given out discreetly, by word of mouth, to chosen clients who had been attracted by the originality of her works, thus ensuring her increasing renown both in France and all over the world.

As a matter of utmost importance before carrying out any order, Belperron always found out about her client's lifestyle, and also studied the contours of her face, the complexion of her skin and the shape of her hands. Similarly, she took care to take the finger, wrist or neck measurements precisely, as an haute couture dressmaker. If necessary she would also have several 'fittings' before delivering the 'made-to-measure' ring to her client, to insure that each creation would suit the customer perfectly.

Like a workshop foreman, she kept a strict eye on the completion of each stage of manufacture, anxious that it should be perfect and that nothing should be left to chance. To this end, she set up a daily meeting at the salons in the rue de Châteaudun with the head of the workshop.

Belperron's clientele included most of Europe's royalty and aristocrats as the dynasties of the Aga Khan, Rothschild, Wildenstein and Duke of Windsor. She also attracted clients from the worlds of arts and show business, (actors, comedians, playwrights, dancers and singers), such as Colette, Robert Mallet-Stevens, Ganna Walska, María Félix, Arno Breker, Josephine Baker, Raoul Dufy, Daisy Fellowes, Alice Cocéa, Merle Oberon, Françoise Rosay, Mary Bell, Charles Boyer, Harry Baur, Louise de Vilmorin, Jean Cocteau and Gary Cooper. From the world of fashion, the names include notably her friends Elsa Schiaparelli, Diana Vreeland, Nina Ricci, Christian Dior and Jeanne Lanvin. The world of politics included names such as Paul Reynaud, Léon Blum, Maurice Couve de Murville, Gaston Palewski and Houphouët-Boigny.

=== End of life ===
On 12 July 1963, Belperron was elevated to the rank of Knight of the Légion d'Honneur. The Cross was presented to her by her great friend Jean Marchat, member of the Resistance during World War II, Légion d'Honneur and Secretary of the Comédie-Française.

Four years after the death of her husband in June 1970, Belperron and her associate Jean Herz agreed, at the general meeting held on 28 June 1974, to amicably dissolve their company. The Herz-Belperron company was liquidated on 31 December 1975. But this decision did not signify the end of her professional work. Whether in France or abroad, loyal clients had forged great bonds of friendship and trust with her over many years. They continued to call on her services, so she valued their jewels for the purposes of inheritance, insurance or gifts to museums. However, Belperron refused all proposals for collaboration (including Tiffany & Co) to re-edit her jewellery collection.

Belperron died in an accident in her bath (scalding herself) on 28 Mar 1983 at the age of 82. Childless, she bequeathed her property to a close friend.

== From the oblivion to rebirth ==
=== The auction of the Duchess of Windsor's collection of jewels in 1987 ===
Despite the popularity of her designs in her own time, Belperron's name was largely forgotten until the prestigious jewellery auction in Geneva on 2 and 3 April 1987 by Sotheby's of the Duchess of Windsor's collection of jewels and precious objects. During this auction, only five out of 16 Belperron pieces were correctly catalogued.

=== Re-edition of Belperron's jewels ===
Brought to the fore by the sale of the jewels belonging to the Duchess of Windsor, Belperron's work was finally recognised and highly valued. The "Société Nouvelle Herz-Belperron", at 10, Rue Vivienne in Paris, was founded in June 1991 and had only one exclusive American client, a jeweller based in New York, who ordered re-editions (hence modern jewels) from the Société Nouvelle Herz-Belperron.

The Société Nouvelle Herz-Belperron was liquidated on 28 December 1998, following a 'transfer of shares of the shareholders'.

=== Discovery of personal archives in 2007 ===
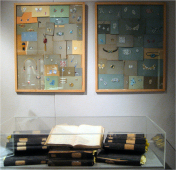
Overview of some personal archives (drawings, order books) discovered in 2007 – Sotheby's Paris – 24 January 2012

In 2007 the residuary legatee of Belperron died. By line of succession, the new residuary legatee became the owner of the estate, including her archives.

It was rumoured that Belperron had burned her archives, but this was just a myth. The new residuary legatee discovered, at the foot of Montmartre, a small apartment whose doors remained closed since 1983. This apartment contained Belperron's furniture, library, and her complete archives: a vast collection of drawings, sketches, models, casts, sketches, business correspondence, daily diaries and appointment orders from 1937 to 1974, photos, and press articles countersigned. This discovery is crucial to ensure the authenticity, traceability, and provenance of her works, which cannot be done from only simple drawings.

Belperron's heir honoured the will of the artist, the confidentiality of her archives, and the respect of her clients until his death.

These archives reveal that many things which have been written about Belperron, a private and very discreet woman, are without foundation. Furthermore, Belperron's archives confirm that there was a plan for an art book devoted to her work. Hans Nadelhoffer (1940–1988), an expert from Christie's jewellery department in Geneva, known for its reference monograph devoted to Cartier, planned, in 1981, a book about Belperron's work. Seduced by this project, she began to gather all her archives before she died.

In 2008, fascinated by art, the new heir asked a writer specialising in antique jewellery, Sylvie Raulet, and a French expert in jewellery, Olivier Baroin, to continue the draft monograph reference project started by Hans Nadelhoffer. The French expert acquired (on 1 October 2008 at Versailles) a registered contract for Belperron's complete archives, and was mandated by the last residual legatee to ensure in perpetuity "the future of the expertise of the complete work created by Suzanne Belperron", including authentication and certification. He manages, with the support from the heirs, the catalogue raisonné of the jewellery designer.

=== Recent sales ===
Belperron jewellery has kept its value well, as evidenced by two record sales in Paris with a cornucopia brooch of emeralds and diamonds sold for $674,999 in 2010 and a tourmaline, emerald, peridot, beryl, coloured sapphire and gold bracelet sold for $330,895 in 2011.

Early in 2012, Karl Lagerfeld, a collector of her work since 1960, chose one of her jewels in chalcedony to give the tone of the Chanel spring-summer collection. In May, he photographed and unveiled his own collection of Suzanne Belperron's jewelry. Having fallen in love with this artist "when no one else was paying attention to her", saying: "A Belperron jewel is instantly recognizable. It's a spirit".

"Suzanne Belperron is the most talented and influential jewelry designer of the 20th century": these were the words with which David Bennett, now Global Chairman of the International Jewellery Division of Sotheby's, opened the landmark sale on 14 May 2012, in Geneva. This sale showcased the jewelry from Suzanne Belperron's private collection, originating from her personal jewel box discovered during her estate settlement in 2007. The 60 lots sold for a total price three times higher than originally estimated.

In September, the chalcedony and sapphire set, crafted by Suzanne Belperron for the Duchess of Windsor in 1935, was showcased by the Siegelson house at the Biennale des Antiquaires in Paris.

The New York Times, in an article titled "Modern, Before the World Was," dedicated to Suzanne Belperron in its 20 December 2012 edition, notes that the designer had a major influence on modern jewelry, just as Coco Chanel did on haute couture. It also points out that her genius lay, in part, in her pioneering use of natural stones or pearls that were seldom used during that time.

In May 2013, the sale of jewelry designed by Suzanne Belperron for her friend Cécyle Simon was held in Geneva.

The gallery "La Golconde," named after the famous Indian mine that produced the stones beloved by Suzanne Belperron, opened in September 2014 at Place de la Madeleine in Paris. This venue, dedicated to the designer, houses her archives and jewelry assembled by the jeweler and gemologist Olivier Baroin.

In December 2014, Hôtel Drouot showcased a necklace and bracelet set characteristic of the Belperron style in terms of its volume and its delicate velvety blue shades. Estimated at between 10,000 and 20,000 euros, the auction price of this set broke a record, soaring to 415,000 euros.

In May 2015, Vanity Fair, in a lengthy article dedicated to Suzanne Belperron, noted that "their exclusivity, fragility, and rarity make Suzanne Belperron's jewelry hard to find today, and their auction prices reach levels that would delight the designer".

In June 2016, the Aguttes auction house in Paris showcased a significant platinum ring consisting of a wide curved band paved with rubies and accentuated with small diamonds. Estimated between 20,000 and €25,000, its price eventually reached €116,000 . In December 2017, a pair of white gold drop earrings sold for €255,000 .

At Christie's "Magnificent Jewels" sale in New York in December 2018, a "tube" bracelet in platinum and 18-carat white gold adorned with old-cut diamonds soared to $852,500, while its initial estimate was between $200,000 and $300,000. This piece of jewelry was created in 1935, as evidenced by a document countersigned by the hand of the designer, sourced from the personal archives preserved by Olivier Baroin.

In June 2023, a rare complete set, including a necklace, a pair of earring clips, and a corsage clip adorned with a myriad of sapphires and emeralds, once owned by the Hertz family, was put up for sale at the Hôtel Drouot in Paris. The collection sold for 468,000 euros.
