= Fulco di Verdura =

Don Fulco Santostefano della Cerda
- Duke of Verdura; Marquis of Murata la Cerda
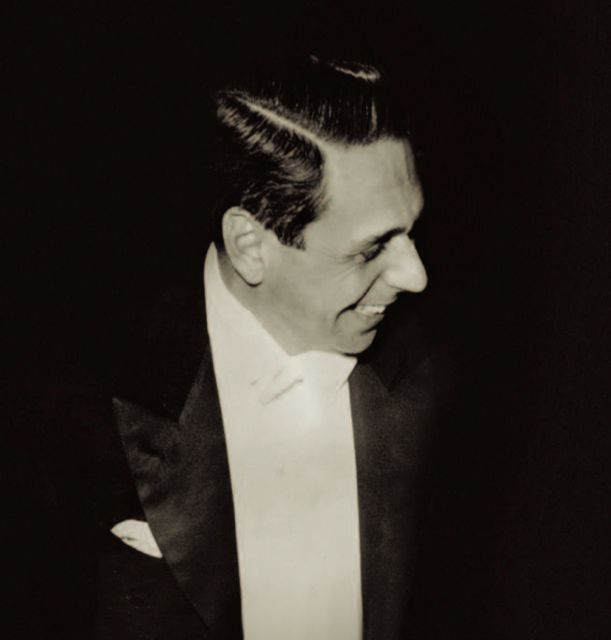
- Fulco di Verdura, circa 1939.
- Born: Fulco Santostefano della Cerda; March 20, 1898; Villa Niscemi, Palermo, Italy
- Died: August 15, 1978 (aged 80); London, England
- Occupation: Jeweler, artist

Fulco Santostefano della Cerda, 5th Duke of Verdura (20 March 1898 – 15 August 1978), known as Fulco di Verdura, was an influential Italian jeweller. His career began with an introduction to designer Gabrielle "Coco" Chanel by composer Cole Porter. He opened his own jewelry salon, which he called Verdura, in 1939.

He was the last to bear the now-defunct Sicilian title of Duke of Verdura, and his cousin was a prominent Sicilian prince, Giuseppe Tomasi di Lampedusa, author of the famous novel The Leopard. A biography of Fulco di Verdura was published by Thames & Hudson, authored by Patricia Corbett.

== Beginnings ==
Born in 1898 in Palermo, Italy to Giulio Santostefano della Cerda and Carolina Valguarnera dei principi di Niscemi, Fulco di Verdura grew up in aristocratic surroundings largely unchanged since the 1700s. During his early years, he developed a vivid imagination, wild sense of humor, and a love for animals that would later influence his jewelry designs.

Fulco gained the title of duke when, in August 1923, his father died. Free to go where he pleased but limited financially, he would have to find a profession that fit his stature and provided income to match his lifestyle.

== The Chanel years ==
A meeting in 1919 put Fulco on the path to discover what would be his life's work. That year, he met Linda and Cole Porter – two of his biggest supporters and early backers – in Palermo. Six years later, during a party hosted by the Porters in Venice, Linda introduced Fulco to Gabrielle “Coco” Chanel, who would go on to hire Fulco as a textile designer in 1927. Quickly identifying his talents, Chanel asked him to update the settings of jewelry she had been given by ex-lovers, including Bendor Grosvenor, Duke of Westminster, and the Russian Grand Duke Dmitri. Impressed with his work, Chanel began what would be an eight-year collaboration by making him head designer of Chanel jewelry.

Not long after Fulco started working for Chanel, he created her now iconic Maltese Cross Cuffs, setting a gold cross adorned with bright cabochons in white enamel. A year later, Chanel boutiques sold a piece of costume jewelry modeled after the cuffs Fulco created. The cuffs are considered the hallmark of the Verdura brand and they have been copied many times over the years.

== The Flato years ==
Fulco left Chanel in 1934 to venture to the United States with Baron Nicolas de Gunzburg and Princess Natalia Pavlovna Paley. He traveled first to Hollywood and then to New York where Diana Vreeland, a Chanel client, introduced Fulco to the jeweler Paul Flato. Fulco joined Flato's design team full-time when Flato opened a boutique in Hollywood. “Verdura for Flato” became a signature admired by both socialites on the East Coast and silver screen royalty out west.

== Verdura LLC ==
Fulco broke out on his own in 1939, opening a small salon called Verdura in New York at 712 Fifth Avenue with the financial backing of Cole Porter and Vincent Astor. His primary inspiration came from his childhood in Sicily. His love of art began when he learned about the Renaissance in an illustrated book on Raphael. In the designs he made for Verdura, he continuously incorporated themes of nature, creating brooches that looked like leaves made of colored zircons, a pomegranate made of ruby seeds, a gold corncob made with black pearl kernels, and an artichoke made of emerald petals.

In 1941, Fulco collaborated with Salvador Dalí on a collection of jewelry designs. This historic partnership resulted in the following creations: Medusa brooch, Apollo and Daphne brooch, St. Sebastian objet d'art, spider cigarette case, fallen angel pillbox. The collection debuted at the Julien Levy Gallery in Manhattan in 1941 and was later exhibited at the Museum of Modern Art in New York as part of a Dalí/Joan Miro exhibition. Also that year, he designed “Night and Day” cufflinks for Cole Porter that were inspired by the lyrics of the hit song and have since become signature Verdura pieces. Porter, in return, immortalized Fulco's name in the song “Farming” from the 1941 show Let’s Face It!: “Liz Whitney has, on her bin of manure, a Clip designed by the Duke of Verdura.”

During the 1960s, Cartier sought Fulco's creative input for a potential collaboration. However, Fulco declined the offer, choosing to remain independent.

A perfectionist, Fulco would spend his days drafting precise design sketches, specifying materials, size, and color. Joseph Alfano, Fulco's business partner, is responsible for preserving a good portion of Fulco's sketches that now comprise the Verdura archive and otherwise would have been destroyed, rescuing overlooked pages in sketchbooks, scraps left on the floor, and sheets discarded in wastepaper baskets.

Fulco di Verdura's illustrious clientele included royalty, socialites, and Hollywood stars. His notable commissions included the "Indian Headdress Tiara" for Betsy Cushing Whitney, crafted in yellow gold and diamonds, as well as the emerald ‘scarf’ necklace made for Dorothy Paley Hirshon. For Wallis, Duchess of Windsor, Verdura designed a thistle-shaped brooch, gem-studded shell ear clips, and jeweled compacts.

== Personal life ==
According to the British interior decorator Nicholas Haslam, Fulco was a lover of Simon Fleet or Harry Carnes, his real name. Simon had worked as an actor and designer. Fulco later met Tom Parr, an interior decorator who was a friend and business partner of David Nightingale Hicks and later head of Colefax and Fowler. They stayed together until Fulco's death.

== Retirement and death ==
In 1973, Fulco sold his stake in his business to Alfano and retired to London where he continued to sketch and paint until his death in 1978. He never married and had no children and so with him, the Santostefano della Cerda family died out. He had arranged for his ashes to be brought to Palermo after his death and kept in the family tomb at the Cimitero di Sant'Orsola in Palermo.
