= Paul Flato =

American jewelry designer (1900- 1999)

- Paul Flato's signature
- Born: September 1, 1900; Flatonia, Texas
- Died: July 17, 1999 (aged 98); Ft. Worth, Texas
- Education: University of Texas at Austin
- Known for: Jeweler
- Notable work: Art deco, important and whimsical fine jewelry

Paul Edmund Flato (September 1, 1900 – July 17, 1999), was an American jeweler, based in New York City from the 1920s to the early 1940s. Considered the first celebrity jeweler, he was well known for important jewelry, and as an early proponent of whimsical pieces. His long list of movie star clients included Greta Garbo, Mae West, Rita Hayworth, Joan Crawford, Doris Duke, Ginger Rogers, Carmen Miranda, Marlene Dietrich, Katharine Hepburn, and Gloria Vanderbilt—many of whom wore his pieces on screen.

== Biography ==
Paul Edmond Flato was born in 1900 in Shiner, Texas, son of prominent Texas cattleman Rudolph, and Julia Burow Flato, a German immigrant. He died on July 17, 1999, having returned to Texas late in life, and received full column obituary in The New York Times. He was said to have become interested in jewelry at the age of ten, watching nomadic Gypsies make silver-wire items for sale. He grew up in a town founded by his westward pioneering great-grandparents, earlier German immigrants who purchased Mexican land. After attending the University of Texas at Austin, he moved to New York City in the early 1920s to start medical school. But due to his father's financial issues at the time, he instead became a watch salesman.

== Rising career ==
Soon after moving to New York, he opened his own upstairs jewelry shop at One East 57th Street, at the corner of 5th Avenue in Manhattan. Several years later, Tiffany & Co. opened its flagship store directly across the street.

Before long, Paul Flato was "one of the best known jewelers in New York", the only one whose "highly imaginative work (was) on a par with European jewelers."

He employed several designers, including future luminaries David Webb, George W. Headley and Count Fulco di Verdura. He was reportedly Harry Winston's largest client when Winston was strictly a wholesale dealer.

In 1937, he opened a second store on Sunset Boulevard in Beverly Hills, CA, across from the popular Trocadero nightclub, furthering his relationships with celebrity clientele. In addition to 5 non-appearing film credits, Flato had an on-screen role as a jeweler in the 1940 film Hired Wife starring Rosalind Russell and Virginia Bruce.

== Designs ==
Paul Flato was well known for "witty and flamboyant designs" and Art Deco jewelry, which since his death regularly fetches hundreds of thousands of dollars at auction, including at Sotheby's and Christie's.

Some of his most famous pieces include platinum and diamond jeweled ribbons, scrolls and flowers. "An apple blossom necklace for Lily Pons, the opera singer, wrapped around the neck and opened in the front with diamond blossoms cascading on either side. A rose became a rambler that twined around the wrist on a baguette-cut diamond stem sprouting rose-cut diamond buds" wrote The New York Times in his obituary. He made a diamond and ruby studded corset bracelet, based on Mae West's undergarment, and a "gold digger" bracelet with a gold pick-ax. Other subjects included angels, including one on a chamber pot, and gold feet with ruby toe nails, for a well known dancer.

He started a trend with black enamel and jeweled encrusted initials, and his solid gold screw and nut cufflinks were featured on the cover of "Masterpieces of American Jewelry", a book released with an exhibition of the same name, organized by the American Folk Art Museum in 2004, which featured seven Flato pieces.

== Downfall ==
Flato was convicted in 1943 of fraudulently pawning $100,000 in jewels that colleagues and clients had entrusted to him, and served 16 months in Sing Sing Penitentiary. Flato was convicted despite maintaining his innocence. It was later discovered that his tailor had stolen the jewels from the pocket of a garment. Upon release in 1945, he moved to Mexico City until 1953, all the while fighting extradition to the US to face additional larceny and forgery charges involving a fortune teller who claimed he owed money to.

In 1970, he moved to Mexico City for a second time, opening a jewelry store in the fashionable Zona Rosa area, which he operated in relative anonymity until 1990, when he returned to Texas. Paul Flato spent his final years surrounded by his family. He was survived by his three daughters, Catharine Dennis, Barbara McCluer, and Susan Flato.

== Publications ==
- Paul Flato: Jeweler to the Stars by Elizabeth Irvine Bray, 1st Ed, published Nov 16, 2010, Hardcover 224 pages, Published by Antique Collectors Club Dist. ISBN 1851496246
- Masterpieces of American Jewelry by Judith Price, 1st Ed, published Sep 7, 2004, Hardcover 128 pages, published by Running Press, ISBN 0762421185
