= List of Revlon spokesmodels =

The list of Revlon spokesmodels collects all spokesmodels representing the American cosmetics company Revlon.

== 1932–1939 ==
- Georgia Carroll
- Elizabeth Gibbons

== 1940–1949 ==
- Dorian Leigh
- Dina Merrill
- Adele Simpson

== 1950–1959 ==
- Nancy Berg
- Iris Bianchi
- Barbara Britton
- Carmen Dell'Orefice
- Gita Hall
- Dolores Hawkins
- Dorian Leigh
- Johanna McCormick
- Suzy Parker
- Jean Patchett
- Mary Jane Russell

== 1960–1969 ==
- Ina Balke (German)
- Candice Bergen
- Monique Chevalier
- Julie Christie
- Wilhelmina Cooper
- Deborah Dixon
- Barbara Feldon
- Agneta Frieberg
- Lucinda Hollingsworth
- Lauren Hutton
- Sue Murray
- Kecia Nyman
- Jennifer O'Neill
- Suzy Parker
- Jean Shrimpton
- Tilly Tizzani
- Veruschka von Lehndorff

== 1970–1979 ==
- Christie Brinkley
- Kecia Nyman
- Shaun Casey
- Nancy DeWeir
- Susan Forristal
- Shelley Hack
- Veronica Hamel
- Lauren Hutton
- Lena Kansbod
- Evelyn Kuhn
- Catherine Roberts
- Rene Russo
- Cybill Shepherd
- Susan Shoenburg
- Naomi Sims
- Charly Stember

== 1980–1989 ==
- Paula Abbott
- Donna Alexander
- Kim Alexis
- Kim Basinger
- Monica Bellucci
- Michaela Bercu
- Josie Borain
- Kersti Bowser
- Michele Brooks
- Joan Collins
- Cindy Crawford
- Tara D'Ambrosio
- Janice Dickinson
- Tamara Dobson
- Nancy Donohue
- Linda Evangelista
- Cathy Fedoruk
- Sandra Freeman
- Rebecca Ghiglieri
- Dayle Haddon
- Jerry Hall
- Estelle Hallyday
- Patti Hansen
- Lauren Helm
- Audrey Hepburn
- Clare Hoak
- Rachel Hunter
- Iman
- Kathy Ireland
- Elaine Irwin Mellencamp
- Beverly Johnson
- Milla Jovovich
- Lisa Kauffmann
- Nancy Kerrigan
- Bitten Knudsen
- Tara Krahn
- Cynthia Lamontagne
- Kelly Le Brock
- Cara Leigh
- Susan Lucci
- Karin Lund
- Robyn Mackintosh
- Maki
- Claudia Mason
- Susan Miner
- Liza Minnelli
- Amie Morgan
- Carrie Nygren
- Gail O'Neill
- Carré Otis
- Dolly Parton
- Tatjana Patitz
- Daniela Peštová
- Paulina Porizkova
- Wanakee Pugh
- Kathryn Redding
- Hunter Reno
- Cordula Reyer
- Ashley Richardson
- Annette "Jade" Roque
- Beth Rupert
- Rene Russo
- Carmen San Martin
- Claudia Schiffer
- Joan Severance
- Brooke Shields
- Renée Simonsen
- Alexa Singer
- Talisa Soto
- Linda Spierings
- Sharon Stone
- Fabienne Terwinghe
- Aya Thorgren
- Cheryl Tiegs
- Laurence Treil
- Christy Turlington
- Nastasia Urbano
- Frederique van der Wal
- Rosie Vela
- Louise Vyent
- Rachel Williams
- Oprah Winfrey
- Kara Young
- Sandra Zatezalo

== 1990–1999 ==
- Halle Berry
- Carla Bruni
- Jenny Brunt
- Naomi Campbell
- Valerie Chow
- Helena Christensen
- Cindy Crawford
- Waris Dirie
- Donna Dixon
- Karen Duffy
- Gail Elliott
- Emme
- Jennifer Flavin
- Daisy Fuentes
- Yasmeen Ghauri
- Florencia Gomez Cordoba
- Melanie Griffith
- Lene Hall
- Katja Halme
- Salma Hayek
- Mariel Hemingway
- Tia Holland
- Susan Holmes
- Lauren Hutton
- Grace Jones
- Melissa Keller
- Sally Kellerman
- Claudia Mason
- Karen Mulder
- Thania Peck
- Bernadette Peters
- The Pointer Sisters
- Jaime Rishar
- Joan Rivers
- Annette "Jade" Roque
- Claudia Schiffer
- Gurus Segovia
- Connie Sellecca
- Nicollette Sheridan
- Gigi Stoll
- Courtney Thorne-Smith
- Christy Turlington
- Shania Twain
- Eva Voorhees
- Estella Warren
- Veronica Webb
- Trisha Yearwood

== 2000–2009 ==
- Jessica Alba
- Clara Alonso
- Alessandra Ambrosio
- Bianca Balti
- Halle Berry
- Moon Bloodgood
- Veronica Blume
- Kate Bosworth
- Nicola Breytenbach
- Eishia Brightwell
- Ana Carmo
- Sandra Cisa
- Jennifer Connelly
- Luciana Curtis
- Chantal Diguer
- Marybeth DuPain
- Rhea Durham
- Almudena Fernández
- Miriam Fernandez
- Isabeli Fontana
- Daisy Fuentes
- Beau Garrett
- Bridget Hall
- Sierra Huisman
- Carmen Kass
- Liya Kebede
- Melissa Keller
- Jaime King
- Vendela Kirsebom
- Milena Kundicova
- Jennifer Lamiraqui
- Bianca Lawson
- Lucy Liu
- Zuzana Macasova
- Ruza Madarevic
- Heather Marks
- Eva Mendes
- Cherina Montenique
- Julianne Moore
- Sarah Murdoch
- Jade Parfitt
- Rosamund Pike
- Bianca Porcelli
- Minerva Portillo
- Marie Powell
- Caroline Ribeiro
- Pania Rose
- Laura Sanchez
- Susan Sarandon
- Eugenia Silva
- Sarah Thomas
- Daniela Urzi
- Yasmin Warsame
- Erin Wasson
- Rachel Weisz
- Anoek Wielakker
- Liisa Winkler
- Sarah Wynter
- Sonny Zhou
- Leticia Zuloaga

== 2010–2019 ==
- Jessica Alba
- Belén Bergagna (Latin America only)
- Halle Berry
- Jessica Biel
- Ciara
- Gal Gadot
- Barbara Garcia
- Ashley Graham
- Marina Jamieson
- Natalia Kozior
- Elle Macpherson
- Bonang Matheba
- Tiffany Pisani (UK only)
- Scandal (Japan only)
- Shanina Shaik
- Olga Sherer
- Gwen Stefani
- Emma Stone
- Elbe van der Merwe
- Anne Vyalitsyna
- Olivia Wilde
- Alejandra Espinoza

== 2020-Present ==
- Sofia Carson
- Jessica Jung
- Gal Gadot
- Sdanny Lee (李斯丹妮)

== Men featured in Revlon ads ==
A small number of men have also appeared in Revlon advertising, to promote men's colognes, perform jingles, or pose with spokesmodels, including:

- Bobby Short (performed commercial jingles)
- Mel Tormé (performed commercial jingles)
- Little Richard (performed commercial jingles)
- Nat King Cole (performed commercial jingles)
- Pat Riley (appeared alongside spokesmodels)
- Sugar Ray Leonard (appeared alongside spokesmodels)
- J. Robert Dixon (promoted men's cologne)
- Peter Sellers (promoted men's cologne)
- Tony Randall (promoted men's cologne)
- Paul Newman (promoted men's cologne)
- Don Johnson (appeared alongside then-wife Melanie Griffith)
- Dan Aykroyd (appeared alongside wife Donna Dixon)
- Frank Sinatra (appeared alongside wife Barbara Sinatra)
- Daniel Pimentel (appeared alongside Halle Berry)
- Pharrell Williams (appeared alongside Jessica Biel)
