= Make-up artist =

Artist who applies makeup and prosthetics

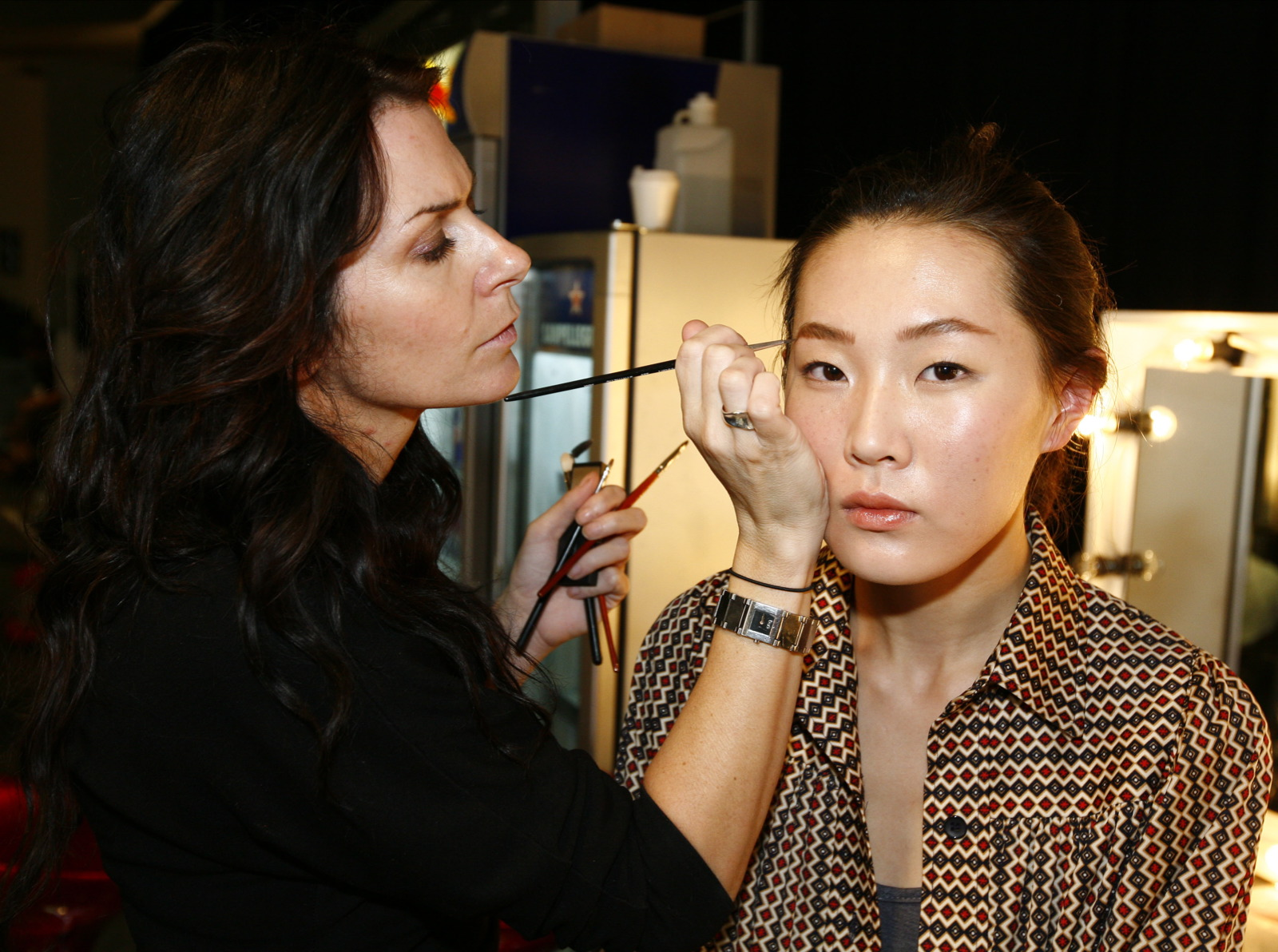
- Makeup artist backstage at the Lee Matthews show, Spring/Summer 2007 Australia Fashion Week

Occupation
- Names: Makeup artist, MUA
- Occupation type: Art, aesthetics
- Activity sectors: Entertainment, fashion

Description
- Fields of employment: Film, television, theatre, photography, modeling
- Related jobs: Cosmetologist, hairstylist

A make-up artist, also called a makeup artist, and often shortened to MUA, is an artist whose medium is the human body, applying makeup and prosthetics on others for theatre, television, film, fashion, magazines and other similar productions including all aspects of the modeling industry. Awards given for this profession in the entertainment industry include the Academy Award for Best Makeup and Hairstyling, and entertainment industry awards such as the Emmy Awards, and the Golden Globes. In some countries professional licenses are required by agencies in order for them to hire the MUA. Bigger production companies have in-house makeup artists on their payroll, although most MUAs are generally freelance and their schedules remain flexible depending on the project.

Over time, makeup enthusiasts have made up a large part of make-up artists. These self-taught artists use themselves as their own canvas or work freelance within their community, often in areas that may not have access to renowned make-up artists. Many have found their way into the industry through this enthusiasm.

== Makeup techniques ==
=== Fashion ===
Fashion makeup is used in magazine photography as well as on the fashion runway. Avant-garde makeup is also an applicable technique used for projects that require experimental themes. Fashion makeup is also commonly used in television and film ranging from the natural prime look to more sophisticated applications such as color balance.

=== Theatrical makeup ===
Stage makeup is used as a method in conjunction with stage lighting to highlight the actors' faces in order to make expressions visible to the audience from moderate distances. This often includes defining the eyes and lips as well as the highlights and lowlights of the facial bones.

=== Special make-up effects (FX makeup) ===
The use of special effects techniques enhancing physical features to exhibit metaphysical characteristics as well as fantasy makeup. The use of prosthetics and plaster casting are also required for projects that entail non-human appearances. Accents such as theatrical blood and ooze are also techniques applicable to this type of makeup.

=== Airbrushing ===
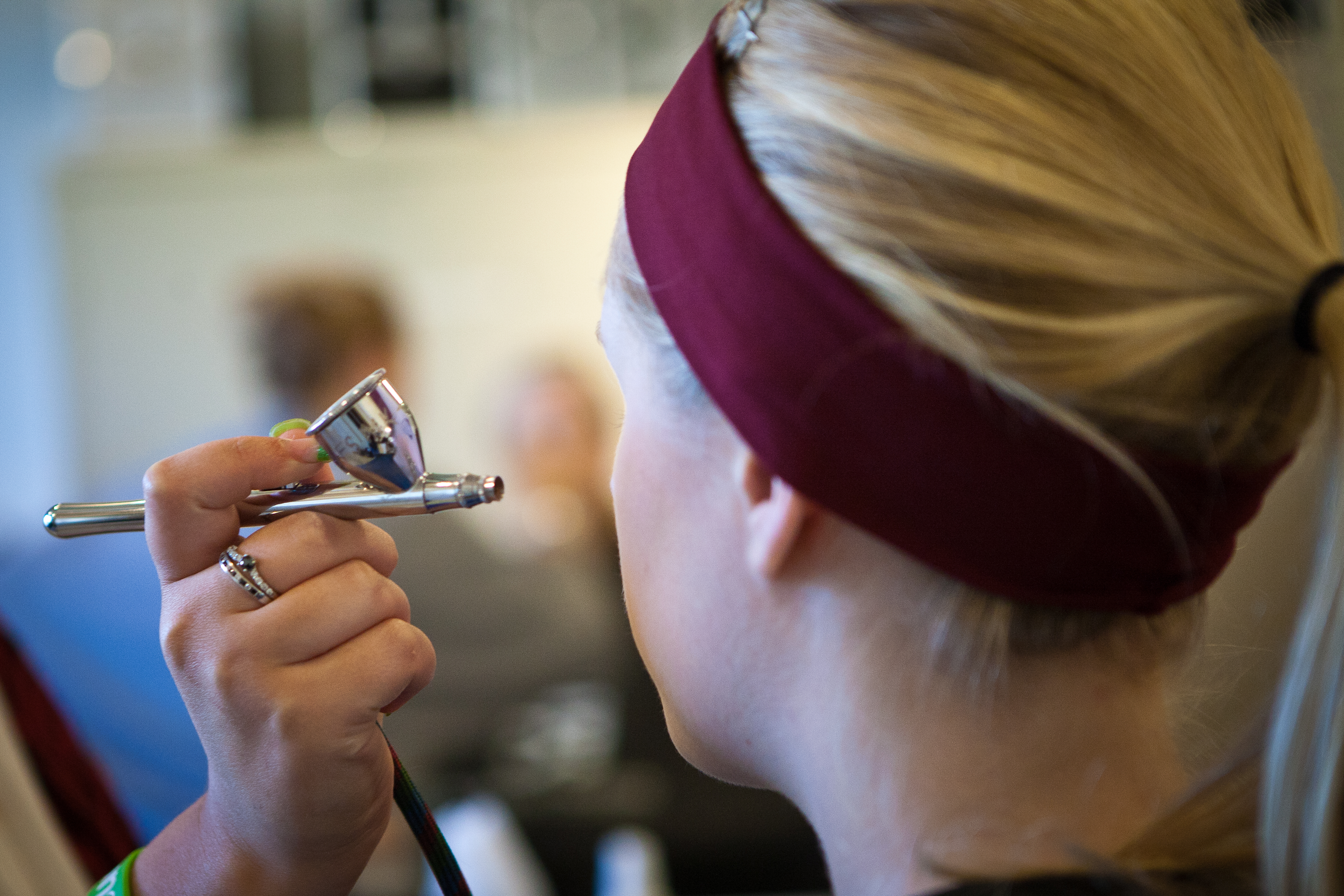
A makeup artist applies foundation to a model's face with an airbrush.

An airbrush is a small air-operated device that sprays water-based makeup by a process of nebulization. Airbrushed makeup was used in Hollywood movies at least as early as the 1930s. Monte Westmore is sometimes credited with developing the technique for Gone With the Wind, but his brother Wally was using it at least five years earlier in Pre-Code films such as Murder at the Vanities. It has recently been re-popularized by the advent of HDTV and digital photography, where the camera focuses on higher depths of detail. Liquid foundations that are high in coverage but thin in consistency are applied with the airbrush for full coverage without a heavy build-up of product.

=== High definition ===
High-definition makeup involves the use of light reflectors and ingredients such as minerals to give the skin a flawless finish. It was developed in response to the advancement of high-definition media and the cost of airbrush makeup.

== Occupational hazards and safety ==
=== Dermal hazard ===
Dermal exposure is another hazard caused by the rapid use of foundation, adhesives, and other products by makeup artists. Preservatives and fragrances can trigger serious irritation and allergic dermatitis in some people. A study by Panico examined ingredients list from 283 makeup products and identified some concerning substances like fragrances and preservatives.

=== Respiratory chemical hazards ===
Spray on cosmetics can pose a health risk to make-up artists. Products such as setting sprays, facial sunscreens, and spray-on foundations, where the product is released through a spray, or when powders might be blown into the air, are pathways where particulate matter may be inhaled, exposing the respiratory tract and causing health effects as explained below.

Since make-up artists work multiple sessions a day, often for long periods, their cumulative exposure is expected to exceed that of a typical wearer. This emphasizes the need for awareness of these potential hazards and necessary preventative measures.

How much reaches the lungs depends on product and spray characteristics, including nozzle type and geometry, aerosol charge, and spraying distance. Participle emissions also vary by shade and brand (reported at 12,000-22,000 particles/cm³), reflecting differences in formulation. In simulated powder application, 85-93% of inhaled particle deposition occurred in the head airways, with under 10% reaching the alveolar region. Simulated consumer sprays showed a similar pattern. Some products contain chemically modified or nano-enabled ingredients with atypical physiochemical properties, and their behavior in the breathing zone may differ from conventional ingredients. In lab studies, aerosols from metal-containing nano-enabled cosmetics increased oxidative stress and DNA damage in lung cells.

=== Ergonomics ===
Day to Day: For a makeup artist in the industry standing, waiting for models, and staying in the same position for extended periods of time are part of the day. Makeup application involves repeated hand and wrist movement and bending of the neck and back. This especially happens multiple times as they have multiple clients in one sitting.

== In Bollywood ==
In 1955, the Bollywood group Cine Costume Make-Up Artist & Hair Dressers' Association (CCMAA) created a rule that did not allow women to obtain memberships as makeup artists. However, in 2014 the Supreme Court of India ruled that this rule was in violation of the Indian constitutional guarantees granted under Article 14 (right to equality), 19(1)(g) (freedom to carry out any profession) and Article 21 (right to liberty). The judges of the Supreme Court of India stated that the ban on women makeup artist members had no "rationale nexus" to the cause sought to be achieved and was "unacceptable, impermissible and inconsistent" with the constitutional rights guaranteed to the citizens. The Court also found illegal the rule which mandated that for any artist, female or male, to work in the industry, they must have domicile status of five years in the state where they intend to work. In 2015 it was announced that Charu Khurana had become the first woman to be registered by the Cine Costume Make-Up Artist & Hair Dressers' Association.

In June 2014, the Cine Costume Make-Up Artist & Hair Dressers' Association (CCMAA) authorised an official protest on the movie set of Bang Bang! in protest of a foreign makeup artist, Daniel Bauer, working on the movie for its lead actress, Katrina Kaif. The CCMAA and 15 of its members protested on the movie set as Daniel Bauer was not registered with the Union, despite the Union banning foreign artists working in Bollywood. The issue was resolved with the CCMAA granting Daniel Bauer full membership.

== Notable make-up artists ==
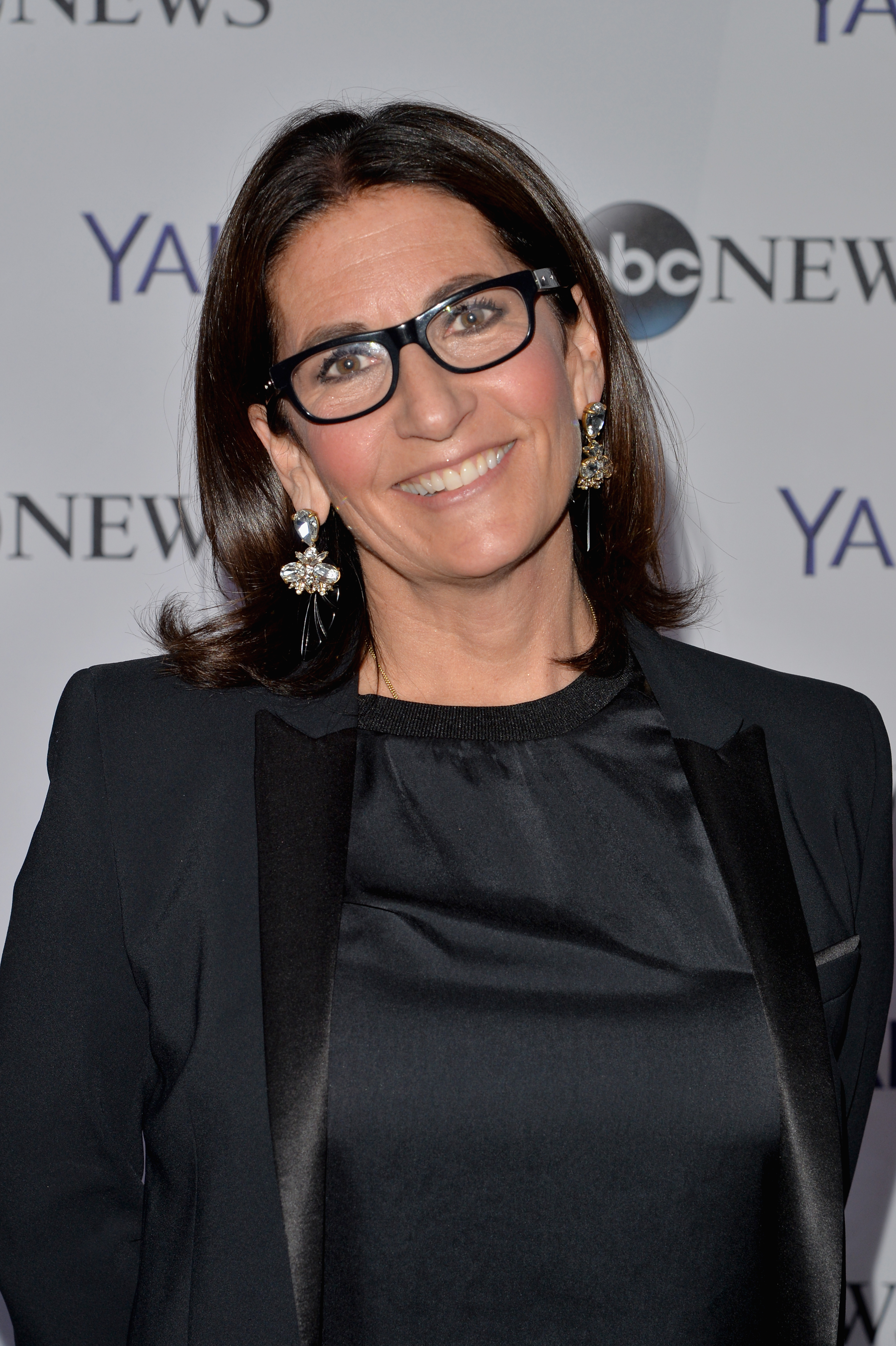
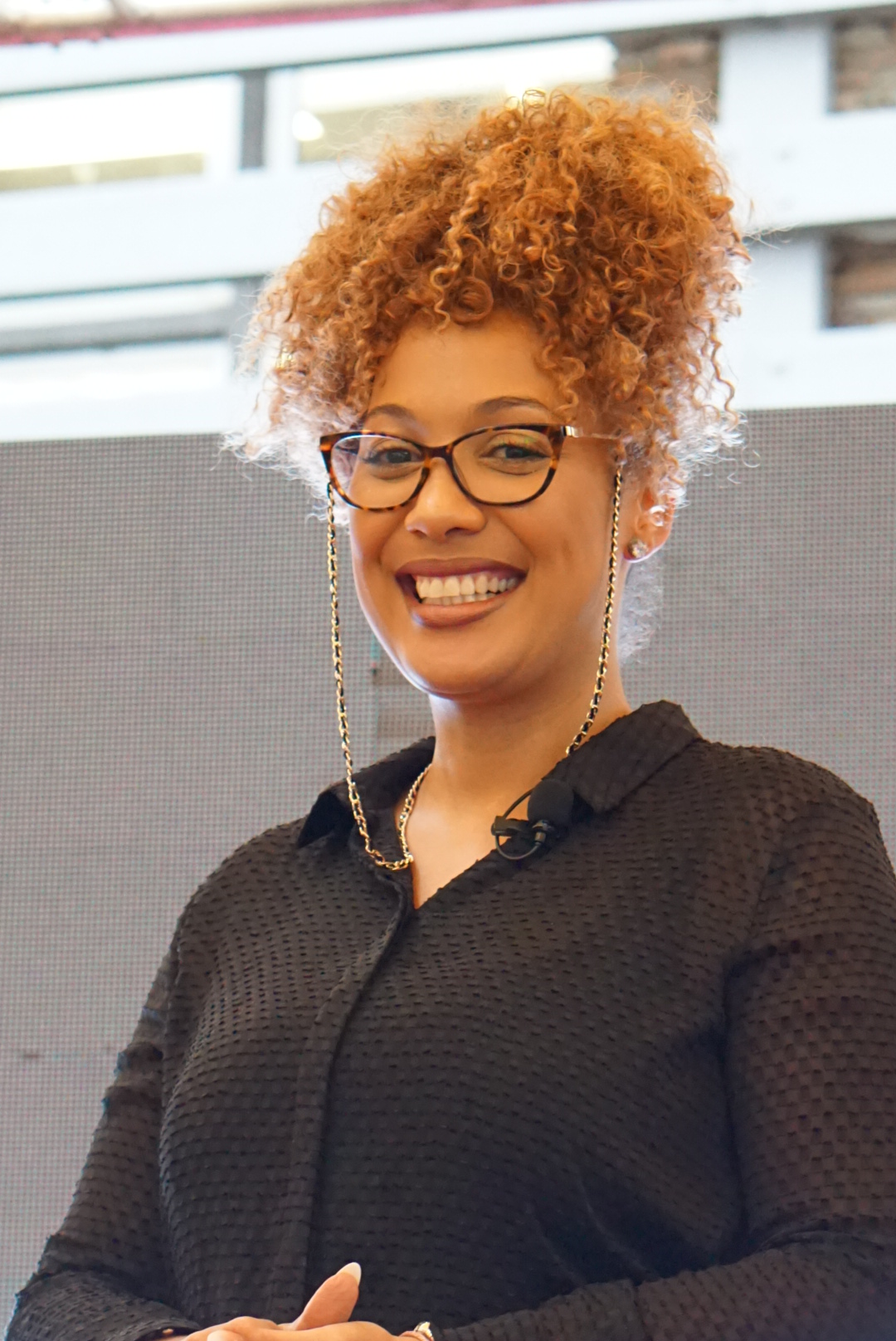
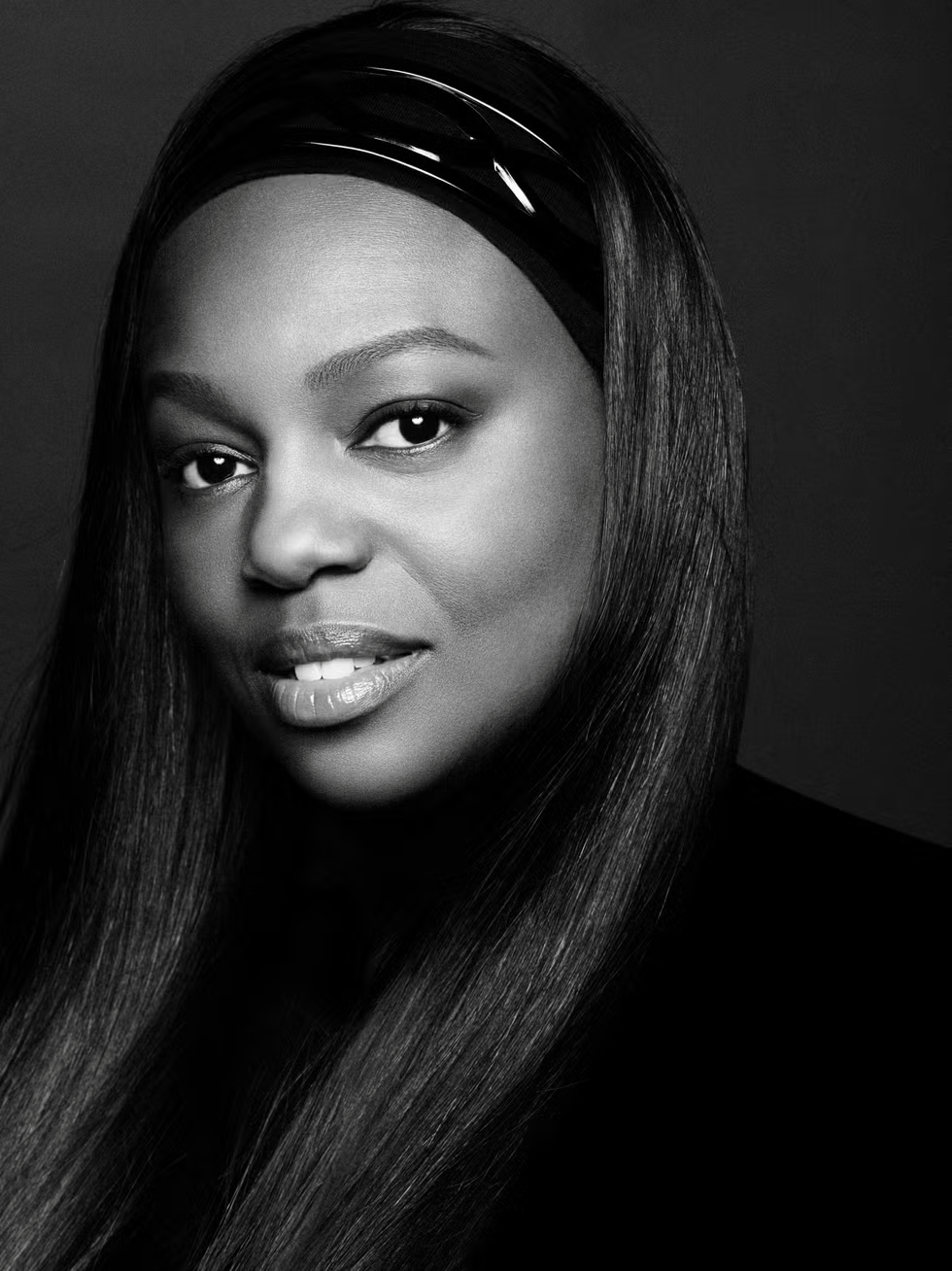
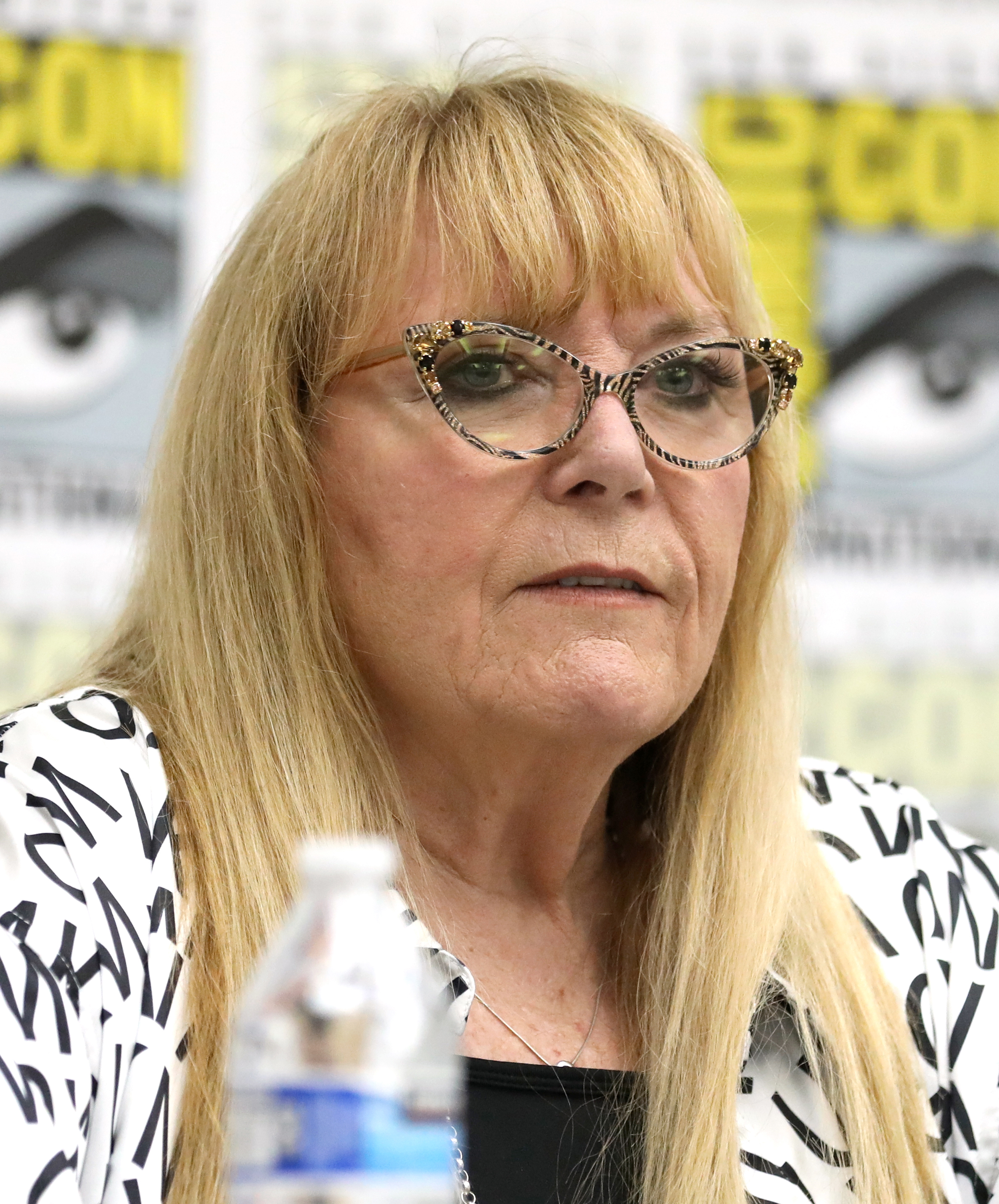
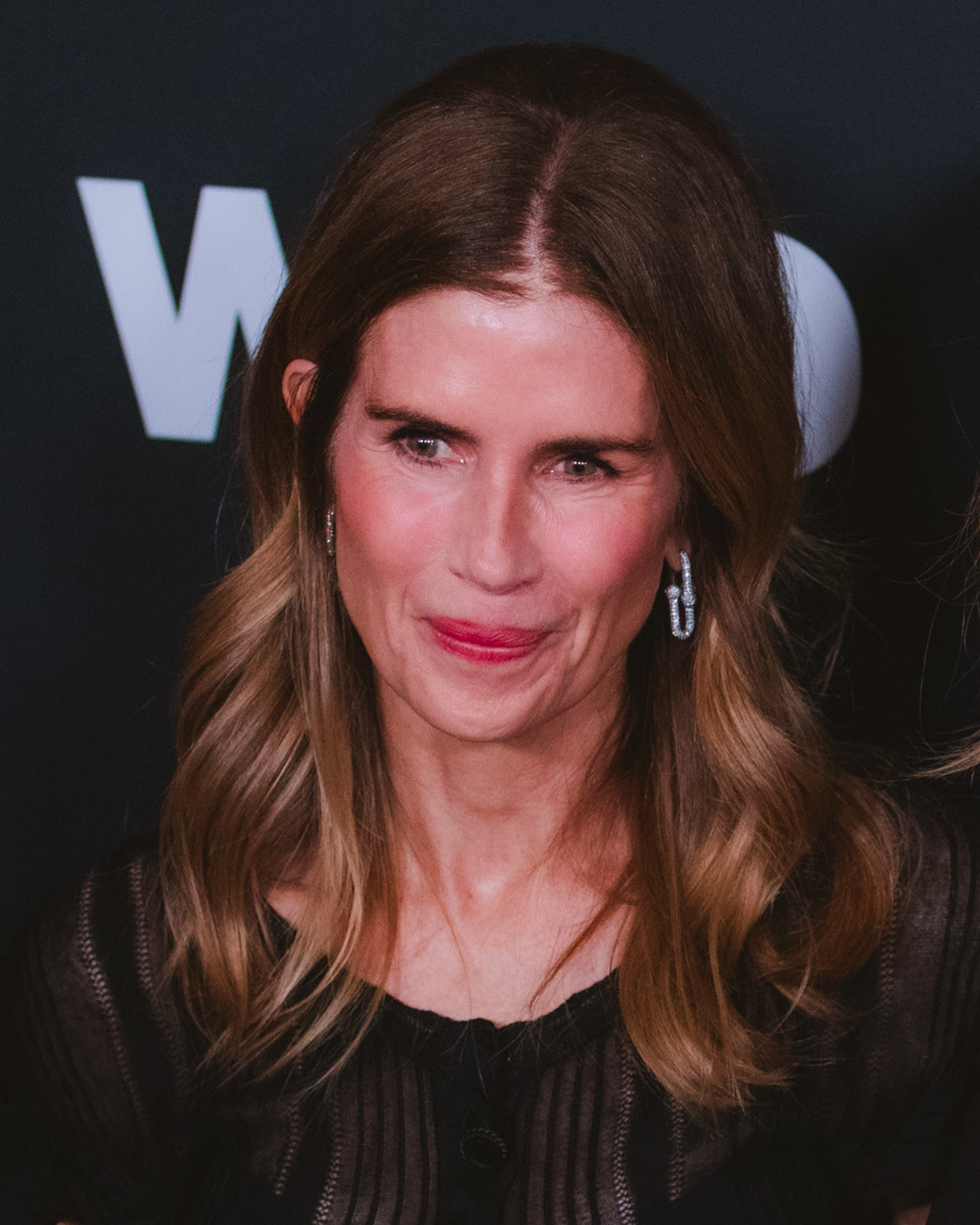
Makeup artists (top, L–R) Bobbi Brown, Anette Dawn, Sandra Don-Arthur, (bottom, L–R) Pat McGrath, Ve Neill, and Gucci Westman.
- Bernadine Anderson
- Rick Baker
- Sir John Barnett
- Bobbi Brown
- Linda Cantello
- Marco Castro
- Anette Dawn
- Sandra Don-Arthur
- Lisa Eldridge
- Joanne Gair
- Kelly Hanna
- Huda Kattan
- Michael Maron
- Pat McGrath
- Ve Neill
- Charlotte Tilbury
- Gucci Westman
