= Carmen Dell'Orefice =

American actress and model (born 1931)

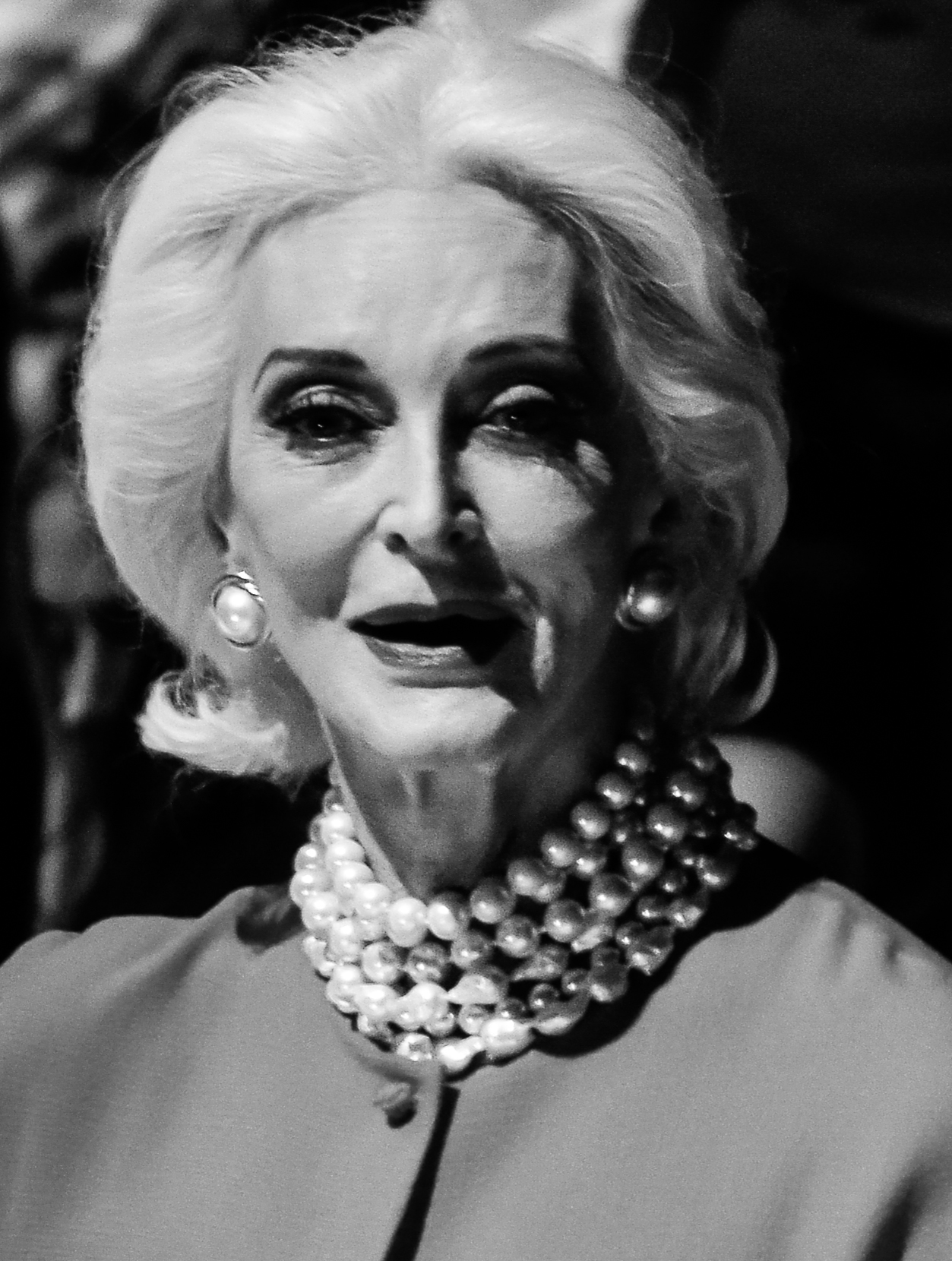
- Dell'Orefice at a Chado Ralph Rucci fashion show in September 2012
- Born: June 3, 1931 (age 95); New York City, U.S.
- Occupations: Model, actress
- Years active: 1946–present
- Spouses: Bill Miles (m. 1952; div. 1953) Richard Heimann (m. 1959; div. 1960) Richard Kaplan (m. 1963; div. 1974)
- Modeling information
- Height: 5 ft 11 in (1.80 m)
- Hair color: Silver
- Eye color: Blue

Carmen Dell'Orefice (/dɛlˈɔːrfɪtʃeɪ, ˌdɛlɔːrˈfiːtʃeɪ/, Italian: [delloˈreːfitʃe]; born June 3, 1931) is an American model and actress. As of the 2012 Spring/Summer season, she has been known within the fashion industry as the world's oldest working model. She was on the cover of Vogue at age 15 and has been modeling ever since; she has also been featured on TV and film.

== Early life ==
Carmen Dell'Orefice was born in New York City. Her father was a violinist with Italian roots, and her mother was a ballerina of Hungarian descent. As a child, she dreamed of pursuing ballet and following in her mother's footsteps. Her parents had an unstable relationship characterized by frequent break-ups and reconciliations. Dell'Orefice lived in foster homes or with other relatives during her parents' clashes.

== Career ==
At age 13, while riding a bus to ballet class, she was approached to model by the wife of photographer Herman Landschoff. Her test shots, taken at Jones Beach, were a "flop", according to Dell'Orefice. In 1946, when she was 15, her godfather introduced her to Vogue, and the young teen soon signed a modeling contract for $7.50 an hour. She became a favorite model of photographer Erwin Blumenfeld who shot her first Vogue cover in 1946. She appeared in the December 15, 1946 issue of US Vogue; New York Vol. 108, Iss. 11, as Little Red Riding Hood, Snow White, and Cinderella, along with model Dorian Leigh and actors Ray Bolger and Jose Ferrer.

Dell'Orefice's modeling income was not enough to sustain the family, and she and her mother struggled financially. Since they had no telephone, Vogue had to send runners to their apartment to let Dell'Orefice know about modeling jobs. She roller-skated to assignments to save on bus fares. She was so malnourished that fashion photographers Horst P. Horst and Cecil Beaton had to pin back dresses and stuff the curves with tissue.

She and her mother were seamstresses and earned extra money making clothes. One of their customers was model Dorian Leigh. Dell'Orefice later became best friends with Leigh's younger sister, model Suzy Parker. Together they were bridesmaids at Leigh's second wedding, to Roger W. Mehle in 1948.

Dell'Orefice appeared on Vogue's October 1947 and November 1948 covers. Mark Shaw also photographed her for a Vanity Fair lingerie campaign, in which she obscured her face with her hand. She was a muse of painter Salvador Dalí.

== Retirement and return to modeling ==
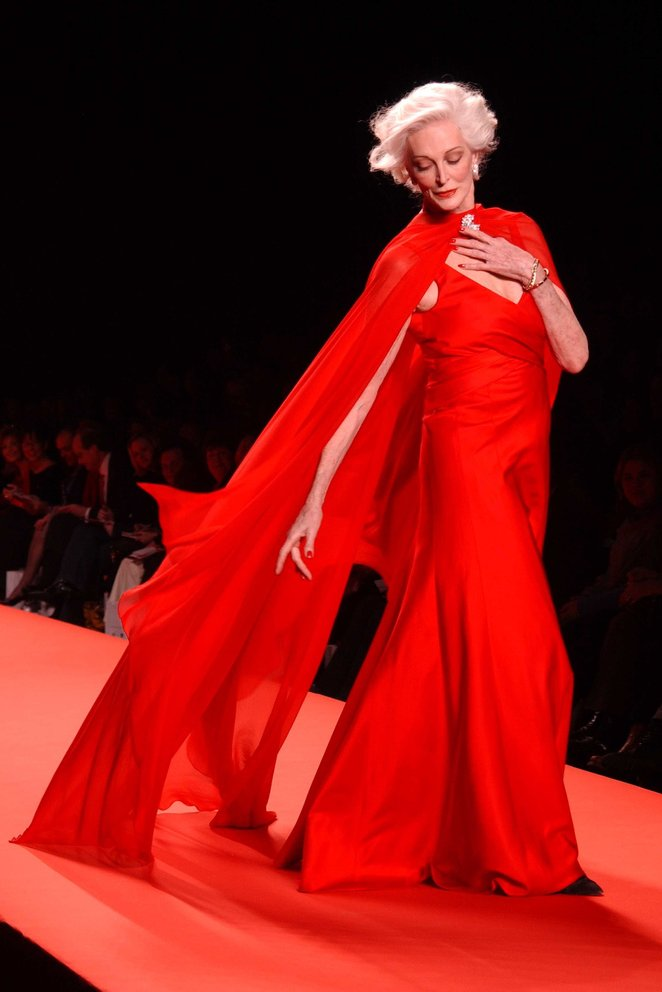
Dell'Orefice in the 2005 Red Dress Collection show for The Heart Truth

She joined the Ford Modelling Agency in 1953.

In need of funds, Dell'Orefice returned to modeling in 1978. In 1984, she appeared on the cover of Quarante, a newsstand quarterly publication subtitled, "For the woman of style and substance." In the 1990s and 2000s, she modeled for Isaac Mizrahi's clothing line at Target, as well as Cho Cheng and Rolex. Dell'Orefice is featured regularly in their advertising campaigns in Vogue, W and Harper's Bazaar.

In 1993, she appeared in The Babe Business, a feature-length documentary about models that was filmed in New York and directed by Don Boyd for Channel Four television.

On July 19, 2011, she was awarded an honorary doctorate from the University of the Arts London, in recognition of her contribution to the fashion industry. The university sponsored a retrospective exhibition, curated by illustrator and long-time friend David Downton, featuring Dell'Orefice's Vogue covers, career highlights, and photographs from her personal archives.

Since her return to the industry, Dell'Orefice has appeared in campaigns for Missoni, shot by Giampaolo Sgura; Sephora, shot by Mikael Jansson; Philipp Plein, shot by Steven Klein and H&M, and walked the runway for Anna Sui, Stéphane Rolland, Thierry Mugler and Guo Pei. In 2015, Dell'Orefice collaborated with David Gandy and Isabeli Fontana in the promotion for the reopening of the department store Palacio de Hierro Polanco. She has also featured on the covers of L'Officiel (Australia, Azerbaijan, Switzerland), Marie Claire Arabia, and Harper's Bazaar Thailand.

== Personal life ==
Dell'Orefice met and married Bill Miles in the early 1950s. He then exploited his wife financially by picking up her modeling checks and granting her only a $50 allowance from her earnings. They had a daughter, Laura, and divorced soon after her birth. In 1958, she met photographer Richard Heimann and married him six months later. She decided to retire, after which he left her.

She has stated that her daily motto has been to enjoy herself at no one else's expense.

=== Financial losses ===
In the 1980s and 1990s, Dell'Orefice lost most of her money in the stock market. She was forced to auction off her modeling photographs from the 1940s to the 1980s through Sotheby's.

In 1994, with what little money she had left, plus funds from boyfriend Norman Levy, she invested with Bernie Madoff—who was later revealed to be a major financial fraud. But before that, for 12 years, Ruth and Bernie Madoff and Dell'Orefice and Norman Levy were a "foursome," traveling and partying together on lavish yachts. When Levy died in 2005, at age 93, Madoff was the executor of his will. Levy had $244 million in assets at the time of his death, according to Dell'Orefice. Madoff's fraudulent investment scheme drew on these funds to lure more than 13,500 individuals and charities to his Ponzi scheme. She continued to socialize with the Madoffs after Levy's death.

Then, in December 2008, a 68-year-old friend, who had invested her own life savings with Madoff, telephoned to inform Dell'Orefice that she, too, had been bankrupted by the scheme. Dell'Orefice said, "For the second time in my life, I've lost all of my life savings."

== Filmography ==
Film
Year	Title	Role	Notes
1966	The Last of the Secret Agents?	Baby May Zoftig	Credited as Carmen
1996	The Sunchaser	Arabella	
1998	Celebrity	Pinky Virdon	Credited as Carmen Dell Orefice
2002	The Guru	Socialite	
2010	Bill Cunningham New York	Herself	

Television
Year	Title	Role	Notes
1998	Ageless Heroes	Herself	Documentary
2004	Law & Order: Special Victims Unit	Marion	Episode: "Bound"
2012	Fashion News Live	Herself	1 episode
2012	About Face: Supermodels Then and Now	Herself	Documentary
2012	Clarige's	Herself	Documentary
2012	Beauty CULTure	Herself	Documentary short
2016	Project Runway All Stars	Herself	

== Bibliography ==
- Carmen Dell'Orefice, Alfred Allan Lewis Staying Beautiful: Beauty Secrets and Attitudes from My Forty Years as a Model Publisher HarperCollins, 1st edition (January 1, 1985), 203 pages, ISBN 978-0060153861
