= Cholly =

Cholly is a given name or nickname that may refer to:

- Cholly Atkins (1913–2003), American dancer and choreographer
- Cholly Knickerbocker, pseudonym
- Cholly Naranjo (1934–2022), Cuban baseball pitcher
- Cholly, a Chalicotherium in Ice Age 2: The Meltdown
