= Number 12 Looks Just Like You =

- The Twilight Zone episode
- Marilyn after transformation
- Episode no.: Season 5 Episode 17
- Directed by: Abner Biberman
- Written by: John Tomerlin
- Based on: "The Beautiful People" by Charles Beaumont
- Cinematography by: Charles Wheeler
- Production code: 2618
- Original air date: January 24, 1964

Guest appearances
- Collin Wilcox: Marilyn Cuberle; Suzy Parker: Lana Cuberle / Eva / Doe / Grace / Jane / Patient / Number 12; Richard Long: Uncle Rick / Dr. Rex / Sigmund Friend / Dr. Tom / Tad / Jack / Attendant; Pam Austin: Valerie / Marilyn (after transformation) / Number 8

Episode chronology
← Previous "The Self-Improvement of Salvadore Ross"	Next → "Black Leather Jackets"
- The Twilight Zone (1959 TV series) (season 5)

"Number 12 Looks Just Like You" is the 17th episode of the fifth season of the American anthology television series The Twilight Zone, first airing on January 24, 1964. The story is set in a dystopian future in which everyone, upon reaching adulthood, has their body surgically altered into one of a set of physically attractive models. American fashion model Suzy Parker portrays seven different characters in the episode.

The script was written and adapted by John Tomerlin from "The Beautiful People" (1952), a short story by Charles Beaumont. The story is often viewed as a thematic companion piece to "Eye of the Beholder" (1960) from the second season. It is one of several episodes within the series that explores the idea of forced conformity in totalitarian systems, but also comments on the limitations of culture in free societies where choices are restricted and commodified.

== Opening narration ==
Given the chance, what young girl wouldn't happily exchange a plain face for a lovely one? What girl could refuse the opportunity to be beautiful? For want of a better estimate, let's call it the year 2000. At any rate, imagine a time in the future when science has developed the means of giving everyone the face and body he dreams of. It may not happen tomorrow—but it happens now, in The Twilight Zone.

== Plot ==
In a future society, all nineteen-year-olds go through a process known as the "Transformation", in which each person's body is changed to a physically attractive design chosen from a selection of numbered models. The process also slows deterioration due to age and confers immunity to disease, extending human lifespans, as well as making unspecified psychological corrections. Due to the overwhelming popularity of female model 12 and male model 17, all adults wear name badges to avoid confusion.

Eighteen-year-old Marilyn Cuberle decides not to undergo the Transformation. Nobody else can understand Marilyn's decision, and her family and best friend are all confused by her displeasure with the conformity and shallowness of contemporary life. Her "radical" beliefs were fostered by her now-deceased father, who gave Marilyn banned books and came to regret his own Transformation years earlier, committing suicide upon the loss of his identity. Her mother takes her to see Dr. Rex, who initially thinks Marilyn wants to have the procedure early, but is shocked to learn about Marilyn's refusal.

Dr. Rex sends her to Professor Sigmund Friend, who claims that the Transformation is justified as it has led to the end of war and hate in society, along with many health benefits, in addition to the change in appearance. When Marilyn protests that she still does not want the procedure, he has Marilyn confined to a hospital room against her will, ostensibly to psychologically examine her and cure her of her reason for refusing the procedure. Marilyn suspects that despite not being legally required, the Transformation is not optional, and is being maintained by the leaders of society to ensure conformity. Her best friend Valerie, who has already undergone the Transformation, shows no emotional reaction to Marilyn's protests, even when she is driven to tears. Marilyn realizes that no one who has undergone the Transformation remains capable of any empathy for or understanding of her. She tries to escape from the hospital, but ends up in the operating room to undergo the Transformation.

Dr. Rex, who operated on Marilyn, comments that some people have problems with the idea of the Transformation but that "improvements" to the procedure now guarantee a positive result. Marilyn reappears, looking and thinking exactly like Valerie. "And the nicest part of all, Val", she gushes, "I look just like you!"

== Closing narration ==
Portrait of a young lady in love—with herself. Improbable? Perhaps. But in an age of plastic surgery, body building and an infinity of cosmetics, let us hesitate to say impossible. These, and other strange blessings, may be waiting in the future—which, after all, is The Twilight Zone.

== Program notes ==
To show this future society in this episode, Suzy Parker and Pam Austin play almost all of the female roles (Collin Wilcox plays protagonist Marilyn prior to her transformation), while Richard Long plays all of the male roles; dialogue in the episode indicates that Parker and Long portray the most popular models selected for the transformation. According to show producer William Froug, Parker was specifically cast because she "was at the time the most famous model in the [United States] ... it was my notion that if you were going to do a show about everybody looking as beautiful as possible to use her."

This episode was originally sponsored by American Tobacco (Pall Mall), with an "alternate sponsors" message (from Procter & Gamble) in the middle.

== Cultural influence ==
Charlie Brooker stated in an interview that this episode influenced "Fifteen Million Merits", an episode of his anthology series, Black Mirror.
