= Circle of Deception =

1960 British film by Jack Lee

- US poster
- Directed by: Jack Lee
- Screenplay by: Nigel Balchin; Robert Musel
- Based on: Small Back Room in St. Marylebone; 1953 story in Esquire by Alec Waugh
- Produced by: Tom Morahan
- Starring: Bradford Dillman; Suzy Parker; Harry Andrews
- Cinematography: Gordon Dines
- Edited by: Gordon Pilkington
- Music by: Clifton Parker
- Distributed by: Twentieth Century Fox
- Release date: November 1960
- Running time: 100 minutes
- Country: United Kingdom
- Language: English

Circle of Deception is a 1960 CinemaScope British war film directed by Jack Lee and starring Bradford Dillman, Suzy Parker and Harry Andrews. The screenplay was by Nigel Balchin and Robert Musel.

== Plot ==
A Canadian officer is sent on a secret and dangerous mission during World War II. His superior officers deceptively give him false information about the planned invasion of 1944. He is told that this secret information must not get into enemy hands. He is transported into occupied territory in a way that ensures he will be captured. He resists torture but finally tells all. The Germans are misled and the Normandy landings succeed. The Canadian officer is now a broken man.

== Cast ==
- Bradford Dillman as Captain Paul Raine
- Suzy Parker as Lucy Bowen
- Harry Andrews as Captain Thomas Rawson
- Robert Stephens as Captain Stein
- Paul Rogers as Major William Spence
- John Welsh as Major Taylor
- Ronald Allen as Jim Abelson
- A. J. Brown as Frank Bowen
- Martin Boddey as Henry Crow
- Charles Lloyd-Pack as Ayres
- Michael Ripper as Chauvel
- Duncan Lamont as Ballard
- Jacques Cey as Cure
- John Dearth as Captain Ormrod
- Norman Coburn as Carter
- Richard Shaw as Liebert
- Hennie Scott as small boy
- Richard Marner as German colonel
- Walter Gotell as phoney Jules Ballard
- Tony Doonan as R.A.F. Sergeant

== Reception ==
The Monthly Film Bulletin wrote: "There is a striking story here, and the disappointment is that the film has left it unexplored. The way in which Raine is used, the motives, doubts, stifling of scruples among the people using him, are the real material, rather than the pre-determined fate of the victim himself. But the film tells its story in flashback, leaving itself no element of surprise; encourages Harry Andrews to play Rawson on a note of cool indifference (which drastically weakens his case); and allows Suzy Parker's crisis of conscience to become apparent only in a few bitten lips and misty smiles. We are left, consequently, with nothing much to wait for beyond the torture scene, and there is something morbid about a film in which routine dramatics are engineered to lead up to such an episode. This, it should be said, was probably not the intention: the torture is not staged for sensation, and the effect produced is mainly a matter of unimaginative plotting and approach. Jack Lee's direction is a bit flat, quickening into life in some of the action scenes."

In The Radio Times Guide to Films Robyn Karney gave the film 3/5 stars, writing: "Well-directed by Jack Lee, with convincing performances from Dillman and a host of first-class English stage and TV actors, this is a decent espionage drama."
