= The Death of Manolete =

- Playhouse 90 episode
- Suzy Parker and Jack Palance in "The Death of Manolete"
- Episode no.: Season 2 Episode 1
- Directed by: John Frankenheimer
- Written by: Barnaby Conrad, Paul Monash
- Original air date: September 12, 1957

Guest appearances
- Jack Palance as Manolete; Suzy Parker as Tani Morena

Episode chronology
← Previous "The Fabulous Irishman"	Next → "The Dark Side of the Earth"

"The Death of Manolete" was an American television play broadcast live on September 12, 1957, as part of the CBS television series, Playhouse 90. It was the first episode of the second season and featured Jack Palance in the role of Manolete. Producer Martin Manulis later called it "the classic clinker of all time."

== Plot ==
The play told the story of the Spanish bullfighter Manolete. Manolete was the idol of Spain and had made four million dollars when he was killed in the bullring at age 30.

== Cast ==
- Jack Palance as Manolete
- Suzy Parker as Tani Morena (Manolete's mistress)
- Robert Middleton as Perea
- Ray Danton as Antonito
- Nehemiah Persoff as Camara (Manolete's manager)
- Esther Minciotti as Augustias

== Production ==
Barnaby Conrad approached producer Martin Manulis and director John Frankenheimer proposing to turn his upcoming book The Death of Manolete into a production for Playhouse 90. Manulis and Frankenheimer were both enthusiastic about the idea and decided to open the second season with the project. Unfortunately, Manulis later recalled, it turned out to be "the classic clinker of all time." He cited several reasons for the failure:

- First, Manulis wondered how they thought they could shoot the climactic bullfight scene using a fake bull's head that was jerked up down by a couple of stagehands jerking lying just below the camera's view. Paul Monash, who adapted the book for television, also recalled the use of the fake bull's head as "one great mistake."
- Second, Jack Palance's outfit was drooping at the back and made him look like an old man.
- Third, they could not find an actress willing to play the part of Manolete's mistress. They finally settled on Suzy Parker who had "promised her mother she would never act and didn't break her promise."

Despite the poor quality of the production, it drew attention when "every comic in town" did a parody of the program.

Because of the difficulties with presenting a bullfight on live television, the production relied heavily on film clips of Manolete's performances.

== Reception ==
In The New York Times, Jack Gould wrote the production "never deeply involved the viewer or gave a truly illuminating insight into the man." He did praise John Frankenheimer who "technically integrated" the newsreel scenes with the live scenes.

Critic John Crosby called it "large, noisy and disappointing." He also wrote that Suzy Parker could hardly be described as a good actress and "should never open her mouth."

In the New York Daily News, Kay Gardell wrote that "it was more a mood piece than an exciting drama" and "fell short of hitting a bull's-eye." However, she praised Palance's "taut and terrifying" portrayal of Manolete.
