= Dorian Leigh =

American fashion model

- Born: Dorian Elizabeth Leigh Parker; April 23, 1917; San Antonio, Texas, U.S.
- Died: July 7, 2008 (aged 91); Falls Church, Virginia, U.S.
- Spouses: Marshall Hawkins (m. 1937; div. 1944); Roger W. Mehle (m. 1948; div. 1954); Alfonso de Portago (m. 1954; void 1954); Serge Bordat (m. 1958; div. 1960); Iddo Ben-Gurion (m. 1964; div. 1966)
- Children: 5
- Relatives: Suzy Parker (sister)

Dorian Elizabeth Leigh Parker (April 23, 1917 – July 7, 2008), known professionally as Dorian Leigh, was an American model and one of the earliest modeling icons of the fashion industry. She is considered one of the first supermodels, and was well known in the United States and Europe.

== Biography ==
=== Early life ===
Dorian Leigh Parker was born in San Antonio, Texas, to George and Elizabeth Parker. Her parents married when they were around 17 or 18 years old and Elizabeth promptly gave birth to three daughters in quick succession: Dorian, Florian "Cissie" (1918–2010), and Georgiabell (1921–1988). Thirteen years after the birth of her third daughter, Elizabeth believed she was going through menopause and was shocked to discover that she was pregnant. She gave birth to her fourth daughter, Cecilia (1932–2003), who became known as model and actress Suzy Parker. The family moved to Jackson Heights, Queens, soon after Dorian's birth and later to Metuchen, New Jersey. There, George Parker invented a new form of etching acid, the production of which gave him enough income to retire.

Dorian graduated from Newton High School in Queens, New York, in 1935 and enrolled at Randolph-Macon Women's College in Lynchburg, Virginia. In her autobiography, Dorian claimed that she was born in 1920, and graduated from high school early in 1935, at the age of 15. She claimed this was because she loved learning, and she took many classes at once since the school was supposedly overcrowded. But this later proved untrue. She also wrote that she was a 17-year-old college sophomore when she first married, when in fact, she was 20. Her first husband was Marshall Powell Hawkins, whom she married on a whim in North Carolina in 1937. They had two children: Thomas Lofton (T.L.) Hawkins (1939–2014) and Marsha Hawkins (born 1940). The couple separated in the 1940s.

After college, Dorian worked as a file clerk at a department store in Manhattan and as a tabulator, keeping track of radio program ratings. Dorian found that she had an aptitude for math, mechanical engineering, and drawing. She began to go to night school at Rutgers and said she learned about mechanical engineering at New York University. According to her autobiography, she enrolled at the Stevens Institute of Technology in Hoboken, New Jersey, and received a B.S. in mechanical engineering. This was after an aptitude-testing laboratory (the Johnson O'Connor Foundation) informed her that she had a talent for engineering.

Dorian worked at Bell Laboratories, then during World War II, was a tool designer at Eastern Air Lines (with their Eastern Aircraft division). Dorian assisted in the design of airplane wings, beginning at 65 cents an hour and ending up with an hourly wage of $1.00. After failing to be promoted because she was a woman and because of a wartime freeze on positions, Dorian quit and took a job with Republic Pictures as an apprentice copywriter. While writing ad copy for the B movies Republic created and distributed to movie houses, she was encouraged by a Mrs. Wayburn to try modeling.

=== Modeling career ===
Taking Mrs. Wayburn's advice, in 1944 Dorian went to the Harry Conover modeling agency. At 27, Dorian was not only old by modeling standards, but at barely 5'5", she was shorter than the other models at the agency. Conover immediately sent her to see Diana Vreeland, the editor of Harper's Bazaar. Dorian met with Vreeland and fashion photographer Louise Dahl-Wolfe, who were intrigued by her zig-zagged eyebrows. Vreeland warned her, "Do not -- do not do anything to those eyebrows!" Vreeland asked Dorian to return the next day, to be photographed for the cover of the June 1944 issue of Harper's Bazaar, her very first modeling assignment. Conover told her to tell them she was 19 years old. Later they were shocked to discover her real age (27), and that she already had two children.

Dorian's parents thought modeling was not respectable, so Dorian used only her first and middle name during her career. When Dorian became an enormous success though, they thought it was acceptable that their youngest daughter Suzy use the Parker last name when she also became a famous model. Their second eldest daughter, Florian, also had modeling photos in Vogue and Harper's Bazaar, but quit when she married a man in the military, and was living in Oahu when Pearl Harbor was bombed in 1941.

Dorian quickly became busy with modeling assignments, landing on the covers of major magazines such as Vogue, Harper's Bazaar, Paris Match, LIFE, and Elle. Because of her schedule, Dorian's two children were sent to live with her parents in Florida, while she was based in New York City and traveling to Europe.

In 1946, Dorian appeared on the cover of six American Vogue magazines. She worked with famous fashion photographers Irving Penn, John Rawlings, Cecil Beaton, and Paul Radkai. She dated Irving Penn, who later married another model, Lisa Fonssagrives. On one assignment, she argued with Paul Radkai's wife Karen, who wanted to be a fashion photographer and to take many extra, and free, photos of Dorian for her portfolio. When Dorian balked at having to pose for Karen without being paid, Karen warned her she would "ruin her." Indeed, Vogue never used Dorian again, and Karen became a Vogue photographer for many years.

Dorian easily transitioned to working with Harper's Bazaar's new, young photographer, Richard Avedon. Avedon would become one of the most famous photographers in history. While living in her apartment in New York, a young author, Truman Capote, visited a friend in an apartment near hers. Capote was fascinated by Dorian's lifestyle of non-stop men, coming and goings, and having a store across the street handle her phone calls, since there were no answering machines back in the early 1950s. He struck up a friendship with Dorian and called her "Happy-go-lucky." Capote's character Holly Golightly in his famous 1958 novel Breakfast at Tiffany's is said to be largely based on Dorian's life, as well as socialite Gloria Vanderbilt's.

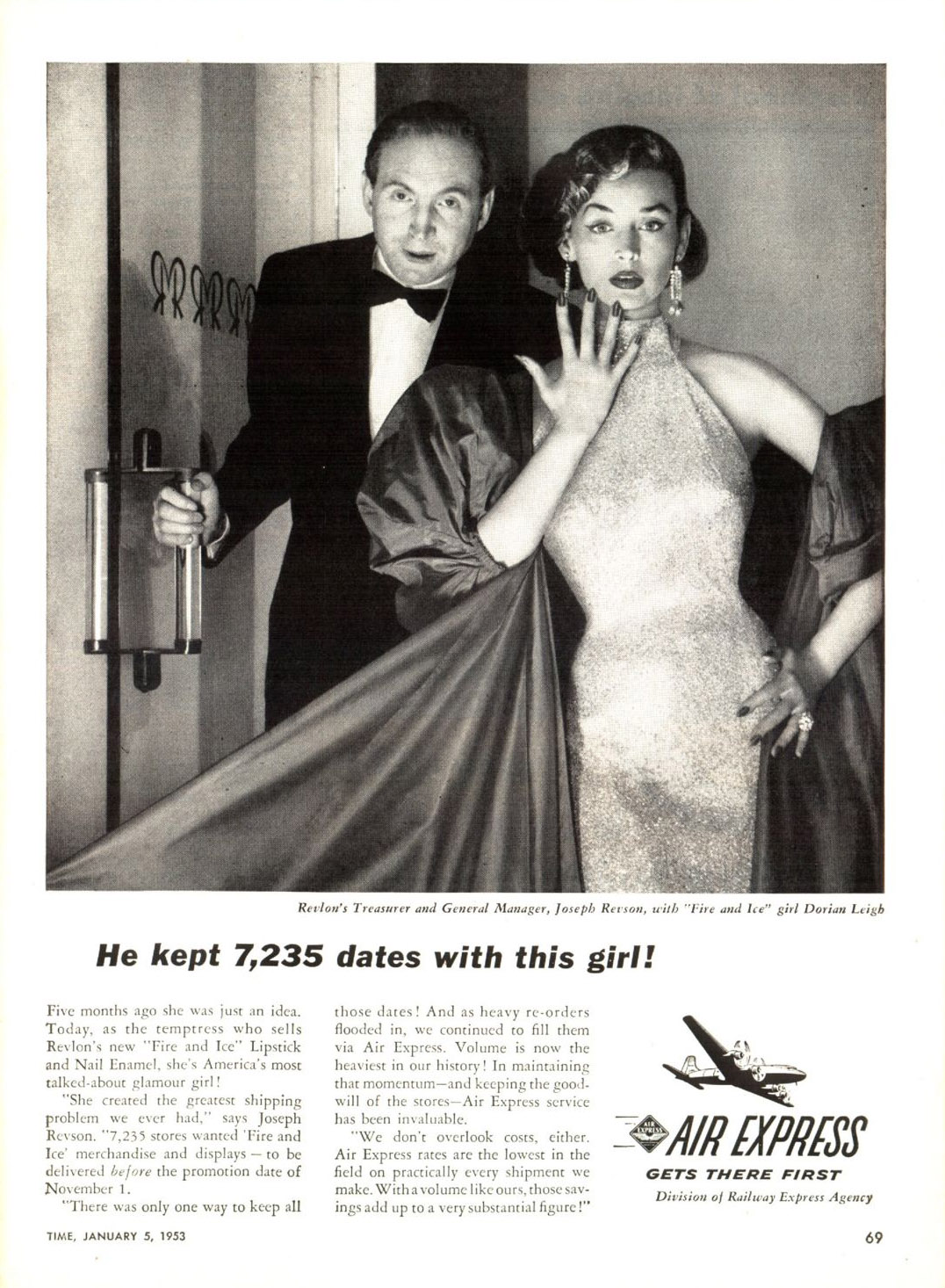
Dorian Leigh with Joseph Revson from Revlon in an ad for Railway Express Agency's Air Express division, 1953

Dorian also became well known for her advertising work for Revlon. Revlon began full-page, national, color advertisements around 1944. Dorian's first ad was for "Fatal Apple" and was followed by "Sheer Dynamite," "Ultraviolet", "Fashion Plate", and "Cherries in the Snow." In 1952, when she was 35 years old, Avedon photographed her for Revlon's most famous advertising campaign, Fire and Ice. In this two-page advertisement, Dorian is wearing a very tight, silver sequined gown swathed in a huge red wrap that was copied from a Balenciaga original. The dress had hand-sewn silver sequins on it, and it took so long to create that only the front of the dress was finished in time to be photographed for the ad. The back was non-existent and held in place with safety pins. Dorian also had a silver streak put in her black hair. The original ad had her holding her hand in front of her breast, but the agency considered the photo too risqué, and the photo was re-shot. The ad was accompanied by a provocative quiz written by Kay Daly, and it became an enormous success, winning Advertising Age's "Magazine Advertisement of the Year" award.

Around 1947, Dorian's sister Florian introduced her to Roger Mehle. He was divorced from Aileen Mehle, who later became the very famous gossip columnist known as "Suzy." Florian was married to an army officer and Mehle was the youngest Navy commander and fighter ace during WWII. In August 1948, Dorian was two months pregnant when she married Mehle. Her bridemaids were her teen sister Suzy and Suzy's teen model friend Carmen Dell'Orefice. Dorian's two older children, who were being raised by her parents in Pomona Park, Florida, came to live with the couple in Pennsylvania.

During her marriage to Mehle, Dorian became fed up with Harry Conover's agency. Conover's phones were often busy and it took a very long time for the clients to pay the models for their work. She decided to start her own modeling agency called the Fashion Bureau, and devised a "voucher system" method for paying the models. With this innovative system, the modeling agency would pay the models weekly, instead of the models having to wait to be paid directly by the clients. Often it took companies weeks, months, or even years to pay models for their work.

One day, at a photographer's studio, Dorian met a young fashion stylist named Eileen Ford. Ford asked how Dorian's modeling agency worked and then decided to start an agency of her own. Eileen, along with her husband Gerard W. Ford, started what would become one of the most prestigious modeling agencies in the world, Ford Models.

Dorian closed her agency when she married. She then telephoned Eileen Ford and told her that she would join the Ford Agency if they also signed her 15-year-old sister, Suzy Parker, sight-unseen. Suzy, 15 years younger than Dorian, had already been working for the Huntington Hartford agency making $25 per hour. Dorian told Ford she believed Suzy should be making $40 per hour. The Fords' agency was only two years old, so they were anxious to represent a famous model like Dorian. They agreed to meet Dorian and Suzy for lunch. Dorian was thin, had an extremely small waist, and had black hair and bright blue eyes. The Fords were shocked during their initial meeting to see that Suzy was almost six inches taller than Dorian and had a larger frame, bright red hair, freckles, and green eyes. In the 1950s, Suzy would become even more famous than Dorian and would go on to be a movie and television actress.

Dorian gave birth to her daughter, Young Eve Mehle, on March 27, 1949. The couple had a house in Bucks County, Pennsylvania but rarely saw each other. Mehle's naval career stationed him in Atlantic City, and Dorian commuted to New York City and Paris for modeling work. She also began to work more often in Europe with Avedon. In 1952, Dorian also played the part of a model in the play The Fifth Season. Her job as model, mother, and actress was featured in Look magazine's June 2, 1953, cover story. By then, she had appeared on the covers of more than 50 magazines. On the Look cover, she is quoted as saying, "I would rather have a baby than a mink coat."

The previous summer in Paris, Dorian had met the married Spanish athlete Alfonso Cabeza de Vaca, Marquis of Portago (Alfonso de Portago). Her children were again sent to live with her parents in Florida. Alfonso (Fon), was 11 years younger than Dorian. She was still married to Mehle, and Portago was also married, to an older American showgirl named Carroll McDaniel who later married Milton Petrie. Portago also had a three-year-old daughter with Carroll. He told Dorian that years before he had seen her "Ultraviolet" Revlon ad in a drugstore in Spain and was captivated. Dorian and Fon were both reluctant to divorce their spouses, but carried on an affair all summer in Paris and Biarritz. Dorian became pregnant by him, but chose to have an abortion because she feared Mehle would divorce her and take full custody of their daughter Young Eve. Only weeks later, at the end of the summer, Fon told Dorian that Carroll was pregnant with their second child. Dorian returned to the United States and divorced Mehle on November 24, 1954, in Mexico. Fon then "married" Dorian right away in Mexico, but since he was not divorced, the marriage was not legal.

Dorian continued her affair with Fon, even though his wife Carroll gave birth to their son Anthony de Portago around 1954. Coco Chanel, who was Suzy's friend, told Dorian that she was "throwing her life away on an idiot." Despite this warning, Dorian got pregnant by Portago again, even though he was still married to Carroll. To avoid a scandalous illegitimate pregnancy and the interest of gossip columnists in the United States, Dorian left her three other children with her parents in Florida and fled to Paris and then Switzerland. In Switzerland, she spent time with Charlie Chaplin's large family before giving birth to her son Kim Blas Parker on September 27, 1955. Dorian did not tell her parents about this child and instead lied and told her family that she was in a tuberculosis clinic. She and Portago continued an on-and-off relationship in 1956 and 1957.

=== Life after modeling ===
Living in France with her baby son Kim, Dorian was nearing 40. Her career as a model was coming to a close, so she began the first legal modeling agency in France to support her son. She had also lent the financially irresponsible Portago about $15,000.

Portago, still married, was now also openly dating actress Linda Christian, the ex-wife of actor Tyrone Power, in early 1957. On April 23, 1957, Dorian's 40th birthday, Portago told Dorian that he was supposedly finally divorcing Carroll so they could be legally married. He told her that he was entering the famous Mille Miglia car race in Italy on May 8, 1957, and Carroll was supposed to sign their divorce papers on May 9. Instead, on May 8, Dorian received a phone call from his mother Olga, informing Dorian that Fon's tire on his Ferrari race car had blown up because he did not stop in time for a tire change. Fon and his co-driver Edmund Nelson were mutilated and killed in a horrifying crash. As well, when the tire exploded and he lost control of the car, nine spectators, including five children, were killed due to the accident. This catastrophe ended the Mille Miglia forever.

A few days after Portago was killed, Dorian's sister Suzy, while making a movie with Cary Grant, told famous gossip columnist Louella Parsons that Dorian had a son with Portago and she was estranged from her sister because of it. Dorian was shocked that Suzy leaked this secret, and Dorian's parents only learned about the child's existence from reading about it in the newspaper. They were furious and told Dorian that she would never have custody of her children. They also refused to accept Kim.

In 1957, Dorian returned to Florida and visited Young at her parents’ home. She then took her daughter, fled to Paris, and remained mostly in France for the following 21 years. Dorian's two older children had graduated high school by this time. She continued to run her modeling agency in Paris and became pregnant by yet another man in 1958. While in the hospital in Paris on June 6, 1958, she received news that Suzy and her father had been in a serious car accident. Suzy's father had apparently not seen or heard an oncoming train and drove onto the tracks where it slammed into his car. They were on their way to visit Suzy's mother, who was in the hospital with cancer. Their father was killed. Suzy's arms were broken and she remained hospitalized for three months. Dorian then had her gynecologist, Dr. Serge Bordat, abort her baby. Days later, she married Dr. Bordat.

Although Dorian already had four children, she wanted another baby, but Serge claimed he was too young. Dorian moved out of their apartment, but they remained legally married. She kept busy with her Paris modeling agency, which now had branches in Hamburg and London, and often traveled to these offices. During a solo ski vacation to Klosters, Switzerland, over Christmas 1960, 43-year-old Dorian slept with four men in one week in an attempt to get pregnant. Three months later, Serge found out through one of Dorian's models that she was pregnant by one of these men. In September 1961, Dorian gave birth to her fifth child, Miranda, in France. She suspected that a young ski instructor at Klosters was the father. She then divorced Serge.

In 1964, 47-year-old Dorian met 23-year-old Israeli writer Iddo Ben-Gurion and they were married. She then discovered Iddo was a drug addict who was embezzling money from her modeling agencies. She divorced him in 1966, and she remained single for the remainder of her life. Dorian eventually had to close her agencies because so much money had been stolen by Iddo. Most of her modeling fortune had either been stolen or spent recklessly.

In 1972, Dorian became a born-again Christian at the urging of her sister Georgiabell and daughter Young. Living in Paris, she studied at Le Cordon Bleu and opened and ran her own restaurant, Chez Leigh, from 1973 to 1975. She tried to get cooking jobs in Corsica and Orleans, as well. By 1976, she was broke.

In 1977, Dorian received a phone call from the New York City modeling agent Stewart Cowley asking her to work as his office manager, so she agreed to return to New York, which was also where her 21-year-old son Kim was living. Kim's half-brother Anthony de Portago also lived in New York and the two had become good friends. However, Dorian soon discovered that Kim had developed a serious drug addiction, and she sent him to live with her sister Suzy in California briefly. He was told to leave when it was discovered that he was continuing to use drugs in their home. Kim then returned to New York, and only six months after Dorian had resettled and reunited with him, he jumped 33 floors from his apartment window to his death, leaving a suicide note behind. Over a decade later, on March 6, 1990, Anthony de Portago died of AIDS.

After Kim's death, Dorian lived in Pound Ridge, New York, where she made pâtés for delicatessens and specialty food shops, according to a profile in The New York Times by Enid Nemy. She also worked with Martha Stewart in the early 1980s and wrote two cookbooks, Pancakes: From Flapjacks to Crepes (1987) and Doughnuts: Over 3 Dozen Crullers, Fritters and Other Treats (1994) at the age of 77.

== Autobiography ==
In 1980, Dorian published an autobiography, The Girl Who Had Everything (Doubleday).

According to Dorian, she wrote her autobiography for her late son: "I really wrote it for Kim, who will never read it. But perhaps other Kims and their parents may learn from my unhappy experiences".

== Death ==
Dorian died in a Falls Church, Virginia, nursing home from Alzheimer's disease at the age of 91 in 2008. In her obituary, her first son, Thomas Lofton (T.L.) Hawkins, reminisced about his mother's famous "Fire and Ice" photograph.

Dorian was survived by three of her five children: son T.L., who later married Kristie Miller, daughter of Ruth Elizabeth McCormick, and daughters Young Eve and Miranda Olga. Dorian's son Blaise (Kim) and daughter Marsha Lynn predeceased her. She was also survived by several grandchildren and one remaining Parker sister, Florian, who died at the age of 92 in 2010.
