= Gucci Westman =

American makeup artist and cosmetic designer

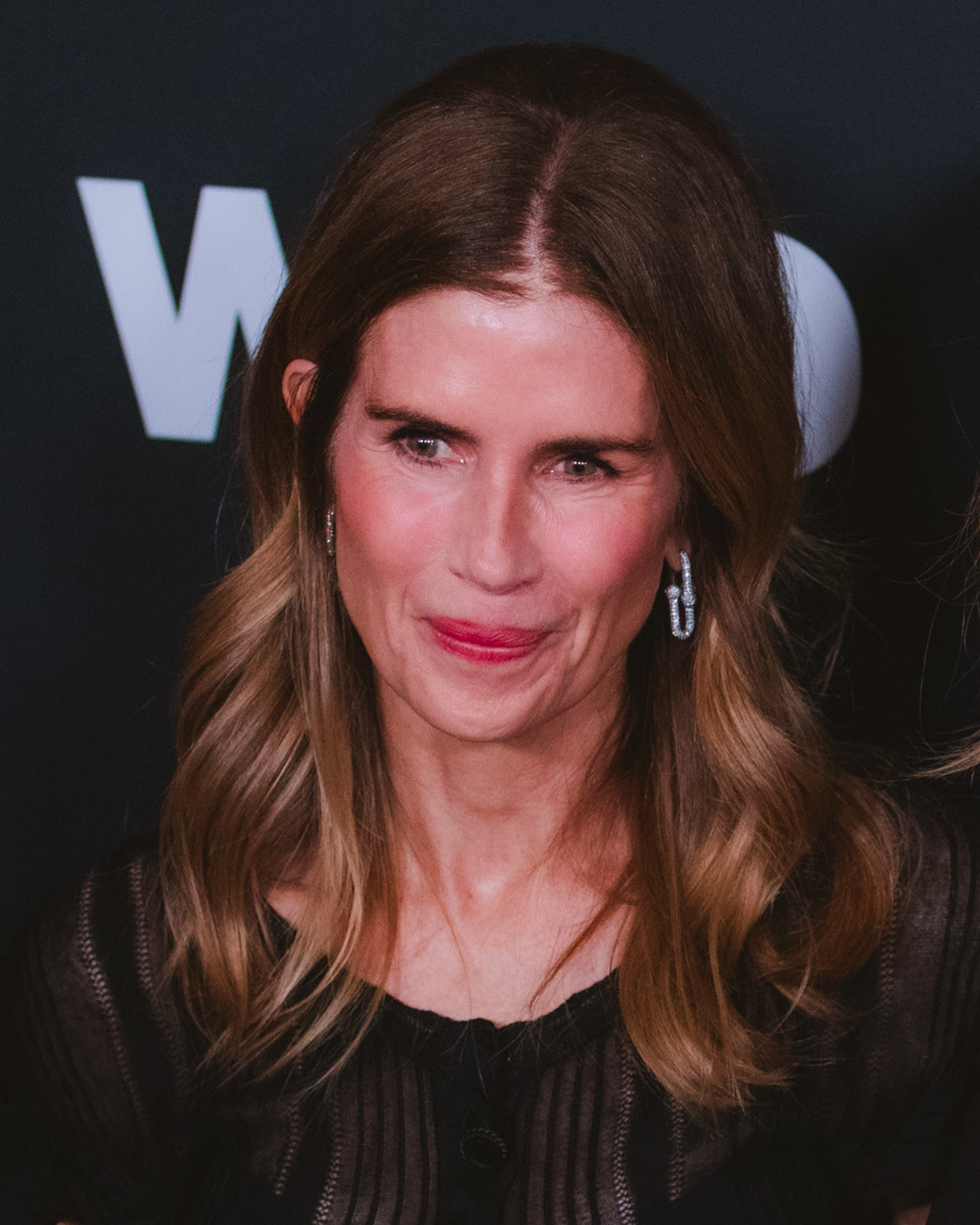
- Westman in 2026
- Born: Chelsea Westman; 18 October 1970 (age 55); Sweden
- Other name: Gucci Westman Neville
- Occupations: Make-up artist, cosmetic designer
- Spouse: David Neville

Gucci Westman is an American makeup artist, cosmetic designer, and founder of the cosmetics line Westman Atelier. She is recognized for her work in creating makeup looks that emphasize minimalism and natural finishes.

She is listed among the BoF's 500, a professional index highlighting influential figures in the fashion industry as determined by The Business of Fashion.

She served as the International Artistic Director of Lancôme from 2003-2007 and Global Artistic Director of Revlon from 2008-2015.

== Career ==
=== Celebrity work ===
Westman has collaborated with high-profile celebrities such as Drew Barrymore, Natalie Portman, Gwyneth Paltrow, and Cameron Diaz. While working with Revlon, Westman worked with Halle Berry, Jessica Alba, Elle Macpherson, Jennifer Connelly, and Jessica Biel. Westman worked as a makeup artist and supervisor on Hollywood movies such as Being John Malkovich, Buffalo '66 and French Exit. Westman had a cameo role in the film version of Sex and the City in 2008. She did the makeup for Emily Ratajkowski at the 2022 Met Gala.

=== Magazine covers ===
Westman worked as a makeup artist for cover models including Reese Witherspoon, Taylor Swift, Jennifer Aniston, Kim Kardashian, Cameron Diaz, and Nicole Kidman for Allure, Vogue, and W covers in the United States and Australia. She is frequently mentioned in Vogue.

=== Runway work ===
Westman has done the makeup of runway models for Oscar de la Renta, Richard Chai, Diane von Furstenberg, Marchesa, Badgley Mischka, Devi Kroell, John Patrick, Ecco Domani and Rag & Bone during New York Fashion Week and Antonio Berardi during London Fashion Week.

=== Cosmetic design ===
Westman was hired by Lancôme in 2003 as the brand's International Artistic Director. Her responsibilities included representing the brand at fashion and beauty events, styling models for company advertising shoots, and designing cosmetic color collections for the label. In 2008, Westman began a new, similar career as the Global Artistic Director for Revlon, creating the "Daydreamer" and "Suede Rhapsody" seasonal shade collections. In April 2015, she stepped down from her position at Revlon after seven years.

Westman launched her own cosmetic line, Westman Atelier, in early 2018.

== Personal life ==
Westman was born in 1970 in California. Her birth name was Chelsea, but she was given the name Grucharan in the kundalini yoga ashram where she resided prior to moving to Sweden with her father when she was ten. Westman was married in 2006 to Rag & Bone fashion designer David Neville. Westman and Neville have three children, Dashel, Gray and Petal.
