= Kelly Hanna =

American make-up artist

Kelly Hanna (born Kelly Thackeray on January 2, 1978) is an American makeup artist and hairstylist. She is most known for her unconventional use of color and false-lash application. She is easily recognized by her outlandish hair colors and penchant for wearing vintage hats. Kelly was called "the most exciting thing to happening in makeup artistry" by Salon Magazine.

== Early life ==
Kelly Hanna was raised mostly in Utah, having spent a brief amount of time in California and Hawaii. At an early age she showed an interest in the beauty industry, often dying and cutting her own hair. Encouraged by her parents to be self-enterprising, Kelly started charging classmates $1 to paint their nails at lunchtime during middle school. She then used the money to get a subscription to Vogue magazine at age 12. During high school, she would cut hair in her mother's kitchen and made up friends with drugstore makeup.

== Career ==
After attending college, Kelly decided to return to her original career: Hair stylist. She briefly attended Dallas Roberts Academy but then returned to graduate from Taylor Andrews Academy cosmetology school in Salt Lake City. She would eventually become a nail and makeup artistry instructor for Taylor Andrews Academy and attribute much of her success to her time spent there. It would be in Park City, Utah at the Sundance Film Festival that Kelly would do make up on her first celebrity client—she described the experience to the New York Daily News: "The very first celebrity I ever worked on was Paris Hilton. I was brand new and told her she was very beautiful. She was actually very sweet and just wanted very natural makeup with smoky eyes."

Spurred by a contentious divorce, Kelly moved to New York City to focus on her career and began working for MAC Cosmetics at the New York Pro Showroom. In New York City, Kelly became known as a celebrity makeup artist by headlining a series of high-profile "fashion preview" parties for New York Girl Style. While she refuses to "name names", she admits to doing "many celebrity faces--people a girl from Utah could only dream of seeing in a tabloid; not actually in front of me!" She has been known to do makeup for Cynthia Nixon, Liv Tyler, Kelly Ripa, Lucy Liu, and the cast of Gossip Girl. While her work is often seen on the runway during New York Fashion Week, she has been published in Elle, La Moderna, Modern Bride, Gothic Beauty and Salon Magazines.
