= Linda Cantello =

British make-up artist

Linda Cantello is a British makeup artist.

== Life and career ==
Cantello was born in Britain. She did not have any formal training in makeup artistry before she began working as a makeup artist.

She created the modern smoky eye makeup look in the early 1990s, for a Gucci runway show.

She became the international makeup artist for the brand Giorgio Armani in 2009. She is noted for creating Rouge d'Armani lipstick in the shade #400 for Armani.

== Awards ==
In 2011 Cantello was named Best Makeup Artist of the Year by Elle China.
