= Sonny Zhou =

Chinese model (born 1983)

- Born: Zhou Bin; 1983 (age 42–43); Shanghai, China
- Modeling information
- Height: 182.5 cm (6 ft 0 in)
- Hair color: Black
- Eye color: Brown

"Sonny" Zhou Bin (born 1983 in Shanghai) is a Chinese model.

She is fluent in English and several Chinese dialects. Zhou has worked on campaigns for Aveda, Dooney & Bourke, Electrolux, L'Oréal, Nordstrom, Revlon, and Shanghai Tang. Her runway credits include Christian Dior, Givenchy, Just Cavalli, Viktor & Rolf, Lacoste, Baby Phat, L.A.M.B. by Gwen Stefani, Lacoste, and Vera Wang.

She is signed to IMG Models (New York City, Milan).
