= Roger W. Mehle =

United States Navy Rear Admiral

Roger William Mehle
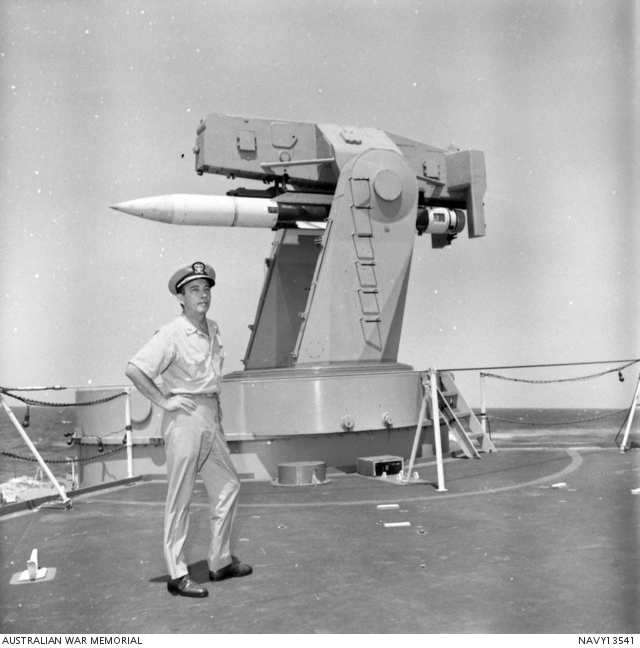
- Task Force 77 commander Rear Admiral Roger Mehle on HMAS Hobart in June 1967
- Born: October 16, 1915; Cincinnati, Ohio, U.S.
- Died: August 30, 1997 (aged 81)
- Military career
- Allegiance: United States of America
- Branch: United States Navy
- Service years: 1937–1970
- Rank: Rear admiral
- Commands: Light Carrier Air Group 28
- Conflicts: World War II; Vietnam War
- Awards: Silver Star; Legion of Merit (3); Distinguished Flying Cross (3)

Roger William Mehle (October 16, 1915 – August 30, 1997) was a United States Navy Rear admiral.

== Early life and education ==
Mehle was born in Cincinnati, Ohio, and attended Walnut Hills High School.

== Career ==
Mehle graduated from the United States Naval Academy in June 1937 and he spent two years serving on the USS New Mexico. He graduated from flight training at Naval Air Station Pensacola in June 1939, then joined VF-3 and carrier-qualified in July 1939. He was then transferred to VF-6 flying the Grumman F4F Wildcat as part of the USS Enterprise's air group.

=== World War II ===
On 1 February, Enterprise's Task Force 8 raided Kwajalein, Wotje, and Maloelap in the Marshall Islands, sinking three ships, damaging eight, and destroying numerous airplanes and ground facilities. That afternoon, the Japanese attempted a counterstrike against the Enterprise, Mehle took off and shot down a Japanese Aichi E13A seaplane and later with two other VF-6 fighters shot down a Mitsubishi G3M bomber. For his actions Mehle was awarded the Distinguished Flying Cross.

On 24 February Mehle and two other VF-6 fighters shot down a Kawanishi H6K near Wake Island.

In March 1942 Mehle became the executive officer of VF-6.

By 1944 Mehle was commander of Light Carrier Air Group 28 aboard the USS Monterey. On 11 June 1944 Mehle shot down two Mitsubishi A6M Zero fighters near the Mariana Islands. On 19 June, Mehle achieved ace status by shooting down two Nakajima B6N torpedo-bombers in the aerial battles that became known as the Great Marianas Turkey Shoot.

On 28 December 1944 Mehle was awarded the Silver Star for gallantry for the period from 15 May to 26 December 1944.

=== Vietnam War ===
From January 1965 to December 1966, Mehle served as Director, Strike Warfare Division, Office of the Chief of Naval Operations and received his first Legion of Merit for this service.

From February to May 1967, Mehle was Commander Attack Carrier Striking Force, Seventh Fleet and from May to September 1967 he was Commander Carrier Division Five.

From July 1968 to June 1970, Mehle served as Commander, Naval Safety Center.

Mehle retired from active service in 1970.

== Personal life ==
Mehle married Aileen Elder in 1939 and they had a son Roger Jr in 1941. They later divorced and Aileen Mehle became famous as a society columnist.

Mehle married model Dorian Leigh in August 1948. Their daughter Young Eve Mehle was born on March 27, 1949. Mehle and Leigh divorced on November 24, 1954.

Mehle married Patricia Joan Joachim in 1956. They had two sons, Lance Renard Mehle (1957), and COL Charles Ramsey Mehle, II (1959).

Mehle died on August 30, 1997 at his home in Virginia Beach, Virginia.
