= Revlon =

American-based multinational personal care company

Revlon, Inc.
- Type: Private
- Industry: Cosmetics, skin care, perfumes and personal care
- Founded: March 1, 1932; 94 years ago in New York City
- Founders: Joseph Revson; Charles Revson; Charles Lachman
- Headquarters: 1 New York Plaza, New York City
- Key people: Ronald Perelman (Chairman); Michelle Peluso (CEO)
- Revenue: ▲US$2.078 Billion (Fiscal Year Ended December 31, 2021)
- Operating income: ▲US$0.103 Billion (Fiscal Year Ended December 31, 2021)
- Net income: ▼US$0.206 Billion (Fiscal Year Ended December 31, 2021)
- Total assets: ▼US$2.432 Billion (Fiscal Year Ended December 31, 2021)
- Total equity: ▼US$2.014 Billion (Fiscal Year Ended December 31, 2021)
- Owner: MacAndrews & Forbes (84.7%)
- Number of employees: approx. 5,800 (Fiscal Year Ended December 31, 2021)
- Website: revlon.com

Revlon, Inc., is an American multinational company dealing in cosmetics, skin care, perfume, and personal care. The headquarters of Revlon was established in New York City on March 1, 1932, where it remains. Revlon was founded by brothers Charles and Joseph Revson, and chemist Charles Lachman. Revlon products are sold in 150 countries and the company has many global locations including Mexico City, London, Paris, Hong Kong, Indonesia, South Africa, Sydney, Singapore, and Tokyo.

In June 2022, Revlon filed for Chapter 11 bankruptcy. It emerged from bankruptcy in May 2023.

== History ==
=== Founding and Charles Revson control (1932–1975) ===
Revlon was founded in New York City on March 1, 1932, in the midst of the Great Depression, by Jewish American brothers Charles Revson and Joseph Revson along with a chemist, Charles Lachman, who contributed the "L" in the Revlon name. The three men started with one single product, a new type of nail enamel and pooled their resources to develop a unique manufacturing process. Using pigments instead of dyes, Revlon developed a variety of new shades of nail enamel. In 1937, Revlon started selling the polishes in department stores and pharmacies. In six years, the company became a multimillion-dollar organization. By 1940, Revlon offered an entire manicure line and added lipstick to the collection. During World War II, Revlon formed the Vorset Corporation to manufacture pyrotechnics for the US Army-Navy. They made various products to support the war effort, including first-aid kits, hand grenades, and dye markers. For this, in 1944 Revlon won the Army-Navy "E" Award for Excellence.

By the end of World War II, Revlon was the number two cosmetics producer in the United States. Expanding its capabilities, the company bought Graef & Schmidt, a cutlery manufacturer seized by the government in 1943 because of German business ties. The manufacturing plant joined two others owned by Revlon at the time, and was used to manufacture manicure and pedicure instruments.

==== Divisions ====
In the 1960s, Revson segmented Revlon Inc. into different divisions, each focusing on a different market. He borrowed this strategy from General Motors. Each division had its own target customer:

- Revlon, the largest and most popular-priced brand
- Princess Marcella Borghese, upscale/international
- Ultima II, premium
- Natural Wonder, juniors
- Moon Drops, dry skin
- Etherea, hypo-allergenic

==== Early acquisitions ====
In 1957, Revlon acquired Knomark, a shoe-polish company, and sold its shoe-polish line Esquire Shoe Polish in 1969. Other acquisitions, such as Ty-D-Bol, the maker of toilet cleansers, and a 27 percent interest in the Schick electric shaver company, were soon discarded. Evan Picone, a women's sportswear manufacturer with a price tag of $12 million in 1962, was sold back to one of the original partners four years later for $1 million. However, the 1967 acquisition of the U.S. Vitamin and Pharmaceutical Corporation made Revlon a leader in diabetes drugs.

The company began to market its products overseas at the end of the 1950s. By 1962, when Revlon debuted in Japan, there were subsidiaries in France, Italy, Argentina, Mexico, and Asia. In Japan Revlon used its basic U.S. advertising and models instead of adapting its advertisements and using Japanese models. Sales for 1962 came to $164 million.

In 1968, Revlon introduced Eterna27, the first cosmetic cream with an estrogen precursor called Progenitin (pregnenolone acetate). Later Revlon launched Braggi Pub, Bill Blass for men, and a line of wig maintenance products called Wig Wonder. In 1970, Revlon acquired the Mitchum line of deodorants. In 1971, Flex shampoo and conditioner were introduced. In 1973, Revlon introduced Charlie perfume. It was aimed at people under 30 and promoted by model Shelley Hack who was wearing trousers in the advertisements. Shelley Hack appeared on Oprah in 2007 to talk about the power of the Charlie advertisements.

After the introduction of Charlie, Revlon's net sales figures were $506 million in 1973 and $606 million the following year. Launched in 1975, Jontue perfume became the second-best selling fragrance globally. Revlon also owns the perfume brand Jean Nate.

==== Models ====
In 1973, model Lauren Hutton signed an exclusive modeling contract, agreeing to pose for Revlon's Ultima line for $400,000 for two years, and was portrayed on the cover of Newsweek. Richard Avedon was signed on as the exclusive photographer for the brand.

=== Michel Bergerac control (1975–1985) ===
In 1975, Charles Revson died. Michel Bergerac, whom Revson had hired as president of the company, continued to expand the company holdings. Revlon acquired Coburn Optical Industries, an Oklahoma-based ophthalmic and optical processing equipment and supplies manufacturer. Barnes-Hind, the largest U.S. marketer of hard contact lens solutions, was bought in 1976 and strengthened Revlon's share of the eye-care market. Revlon purchased Armour Pharmaceutical Company, a division of Armour and Company, from The Greyhound Corporation in 1977. Other acquisitions included the Lewis-Howe Company, makers of Tums antacid in 1978. These health-care operations helped sales figures surpass the $1 billion mark in 1977, bringing total sales to $1.7 billion in 1979.

In the mid-1980s, Revlon lost ground to Estée Lauder, and Armour Pharmaceutical's haemophilia product "Factorate" infected many people worldwide with HIV and hepatitis C. Estee Lauder spent millions of dollars on numerous magazine ads featuring Czech supermodel Paulina Porizkova, shot by famed Chicago fashion photographer Victor Skrebneski. Revlon's share dropped from 20 percent to 10 percent of department store cosmetics sales. Sales at the drugstore also declined as Revlon lost shares to Noxell's Cover Girl brand. Revlon compensated with more acquisitions; Max Factor, Ellen Betrix, Charles of the Ritz, Germaine Monteil, Almay, Fermodyl, Lancaster, Aziza, and Halston. The 1977 acquisition of Carlos Colomer, a Spanish professional beauty supply distributor, brought Fermodyl and Roux and helped introduce Revlon to the world of ethnic care: Creme of Nature, Realistic, Lovely Color and Milk and Honey. In 1983 the company attempted an unsuccessful hostile takeover of Gillette. In 1989, Revlon became one of the first companies to replace animal tests with alternative safety testing methods.

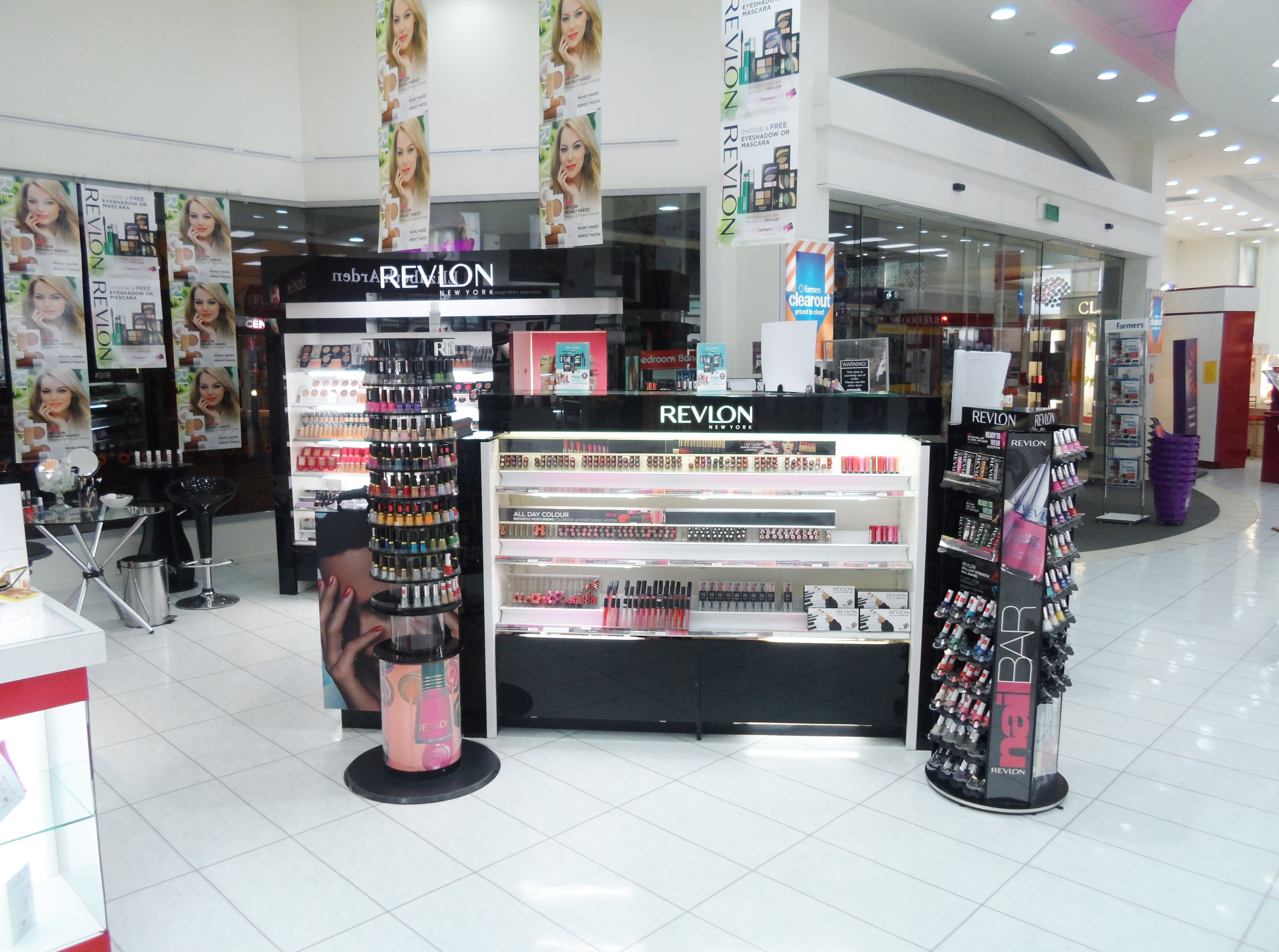
Revlon counter in New Zealand department store Farmers

=== Ronald Perelman control (since 1985) ===
On November 5, 1985, at a price of $58 per share, totaling $2.7 billion, Revlon was sold to Pantry Pride (later renamed to Revlon Group, Inc.), a subsidiary of Ronald Perelman's MacAndrews & Forbes. The buyout—engineered with the help of junk bond king Michael P. Milken—saddled Revlon with a huge $2.9 billion debt load, which became an albatross around the company's neck for years to come. Pantry Pride Inc. offered to buy any or all of Revlon's 38.2 million outstanding shares for $47.5 a share when its street price stood at $45 a share. Initially rejected, he repeatedly raised his offer until it reached $53 a share while fighting Revlon's management every step of the way. Forstmann Little & Company swooped in at $56 a share, a brief public bidding war ensued, and Perelman triumphed with an offer of $58 a share. Perelman paid $1.8 billion to Revlon's shareholders, but he also paid $900 million of other costs associated with the purchase. Perelman filed suit in the Delaware Court of Chancery to force Revlon to accept Perelman's offer, and the resulting appellate decision, Revlon v. MacAndrews & Forbes Holdings, was a landmark case in determining the obligations of public company directors in hostile takeover situations under Delaware law.

Perelman had Revlon sell four divisions: two for $1 billion, the vision care division for $574 million, and the National Health Laboratories division which became a publicly owned corporation in 1988. Additional make-up lines were purchased for Revlon: Max Factor in 1987 and Betrix in 1989, later sold to Procter & Gamble in 1991. Also in 1991, Revlon sold the Clean & Clear brand to Johnson & Johnson.

On February 28, 1996, Revlon was listed on the New York Stock Exchange as a public limited company. The IPO price was $24 per share.

==== Timeline (2013-2024) ====
2013

- In August, Revlon Consumer Products Corp. bought the Colomer Group from CVC Capital Partners, a private equity firm, for $660 million.
- After suffering business loss in 2011 and 2012, at the end of 2013, Revlon announced that it will exit the Chinese market, which employs 1,100 people. The business in China accounted for just 2 percent portion of net sales of Revlon's international operations.
- On November 1, Revlon named Lorenzo Delpani as president and CEO.

2014

- In March, Revlon announced leaving midtown to relocate its headquarters to the top two floors of One New York Plaza.
- On September 22, Revlon's board of directors elected Roberto Simon as executive vice president and chief financial officer, effective as of Sept. 30.

2015

- On April 30, Revlon completed the acquisition of U.K. based fragrance management company CBBeauty including its U.K. distributor SAS & Company.

2016

- On June 16, Revlon announced its intention to purchase its competitor Elizabeth Arden, Inc. for $870 million. The acquisition was completed that September.
- Revlon acquired Cutex from Coty Inc.

2017

- In January 29, the company announce that CEO Fabian Garcia would leave the company at the end of February. Board member Paul Meister would become executive vice chairman of the board and run the day-to-day operations.
- A quarterly report from the end of 2017 estimated its quarterly loss falling approximately between $60 million and $80 million.

2018

- In May, the company announced the appointment of Debra Perelman, the daughter of Ronald Perelman, to the position of chief executive officer. She was the first ever female CEO of the company after serving as COO starting in January 2018 and serving on the board since 2015.

2019

- In January, Seeking Alpha published an article regarding trading anomalies on the Revlon stock (REV); it is under investigation.

2020

- In August, American bank Citi wrongly wired $900 million to creditors of Revlon. The wire sparked a "protracted legal fight". In October of the same year, the bank was fined $400 million by the US bank regulators as a result of their risk in control systems and was ordered to update their technology.

2021

- PETA removed Revlon and other high-profile cosmetic brands from its list of companies who do not test their products on animals after the organization learned they were paying Chinese laboratories to test their cosmetics on rabbits and other animals.
- On September 28, the UK's Infected Blood Inquiry heard evidence about Armour's use of hemophilia treatment products during the 1970s and 80s, which caused Hepatitis C and HIV infections, including its period under the control of Revlon Healthcare.

2024

- In October, it was announced Michelle Peluso, formerly of CVS Health, Gilt Groupe, and Travelocity would be joing as CEO of the company.

==== Bankruptcy protection ====
On June 16, 2022, Revlon filed for Chapter 11 bankruptcy protection after struggling with debt, rising competition, supply chain challenges, and falling behind evolving beauty standards. A few hours after the bankruptcy announcement, Revlon's shares lost more than 13% of their value. According to a filing with the U.S. Bankruptcy Court for the Southern District of New York, Revlon listed assets and liabilities between $1 billion and $10 billion. Revlon which had been managed by Perelman's daughter Debra Perelman since mid-2018, had long-term debt of $3.31 billion as of March 31, 2022. The company narrowly avoided bankruptcy in 2020 after restructuring its debt. It was one of the last remaining holdings of Ronald Perelman. Bloomberg News reported that the company's bankruptcy process could be "complicated by financial controversies." MarketWatch quoted industry analysts and commentators as saying that bankruptcy would allow the firm a chance to refresh and regroup as it attempts to compete with newer brands, like Kylie Cosmetics or Fenty. CNBC reported that Revlon's bankruptcy might be the start of broader bankruptcy problems for the retail sector. It was delisted from the NYSE on October 21, 2022. In December 2022, Revlon announced plans to raise $650 million in equity and transferring majority of the ownership to senior leaders. The company also announced plans to wipe out the interests of Ronald Perelman by striking an agreement with creditors to give lenders and bondholders ownership of the bankrupt cosmetics maker.

In February 2023, Revlon reached a lender settlement that would allow the company to exit from bankruptcy by April.

== Advertising ==
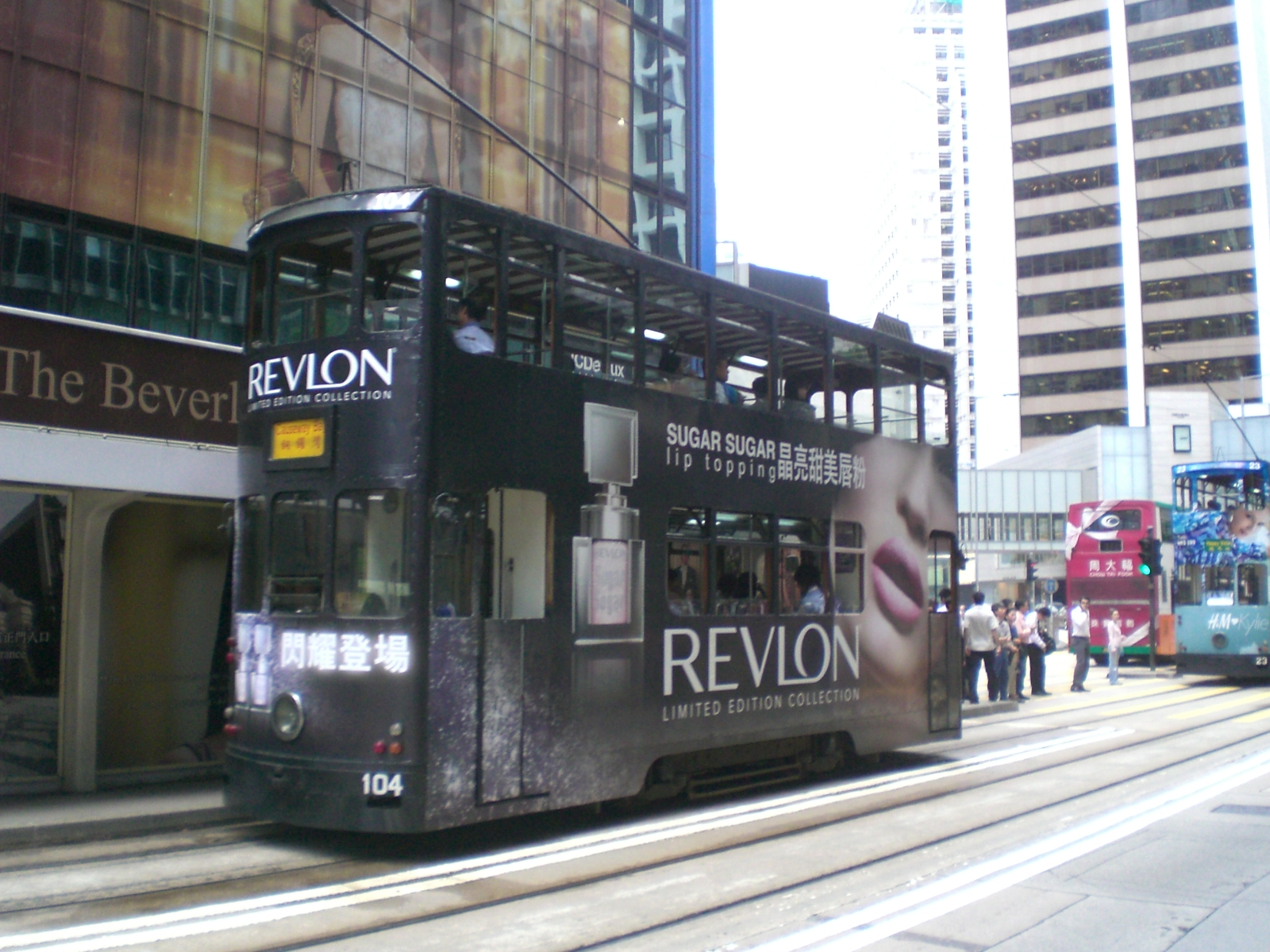
Tram with Revlon advertising in Hong Kong, June 2007

Until the 1940s, Revlon's magazine ads were drawn by hand and mostly in black and white. In 1945, Revlon began launching full-color photographic advertisements in major magazines and stores across the country. Revlon introduced matching nail polish and lipsticks with exotic and unique names. These ads were taken by the top fashion photographers of the day including Richard Avedon, Cecil Beaton, and John Rawlings. Some of these ads were for "Paint the Town Pink" and 1945's "Fatal Apple" with Dorian Leigh. In 1947, Revlon introduced "Bachelor's Carnation" and in 1948, "Sweet Talk".

In 1950, Revlon introduced a red lipstick and nail enamel called "Where's the Fire?", and later used "Fire and Ice" ads. One of the world's first supermodels, Dorian Leigh, starred in some of Revlon's most memorable advertisements of all time. In 1946, Dorian was covered in purple flowers and wrapped in a pale purple sheet for "Ultra Violet." In 1947, Dorian appeared in "Fashion Plate." In 1953, at the age of 36, she appeared in "Cherries in the Snow." Later that year she appeared in the legendary "Fire and Ice" ad shot by Richard Avedon. Originally, Dorian appeared in a tight, silver-beaded dress with an enormous red wrap. Her black hair had a silver swirl in it and she had her hands, with long red nails, positioned in front of her breasts. Charles Revson rejected Avedon's original ad as "too sexual." They re-shot the ad, this time with her open hand in front of one hip, the other in front of her cheek. The advertisement became and advertising legend because of the full-page quiz next to the sensual ad. Almost 50 years later, in November 2010, Revlon re-created 1953's "Fire and Ice" magazine ad with actress Jessica Biel, and announced that they were issuing a limited-edition Fire and Ice lipstick and nail color, calling this campaign, "lips and tips."

Dorian Leigh's 15-years-younger red-headed sister, Suzy Parker, also shot numerous Revlon magazine ads in the 1950s. Suzy and Charles Revson, who wanted to marry Dorian at some point, despised each other. At one point, he refused to hire Suzy anymore because she complained about the "peanut" paycheck she received from Revlon. Richard Avedon, however, after photographing other models for a particular Revlon ad, would call in Suzy at the last minute, sometimes late at night, to do re-takes with him. This happened with "Stormy Pink," an ad Suzy shot very late at night with a wild white horse in the ocean. Avedon would then tell Revson that it was not Suzy in the ad, but a model named "Bubbles" or another made-up name.

In 1970, Revlon became the first American cosmetics company to feature an African American model, icon Naomi Sims, in their advertising. In the late 1970s, Revlon also made history when it created their line of cosmetics, specifically for women of color, called "The Polished Ambers Collection" and selected fashion model icon Iman to be featured in the advertising campaigns. Revlon was also noted for featuring models of a wide age range in the 1980s, including 13-year-old Milla Jovovich and 60-year-old Audrey Hepburn. Despite the successful campaigns of the 1980s and 1990s featuring models, in particular Cindy Crawford, Revlon decided to drop fashion models and focus on movie stars, among them Kate Bosworth, Jaime King, Halle Berry, Susan Sarandon, Melanie Griffith, Julianne Moore, Eva Mendes, Jessica Alba, Jennifer Connelly, Beau Garrett, Jessica Biel, Olivia Wilde, Emma Stone, and Bond girls. In 2009, Australian supermodel Elle Macpherson became one of a long line of spokesmodels for the company. American actress Jessica Biel modeled for the brand, first shown in advertisements in January 2010.

In 2008, celebrity makeup artist Gucci Westman was hired as Revlon's Global Artistic Director, representing the company at runway shows and brand events and designing collections. In 2017, Gwen Stefani became the global ambassador of the cosmetic brand. In 2020, Korean-American singer, actress and fashion designer Jessica Jung was announced as the new global ambassador for the company. In 2023, the digital artist Nailea Devora became the new Revlon Global Brand Ambassador. In January 2024, Madelyn Cline became Revlon's Global Brand Ambassador.

== Philanthropy ==
Revlon is a corporate sponsor of several charity projects. The largest of these is the Revlon Run Walk, founded in 1994, in partnership with the Entertainment Industry Foundation. It is a run and walk event held in New York and Los Angeles to raise money and awareness for breast and ovarian cancer, which has raised and distributed more than $70 million to women's cancer research and support programs since its inception. Revlon also supports other cancer charities such as Look Good Feel Better and the National Breast Cancer Coalition and operates a mobile mammography clinic in and around Oxford, North Carolina, where the company's primary manufacturing operations are located. In 1996, Revlon supported the development of a breast center at the University of California, Los Angeles. Renamed Revlon/UCLA Breast Center, the center is a well-known institute for treatment and research of breast cancer and other breast diseases and disorders. A Revlon lip gloss shade whose proceeds support Revlon's cancer charities was also created in 2009.

In September 2010, Revlon, with global artistic director Gucci Westman and spokesmodel Halle Berry hosted an event at Fashion's Night Out in New York City to raise funds for the Jenesse Center, a Los Angeles organization for domestic violence victims. Revlon also hosted luncheons and various other events to benefit the center and partnered with then-online retailer drugstore.com to donate portions of lipstick sales to the organization.

In September 2015, Revlon donated $1 million through its LOVE IS ON million-dollar challenge dedicated to women's cancer, heart disease, and diabetes. In 2016, hosted its second LOVE IS ON million-dollar challenge to raise for women's health-related causes.

In 2018, the company launched an Employee Volunteer Program (EVP) which was created to provide each full time U.S. employee with eight hours of time to engage in community service.

== Controversies ==
=== Quiz Show Scandal (1950s) ===
In the 1950s, Revlon sponsored the TV Quiz Show The $64,000 Question, an alliance that tripled cosmetic sales. Charles Revson allegedly pressured producers to coaching popular contestants that boosted publicity for Revlon's ads. Suspicion rose after Joyce Brothers won by answering boxing questions, though she was not implicated in cheating. Congressional hearings in 1958 revealed widespread rigging across networks, prompting cancellations and leading to the 1960 Communications Act's ban on fixing broadcast contests.

=== Pharmaceutical Health Scandal (1970s–80s) ===
From 1977 to 1986, Armour Pharmaceutical, a company owned by Revlon, manufactured plasma-based treatments for hemophilia. During this time, thousands of patients worldwide were infected with HIV and hepatitis C after using the products.

=== Hair Relaxer Lawsuit (2024) ===
Revlon and other cosmetics companies were sued after a U.S. government study linked chemical hair relaxers to higher risks of uterine cancer. Thousands of women, many of them Black consumers, alleged that manufacturers failed to warn them about potential dangers despite long-term marketing toward communities of color. In 2024, a federal judge allowed a class action to proceed for reimbursement claims, while separate lawsuits accuse the companies of negligence, defective design, and inadequate safety warnings.

== See also ==
- List of Revlon spokesmodels
