= Michael Maron =

American makeup artist, author, and entrepreneur

Michael Maron is an American makeup artist, author, beauty industry entrepreneur, photographer, and media personality known for pioneering before-and-after celebrity makeovers on live television, print and video.

== Early life ==
Maron was born in New York and grew up in southern California. He became a professional portrait artist at the age of twelve, dabbled in acting and modeling, appeared in television commercials, and hosted his own radio show on KCRW National Public Radio. After earning a master's degree in filmmaking and television production at UCLA, he joined the UCLA Theater Arts teaching staff and did production work on numerous primetime television shows. A self-taught photographer, Maron specialized in fashion and beauty photography as well as makeup design. Known for personally making up his photography clients, his work caught the eye of legendary model/agent, Wilhelmina Cooper, founder of Wilhelmina Models, who helped launch his career.

== Career ==
One of his first televised appearances was a makeover on comedian Phyllis Diller on The Merv Griffin Show. That episode won an Emmy Award. He has appeared multiple times on The Oprah Winfrey Show and was spotlighted as Oprah's solo guest of the hour, making her over in front of millions of viewers. His roster of clients includes show business beauties, top models and legendary film stars. Maron has been featured in scores of magazines and television shows.

Maron appears on talk shows as a beauty and lifestyle commentator. He was co-founder and developer of two successful cosmetic lines on QVC in the U.S., Britain and Germany, and has been one of QVC's long-term, on-air guests and resident beauty authorities.

As former makeup consultant to the American Society of Plastic Surgeons, his expertise has been sought after by cosmetic surgeons throughout the U.S. In addition to speaking at medical symposiums and his appearances on the lecture circuit, he has served as spokesperson and consultant for Fortune 500 companies, including Clairol, Matrix Essentials, Shaklee Corporation, Unilever, and the Miss Universe Organization.

== Books ==
Maron's first book, Child Inside Me, was followed by his bestseller, Michael Maron's Instant Makeover Magic. Written and photographed by Maron, this was the first beauty book to show famous Hollywood stars without a stitch of makeup.

Maron began specializing in advanced corrective makeup techniques for burn survivors and individuals with "facial differences". His next book, Makeover Miracles, was the first beauty book to combine corrective cosmetics with cosmetic surgery and anti-aging strategies. Dr. Elliott H. Rose, reconstructive surgeon and Associate Clinical Professor, Mount Sinai Medical Center, Mount Sinai Hospital, author of the medical reference book, Aesthetic Facial Restoration, invited Maron to contribute a chapter on corrective cosmetic techniques.

== Charities ==
Maron devotes his time and resources to a number of charitable and philanthropic organizations including Operation Smile, and donates his expertise to those in need by conducting makeovers and seminars in burn centers and women's prisons.

Maron currently resides in Los Angeles.

== Media appearances ==
- The Oprah Winfrey Show
- The Merv Griffin Show
- Live with Regis and Kathie Lee
- Good Morning America
- Today
- The Phil Donahue Show
- The Montel Williams Show
- The Jerry Springer Show
- The Sally Jessy Raphael Show
- A.M. Los Angeles
- Home Show
- USA Cable Great American Homemaker
