= Aileen Mehle =

American journalist (1918–2016)

- Born: Aileen Elder; June 10, 1918; El Paso, Texas, U.S.
- Died: November 11, 2016 (aged 98); New York City, New York, U.S.
- Occupation: Society columnist
- Years active: 1950–2005
- Spouse(s): Roger W. Mehle (1939–1946; divorced); Mark Kenneth Frank Jr. (?–1957; divorced)
- Children: Roger Mehle Jr.

Aileen Mehle (née Elder, June 10, 1918 – November 11, 2016), known by the pen name Suzy or Suzy Knickerbocker, was an American society columnist, active in journalism for over fifty years. Her column was syndicated to 100 newspapers and read by over 30 million people.

== Early life ==
Mehle was born on June 10, 1918, in El Paso, Texas, the daughter of Aileen (O'Keefe) and Lawrence Herman Elder, an oil company employee. Mehle moved with her family to California when she was a child. She attended Long Beach Junior College and Santa Barbara State College (now the University of California, Santa Barbara).

In the early 1940s she, her mother and her infant son moved to Florida.

== Career ==
While living in Palm Beach, Mehle became friends with Jan Cox, the wife of the editor of The Miami Daily News. Cox's husband overheard Mehle complaining about the quality of writing in his paper and invited her to submit sample columns; she did, and was hired to cover society news. She adopted the pen name "Suzy" and wrote for the paper until 1957, when she moved to New York. There she was hired by The Mirror, and wrote a column for the paper (which was syndicated by King Features Syndicate) for the next six years, until the paper ceased publishing. In 1963 she took over Igor Cassini's column in the New York Journal-American, which he wrote under the pen name Cholly Knickerbocker. Mehle added this surname to her pen name "Suzy" and became "Suzy Knickerbocker". She wrote six columns a week for the paper, until it closed. Mehle then joined The Daily News, followed by The New York Post. From 1985 to her retirement in 2005, Mehle wrote for Women's Wear Daily, "Architectural Digest" and W magazine.

In 1988, James Revson, a rival gossip columnist at Newsday, accused Mehle of fabricating some of the content of her columns. He alleged that she had reported on parties which she had not attended, instead writing from press releases and guest lists. The situation was referred to as "Suzyscam" and "Suzygate" in the news media and reported widely.

Mehle acknowledged that her writing was centred on the trivial and superficial, and that part of her goal was to bring some glamour to the lives of regular people. She has been also called the "social historian" of her time. Her writing style was considered crisp and colourful, and she was skilled at making flattering observations without risk of hurting a person's reputation.

=== Television appearances ===
In the 1960s, Mehle appeared often as a guest panelist on the game show What's My Line?, perhaps an attempt by the producers to replicate the perky newspaper columnist persona of regular Dorothy Kilgallen, who'd died mysteriously several months prior to Knickerbocker's first guest show. She also appeared as the mystery guest on October 23, 1966. She made a cameo appearance in the Batman TV series.

=== Honours and recognition ===
In 1991, Mehle received an honorary doctorate from Marymount Manhattan College. The school also holds a scholarship fund in her name, the Aileen Mehle Scholarship Fund for Journalism.

== Personal life ==
Mehle married Roger W. Mehle in 1939 and had a son, Roger, in 1941. The couple divorced in 1946. She married a second time, to Mark Kenneth Frank Jr.; they were divorced in 1957.

Aileen Mehle died at her home in Manhattan on November 11, 2016, aged 98.
