= Suzy Parker =

American model and actress (1932–2003)

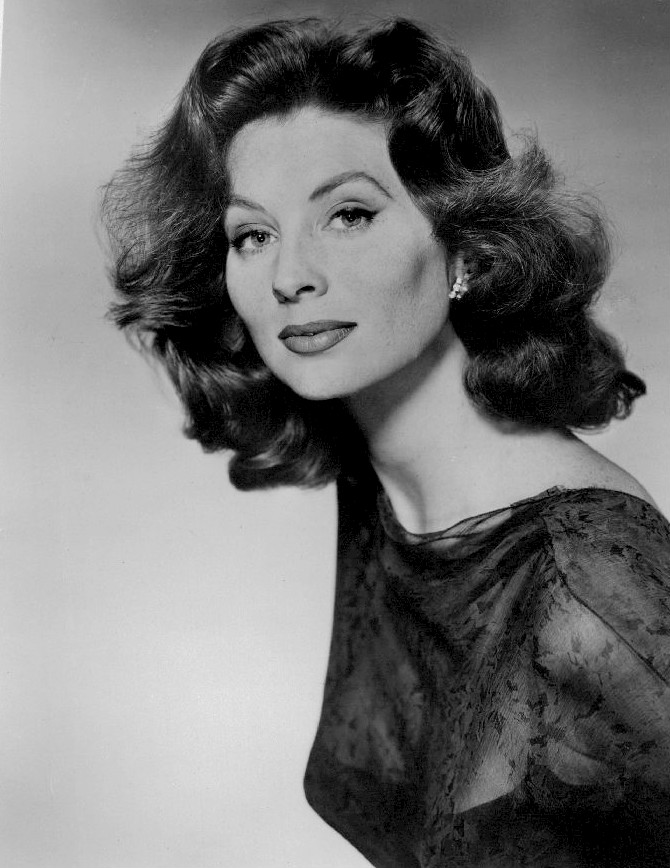
- Suzy Parker in 1963
- Born: Cecilia Ann Renee Parker; October 28, 1932; Long Island City, New York, U.S.
- Died: May 3, 2003 (aged 70); Montecito, California, U.S.
- Other name: Suzy Parker Dillman
- Occupations: Model, actress
- Years active: 1947–1970
- Spouses: Charles Staton (m. 1950; div. 1953) Pierre de la Salle (m. 1958; div. 1961) Bradford Dillman (m. 1963)
- Children: 4
- Relatives: Dorian Leigh ( sister )

Suzy Parker (born Cecilia Ann Renee Parker; October 28, 1932 – May 3, 2003) was an American model and actress active from 1947 until 1970. Her modeling career reached its zenith during the 1950s, when she appeared on the covers of dozens of magazines and in advertisements and movie and television roles.

She appeared in advertisements for Revlon and many other cosmetic companies, including Solo Products, the largest hair care product company in the country at the time. (Models did not have exclusive cosmetic company contracts until Lauren Hutton and Karen Graham in the early 1970s). In 1956, at the height of her modelling career, she became the first model to earn $100,000 per year (equivalent to $1,184,000 in 2025). A song that The Beatles wrote for her, though not released on record, appeared in their 1970 documentary film Let It Be, which won the Academy Award for Best Original Score.

== Early life ==
Suzy Parker was born Cecilia Ann Renee Parker in Long Island City, New York, to George and Elizabeth Parker, who married in 1916. The family later moved to Highland Park, New Jersey, and then to Florida.

She had three older sisters: Dorian, Florian, and Georgiabell. Elizabeth believed she was undergoing menopause, but then discovered she was several months pregnant with her youngest child, Cecilia ("Suzy"). Suzy's original names came from three of her mother's best friends. A then-teenaged Dorian advised her mother to arrange the names in the order, Cecilia Renee Ann Parker, so the initials of the names would spell the word "crap". Dorian claimed her mother had no idea what it meant. Parker's father George disliked the name Cecilia and called her Susie, a name which Parker would retain throughout her life. A French Vogue photographer later changed the spelling to "Suzy".

== Career ==
Parker and two of her sisters were tall, all measuring between 5 ft 10 in (178 cm) and 6 ft 1 in (185 cm). Sister Dorian was the sole exception, standing 5 ft 5 in (165 cm).

In 1944, Dorian worked as an advertising copy writer when a coworker encouraged her to go to the Conover Modeling Agency. Dorian became one of the top models in the world, among the first small group of supermodels, which included Lisa Fonssagrives, Dovima, Barbara Goalen and Bettina Graziani. When Suzy was about age 15, Dorian telephoned Ford Modeling Agency and told Eileen and Jerry Ford that she would sign on with them if they also took her younger sister, sight unseen. Eager to represent Dorian, they agreed. Expecting to meet a similarly petite, extremely thin, flawless, pale-faced, electric blue-eyed, raven-haired younger version of Dorian, they were shocked to meet Suzy for the first time. Parker was already 5'10", big-boned, and had carrot red hair, pale-green eyes, and freckles. She would become more famous than Dorian.

Suzy's photo appeared in Life magazine when she was 15. That same year, one of her first magazine advertisements was for DeRosa Jewelry. Although she still lived with her parents in Florida, she stayed in New York City with Dorian when she had modeling assignments there. Dorian introduced Parker to her fashion-photographer friends, Irving Penn, Horst P. Horst, John Rawlings, and a young Richard Avedon. Parker became Avedon's muse, she said years later that "The only joy I ever got out of modeling was working with Dick Avedon." She became the so-called signature face of the Coco Chanel brand. Chanel herself became a close confidante, giving Parker advice on men and money as well as creating numerous Chanel outfits for her.

Parker was a model with the Walter Thornton agency. She was the first model to earn $200 per hour and $100,000 per year. Vogue declared her one of the faces of the confident, post-war American woman. By 1955, she owed income taxes on her modeling income from previous years, amounting to more than $60,000 in back taxes and rapidly accumulating penalties, an enormous amount at the time. Jerry Ford paid her tax bill and found her assignments. She worked also non-stop for Vogue, Revlon, Hertz, Westinghouse, Max Factor, Bliss, DuPont, Simplicity, Smirnoff, and Ronson shavers, to name a few. She also was on the covers of about 70 magazines around the world, including Vogue, Elle, Life, Look, Redbook, Paris Match and McCall's. After being introduced to, and taught photography by, war photographer Robert Capa, Parker was briefly listed as a member of Magnum Photos.

Her first film role was in Kiss Them for Me (1957), playing the main interest of Cary Grant's character. Soon after she accepted a cameo role in Funny Face (1957), on screen for two minutes in a musical number described as "Pink Number". Her other films include: Ten North Frederick (1958), The Best of Everything (1959), Circle of Deception (1960 - during which she met future husband Bradford Dillman), Flight from Ashiya (1964) and Chamber of Horrors (1966). She also played dramatic roles in TV shows such as Burke's Law and The Twilight Zone plus appearances as herself on a number of quiz shows such as I've Got a Secret.

Parker's last role was in a 1970 episode of Night Gallery. She did, in a way, make one other film "appearance" in The Beatles' 1970 documentary film Let It Be, in which the band performed their song "Suzy Parker". The song, one of the few credited as written by all four Beatles, was part of their Academy Award-winning score for the original songs they performed in the film.

== Relationships and children ==
Parker was married three times. In 1950, she and her high-school sweetheart, Ronald Staton (some sources cite Charles), drove to Georgia to secretly marry. Parker said that she married him in a bikini with a raincoat on top, adding, "He was very good-looking, and it [the marriage] was just a sheer disaster." The young couple drove back to Florida where she was still living with her parents who were upset because of her age and because Ronald was part Cherokee. They moved to Pennsylvania and rented a house near where Dorian, her sister, was living with her husband and children. Parker was already modeling in the United States and Europe while Ronald was attending the University of Pennsylvania as a freshman.

Parker met journalist Pierre de la Salle (Pitou, born July 12, 1925) at a Jacques Fath party outside of Paris. She and Dorian were modeling together and separately on this trip. She returned to the United States and asked Ronald for a divorce, but he would only agree to a quick divorce if Parker gave him a large monetary settlement, paid for plastic surgery on his nose and paid for his acting lessons. She agreed, and their divorce was finalized in Mexico in 1953. Ronald was killed years later in an automobile accident. Parker and Pierre continued to date for years despite Pierre's numerous infidelities. She also was paying for his high cost-of-living expenses. They married about 1957 or 1958, but the couple kept it a secret.

In 1958, Parker was a passenger in a car her father was driving when they were hit by an oncoming train. According to accident reports, neither of them heard or saw the train until it slammed into the car. Her father died of his injuries at the hospital. Parker was hospitalized, with broken bones and embedded glass, but with her face untouched, under the name Mrs. Pierre de la Salle. The press jumped on this, but Pierre continued to deny that they were married. Soon thereafter, a photo spread of the couple appeared in the August 19, 1958, Look magazine cover story about her. Parker began psychotherapy to cope with her rocky second marriage and the death of her beloved father.

After recovering from her injuries, Parker became pregnant and de la Salle left. She said, "He didn't want to be a father. I already hired a nanny... he was gone, history." She gave birth to their daughter Georgia Belle Florian Coco Chanel de la Salle in December 1959, whose godmother was close friend Coco Chanel. Parker named her daughter after her older sisters Georgiabell and Florian and purposely left Dorian’s name off. Dorian and Parker feuded for many years, as Parker was fed up with Dorian’s promiscuous lifestyle and her not taking care of her children. A March 14, 1977, People magazine article featured Parker trying to launch her then 17-year-old daughter Georgia as a model. However, Georgia modeled only a few times during and after college.

In 1960, Parker met actor Bradford Dillman on the set of their 1960 movie, A Circle of Deception. She was still married to de la Salle but no longer living with him. Dillman was ending his first marriage and dating Juliette Gréco at the time. Parker obtained a divorce and married Bradford in 1963 on board a boat at sea. She changed her name to Suzy Parker Dillman following the marriage.

After marrying Dillman in 1963, then receiving injuries in a car accident in 1964, Parker mostly retired from modeling and acted as a stepmother to Jeffrey and Pamela, Dillman's children from his first marriage. Parker enjoyed being a stay-at-home mother and, like her sister Dorian, who was a Cordon Bleu-level chef, Parker was an excellent cook.

Parker had three children with Dillman: daughter Dinah and sons Charlie and Christopher. The family lived in Bel Air, Los Angeles, until Dinah was bitten by a rattlesnake in the yard and almost died. They then moved to Montecito in the Santa Barbara area, where Suzy remained until her death in 2003.

== Later years and death ==
A self-described tomboy in her teens, Parker broke several bones as a result. Parker also broke bones in the 1958 car accident that killed her father. In 1964, she was nervously rehearsing for her famous appearance in the well-known The Twilight Zone episode "Number 12 Looks Just Like You" when she was in another car accident.

Parker long suffered from allergies, and in the 1990s, developed ulcers. During surgery for an ulcer, her vital signs disappeared on the operating table, but she was resuscitated. She never fully recovered and developed more ulcers and diabetes. She had multiple hip surgeries, and then her kidneys began to fail. She spent the last five years of her life in and out of the hospital.

Parker decided to end dialysis treatments. She returned home and died surrounded by family at her orchard in Montecito, California, on May 3, 2003. She was 70. Her husband Bradford Dillman died in 2018 at age 87.

== Filmography ==
| Year | Title | Role | Notes |
|---|---|---|---|
| 1957 | Producers' Showcase | | Episode: "Mayerling" (uncredited) |
| 1957 | Funny Face | Speciality Dancer ("The Pink Number") | Film debut (uncredited) |
| 1957 | Playhouse 90 | Tani Morena | Episode: "The Death of Manolete" |
| 1957 | Kiss Them for Me | Gwinneth Livingston | |
| 1958 | Ten North Frederick | Kate Drummond | |
| 1959 | The Best of Everything | Gregg Adams | |
| 1960 | Circle of Deception | Lucy Bowen | |
| 1962 | The Interns | Lisa Cardigan | |
| 1963 | Burke's Law | Angela Pattison; Bridget Jenkins | Episode: "Who Killed Alex Debbs?"; Episode: "Who Killed Holly Howard?" |
| 1964 | The Twilight Zone | Lana Cuberle/Grace/Doe/Jane | Episode: "Number 12 Looks Just Like You" |
| 1964 | Flight from Ashiya | Lucille Caroll | |
| 1964 | Dr. Kildare | Serena Norcross | Episode: "Maybe Love Will Save My Apartment House" |
| 1964 | The Rogues | Carol Conover | Episode: "Fringe Benefits" |
| 1965 | Vacation Playhouse | Sybil | Episode: "Sybil" |
| 1966 | Chamber of Horrors | Barbara Dixon | Final film appearance |
| 1967 | Tarzan | Laura Keller | Episode: "The Day of the Golden Lion" |
| 1967 | Bob Hope Presents the Chrysler Theatre | Doctor | Episode: "Free of Charge" |
| 1968 | It Takes a Thief | Melinda Brooke | Episode: "When Boy Meets Girl" |
| 1970 | Night Gallery | Carlotta Acton / Miss Wattle | Episode: "The Dead Man/The Housekeeper", (final appearance) |
