= Jet set =

Wealthy people who travel widely for pleasure

The jet set is a social group of wealthy and fashionable people who travel the world to participate in social activities unavailable to ordinary people. The term was introduced in the 1950s and replaced "café society"; it reflected a style of life involving travelling from one stylish or exotic place to another via jet plane. With greater accessibility of air travel it has been replaced at least in part by the term "glitterati", reflecting a greater emphasis upon celebrity, including "being seen" and stalked by paparazzi, and less upon mode of travel.

== Definition ==
Jet passenger service in the 1950s was initially marketed to the upper class, giving rise to the notion of a privileged group able to travel quickly and frequently between international destinations. Over time, however, the expansion of commercial aviation led to a broader democratization of air travel, rendering the term’s original, literal meaning—those who travel by jet—largely obsolete.

The term "jet set" is attributed to Igor Cassini, a reporter for the New York Journal-American who wrote a gossip column under the pen name "Cholly Knickerbocker". The younger brother of fashion designer Oleg Cassini, Cassini coined the phrase in the early 1950s as a modern counterpart to "café society", a term popularized by his predecessor Maury Paul. In 1962, Cassini explained:

I used "jet set" because it seemed appropriate in the age of the jet plane. I prefer it to cafe society because cafe society is outmoded. You can't say any longer that well-known society people go regularly to night clubs, because the usual night clubs are too dull for them. Jet-setters are people who fly away for weekends. They are the avant-garde, the pace-setters. The jet set is people who live fast, move fast, know the latest thing and do the unusual and the unorthodox. The jet set has no fixed rules and standards.

A related term that emerged during the 1960s was "beautiful people", a precursor to today’s "glitterati", referring to a milieu of celebrities, socialites, and cultural figures in which youth, style, and visibility often took precedence over traditional markers of status.

== History ==
The British international air carrier BOAC inaugurated the world's first commercial scheduled jet service on 2 May 1952, using the de Havilland Comet. After a series of accidents in 1953–1954, the Comet 4 was introduced in 1958. The first successful service, from October 1958, was the typical "jet set" route, London–New York City. Pan Am followed suit with the Boeing 707, making its first scheduled flight between New York City and Paris on 26 October 1958.

Other cities on the standard jet set routes were Honolulu, Mexico City, Las Vegas, Los Angeles, San Francisco, Washington, D.C., Rio de Janeiro, Athens, Madrid, Paris, Rome, Vienna, Bangkok, Hong Kong, Manila, Punta del Este and Tokyo. Jet set resorts in places like Acapulco and Nassau, where Huntington Hartford's new Paradise Island opened in 1962, were taking the place of Bermuda. Meanwhile, Cannes, Capri, St. Tropez, Portofino, and other sea-side towns on the French and Italian Riviera were on the jet set itinerary. Greek Islands such as Mykonos were included in the loop around 1974. Later on other hot spots such as Spain's Marbella on its Costa del Sol also developed a similar reputation.

The original members of this elite, free-wheeling set were those socialites who were not shy about publicity and entertained in semi-public places like restaurants and in night clubs, where paparazzi—a jet set phenomenon—photographed them. They were the first generation that might spend a weekend in Paris or fly to Rome just for a party. The jet set was celebrated in popular culture, for example, Federico Fellini captured their lifestyle in La Dolce Vita (1960), and many movies and record albums of the era promoted flying to foreign lands for honeymoons and getaways, such as Capitol Records Honeymoon in Rome (1956).

The term was joined in the spring of 1962 by Vogue's coinage of the term the "Beautiful People". This expression initially referred to the circle that formed around President John F. Kennedy and First Lady Jacqueline Kennedy. Readers of the 15 February 1964 Vogue could learn "What the beautiful people are doing to keep fit." The two phrases ran for a time in tandem; in 1970, author and social commentator Cleveland Amory could fear "that the Beautiful People and the Jet Set are being threatened by current economics."

By the 1970s, the jet set had evolved into a broader cultural phenomenon encompassing a network of globally recognized figures across fashion, art, film, and music. Prominent figures associated with the jet set included socialites and musicians such as Bianca Jagger and Mick Jagger, artists such as Andy Warhol, film stars including Helmut Berger and Liza Minnelli, fashion designers such as Yves Saint Laurent and Halston, and models including Marisa Berenson and Jerry Hall. Their lifestyle was defined by international fame, wealth, and beauty, as well as frequent travel and regular appearances at exclusive venues such as Regine's and Studio 54. Their style further defined the phenomenon, with members commonly associated with leading fashion houses and designers of the era, including Yves Saint Laurent, Halston, Gucci, Fiorucci, and Zandra Rhodes.

In 1976, the jet set first flew on the supersonic Concorde. Scheduled flights began on 21 January 1976 on the London–Bahrain oil executive route and the distinctly jet-set Paris–Rio de Janeiro (via Dakar) route. From November 1977 the Concorde was flying between standard jet-set destinations, London or Paris to New York City; passenger lists on initial flights were gossip-column material. The Concorde restored the term's cachet: "From rock stars to royalty, the Concorde was the way to travel for the jet set," according to the Nova retrospective special "Supersonic Dream". However, the Concorde was doomed by its sonic boom, limited global fly-over rights because of the boom, and its huge thirst for jet fuel. After a disastrous crash in 2000, the aircraft was retired in 2003. Meanwhile, the Boeing 747, densely packed with some 400 passengers, was a craft that accelerated the democratizing social changes already brought about by the jet age.

== In pop culture ==
A sign that "jet set" had passed from urbane use was the 1974 country song "(We're Not) The Jet Set", in which George Jones and Tammy Wynette claim they are "the old Chevrolet set", as opposed to leading a glamorous, "jet-setting" lifestyle. The 1975 romantic drama movie Once Is Not Enough, and the 1986 teen romance drama Fire With Fire, were two movies examples of this, the latter had the girl lead's (Virginia Madsen's) off screen parents as this, leaving her care to the nuns at the convent school Madsen's character was sent to by them with plans to enroll her in a Swiss finishing school after her convent school graduation, further depriving her of needed family bonding and normal teenage activities.

== See also ==
- Celebrity culture
- Commercial aviation
- Elite
- High society
- International Debutante Ball
- Lifestyles of the Rich and Famous
- Pan Am (TV series)
- Playboy lifestyle
- Setjetting
