= List of ambassadors of Spain to Russia =

Ambassador of Spain to Russia
- Coat of arms of Spain
- Incumbent; Ricardo Martínez Vázquez since 3 July 2024
- Ministry of Foreign Affairs; Secretariat of State for Foreign Affairs
- Style: The Most Excellent
- Residence: Moscow
- Nominator: The Foreign Minister
- Appointer: The Monarch
- Term length: At the government's pleasure
- Inaugural holder: James Fitz-James Stuart, 2nd Duke of Berwick
- Formation: 1727
- Website: Mission of Spain to Russia

The ambassador of Spain to Russia is the official representative of the Kingdom of Spain to the Russian Federation. It is also accredited to the Republic of Armenia, the Republic of Turkmenistan and the Republic of Uzbekistan. Although he has not been accredited to Belarus since 2021, the ambassador is also in charge of consular affairs in this country.

During the reign of Charles I (V of the Holy Roman Empire), he sent envoys to the Muscovy court and the Russian ruler sent envoys to the court in Madrid, but they were appointed to deal with affairs related the Holy Roman Empire. The first real contacts between Spain and the Tsardom of Russia (later Russian Empire) were established in the early-18th-century, during the reigns of Philip V and Peter the Great. These two rulers exchanged diplomatic representatives and, in 1727, Spain appointed the first ambassador, the Duke of Berwick.

However, in the following years, with few exceptions, no new ambassadors were sent, but rather diplomats with the rank of minister or chargé d'affaires, until the reign of Alfonso XII, when the diplomatic representation was once again elevated to the category of embassy. Interrupted after the murder of the Romanov family, they were briefly re-established in 1936, but they were severed again during the dictatorship of Francisco Franco. Later, in 1973 the dictatorship established a commercial office in Moscow and diplomatic links were finally re-established on 9 February 1977.

== Jurisdiction ==
- Russia: The Embassy of Spain in Moscow manages Russia–Spain relations and it has two consulates general for the protection of Spaniards, one in Moscow and another in Saint Petersburg.

The ambassador is also accredited to:

- Armenia: Since the establishment of relations on 27 January 1992, the ambassador to Russia has been accredited to the Armenia authorities. Since 2022, there is also a chargé d'affaires in Yerevan. Consular protection is provided through the Consulate General in Moscow.
- Belarus: Both nations established diplomatic relations on 13 February 1992. The ambassador of Russia to Belarus was accredited to this country until 2021. The Consulate General of Spain in Moscow is responsible for consular protection in Belarus and Spain has an honorary consulate in Minsk.
- Turkmenistan: Diplomatic relations established on 19 March 1992 and consular affairs are managed by the Consulate in Moscow.
- Uzbekistan: Spain recognized its independence on 31 December 1991 and established diplomatic relations on 18 March 1992. Since 2022, Spain has a Diplomatic Office in Tashkent and it also has an Economic and Trade Office.

In the past, this position served as ambassador to the Soviet Union (1936–1939 and 1977–1991), and also to Azerbaijan (1992–1998), Georgia (1992–2007), Kazakhstan (1992–1999), Kyrgyzstan (1992–1999), Moldova (1993–1998), Mongolia (1977–1995) and Tajikistan (1992–1999).

== List of ambassadors ==
This list was compiled using the work "History of the Spanish Diplomacy" by the Spanish historian and diplomat Miguel Ángel Ochoa Brun. The work covers up to the year 2000, so the rest is based on appointments published in the Boletín Oficial del Estado.

Name	Rank	Term
Bartolomé	Envoy	1523
Antonio de Conti	Envoy	1523
Sigismund von Herberstein	Co-envoys	1526
Leonardo de Nogarolo	Co-envoys	1526
Cornelio Schepper	Envoy	1528
Allegretto Allegretti	Envoy	1645
Patricio Lawless	Envoy	1718–1719
Padre Francisco Arcelli	Minister	1722
The Duke of Berwick	Ambassador	1727–1730
Juan Cascos de Villa de Moros	Chargé d'affaires	1730–1734
Jacinto Ferrero Fieschi y de Saboya; Count of Bena	Minister	1740–1741
Ignacio Poyano	Chargé d'affaires	1760–1762
The Duke of Almodóvar del Río	Minister	1761–1763
The Marquess of Santa Cruz de Marcenado	Minister	1763–1771
José del Río y Campa	Chargé d'affaires	1768–1770
Manuel Delitala y Timboni	Chargé d'affaires	1771–1776
The Count of Lacy	Minister	1772–1780
Pedro Normande y Merican	Chargé d'affaires	1776–1781
The Marquess de la Torre	Minister	1781–1783
The Duke of Santa Fe	Chargé d'affaires	1783–1784
Pedro Normande y Merican	Minister	1784–1789
Pedro Macanaz	Chargé d'affaires	1787–1788
Miguel de Gálvez y Gallardo	Minister	1788–1792
Felipe d'Amat i Cortada	Minister	1792–1793
José de Onís	Minister	1792–1798
Blas de Mendizábal y Ayesterán	Diplomatic agent	1797–1799
Break in diplomatic relations (1799–1801)
Gaspar María de Nava y Álvarez, Conde de Noroña	Minister	1802–1808
Joaquín de Anduaga	Chargé d'affaires	1808
Benito Pardo de Figueroa (Note: Since 1809 representing the government of Joseph Bonaparte.)	Minister	1807–1812
Antonio Colombí y Payet	Chargé d'affaires	1809–1811
Francisco Cea Bermúdez	Envoy	1811–1812
Francisco Cea Bermúdez	Chargé d'affaires	1812–1816
Ignacio Pérez de Lema y Soto	Chargé d'affaires	1814–1816
Francisco Cea Bermúdez	Ambassador	1816–1821
Luis de Noeli	Chargé d'affaires	1820
Pedro Alcántara de Argaiz	Chargé d'affaires	1821–1822
Juan Miguel Páez de la Cadena	Chargé d'affaires	1824–1834
The Duke of San Carlos	Extraordinary Ambassador	1826
Break in diplomatic relations (1834–1856)
Antonio Remón Zarco del Valle y Huet	Minister	1848
The Duke of Osuna	Minister	1856–1860
The Duke of Osuna	Ambassador	1860–1868
Emilio de Muruaga y Vildósola	Chargé d'affaires	1869–1872
Emilio de Muruaga y Vildósola	Minister	1872–1874
The Marquess of Bedmar	Ambassador	1875–1877
Juan Ximénez de Sandoval y Saavedra; Marquess of the Rivera	Ambassador	1877–1881
José María Bernaldo de Quirós; Marquess of Campo Sagrado	Minister	1881–1892
Mariano Miguel Maldonado y Dávalos; Count of Villagonzalo	Minister	1892–1896
Mariano Miguel Maldonado y Dávalos; Count of Villagonzalo	Ambassador	1896–1899
Narciso García-Loygorri y Rizo; Duke of Vistahermosa	Ambassador	1899–1904
The Duke of Arcos	Ambassador	1904–1905
The Marquess of Ayerbe	Ambassador	1905–1907
The Count of la Viñaza	Ambassador	1907–1913
Infante Ferdinand of Bavaria and Bourbon	Extraordinary Ambassador (Note: To present the uniform and insignia of honorary colonel of the Farnesio Lancers Regiment to Nicholas II.)	1908
The Marquess de la Puerta	Ambassador	1915–1916
The Marquess of Villasinda	Ambassador	1916–1917
Francisco Gutiérrez de Agüera y Bayo	Ambassador	1917–1919
Diplomatic relations interrupted (1919–1936)
Marcelino Pascua	Ambassador	1936–1938
Manuel Martínez Pedroso	Chargé d'affaires	1938–1939
Break in diplomatic relations (1939–1977)
Eduardo Ibáñez y García de Velasco	Head of Commercial Delegation	1973–1976
Rafael Ferrer Sagreras	Head of Commercial Delegation	1976–1977
The Marquess of Samaranch (Note: Accredited to Mongolia.)	Ambassador	1977–1981
The Marquess of Campo Real	Ambassador	1981–1983
José Luis Xifra de Ocerin	Ambassador	1983–1987
José Cuenca Anaya	Ambassador	1987–1992
Eugenio Bregolat (Note: Accredited to Armenia, Azerbaijan, Belarus, Kazakhstan, Kyrgyzstan, Turkmenistan, Moldova, Mongolia, Tajikistan and Uzbekistan.)	Ambassador	1992–1996
José Antonio de Yturriaga (Note: Accredited to Armenia, Azerbaijan, Belarus, Kazakhstan, Kyrgyzstan, Turkmenistan, Moldova, Tajikistan and Uzbekistan.)	Ambassador	1996–1999
José Luis Crespo de Vega (Note: Accredited to Armenia, Belarus, Turkmenistan and Uzbekistan.)	Ambassador	1999–2001
José María Robles Fraga	Ambassador	2001–2004
The Marquess of Nerva	Ambassador	2004–2007
Juan Antonio March Pujol	Ambassador	2007–2011
Luis Felipe Fernández de la Peña	Ambassador	2011–2012
José Ignacio Carbajal Gárate	Ambassador	2012–2016
Ignacio Ybáñez Rubio	Ambassador	2017–2018
Fernando Valderrama Pareja	Ambassador	2018–2021
Marcos Gómez Martínez (Note: Accredited to Armenia, Turkmenistan and Uzbekistan.)	Ambassador	2021–2024
Ricardo Martínez Vázquez	Ambassador	2024–pres.

== See also ==
- Russia–Spain relations
- Armenia–Spain relations
- Belarus–Spain relations
- Spain–Uzbekistan relations
