= Cholly Knickerbocker =

Pen name for society columnists, 1891–1965

Cholly Knickerbocker is a pseudonym used by a series of society columnists writing for papers including the New York American and its successor, the New York Journal-American.

The name came from the perceived New York upper-crust pronunciation of "Charlie", and the pseudonym of Washington Irving "Diedrich Knickerbocker".

== Users of Cholly Knickerbocker ==
- John W. Keller, New York Recorder, 1891–1896
- Keller, New York American, 1896–?
- Several others, New York American, ?–1919
- Maury Henry Biddle Paul, 1919–1942
  - New York American, 1919–1937
  - New York Journal-American, 1937–1942
- Igor Cassini (with Liz Smith) – New York Journal-American, c. 1945–1963
- Charles A. Van Rensselaer, III – New York Journal-American, 1963–1965
- "Cholly Knickerbocker" is referenced in the Paramount Pictures film Sabrina (1954)
- The name appears in the Cole Porter song "High Society", which opens 1956 film of the same name, sung by Louis Armstrong.

== Users of Suzy Knickerbocker ==
- Aileen Mehle, New York Journal-American, 1963-1966
