= Leon Gaikis =

Soviet diplomat (1898–1937)

- Леонид Яковлевич Гайкис
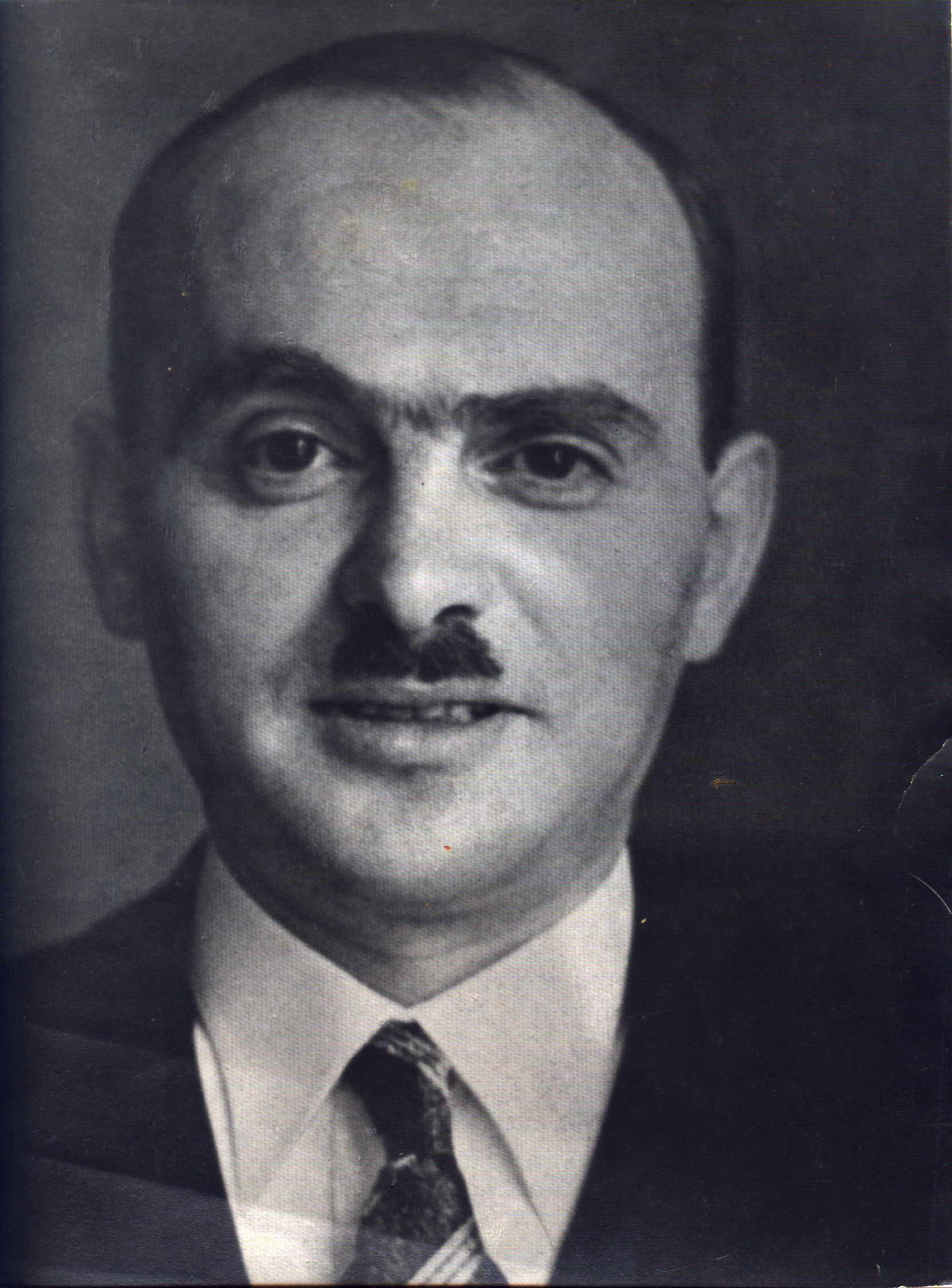
- Born: 1898; Warsaw, Congress Poland, Russian Empire
- Died: 21 August 1937 (aged 38–39); Moscow, Soviet Union
- Citizenship: Russian, Soviet
- Occupation: Diplomat
- Title: Soviet ambassador to Spain
- Term: 1937
- Predecessor: Marcel Rosenberg
- Successor: Sergey Aleksandrovich Bogomolov (1977)
- Political party: Communist Party of the Soviet Union
- Spouse: Helena Gaikis

Leonid Yakovlevich Gaikis (Gaykis, Hajkis, Jaikis, Khaikis; 1898 — 21 August 1937) was a Soviet diplomat and the second Soviet ambassador to Spain, where he served during the Spanish Civil War. In May 1937, he was recalled to Moscow, arrested and soon shot as part of the Great Purge.

== Early life ==
Born in 1898 in Warsaw, then controlled by the Russian Empire, to a Jewish middle-class family under the birth name Leon Haykis (since in Russian language the consonant H is replaced by G or Kh, he later became known as Gaikis or Khaikis). His childhood was influenced by the major events in society, against the background of the Polish Revolution of 1905.

He was a student at the Faculty of Philosophy at the University of Warsaw, though he didn't finish his studies there. He became a sympathizer of the 'Polish Socialist Party – Left' (PPS-L) before 1914, and worked as a teacher at the folk school in the years 1914—1915. It was then, during World War I, that Poland fell to a military occupation by the Central Powers.

In 1917, the year of the Russian Revolution, he became a member of 'Social Democracy of the Kingdom of Poland and Lithuania' (SDKPiL) — a political party whose most known member earlier was Rosa Luxemburg, who by then already fled to Germany. The party merged with PPS-L the following year to become the Communist Workers' Party of Poland (KPRP). He was arrested in Warsaw in 1918 for communist agitation. The party did not support the formation of the Second Polish Republic (led by the right-wing nationalist Piłsudski) in November 1918, and supported the Bolsheviks in the then emerging Polish–Soviet War.

With these events unfolding, in 1919, aged 21, Gaikis joined the Red Army. He served in its 11th Army in the Russian Civil War. After 1919, he served as an officer of the Kazakh Military Revolutionary Committee (Kazrevkom). From February 1920, he served as a representative of Kazrevkom in the management department of the Orenburg Governorate Executive Committee "for the organization of rear militia". From May 1920, he was one of the leaders of the “Special Commission for Survey and Organization of the Soviets in Turgai and Irgiz Counties”. In August—October 1920, was the business manager and technical secretary of Kazrevkom.

== Soviet diplomatic career ==
=== Early years ===
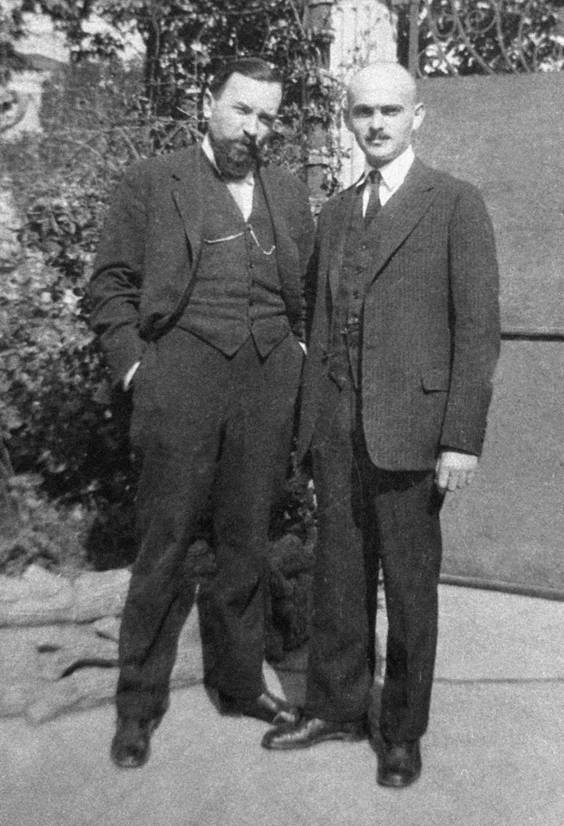
The first ambassador of the Soviet Union to Mexico, Stanislav Pestkovsky (1924-1926), together with the trade representative of the Soviet Union, Leonid Gaikis. Circa 1925

- 1921: Went to work for the People's Commissariat of Foreign Affairs (NKID of the RSFSR); Secretary of the Russian-Ukrainian-Belarusian delegation to the Mixed Border Soviet-Polish Commission.
- 1922—1923: Worked in the central office of the NKID.
- 1923—1924: Secretary of the USSR Commissar for Foreign Affairs Georgy Chicherin.

=== Mexico ===
In the years 1924—1928, Gaikis served as first Secretary in the embassy of the Soviet Union in Mexico. His term began at the time of the first Soviet ambassador to Mexico, Stanislav Pestkovsky, who served in the office until 1926 and would later be among those who perished in Stalin's Great Purge of 1937.

In 1925, Gaikis met with Vladimir Mayakovsky on the latter's arrival to Mexico, and helped the poet obtain a visa to the United States.

During the term of Alexandra Kollontai as ambassador, 1926—1927, Gaikis was responsible for trade affairs. On 4 January 1927, Kollontai wrote in her diplomatic diary: "I wonder how I can work when I only have two senior staff members: Gaikis and myself. There are three more employees besides us. We even have no real guard. [...] And we have no diplomatic couriers. We send our business letters by sea or via New York, as ordinary mail in both cases. A strange system. We do our own ciphering. We are terribly isolated. It is awful and sad".

=== Later years ===
- 1929—1933: Worked in the Profintern system.
- 1933—1935: Again in the central office of the NKID of the Soviet Union.
- 1935—1936: Consul General in Istanbul.

== Spain and the Great Purge ==
The Soviet Union established diplomatic relations with the Second Spanish Republic in 1933, but the ambassadors were not exchanged until after the coup d’état by the army in July 1936 due to the victory of the right wing CEDA coalition in the November 1933 elections. A long-standing Bolshevik, Anatoly Lunacharsky, was appointed as the ambassador to Spain but died en route. Eventually, Marcel Rosenberg was appointed as the first ambassador in 1936. Leon Gaikis was sent along to serve as an adviser to the ambassador. They arrived in Madrid on 27 August 1936, after the Spanish Civil War already started.

The diplomatic heavy handed was of Rosenberg testified to by Luis Araquistain and Gines Ganga, among others, led to Rosenberg being recalled to Moscow, shortly after a February 1937 meeting between Stalin and the Spanish ambassador to Moscow, Marcelino Pascua, in which the former said "as for Rosenberg, we'll recall him and send down someone less enfant terrible. Someone more 'official'". On 19 February 1937, Gaikis was appointed to replace Rosenberg, who soon vanished during the Great Purge.

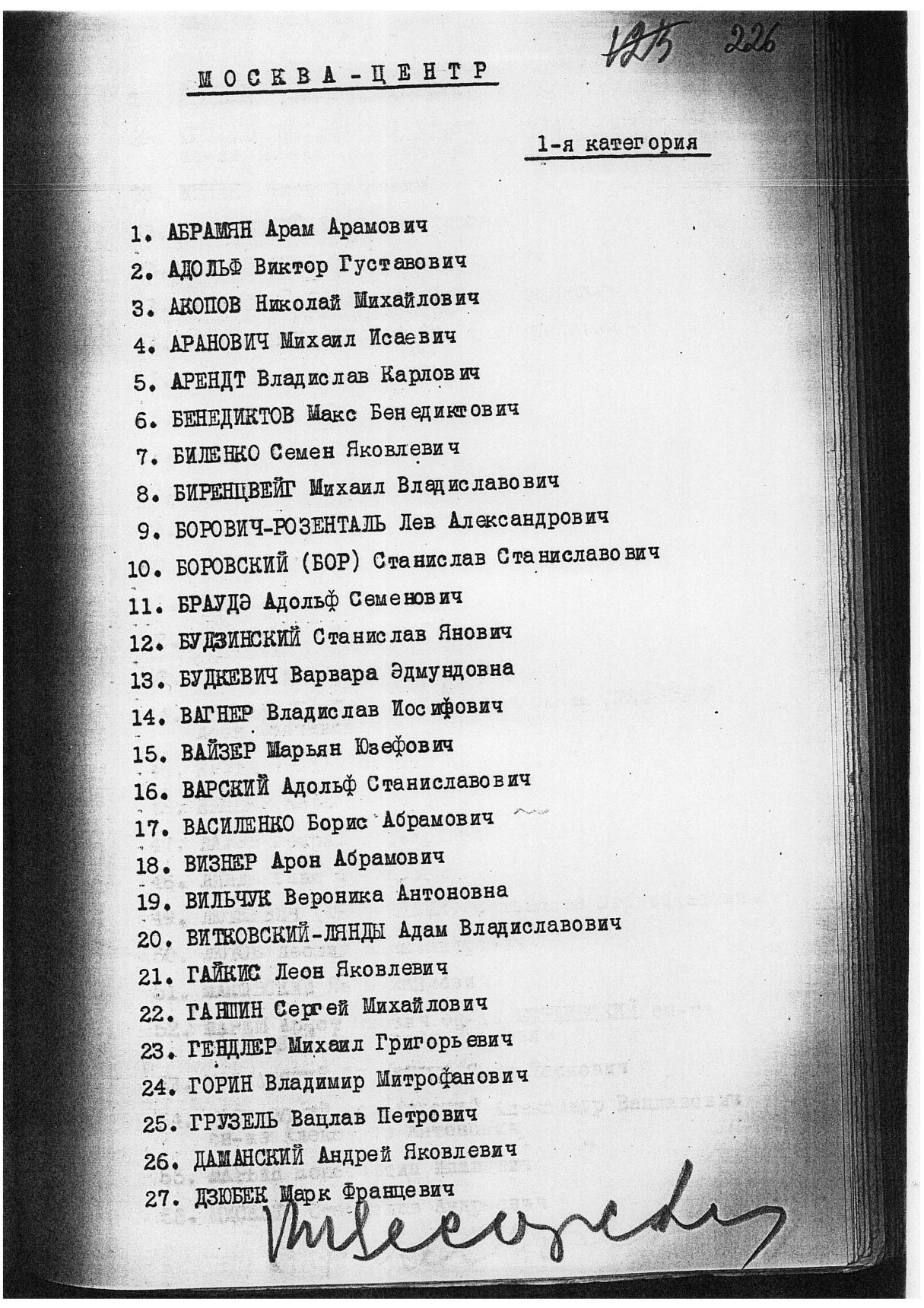
Gaikis appearing as #21 on one of Stalin's execution lists, Moscow, 20 August 1937. The page is signed by the senior NKVD official Vladimir Tsesarsky.

Gaikis himself soon fell victim to the purges. In June 1937, he was recalled to Moscow. He thought that would be a routine matter but was brutally beaten and arrested by the NKVD on arrival on 16 June, and was removed from office the next day. Having allegedly supported back in 1923, during Lenin's terminal illness, The Declaration of 46, which called for greater party democracy and preceded the formation of the Trotsky-led Left Opposition, Gaikis was now starved, tortured, interrogated and prosecuted, like many others, under the charge of Trotskyism. He was named in one of Stalin's execution lists, titled "Moscow-Center and Moscow Region", 20 August 1937 (#21 in the list), ordering his execution through the "Album procedure". The order was formally affirmed by the Military College of the Supreme Court of the Soviet Union, which sentenced him to death "for betrayal of the Fatherland and belonging to a counter-revolutionary terrorist organization". He was shot on the same day, 21 August 1937, at the age of 39. He was cremated in the Donskoye Cemetery's crematorium in Moscow.

After the purge of Rosenberg and Gaikis, no official ambassador was appointed again, and the embassy was headed by the chargé d'affaires, Sergey Marchenko, until the defeat of the Spanish Republic with the fascist victory of Franco's forces in 1939, which saw the break of all diplomatic relations. It was only in 1977, following the death of Franco, that diplomatic relations were re-established and a new ambassador was appointed. The chargé d'affaires, Sergey Marchenko, was arrested after returning to Russia in 1939, on charges of participation in a counter-revolutionary terrorist organization, and was executed in July 1941. Vladimir Antonov-Ovseenko, the Soviet Consul General in Barcelona, a former Left Opposition member, was recalled to Moscow in August 1937 and within months was arrested and shot. The Soviet trade representative in Spain, Artur Stashevsky, was executed as well, on the same day as Gaikis.

Leon's wife, Helena, who stayed behind in Spain with their two little daughters, went later to Russia to find out what happened. She was immediately expelled from the Communist Party of the Soviet Union and in 1941 was arrested by a law that held responsible the closest relatives of incriminated people. She was sentenced to 10 years and sent to Siberia. In 1945, at the end of the Second World War, she was released as part of a deal acquired by the Union of Polish Patriots and was sent to the wrecked Warsaw.

After the death of Stalin, as part of the so-called de-Stalinization, Leon Gaikis was posthumously rehabilitated, on 17 December 1955, by the Military College of the Supreme Court of the Soviet Union.

== See also ==
- Foreign relations of the Soviet Union
