= Arthur Cassini =

Russian noble and diplomat (1835–1919)

Count Arthur Cassini
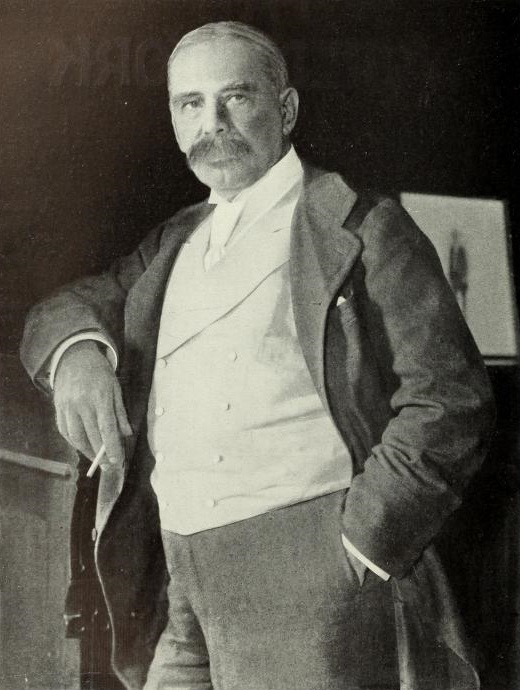
- Portrait, 1903

Russian Ambassador to China
- In office 17 November 1891 – 3 October 1896
- Succeeded by: Alexander Pavlov

Russian Ambassador to the United States
- In office 1898–1905
- Preceded by: Ernest Kotzebue
- Succeeded by: Roman Rosen

Russian Ambassador to Spain
- In office 1905–1909

Personal details
- Born: Arthur Paul Nicholas Cassini; 27 November 1835 Trieste, Austrian Empire
- Died: 19 October 1919 (aged 83) Paris, France
- Spouses: Yulia Nirotmortseva (m. 1862, divorced); Zoya Dmitrievna Bibikova (died 1906)
- Children: 1
- Occupation: Diplomat

Artur Pavlovich Cassini, Marquess of Capizucchi di Bologna and Count Cassini (Russian: Артур Павлович Кассини; 27 November 1835 – 19 October 1919), (Note: Cassini was falsely reported dead in American newspapers in May 1913.) known as Arthur Cassini, was a Russian aristocrat and lifelong diplomat who served the Russian Empire for 55 years during the 19th and early 20th centuries. During his tenure, he served most prominently as ambassador to China during the Triple Intervention and the negotiations over the lease of Port Arthur; as ambassador to the United States for seven tumultuous years that saw the Spanish–American and Russo-Japanese wars; and as ambassador to Spain during the Algeciras Conference.

== Early life ==
Cassini was born in Trieste, Austrian Empire (now Italy) in 1835 into a noble Russian family of Western European lineage. His paternal grandfather, Viktor Cassini, first entered the service of the tsar in 1790 and distinguished himself during the Napoleonic Wars. His father, Pavel Viktorovich Cassini, had served as Russian Consul at Trieste and as a State Counsellor to Venice. His Venetian mother, Elizabeth Maria Loy, was the granddaughter of Philipp Pittoni von Dannenfeld.

Although his surname Cassini and aristocratic title Marchese [Marquess] di Capizucchi (of Bologna) suggest an Italian citizenship, his family has been in fact Russian for a long time. By imperial decree of 14 October 1892, Arthur, his brother Michael, and their off-spring were entitled to use the noble title of Count (Count Cassini).

Having graduated from the prestigious Imperial Alexander Lyceum in 1854, Cassini entered into Government service on 18 December 1854, by joining the Foreign Office in St. Petersburg at age 18. In 1862 he was granted the title "gentleman of the bedchamber", in 1880—that of "Chamberlain", and on 1 April 1881 he was promoted to "State Councillor".

Cassini married his first wife, Yulia Nirotmortseva, in 1862. This marriage produced one daughter, Maria. After they divorced, he was married to Zoya Dmitrievna Bibikova, until her death in 1906. They had one daughter, Margarita. He was grandfather of Igor Cassini, Russian-American journalist, and Oleg Cassini, fashion designer.

== Diplomatic career ==
=== Early career ===
In 1854, Cassini became a diplomat in the Ministry of Foreign Affairs. In 1864, he was attached to the Dresden mission, and soon afterward, he was promoted to the office of the first secretary of the legation. He held the same position subsequently at the Russian missions in Baden, Copenhagen, and Hamburg.

By 25 September 1884, he was the chargé d'affaires, and on 10 May 1888, resident minister at Hamburg. After 10 years at Dresden, on 17 November 1891, Emperor Alexander III appointed him to the key post of envoy extraordinary and minister plenipotentiary to the Chinese imperial court in Beijing.

=== China ===
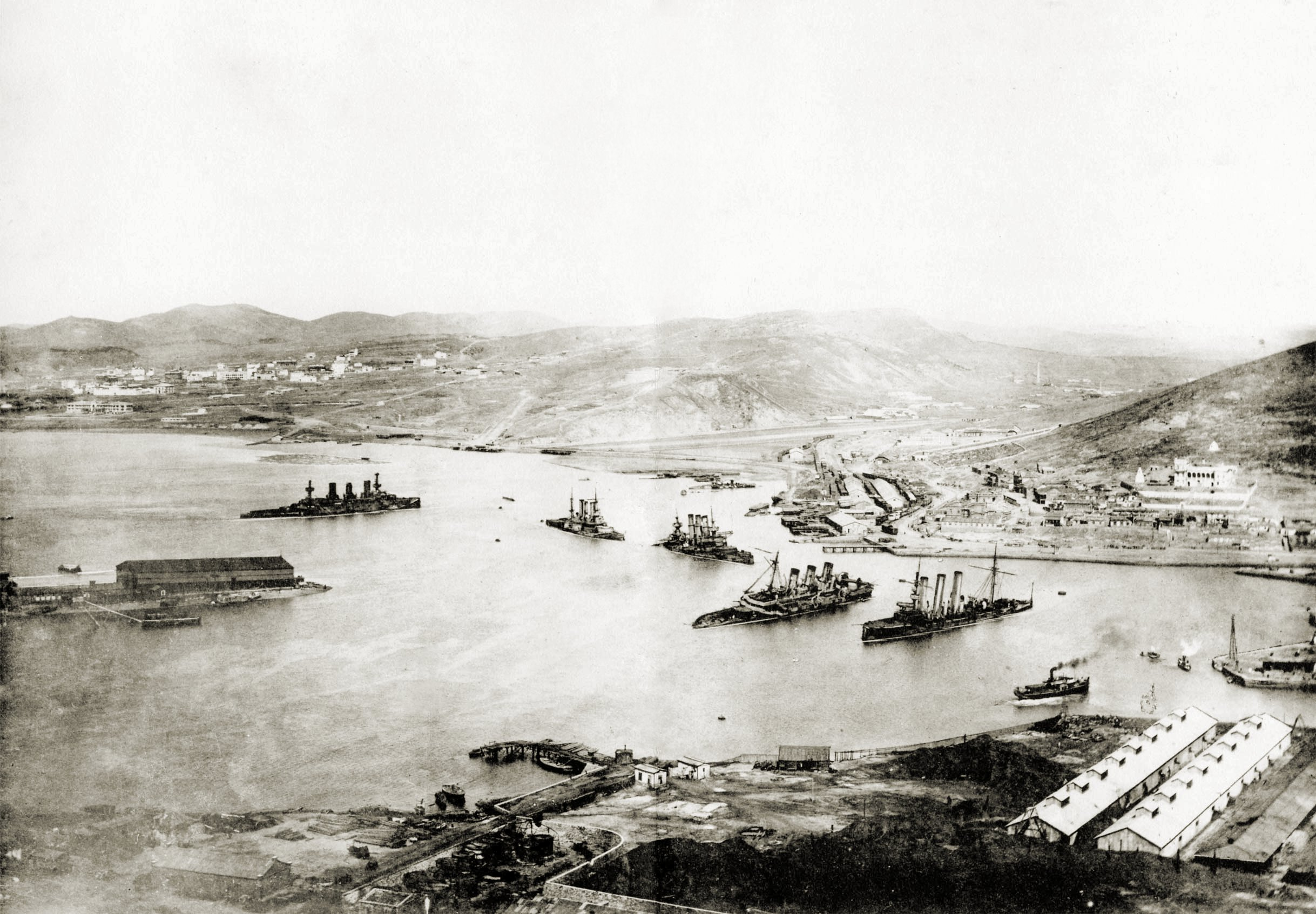
Port Arthur, which Cassini was instrumental in obtaining key rights over for Russia

Cassini's time in China was marked by great power competition as each tried to advance and protect their commercial interests in the Middle Kingdom, and Russia—then constructing the Trans-Siberian Railroad and seeking a warm-water port in the Far East. Upon his arrival in Beijing, Cassini refused to present his credentials to anyone other than the Emperor himself. Although the Chinese Foreign Office tried to assuage him from that position, he was granted an audience.

Having set out the tone of his mission, when the Sino-Japanese war ended, he led the way for the group of European powers that compelled Japan to withdraw her demands for territory amongst her war gains, in what became known as the Triple Intervention. Immediately after, and against the efforts of the British Government he was instrumental in arranging for the acquisition for Russia of long term concession of Port Arthur and Talien Bay on the Liaotung peninsula, as well as rights to link these by railroad to Russian lines. Recognizing the strategic importance of his role, Cassini is said to have told his niece and adoptive daughter Marguerite: "To possess the East, Russia must possess the Liaotung peninsula."

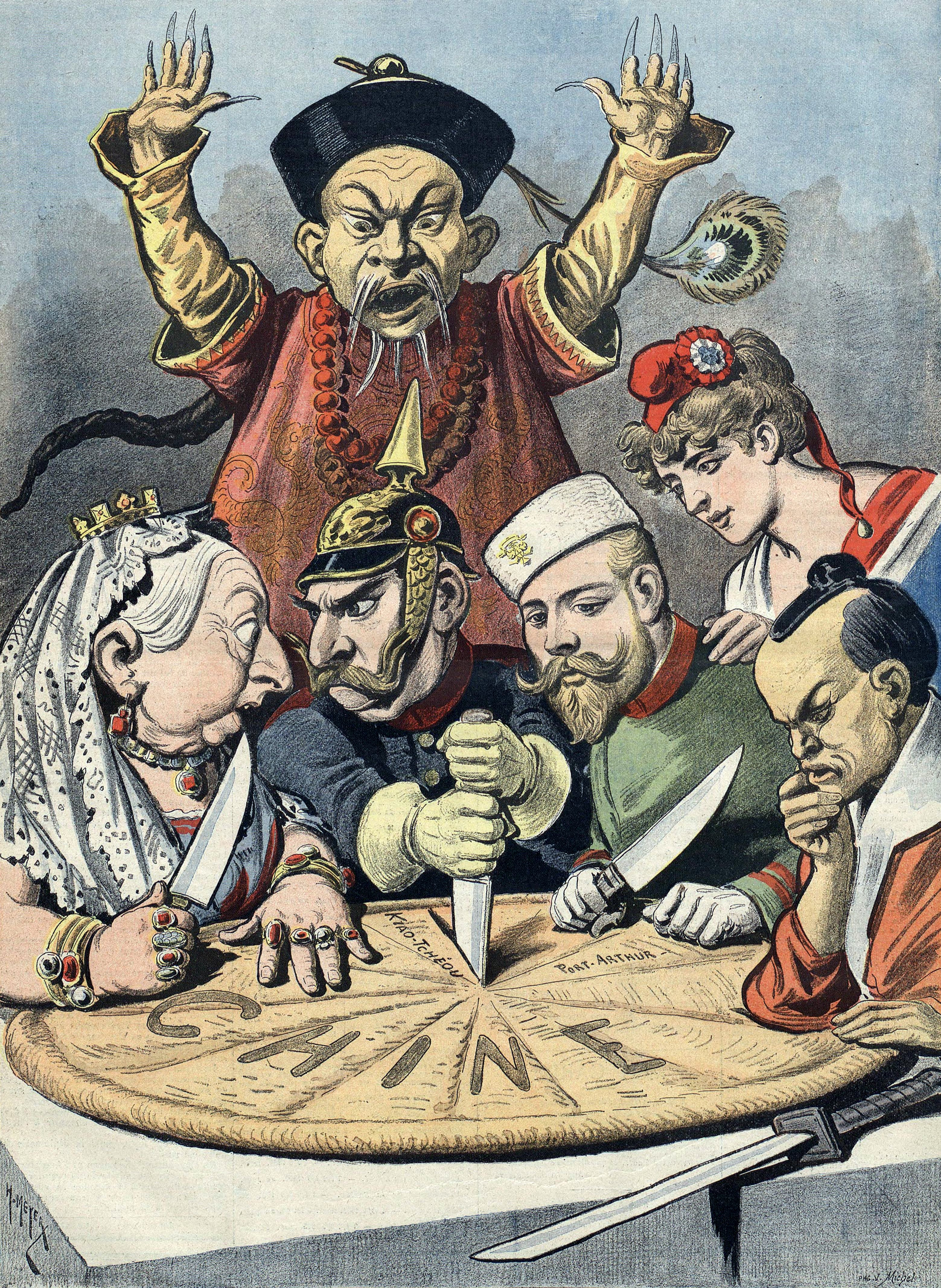
A shocked mandarin in Manchu robe in the back, with Queen Victoria (United Kingdom), Kaiser Wilhelm II (Germany), Tsar Nicholas II (Russia), Marianne (France), and a samurai (Japan) stabbing into a king cake with Chine ("China" in French) written on it.

Upon the announcement of his dispatch to Washington, the St. Petersburg Novoye Vremya, offered the following appraisal of the Count's tenure in China:

Our constant and watchful rival in the far East, England, was at the time still at the very height of her political supremacy in that quarter, and she used her predominance to secure every advantage and create for our Government new difficulties. At the same time our diplomacy had already outlined those broad historical questions which it was necessary for us to solve in connection with our plans in Asia and the construction of the Siberian line. The credit of thoroughly preparing the ground in China for the recent and current events unquestionably belongs to Count Cassini. Having studied the Chinese character and followed the policy and needs of the Chinese Government—taking advantage, moreover, of every failure and blunder of English diplomacy in that sphere—the count, in his six-year term at Peking, succeeded in displacing England step by step and entirely removing her from her position of vantage.

Most striking is this state of affairs show in the Anglo Chinese press, which has almost continuously betrayed irritation and intense dislike of Russia's representative at Peking and attributed to him and his Government all sorts of aggressive designs.

=== United States ===
Cassini remained ambassador to China until 3 October 1896, and having gained the reputation of an astute, resourceful, and brilliant diplomat, he was appointed ambassador to the United States in early 1898, shortly after the outbreak of the Spanish–American War. Cassini's tenure in Washington D.C. saw a great deal of activity on behalf of his government as a result of the number of incidents which occurred during his posting—including the Kishinev incident, Russian occupation of Manchuria, and the Russo-Japanese War.

At the outset of his time in Washington, Cassini allegedly saw some coolness to his government in official circles in the United States as a result of his government's perceived position with respect to Spain. Cassini advised the emperor that an impartial course between the combatants would be the best one for his government, and that advice was followed. While that was the case, Cassini's task was not an easy one in light of the fact that Russian actions and interests often conflicted, directly or indirectly, with those of the United States, especially during the Roosevelt administration, with the result that Cassini was not popular with, or trusted by, the president, and went to great lengths to defend his government's actions with both the administration and press. Indeed, Cassini's mendacity on occasion resulted in direct friction with the White House. He was seen as being too much of an old school diplomat, and although his adroitness worked well in Beijing, the American Press reported that this was too much the diplomacy of previous generations and as a result, Cassini "as such was unable to secure the confidence of either the people or the government of the United States".

While that was the case, Cassini's service at Washington was not short lived and he rose to be dean of the diplomatic corps there as a result of his length of service. As a result, he headed the line of ambassadors accredited to the United States, and headed the diplomatic corps at occasions such as the second inauguration of President Theodore Roosevelt. Cassini's niece and adopted daughter, Marguerite, indeed, was close friends with President Roosevelt's eldest child, Alice, during much of Cassini's time in Washington. After reaching 50 years of service, in 1905, Cassini received an autographed letter from Emperor Nicholas II of Russia and was awarded the Order of Saint Alexander Nevsky.

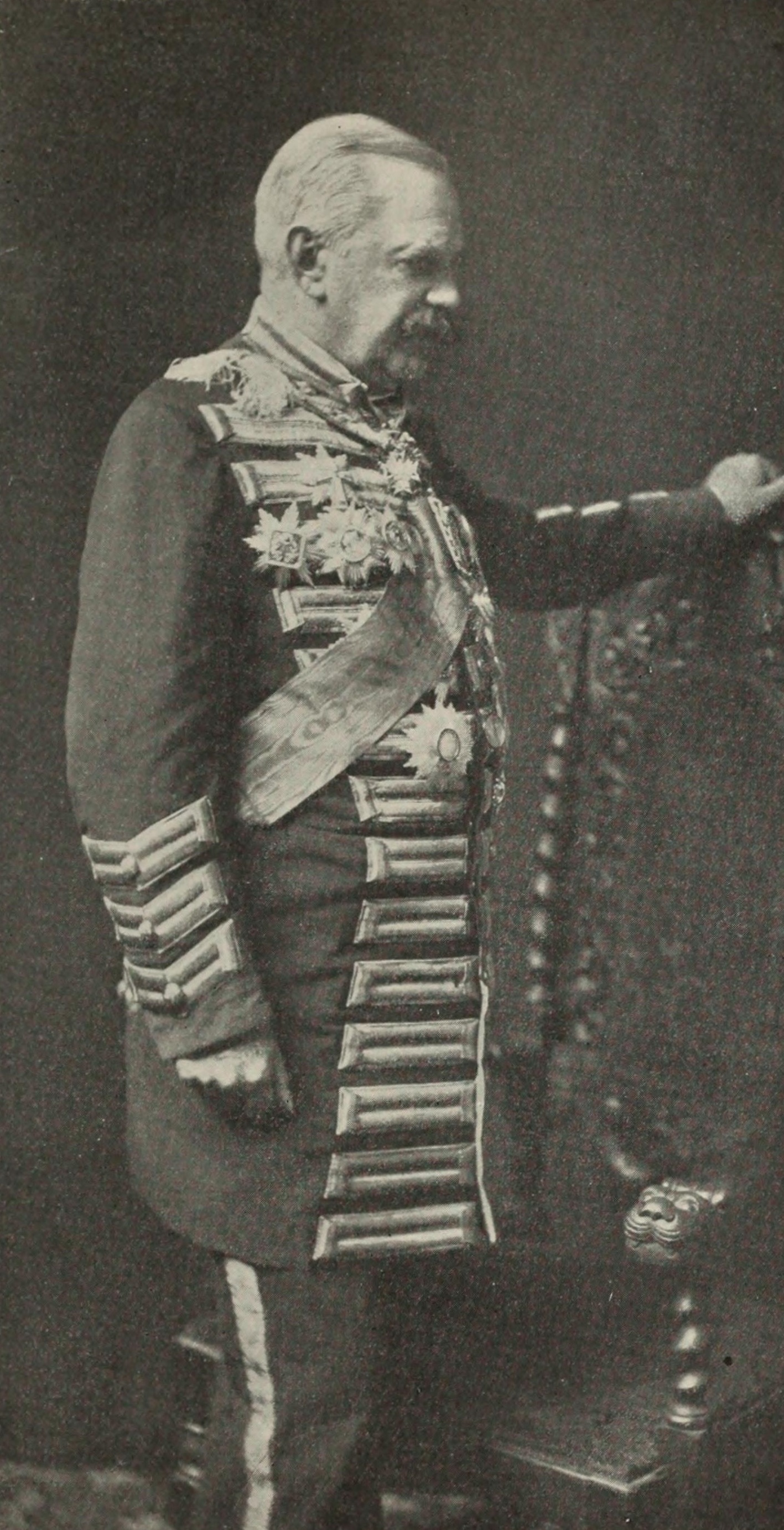
Arthur Cassini in 1904.

Edmund Morris describes Cassini's position in Washington as follows:

Hay cautioned that Cassini could not be trusted. For all his Italian nomenclature, he was as Russian as borscht, and lied with fabled virtuosity. The Ambassador, who mysteriously depended on his teenage daughter, Marguerite, for social purposes, introduced her around town as "Princess Cassini," when she was neither a princess nor, according to rumor, a Cassini. His numberless jeweled decorations may not all have been earned in the Tsar's service, but they were the glittering envy of Embassy Row. When he stood under a chandelier at receptions, he looked like a section of the Milky Way.

Amongst the most eventful issues to emerge during Cassini's tenure at Washington was an alleged plot to kill the emissary, which resulted in the Russian legation in Washington being placed under armed guard for a period in 1904. No known effort was allegedly made on his life, however, it was rumoured that Russian nihilists and pro-Japanese sympathizers were behind the plot and federal authorities took it seriously enough for him to be accompanied by armed guards during a trip to the opera in New York in October 1904. Although Cassini was said to have refused to believe the plot existed and the offer of protection, President Roosevelt himself was reported as having insisted on protection being extended.

Reports differ as to the reason for his withdrawal as ambassador, with The New York Times reporting differences over the strategy to pursue peace with Japan following the Battle of Tsushima, but Morris charging that "Cassini, having lied to Roosevelt once too often, had been tactfully recalled by the Tsar".

=== Spain ===
Following the end of his service in the United States, Cassini was appointed as ambassador to Spain and posted to Madrid. As part of his duties there, he acted as signatory for the Russian government to the agreement prepared following the Algeciras Conference on 7 April 1906.

== Later life and death ==
Cassini retired in 1909, after having spent 55 years in the service of the emperor. He died in 1919 at the age of 83.

== Honors and awards ==
For his service, Cassini was awarded decorations, including:

- Order of Saint Stanislaus, 1st degree (1884)
- Order of Saint Anna, 1st degree (1889)
- Order of Saint Vladimir, 2nd class (1895)
- Order of the White Eagle, (1898)
- Order of Saint Alexander Nevsky, (6 April 1904); insignia in diamonds (18 December 1904)
- Legion of Honour, Grand-croix (19 July 1906)

== See also ==
- History of Russia (1892–1917)
