= List of ambassadors of Russia to Spain =

Ambassador of the Russian Federation to the Kingdom of Spain
- Embajada de la Federación de Rusia en el Reino de España
- Emblem of the Russian Foreign Ministry
- Incumbent; Yury Klimenko since 18 November 2022
- Ministry of Foreign Affairs; Embassy of Russia in Madrid
- Style: His Excellency; The Honourable
- Reports to: Minister of Foreign Affairs
- Seat: Madrid
- Appointer: President of Russia
- Term length: At the pleasure of the president
- Website: Embassy of Russia in Spain

The ambassador of Russia to Spain is the official representative of the president and the government of the Russian Federation to the king and the government of Spain.

The ambassador and his staff work at large in the Russian embassy in Madrid. There is a consulate-general in Barcelona, and honorary consuls in Seville, Burgos, Valencia, and Vigo, as well as in Las Palmas in the Canary Islands. The current Russian ambassador to Spain is Yury Klimenko, incumbent since 18 November 2022. Since 1995, the ambassador to Spain has had dual accreditation to Andorra, where an honorary consul is based in Andorra la Vella.

== History of diplomatic relations ==
Formal diplomatic relations between Spain and Russia date back to the early eighteenth century and the establishment of the Russian Empire in 1721. Peter Bredal led a diplomatic mission to Spain that year on behalf of Tsar Peter the Great, and in July 1722, diplomatic relations were officially established, and a Russian diplomatic mission was opened in Madrid. The first ambassador, Sergey Golitsyn, was appointed on 22 April 1722. Diplomatic relations were broken off several times, the first being by Spain in 1730, as part of maneuvers to more closely align with France. The two countries were on opposite sides during the War of the Polish Succession between 1733 and 1735, and the War of the Austrian Succession between 1740 and 1748. Diplomatic relations were only fully restored in 1759, with Pyotr Repnin appointed envoy on 4 July 1760. The exchange of envoys continued thereafter until they were once more broken off by Spain on 15 July 1799, by which time Spain was now allied with the French First Republic, and Russia entered the War of the Second Coalition against France and its allies. Relations were restored on 14 May 1802, following the signing of the Treaty of Amiens. They continued during much of the Napoleonic Wars, until 20 September 1812, following the start of the French invasion of Russia in 1812. New ambassadors were once more appointed following the final defeat of Napoleon in 1815 and the dismantling of his empire. A further break, this time by Russia, took place in 1835, but relations were restored in 1856. In 1899 the mission was upgraded to an embassy. Relations were maintained following the February Revolution brought the end of the Russian Empire and the establishment of the Russian Provisional Government, but were broken off after the October Revolution and the Bolshevik seizure of power.

Diplomatic relations remained broken until 28 June 1933, when the Soviet Union established relations with the Second Spanish Republic. The Soviet Union supported the Republican side against the Nationalists during Spanish Civil War, until the Republicans' ultimate defeat in 1939. Spain was ruled thereafter by a right-wing dictatorship led by Francisco Franco. Diplomatic relations were only restored after Franco's death in 1975, and the Spanish transition to democracy by 1977. The exchange of ambassadors resumed with the appointment of Sergey Bogomolov on 19 February 1977. Exchange of ambassadors continued throughout the rest of the existence of the Soviet Union. With the dissolution of the Soviet Union in 1991, Spain recognised the Russian Federation as its successor state. Igor Ivanov represented Russia until 1994, and since then ambassadors have continued to be exchanged between the two countries. On 13 June 1995, diplomatic relations were established between Russia and Andorra, with the incumbent ambassador to Spain Viktor Komplektov appointed concurrently to Andorra, an arrangement that has since continued.

== List of representatives of Russia to Spain (1721–present) ==
=== Russian Empire to Spain (1721–1917) ===
Name	Title	Appointment	Termination	Notes
Peter Bredal	Head of mission	1721	1721	
Sergey Golitsyn	Envoy	22 April 1722	12 February 1726	
Ivan Shcherbatov	Envoy	12 February 1726	20 April 1730	
Diplomatic relations interrupted (1730-1759)
Aleksey Pushkin	Envoy	1742	1743	Did not present credentials
Pyotr Repnin	Envoy	4 July 1760	23 January 1763	
Pyotr Buturlin	Envoy	23 January 1763	13 January 1766	
Nikolai Khotinsky	Chargé d'affaires	June 1765	August 1767	
Otto Magnus von Stackelberg	Envoy	13 January 1766	6 August 1772	
Ivan Rikman	Chargé d'affaires	May 1771	21 May 1773	
Stepan Zinovyev	Envoy	8 September 1772	1 May 1792	
Nikolai Byutsov	Chargé d'affaires	June 1792	15 July 1799	
Aleksey Kridener	Envoy	1794	1797	
Johann Matthias von Simolin	Envoy	1798	1799	Did not travel to Spain
War of the Second Coalition - Diplomatic relations interrupted (1799-1802)
Ivan Muravyov-Apostol	Minister Plenipotentiary	23 January 1802	17 April 1805	
Grigory Stroganov	Minister Plenipotentiary	18 April 1805	4 February 1810	
Nikolai Repnin-Volkonsky	Minister Plenipotentiary	12 February 1810	11 April 1811	
Pavel Morenheim	Chargé d'affaires	11 April 1811	20 September 1812	
French invasion of Russia, War of the Sixth Coalition, Hundred Days - Diplomatic relations interrupted (1812-1815)
Dmitry Tatishchev	Envoy	15 September 1815	23 July 1821	
Mark Bulgari	Chargé d'affaires	23 July 1821	5 April 1824	
Pyotr Ubri	Envoy	5 April 1824	30 May 1835	
Diplomatic relations interrupted (1835-1856)
Mikhail Golitsyn	Envoy	5 December 1856	17 March 1860	
Ernst von Stackelberg	Envoy	4 February 1861	11 August 1862	
Aleksandr Volkonsky	Envoy	11 August 1862	1 January 1870	
Kristian Kudryavsky	Envoy	3 April 1871	8 December 1878	
Mikhail Gorchakov	Envoy	11 January 1879	26 January 1896	
Dmitry Shevich	Envoy before 1899; Ambassador after 1899	9 February 1896	1 January 1905	
Arthur Cassini	Ambassador	1 January 1905	1909	
Fyodor Budberg	Ambassador	1909	1916	
Ivan Kudashev	Ambassador	1916	3 March 1917	

=== Russian Provisional Government to Spain (1917) ===
Name	Title	Appointment	Termination	Notes
Ivan Kudashev	Ambassador	March 1917	April 1917	
Anatoly Neklyudov	Ambassador	April 1917	July 1917	
Mikhail Stakhovich	Ambassador	July 1917	26 October 1917	

=== Soviet Union to the Second Spanish Republic (1933–1939) ===
Name	Title	Appointment	Termination	Notes
Anatoly Lunacharsky	Plenipotentiary representative	20 August 1933	26 December 1933	
Marcel Rosenberg	Plenipotentiary representative	28 August 1936	19 February 1937	Credentials presented on 31 August 1936
Leon Gaikis	Plenipotentiary representative	19 February 1937	17 June 1937	Credentials presented on 16 March 1937
Sergey Marchenko	Chargé d'affaires	1937	March 1939	
Francoist Spain - Diplomatic relations interrupted (1939-1977)

=== Soviet Union to the Kingdom of Spain (1977–1991) ===
Name	Title	Appointment	Termination	Notes
Sergey Bogomolov	Ambassador	19 February 1977	9 October 1978	Credentials presented on 16 March 1977
Yuri Dubinin	Ambassador	9 October 1978	24 April 1986	Credentials presented on 26 October 1978
Sergey Romanovsky	Ambassador	24 April 1986	25 December 1991	

=== Russian Federation to Spain (1991–present) ===
Name	Title	Appointment	Termination	Notes
Igor Ivanov	Ambassador	25 December 1991	5 July 1994	
Viktor Komplektov	Ambassador	13 September 1994	20 October 1999	
Boris Mayorsky	Ambassador	20 October 1999	30 April 2002	
Mikhail Kamynin	Ambassador	30 April 2002	9 June 2005	
Aleksandr Kuznetsov	Ambassador	9 June 2005	20 February 2012	Credentials presented on 26 September 2005
Yury Korchagin	Ambassador	20 February 2012	18 November 2022	Credentials presented on 13 June 2012
Yury Klimenko	Ambassador	18 November 2022		Credentials presented on 20 April 2023
