= Marcelino Pascua =

Spanish doctor and diplomat (1897–1977)

- Born: 1897; Valladolid, Spain
- Died: 1977 (aged 79–80); Geneva, Switzerland
- Occupations: Doctor, Politician, Diplomat
- Title: Spanish ambassador to the Soviet Union
- Term: 1936–1938
- Predecessor: position created
- Successor: position vacant, chargés d’affaires until March 1939
- Political party: Spanish Socialist Workers' Party

Marcelino Pascua Martinez (14 June 1897 – 12 June 1977) was a Spanish doctor and diplomat who served during the Spanish Civil War as the ambassador of the Second Spanish Republic to the Soviet Union from September 1936 to April 1938, when he was recalled and made ambassador until the end of the war to France instead.

== Biography ==
Marcelino Pascua was born in 1897 in Valladolid. He went to Madrid to study medicine at the Institución Libre de Enseñanza from where he graduated in 1925 with a doctorate in Medicine. While there he entered the PSOE in 1919 but left after its 1920-21 split on whether to join the Third International or not.

He studied in Great Britain and in the United States with a scholarship from the Rockefeller Institute as well and was at the Antimalarial Institute of Navalmoral de la Mata in Extremadura from 1927. He went as Professor of Hygiene to Madrid Central University, rejoining the PSOE after the fall of Miguel Primo de Rivera in 1930 revolutionised Spanish politics. In April 1931 he stood for and was elected as deputy for Las Palmas to the Cortes in an election which toppled Alfonso XIII and the monarchy.

=== Minister of Health ===
On the 16th of April he was appointed as the Minister of Health by the new centre-left government under Niceto Alcalá-Zamora of the Spanish Second Republic, and held that position while he was a Member of the Board of Trustees for Pedagogical Missions. His work at the Directorate General of Public Health was prolific, with the establishment of countryside facilities, training for personnel, regulations for mental hospitals, specialised institutes for tuberculosis patients, food safety control, and more widely the establishment of a nationwide public health system that continued even during Spanish Civil War, with opposition from conservative medical and pharmaceutical lobbies that led him to resign from his position in 1933.

=== Diplomat ===
After the coup d'etat of July 1936 by the Spanish Nationalists, he was appointed as Spanish Ambassador to the Soviet Union by Prime Minister Francisco Largo Caballero, who reciprocated Marcel Rosenberg, the Soviet ambassador's appointment in August and the formalisation of the two countries' diplomatic relations, which had been resumed by recognition in 1933 but exchange of ambassadors had been halted by the coming of the right wing CEDA coalition to power in November 1933. Despite Pascua's lack of any previous diplomatic post, his speaking of rudimentary Russian from a 1932 trip to observe health practices in the USSR was deemed enough for his suitability for the position which he was granted on the 21st of September, with the approval of the PSOE's radical UGT trade union leader Caballero, who was more enthusiastic than his predecessor, the relatively conservative José Giral to enter into diplomatic relations with the USSR. A lavish send-off ceremony was held with Rosenberg, the Soviet embassy's staff, and Caballero's representative for Pascua's departure.

Once in Moscow Pascua was given the quickly dislodged Belorussian SSR's representation in Moscow's building as an embassy by the Central Committee, and privileged access to Joseph Stalin and Commissar for Foreign Affairs Maxim Litvinov, and he was tasked with managing the receipt of the Bank of Spain's gold reserve and the purchase of arms for the Spanish militias. Kowalsky writes that he was appraised by Stalin at a private meeting of his decision in early 1937 to replace his Soviet number, Rosenberg, after discontent in the Spanish government over Rosenberg "acting like a Russian viceroy", according to Spanish ambassador to France Luis Araquistain. However, as the tide of the war shifted after the Nationalists captured the entire northern sector of the Republican zone, Stalin began to distance himself from the Spanish embassy, a reflection of the Soviet reorientation towards assisting the Chinese in the Second Sino-Japanese War instead. Pascua was neglected by his own government as well, after Caballero was ousted by a Communist-led cabinet walkout in May 1937 when he refused to suppress a minority anti-communist party in Catalonia following the May Days combat. The new government of Juan Negrin seemingly concluded that subversive Soviet influence in Spain was outgrowing its constraints, and diplomatic normativity was no longer worth pursuing with the USSR, which would either continue to send what help it would to further its own interests to Spain without Pascua's efforts, or it would not do so despite anything Pascua could do if it did not suit the Soviets' interest. Pascua was neglected as he wrote to his colleagues in Valencia of his embassy's shortages:

The embassy is composed of myself, a commercial attaché… Maria [the cook] and the Russian servants…

In April 1938, following a cabinet shuffle, he was recalled and posted to Paris as ambassador to France, where he organised the sale of the Republic's assets abroad and the reception of Spanish refugees fleeing the Nationalists. He was obliged to send the chargé d'affaires in Moscow, Vicente Polo, charity from his own finances to keep the embassy running until the end of the war, indicating the Negrin government's continued disinterest in courting Soviet normative diplomacy (the Soviets approved 70 million US dollars in credit to purchase weapons that was never repaid, in 1938 when the Republic had applied for 20 million only, to keep the war alive) and resigned after the French government's recognition of the Franco regime on the 27th of February 1939. He went into exile in Puerto Rico.

=== Exile and retirement ===
He returned to his medical role at Johns Hopkins University in Baltimore, Maryland, and was appointed as an official of the WHO in Switzerland until 1957, choosing not to participate in the Spanish Republican government-in-exile. He retired and settled in Geneva, where he published a biostatistics methodology manual in 1965 and visited Chile in 1958. He visited Spain in 1975, at the death of Franco, and passed through Valladolid, Alicante, Barcelona and Madrid. At his death, his papers were donated to the Spanish state.
