= Maury Henry Biddle Paul =

American journalist

- Born: April 14, 1890; Philadelphia, Pennsylvania, US
- Died: July 17, 1942 (aged 52); New York City, US
- Resting place: Caballero Rivero Woodlawn Park North Cemetery and Mausoleum
- Other name: Cholly Knickerbocker
- Education: Episcopal Academy
- Alma mater: University of Pennsylvania
- Occupation: Journalist
- Years active: 1914–1942

Maury Henry Biddle Paul (April 14, 1890 – July 17, 1942) was an American journalist who became famous as a society columnist for the New York American (which became the New York Journal-American in 1937 when it merged with the New York Evening Journal). Writing under the pseudonym "Cholly Knickerbocker", he coined the term "café society". The name "Cholly Knickerbocker" was owned by the Hearst Newspaper Syndicate, and Paul was the first, writing under the nom de plume from 1917 until his death in 1942.

== Early years and career ==
Paul was born in Philadelphia to William Henry Paul, a real estate agent, and the former Eleanor Virginia Shivers. He was a member of the Sons of the Revolution and the Society of the War of 1812. He attended the Episcopal Academy and later graduated from the University of Pennsylvania. In 1914, he began his career as a newspaperman at the Philadelphia Times. His apprenticeship was brief, and he was soon hired by the New York Press as society editor. In 1917, he moved to Hearst's New York American, where he took over the "Cholly Knickerbocker" gossip column that focused on members of high society.

In addition to coining the phrase "cafe society" to describe the people who frequented tony night clubs and expensive restaurants, Maury Paul also invented the expression "The Old Guard" (frequently known as "the Four Hundred") for the venerable New York families. Paul focused on the very well-born and extremely rich. In addition to his daily column, each week he wrote three features for the Sunday edition of the American. In 1937, the Evening Journal merged with the American to become the New York Journal-American. Paul's column and features were carried by the more than 60 newspapers of the Hearst syndicate.

== Death ==
On July 17, 1942, Paul died of an illness caused by a heart condition at his New York City home. He was 52 years old. He was succeeded as Cholly Knickerbocker by Igor Cassini. His funeral was held on July 20 at St. Bartholomew's Episcopal Church in Manhattan. His remains were later shipped to Florida and interred at the Caballero Rivero Woodlawn Park North Cemetery and Mausoleum in Miami where Paul owned a summer home. His biography, Champagne Cholly, was written by his secretary, Eve Brown.

== See also ==
- Society reporting
