= Igor Cassini =

Russian-American journalist (1915–2002)

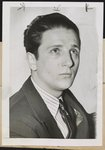
- Born: Count Igor Cassini Loiewski; September 15, 1915; Sevastopol, Russian Empire
- Died: January 5, 2002 (aged 86); New York City, U.S.
- Occupations: Journalist; gossip columnist
- Spouses: Austine Byrne McDonnell (m. 1940; div. 1947) Elizabeth Darrah Waters (m. 1948; div. 1952) Charlene Stafford Wrightsman (m. 1952; died 1963) Gianna Lou Müller (m. 1969; div. 1972) Brenda Mitchell (m. 1973; div. 1996)
- Relatives: Arthur Cassini (grandfather); Oleg Cassini (brother)

Count Igor Cassini Loiewski (September 15, 1915 – January 5, 2002) was a Russian-American syndicated gossip columnist for the Hearst newspaper chain. He was one of the journalists to write the Cholly Knickerbocker column.

== Career ==
He was born Count Igor Cassini Loiewski, the younger son of Count Alexander Loiewski, a Russian diplomat, and Countess Marguerite Cassini, daughter of aristocratic Russian diplomat Arthur Cassini. Igor worked as a publicist, ran the Celebrity Register, edited a short-lived magazine called Status, was a co-director of the fashion company House of Cassini, founded by his elder brother, Oleg Cassini, and was a television personality in the 1950s and 1960s, until he was convicted of being a paid agent of the dictator of the Dominican Republic Rafael Trujillo without registering, as required by U.S. law.

Cassini's first attention at a national level was achieved in the summer of 1939 when, as a result of a column he wrote that upset members of Virginia high society, he was kidnapped, tarred and feathered by a trio of locals near Warrenton, Virginia. Cassini himself later reflected, "From an obscure junior society columnist always worried as to how I would ever find enough material to fill the space I was grudgingly given, I became national news overnight."

Cassini's height of influence was in the 1950s, when the Hearst chain claimed 20,000,000 readership for papers that carried his column. He coined the term "jet set" to describe the global movements of what had been "café society" — those who entertained at restaurants and night clubs and hobnobbed with the stars of the entertainment industry. His pen name evoked the fictional quintessential New Yorker, "Diedrich Knickerbocker", who was created by Washington Irving. The term "café society" had been invented by Maury Paul, Cassini's predecessor as "Cholly Knickerbocker" at the New York Journal American.

Later in his career, Igor, who was known as "Ghighi", hired a young assistant from Texas named Liz Smith. He also was the host of The Igor Cassini Show, an interview program that aired on the DuMont Television Network from October 25, 1953, to February 28, 1954, as well as another television program, Igor Cassini's Million Dollar Showcase.

On October 8, 1963, Cassini pleaded "nolo contendere" to criminal charges that he had been a paid agent of Rafael Trujillo, the dictator of the Dominican Republic, and had failed to register as required by the Foreign Agent Registration Act. After Trujillo died in 1961, the new government of the Dominican Republic released evidence showing that Cassini had been hired on the basis that he could use his contacts and those of his brother, Oleg, one of the First Lady's favorite dress designers, to influence the Kennedy Administration. Cassini paid a fine of $10,000 and lost his job with Hearst.

His autobiography, co-written with Jeanne Molli, I'd Do It All Over Again: The Life and Times of Igor Cassini, appeared in 1977 (ISBN 0-399-11553-6).

== Family and childhood ==
He was born in Sevastopol, Russian Empire, and his elder brother, Oleg Cassini, became a fashion designer best known for dressing First Lady Jacqueline Kennedy. They were the sons of Countess Marguerite Cassini, an Italian-Russian aristocrat, and her husband, Count Alexander Loiewski, a Russian diplomat. His maternal grandfather, Arthur Paul Nicholas Cassini, Marquis de Capuzzuchi di Bologna, Count Cassini, was the Russian ambassador to the United States during the administrations of William McKinley and Theodore Roosevelt.

Cassini's father later adopted his wife's surname, which they deemed more distinguished, and when the family lost its status and fortune in the wake of the Russian Revolution of 1917, the family moved to Italy, where Marguerite Cassini went to work as a fashion designer. Igor Cassini Loiewski was raised in Italy, and moved to the United States in 1936 with his parents and elder brother.

== Marriages ==
His first marriage, in 1940, was to Austine Byrne McDonnell (1920–1991), a Hearst journalist known as "The Most Magnificent Doll Among American Newspaperwomen". She also screen tested for the role of Melanie Wilkes in the motion picture Gone with the Wind. At the time of their marriage, Igor had already been naturalized as a U.S. citizen and they both worked for the Washington Times-Herald. They had no children. Known as Bootsie, she divorced him in 1947 and the next year became the third wife of William Randolph Hearst Jr. During and after her marriage to Cassini, she wrote "These Charming People", the society column of Washington Times-Herald, under the bylines Austine Cassini and Austine.

His second wife was fashion model Elizabeth Darrah Waters (b.1929), daughter of Frank Alexander Waters and Eleanor Van Buskirk of Bedford, NY, whom he married in 1948 and divorced in 1952. The couple had one daughter, Marina.

His third wife, whom he married in 1952, was Charlene Stafford Wrightsman (1927–1963), the younger daughter of Charles B. Wrightsman, an oil millionaire whose collection of French and Austrian furniture — much of which was acquired through the designers Denning & Fourcade — and decorative arts fills several galleries at the Metropolitan Museum. She was previously married (1947–1950) to the actor Helmut Dantine, by whom she had a son, Dana Wrightsman Dantine. She and Cassini had one son, Alexander.

On April 8, 1963, while in her bedroom, with her 14-year-old stepdaughter, Marina Cassini, by her side, as the teenager watched the 35th Academy Awards on television, Charlene Cassini swallowed 30 sleeping pills and died the next day. She reportedly was distraught after Attorney General Robert F. Kennedy indicted her husband for failing to register under the U.S. Registration Act, as an agent of a foreign government. A public relations agency Cassini helped found, Martial & Company, acquired on the Dominican Republic as a client, leaving Cassini responsible, at least as the United States Department of Justice was concerned, as an agent of the Caribbean nation.

Charlene Cassini also suffered from headaches following a minor household accident, was depressed after the suicide of a ski instructor friend, and had become bitterly estranged from her father. After his wife's death, Cassini later wrote, "We discovered the apartment, particularly her closets, littered with all kinds of pills, hidden in vases, under linens, stuffed in her shoes and the pockets of her clothes."

Cassini's fourth wife was the actress Gianna Lou Müller, better known as Nadia Cassini, whom he married in 1969 and divorced in 1972.

His fifth wife was Brenda Mitchell, a top fashion model, from whom he also was divorced. They had two sons, Nicholas, formerly a professional golfer on the Nationwide Tour and Dimitri, who is involved in international real estate.

== Death ==
He died at his home in Manhattan, aged 86, from natural causes.
