= Marcel Rosenberg =

Soviet diplomat (1896–1938)

- Марсель Розенберг
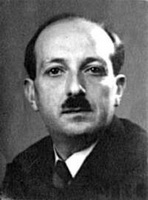

Soviet ambassador to Spain
- In office August 28, 1936 – February 19, 1937
- Preceded by: Anatoly Lunacharsky
- Succeeded by: Leon Gaikis

Personal details
- Born: 1896 Warsaw, Congress Poland, Russian Empire
- Died: 1938 (aged 41–42) Russian SFSR, Soviet Union
- Party: Communist Party of the Soviet Union

Marcel Izrailevich Rosenberg (1896 — 5 March 1938) was a Soviet diplomat most notable for being Ambassador of the Soviet Union to Republican Spain from August 1936 to February 1937. He was then recalled and executed.

== Biography ==
Rosenberg was born into the family of a Jewish trader who in 1906 emigrated from Poland with his family to Königsberg in East Prussia and later to Berlin. In 1918 he was part of the first generation of Soviet diplomats after the October Revolution, serving as the Soviet Union’s ambassador to Kemalist Turkey briefly in 1923, to Germany and China, to France briefly in 1934, and also afterward to the League of Nations after the USSR was admitted in 1934 as part of an attempt by the USSR to normalise diplomatic relations with the West to seek allies after the rise of Adolf Hitler to power in Nazi Germany.

=== Ambassador to Spain ===
Rosenberg was the first Soviet ambassador to Spain, since diplomatic recognition of the USSR by Spain had not been given during the 1920s and Second Spanish Republic due to rightist opposition during the so-called Black Biennial (November 1933- February 1936).This diplomatic exchange happened almost immediately after the coup attempt of the 18th of July 1936 by the Army of Africa and several generals such as Francisco Franco that started the Spanish Civil War. He was appointed Ambassador and arrived at Madrid to a lukewarm welcome. His opposite number, appointed by Francisco Largo Caballero as prime minister after the 4th of September, was Marcelino Pascua, who was fêted in Leningrad upon his arrival that October.

Upon Rosenberg’s arrival he conspicuously declared:

I know perfectly well the government of the Spanish Republic does not wish to have alien political and social ideas thrust upon its native ones. This desire fully corresponds to that of my government.

However, he set about his work with an unmistakable gusto that eventually wore his hosts’ reception out, and his demands for military substitution and appointments were looked on as condescending and “viceregal”, according to socialist Luis Araquistain in his 1939 memoirs, quoted this heated outburst by Caballero at Rosenberg witnessed by several other people outside his office:

Get out! Get out! You must learn, Señor Ambassador, that Spaniards may be poor and need help from abroad, but we are sufficiently proud not to accept that a foreign ambassador should try to impose his will on the head of the Spanish government.

The animosity he generated was such that in a “fraternal greeting” of December 1936 written by Joseph Stalin, Vyacheslav Molotov and Kliment Voroshilov to Caballero, Stalin explicitly asked if Rosenberg was to the Spanish Government’s liking. Despite Caballero’s positive reply in February 1937 Rosenberg was recalled to the Soviet Union where he was soon executed during the Great Purge. He was succeeded in office by Leon Gaikis, who faced a similar fate that June, and was executed. From May 1937 until the end of the war, the Soviet ambassadorial posting to Spain was left vacant, symptomatic of the USSR writing Spain off as lost and focusing resources on the Second Sino-Japanese War instead, and the embassy was run by a chargé d’affaires, Sergey Marchenko, until the Republican defeat in March 1939, who was himself executed in 1941.
