= Oleg Cassini =

Russian-American fashion designer (1913–2006)

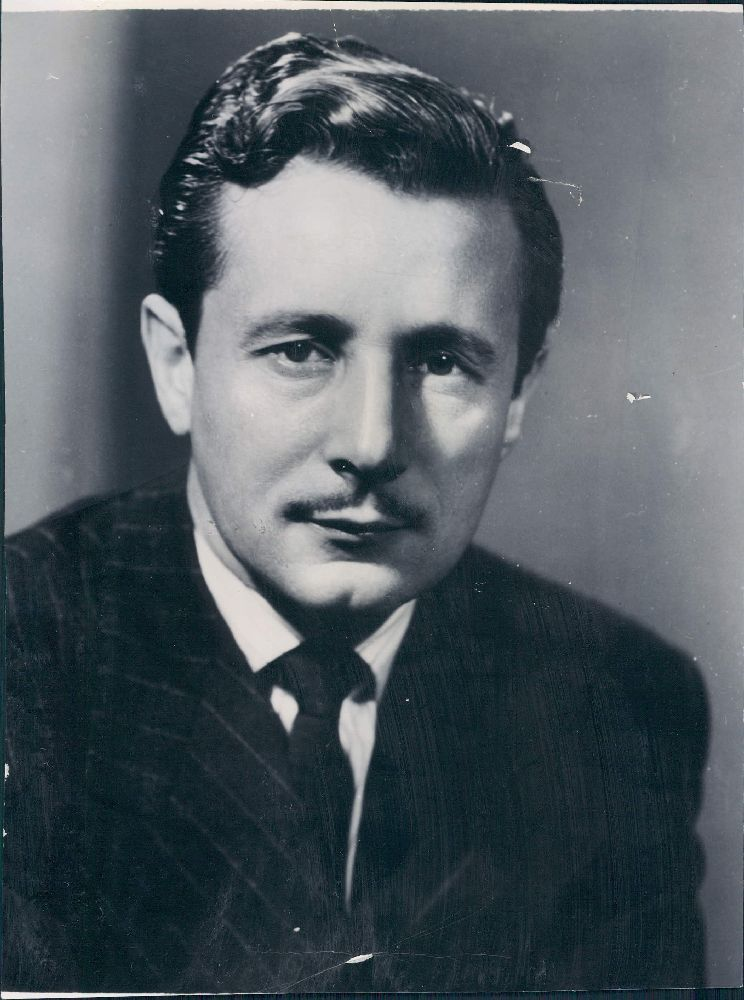
- Cassini in 1955
- Born: Oleg Cassini Loiewski; 11 April 1913; Paris, France
- Died: 17 March 2006 (aged 92); Manhasset, New York, U.S.
- Occupation: Fashion designer
- Label: Oleg Cassini
- Spouses: Mary "Merry" Fahrney (m. 1938; div. 1940) Gene Tierney (m. 1941; div. 1952) Marianne Nestor (m. 1971)
- Children: 2

Oleg Cassini (11 April 1913 – 17 March 2006) was a fashion designer born to an aristocratic Russian family with maternal Italian ancestry. He came to the United States as a young man after launching his career as a designer in Rome, and quickly secured a position with Paramount Pictures. Cassini established his reputation by designing for films.

He became particularly well known as a designer for Jacqueline Kennedy while she was First Lady of the United States. The "Jackie Look" was to become highly influential and much admired. Among Cassini's inspirations were sports and Native American culture.

== Early life ==
He was born in Paris as Oleg Aleksandrovich Loiewski, the elder son of Countess Marguerite Cassini and her husband Count Alexander Loiewski, a Russian diplomat, thereby obtaining the title of Count. His maternal grandfather Arthur Paul Nicholas Cassini, Marquis de Capuzzuchi di Bologna, Count Cassini, had been the Russian ambassador to the United States during the administrations of William McKinley and Theodore Roosevelt. Count Arthur Cassini signed the treaty ending the war between Japan and China. His mother's family claimed Italian astronomer Giovanni Domenico Cassini as an ancestor. In 1918, the Russian Revolution caused the Loiewski family to flee for their lives, leaving behind their wealth, lands, and homes. As a young child, Oleg saw his cousin shot to death. The family arrived in Denmark and then relocated to Switzerland. The Greek Royal family invited them to Greece, but while traveling through Italy, a revolution also began in Greece. They got off the train in Florence, eventually settling there. In Italy, the children started using the surname of Cassini.

In his early youth, Cassini suffered a significant accident, almost losing his leg. He spent nearly a year in bed recovering, during which time he studied history and read extensively, including works by American James Fenimore Cooper. He developed a love of history and the mysticism of Native American tribes. He also discovered American culture through the movies from the United States that were shown in Italy.

When he started school, Oleg had to learn Italian, but he already knew Russian, French, and Danish. His mother, Marguerite Cassini, founded her fashion house in Florence, gaining American clients through acquaintances she had made in Washington, D.C., as the daughter of Count Arthur Cassini.

Cassini played soccer with the teenage team, the "Boys" of Fiorentina, and was a member of the university track and ski teams. He also played tennis for the Italian Jr. Davis Cup team, becoming Italian Jr. Champion.

=== Education ===
My Preoccupation is to make women look beautiful.

— Time, 2005

Cassini studied political science at the University of Florence and became an accomplished equestrian. He studied fine art under painter Giorgio de Chirico at the Accademia di Belle Arti Firenze. Eventually he started in fashion, studying under the French couturier, Jean Patou. Cassini won a number of international fashion competitions in Turin, including five first prizes in Mostra Della Moda for sketches and Most Creative Presentation for an evening dress painted in dramatic colors on silver foil, garnering a prize of 5,000 lire. Cassini opened his own boutique in Rome and designed for the local film industry as well as Roman society.

=== Move to the United States ===
Oleg became engaged to a debutante in Rome, Anna Donnina Toeplitz, and subsequently left for the United States after winning a duel. He sailed on the Saturnia and arrived in New York on Christmas Day 1936. His autobiography describes his possessions upon arrival in the US as being limited to a tuxedo, two tennis rackets, a title, and talent. He briefly worked as a political cartoonist in Washington, D.C., upon his arrival prior to traveling to Hollywood.

== Career ==
=== Hollywood ===
Upon arriving in California, Cassini began playing tennis at the West Side Tennis Club. After he competed in and won a doubles tournament, his partner introduced himself as the head of Paramount Pictures, saying he was "looking for another designer". Cassini went to the studio the next day and got the job as a full designer for Paramount Pictures. In 1941, his first film was I Wanted Wings, for which he created the look for its star, newcomer Veronica Lake.

Better than most—second to none.

— Oleg Cassini personal motto

Cassini designed costumes for films including The Shanghai Gesture (1941), starring Gene Tierney, Tales of Manhattan (1942) for Rita Hayworth, The Razor's Edge (1946), It's a Joke Son! (1947), Born to Speed (1947), Lost Honeymoon (1947), The Ghost and Mrs. Muir (1947), That Wonderful Urge (1948), Whirlpool (1949), Night and the City (1950), Where the Sidewalk Ends (1950), as well as The Mating Season, Close to My Heart, On the Riviera (all 1951), Rampage (1963), The Tammy Grimes Show (1966), The Day Dreamer (1966), Peligro ... ! Mujeres en acción, (1967), The Ambushers (1967) for Dean Martin, SOS Conspiracion Bikini (1967), The Sentinel (2006) for Kim Basinger, and Say It in Russian (2007) for Faye Dunaway.

His designs are worn in the climactic scene of Meet Joe Black (1998) and throughout Ready or Not (2009). He worked for the major film studios and dressed numerous stars over the course of his career including Audrey Hepburn, Shirley Temple, Anita Ekberg, Janet Leigh, Loretta Young, Rita Hayworth, Betty Grable, Joan Crawford, Marilyn Monroe, Natalie Wood, Ursula Andress, Jayne Mansfield, Lana Turner, Sandra Dee, Suzy Parker, Gina Lollobrigida, Renée Zellweger, Malin Åkerman, Kim Basinger, Carroll Baker and Taylor Swift.

=== World War II ===
After the attack on Pearl Harbor, Cassini quickly enlisted in the war effort. Initially, he joined the United States Coast Guard, but he later served in the U.S. Army as a cavalry officer. He reached the rank of first lieutenant. Cassini became a United States citizen (in December 1941/January 1942, losing his titles of nobility); he was commissioned as a first Lieutenant at Fort Riley, Kansas. After serving five years in the U.S. Cavalry, Cassini moved to New York City in 1952 to open his own fashion house on Seventh Avenue, the center of the fashion industry.

=== New York ===
After the war, Cassini designed ready-to-wear dresses while continuing to design for television, motion pictures, and Broadway theatre. According to his autobiography, Jack L. Warner offered Cassini the position of head of design for Warner Bros. Studios proclaiming, "You're better than Errol Flynn". He remained in New York rather than work with Warner Brothers and opened his own designer brand. Cassini had enough money to launch one line, his first Collection, which was received with rave reviews.

The head of Lord & Taylor, Dorothy Shaver, provided the Oleg Cassini Collection the entirety of the store's Fifth Avenue store front windows to launch the collection. Cassini also took his designs "on the road" to his customers in trunk shows and special fashion events in order to promote the new lines. The in store events evolved into the emerging medium of television and Cassini displayed his product on Steve Allen, Jack Paar, Dinah Shore, Phil Donahue, and Good Morning America. The Tonight Show Starring Johnny Carson provided nightly recognition as Carson had a line designed for him by Cassini, which he wore exclusively for the show.

His reputation developed as a result of his genius for original spontaneous design and in 1953, shortly before her marriage to John Kennedy, Cassini met Jacqueline Bouvier, named by his brother, society columnist Cholly Knickerbocker as "Queen Deb of the Year" in 1947.

=== Secretary of Style to the White House ===
Oleg, you are, and will be in fashion history, the designer who created the indelible and stylish image for the First Lady. You should be proud of your achievement, you are the designer who inaugurated her style.

— Suzy Menkes Fashion Editor; International Herald Tribune, 2003.

I dressed Jackie to be a star in a major film, which she was, the most famous first lady of all time. I became her secretary of style.

— Cassini on Jackie Kennedy

Cassini's appointment by Jacqueline Kennedy as her exclusive couturier in 1961 dubbed him her "Secretary of Style" and provided him a position of prestige. "We are on the threshold of a new American elegance thanks to Mrs. Kennedy's beauty, naturalness, understatement, exposure and symbolism," Cassini said when his selection as the couturier to shape the entire look of the First Lady was announced.

Utilizing the technique and high fashion fabrics of French couture, Cassini's designs for Jacqueline Kennedy ushered in a new era of simplicity based on clean lines and crisp forms and opulent and luxurious fabrics. Cassini brought American design to the world stage as the First Lady's identity became synonymous with sophistication and taste. The "Jackie look" that he created was copied by women all over the world. Cassini visualized her as an American Queen and Mrs. Kennedy acknowledged that "Oleg dressed me for the part".

Oleg Cassini's remarkable talent helped Jackie and the New Frontier get off to a magnificent start. Their historic collaboration gave us memorable changes in fashion, and style classics that remain timeless to this day.

— Senator Edward Kennedy on Cassini (quote abridged)

The publicity Cassini derived from his work for Mrs. Kennedy led women from 18 to 80 to copy the look of simple, geometric dresses in sumptuous fabrics and pillbox hats with an elegant coiffure. Meticulously tailored and featuring oversized buttons and boxy jackets, as well as occasionally dramatic décolletage. Cassini designed a reported 300 outfits for the First Lady, including a much-copied coat made of leopard pelts and a Swiss double satin white gown decorated by a single cocarde which she wore to the Inaugural Gala Ball in 1961. This was Mrs. Kennedy's first official appearance as First Lady Elect. The dress was subsequently named one of the "50 Dresses that Changed the World" by the Design Museum in England. The popularity of the leopard-skin coat, worn by Jacqueline Kennedy in 1962, led to a surge in demand for real leopard fur, contributing to the deaths of an estimated 250,000 leopards. Cassini blamed himself for their deaths and became an advocate for animal rights, promoting faux fur alternatives, including the introduction of micro-fiber synthetic furs in 1999.

In 1961, Eugenia Sheppard announced in the New York Herald Tribune, "According to Tobe's most recent coast to coast survey, the best known name in American fashion is Oleg Cassini."

=== Designer licensing ===
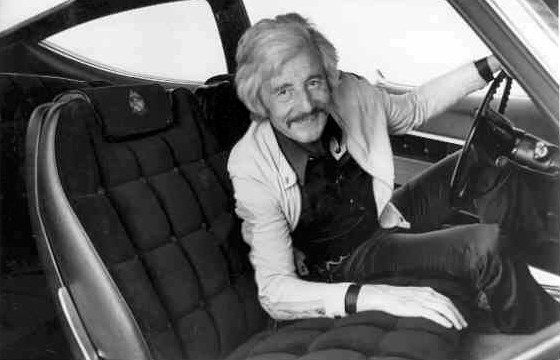
Cassini in the 1974 AMC Matador showing some of the interior trim he designed

Cassini became known primarily for his licensing agreements. He was the recipient of a Doctorate of Fine Arts in 1989.

His name was licensed for a wide range of consumer products, including luggage, nail polish, as well as on coupé versions of the 1974 and 1975 AMC Matador automobile. The Oleg Cassini Matador featured distinctive exterior striping, rub rails, wheel covers, and a crest identifying the designer edition. Cassini also appeared in AMC advertising campaigns promoting the model, which was marketed as a "personal luxury car". The designer edition has since attracted interest among automotive collectors.

== Recognition ==
=== Milestones ===
In 1960, with his younger brother, society columnist Igor, Oleg opened Le Club in Manhattan, which becomes a leading private club with such members as Gianni Agnelli, Stavros Niarchos, Aristotle Onassis, and Ray Stark. In 1960 Oleg Cassini was named personal couturier by Mrs. Kennedy, launching the Jackie look in 1961. He was awarded the Chicago Gold Coast Award for Excellence in Design. In 1962, he was awarded the National Cystic Fibrosis Distinguished Service Citation. In 1967, he created deep tonal shirts for men adding special colors where there had only been white. The sales of dress shirts rose dramatically, and the look was launched on The Tonight Show, starring Johnny Carson. Oleg created the "Johnny Carson" line of Men's wear. In 1968, the peacock revolution is hailed by Newsweek, wherein Cassini is credited with leading a revolution in men's fashion worldwide. The "Competitors" Collection menswear campaign was also launched by Cassini. It featured icons of sport wearing Cassini including: Ted Turner for sailing, Bob Hope and Raymond Floyd for golf, Michael Jordan for basketball, Mario Andretti for racing, Gary Carter for baseball, Lynn Swann and Lawrence Taylor for football and Charlton Heston, Regis Philbin, and Kenny Rogers for tennis.

In 2003 The Council of Fashion Designers of America Board of Directors noted Cassini's extraordinary design achievements with their first ever, Board of Directors Special Tribute. The presentation was made to Oleg by President Stan Herman and Diane von Furstenberg.

I am addicted to the habit of winning. If I am going to compete, I want to win, no point in being there for the walk.

— Cassini quoted on sports

In 2003, Cassini was crowned King of the Beaux Arts Ball.

=== Sportsman ===
Oleg Cassini excelled at tennis and competed seriously since his early days as a ranked Italian Junior Davis Cup player. His skill at tennis led to a fortuitous design connection. Recounted in his autobiography, newly arrived in Hollywood, Cassini played tennis at the prestigious West Side Tennis Club which led to a doubles game with the head of Paramount Pictures. Decades later, Cassini also created collections of printed and multi color tennis wear, bringing 'color to the court'. He is noted for having outfitted the US Davis Cup team and for participating in celebrity pro-am tournaments such as the Alan King Tournament in Las Vegas. Cassini also participated and won the 5th Annual RFK Pro Celebrity Tennis Tournament in 1976. The silver winner's cup was presented to him personally by Jackie Kennedy Onassis.

Cassini competed professionally in the sport of harness racing. In 1985 he earned a professional harness driver's license and won races at the Meadowlands Raceway, Yonkers Raceway, Freehold Raceway, Monticello Raceway, and Roosevelt Raceway. He received awards in recognition of his efforts to support equine charities from "HORSE" and "The Equine Society" which recognized Cassini with its Man of the year award. He participated in golfing events, scoring three holes in one at the Deepdale Golf Club and one hole in one at the Westhampton Golf Club. Cassini also participated in the ABC TV Superstars Competition.

=== Humanitarian ===
Oleg Cassini received the James Herriot Award (All Creatures Great and Small) as the Man of the Year from the Humane Society of the United States for his work and care for animals. He created collections of manmade fashion fur, the 'evolutionary furs'.

In 1999, he was awarded the Humanitarian Award at a fashion show and Gala at the National Building Museum in Washington, DC, honorary chairpersons Eunice Shriver and Senator Ted Kennedy, show hosted by Montel Williams. Among the 40 models were movie star Tippi Hedren. In his own words "What we're designing is as elegant and attractive as fur and eliminates the enormous cruelty that goes on in the killing of animals for fur."

In his autobiography Cassini claims to have suggested to President Kennedy that he take steps to organize the Bureau of Indian Affairs, the action which led to the American Indian Movement. Cassini was named an honorary member of the Chickasaw and Navajo nations in 1981 due to his fund raising and organization of gala charity events for the tribes. Cassini and his brother Igor, under the pen name of society columnist Cholly Knickerbocker, threw the "Knickerbocker Charity Balls" to raise money for the tribes.

== Books and television ==
Cassini wrote best-selling books, including In My Own Fashion; A Thousand Days of Magic: Dressing Jacqueline Kennedy for the White House, which is a tribute to Jacqueline Kennedy and reflects the "Camelot Era" and the "Jackie Look"; and Oleg Cassini: The Wedding Dress.

He appeared on hundreds of television shows worldwide in many languages, and also hosted a special 13-part TV series, Conversations with Cassini, on the Arts & Entertainment Network.

== Personal life ==
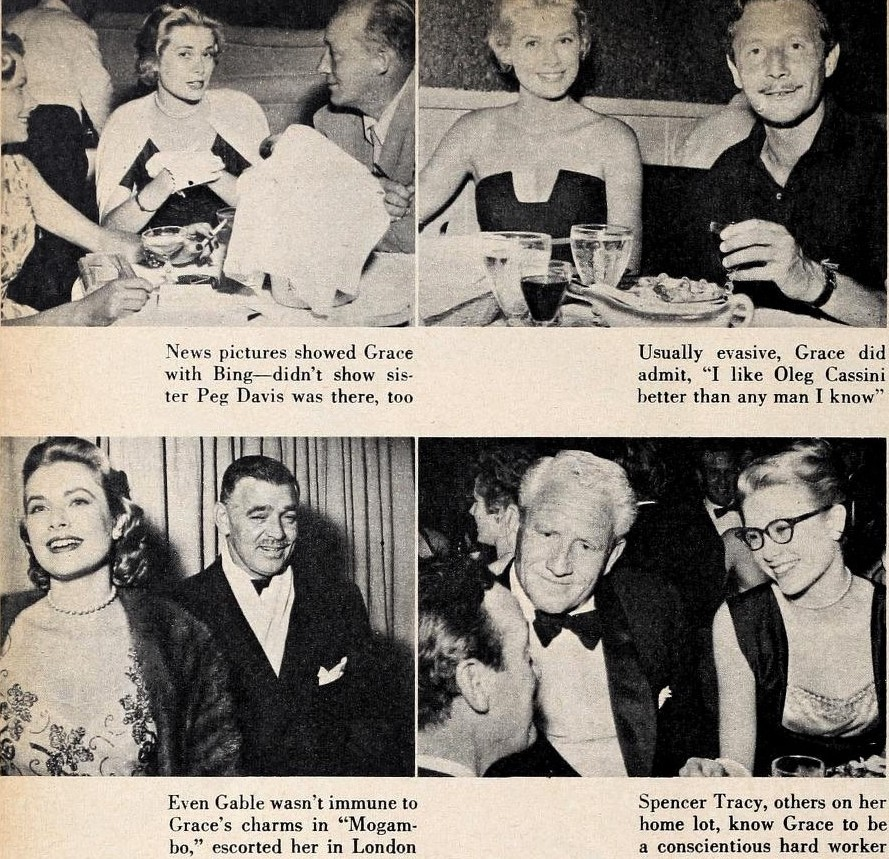
Cassini and others (Bing Crosby, Clark Gable and Spencer Tracy) enjoying nightlife with Grace Kelly in 1954

On September 2, 1938, in Elkton, Maryland, Cassini became the husband of Mary "Merry" Fahrney (1910–1974). The couple divorced in 1940.

Cassini married actress Gene Tierney on June 2, 1941. Their daughter, Antoinette Daria, was born on 15 October 1943, blind, deaf, and with severe brain damage. She died on 11 September 2010. The couple separated on 20 October 1946, and entered into a property settlement agreement on 10 November 1946 in which Cassini's fifty percent share of the marital estate was dedicated to the ongoing care of Daria. Tierney won an uncontested divorce in California on 13 March 1947, and the divorce would have been finalized one year later, on 13 March 1948. However, according to Cassini's diary, they reconciled some months before that. They announced that they were back together in April 1948. Gossip columnist Hedda Hopper reported the news in the Los Angeles Times on 9 April 1948. Their second daughter, Christina ("Tina"), was born on 19 November 1948 and died in 2015. The couple finally divorced in 1953.

After his divorce from Tierney, Cassini dated and was engaged to Grace Kelly.

Susanna Moore claims that she was raped by Cassini.

Cassini and Tierney remained cordial until her 1991 death, when she bequeathed one dollar to their daughter Daria and the residual to Christina.

In 1971, Cassini married model Marianne Nestor. Beginning in 1971, Marianne operated the licensing and public relations portion of the brand, which they famously defended. Their marriage was kept secret until after his death.

== Death ==
Oleg Cassini died from complications of an aneurysm in Manhasset, New York, in 2006 at age 92.

In his will, Cassini bequeathed $500,000 in trust to his daughter Daria and $1,000,000 to Christina. Christina sued Cassini's widow Marianne Nestor for one quarter of his estate, based on the agreement in the divorce settlement with Tierney, but Nestor argued that the divorce decree was overridden by the will. Nestor claimed the provision was unenforceable as it had been made more than 60 years previously. Despite the New York Surrogate Court ruling in favour of Christina, she did not receive her inheritance before she died in poverty in 2015.

In September 2018, Newsday, updated the history of the legal battle. At the time, Nestor was in jail for refusing to comply with a court order. Cassini's estate was auctioned by Doyle in June 2019.
