= Beez =

Beez may refer to:

- Béez, a tributary of the Gave de Pau, in Béarn, France
- Beez, Namur, a sub-municipality of the city of Namur, Belgium
- Richard Beez (1827–1902), German mathematician
- "Beez", a song by Kid Cudi from the 2013 album Indicud

== See also ==
- Bez (disambiguation)
- Beetz
- Beets (disambiguation)
