= Foreign policy of the Russian Empire =

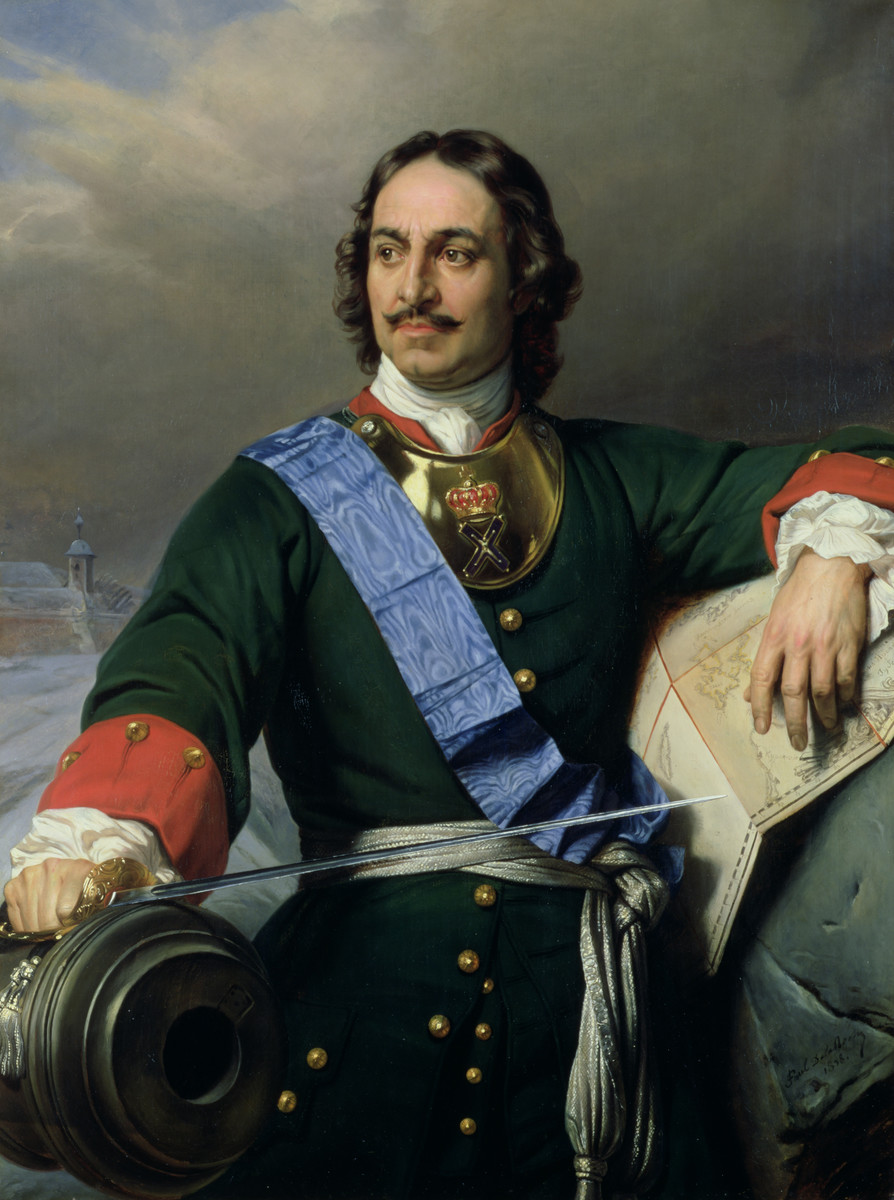
Tsar Peter the Great officially renamed the Tsardom of Russia as the Russian Empire in 1721, and became its first emperor

The foreign policy of the Russian Empire covers Russian foreign relations from their origins in the policies of the Tsardom of Russia (until 1721) down to the end of the Russian Empire in 1917. Under the system tsarist autocracy, the Emperors/Empresses (at least theoretically) made all the main decisions in the Russian Empire, so a uniformity of policy and a forcefulness resulted during the long regimes of powerful leaders such as Peter the Great (r. 1682–1725) and Catherine the Great (r. 1762–1796). However, several weak tsars also reigned—such as children with a regent in control—and numerous plots and assassinations occurred. With weak rulers or rapid turnovers on the throne, unpredictability and even chaos could result.

Russia played a relatively minor role in the Napoleonic Wars until 1812, when the Imperial Russian Army virtually destroyed Napoleon's huge army when it invaded Russia. Russia played a major role in the eventual defeat of Napoleon and in setting conservative terms for the restoration of aristocratic Europe during the period of 1815 to 1848 as the Holy Alliance. Russia conducted several wars with the Ottoman Empire between 1568 and 1918, and in 1856 Russia lost the Crimean War to a coalition of Britain, France and the Ottoman Empire. More small wars followed in the late-19th century, as well as the large-scale Balkan War of 1877-1878.

For three centuries, from the days of Ivan the Terrible (ruled 1547 to 1584), Russia expanded in all directions at a rate of 18,000 square miles per year, becoming by far the largest power in terms of contiguous land area. The expansion brought under Russian governance many minority ethnic groups who had their own religions and languages. The Imperial Russian political system was an autocracy ruled by the tsar; in its later days it was challenged by various revolutionary groups who were rendered largely ineffective by a tough police state that sent many thousands of its opponents into exile in remote Russian Siberia. Territorial expansion had slowed by the 1850s, but there was a southward conquest in Central Asia toward Afghanistan and India greatly troubling Britain, which controlled India, leading to the Great Game. Russia also acquired territories in Manchuria from the Qing Dynasty. Russia's main historic enemy was the Ottoman Empire, which controlled Russia's access to the Mediterranean Sea. Later tsars sponsored Slavic insurgents in the Balkans against the Ottomans. Serbia supported insurgents against Austria, and Russia stood behind Serbia, which (like Russia) was Eastern Orthodox in religion and Slavic in culture. Russia's main ally from the 1890s was France, which desired Russian size and power to counter the increasingly powerful German Empire (founded in 1871); followed by Britain in the Anglo-Russian Convention (1907). Russia expanded influence in East Asia during this time as did other Western powers and Japan, joining to suppress the Boxer Rebellion, acquiring concessions in China and invading Manchuria. In 1904-1905 the massive Russo-Japanese War was fought in Chinese territory.

Russia entered World War I in 1914 against Germany, Austria and the Ottoman Empire to defend the Kingdom of Serbia, and to gain access to the Mediterranean Sea at the expense of the Ottoman Empire. Financial help came from its allies Britain and France. The Russian military faltered, as did the political and economic system. Russians lost faith in the failed Emperor Nicholas II. There resulted two revolutions in 1917 which destroyed the Russian Empire and led to independence for the Baltic states, Finland, Poland and (briefly) Ukraine and a host of smaller nation-states such as Georgia. After sharp fighting in the Russian Civil War of 1917–1922 with international involvement, a new regime of Communism under Lenin secured control and established the Soviet Union (USSR) in 1922. For the following period of Russian foreign relations see Foreign relations of the Soviet Union.

== Strategy ==
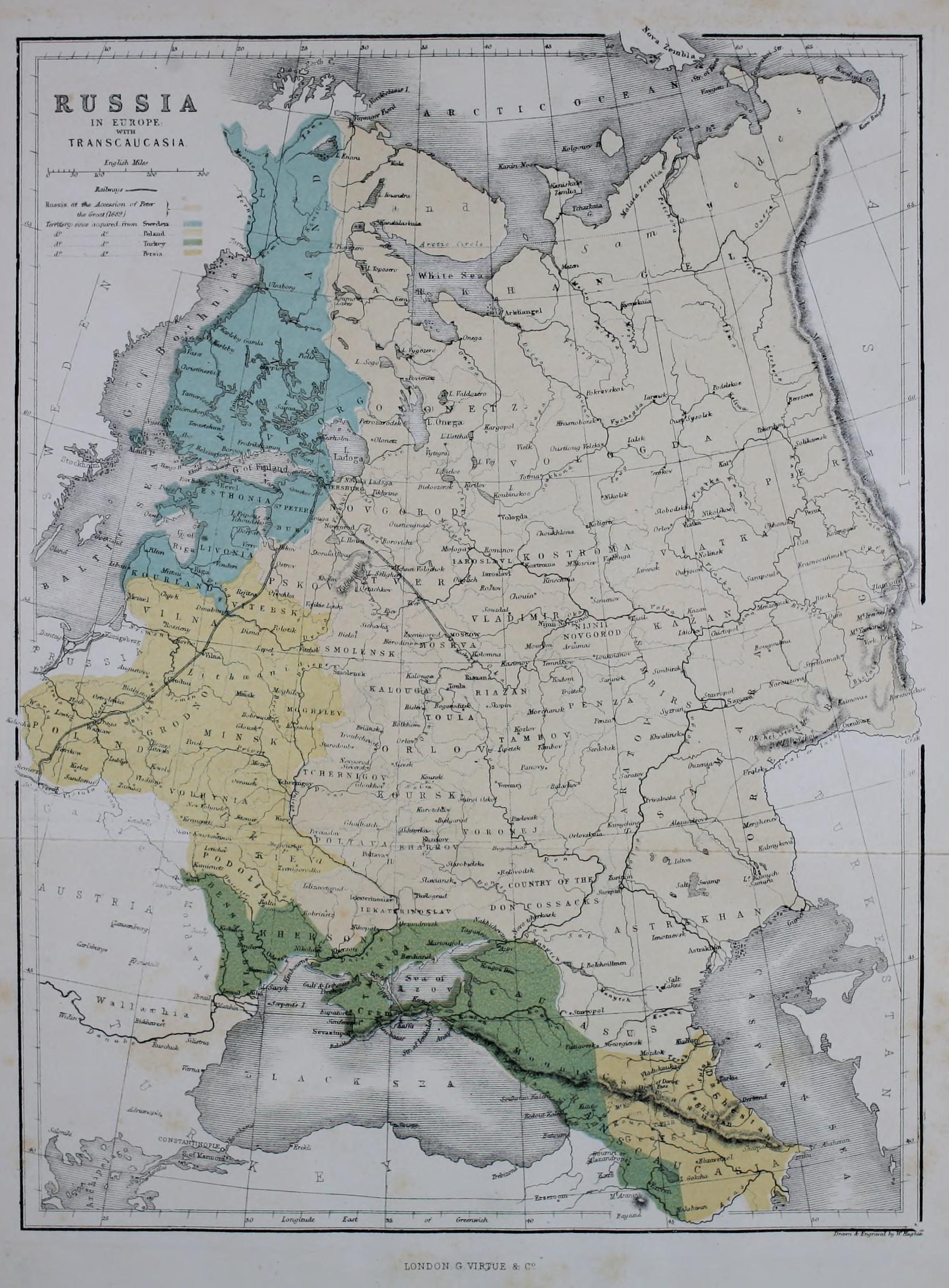
Territories conquered by the Russian Empire in the wars against Sweden, Polish-Lithuanian Commonwealth, Ottoman Empire and Persia

Geographical expansion by warfare and treaty was the central strategy of Russian foreign policy from the small Muscovite state of the 16th century to World War I in 1914. The goals were territory, warm water ports, and protection of Orthodox Christianity. The main weapon was the very large and increasingly well-trained Imperial Russian Army, although the domestic economy was hard-pressed to provide adequate support. Although there were occasional defeats and setbacks, the record was generally successful down to the 1900s.

=== West: Poland and the Baltic ===
To the northwest, Russia engaged in a century long struggle against Sweden for control of the Baltic Sea. The Empire succeeded by the 1720s, obtaining not just access to the sea but ownership of Finland and the Baltic states of Latvia, Lithuania, and Estonia. To the west, there were a series of wars with Poland and Lithuania, followed by negotiated settlements with Prussia and Austria that gave Russia control of most of Ukraine, and a large slice of Poland. Napoleon unsuccessfully challenged the Russians directly with his 1812 invasion of Russia. Russia seized more territory and became a great power, with a strong voice in the affairs of Europe from 1814 to the 1840s.

=== South: Ottomans and the Caucasus ===
To the south, the conflict with the Ottoman Empire lasted for centuries. Russia sliced away territories previously held by the Ottomans, such as the Crimea, and became a political, powerful protector of Orthodox Christians in the Balkans, and also of Christians in Transcaucasia. The greatest defeat in the history of Russian expansion came in the Crimean War (1854–1856), as the British and French defended the integrity of the Ottoman Empire from clients. However, the tsars largely recovered their losses by 1870.

=== Central Asia ===
To the southeast, Russia seized power in large swaths of territory in Central Asia inhabited by Muslims of Turkic ethnicity. Although some Russian settlers were sent into Kazakhstan, generally leading local elites were left in power as long as it was clear that Russia controlled foreign and military policies. The mainstream of expansion finally reached Afghanistan in the middle of the 19th century, leading to the Great Game with repeated wars against the Afghan tribes, and increasingly involved threats and counterthreats with the British, who were determined to protect their large holdings on the Indian subcontinent.

=== Far East: China and Japan ===
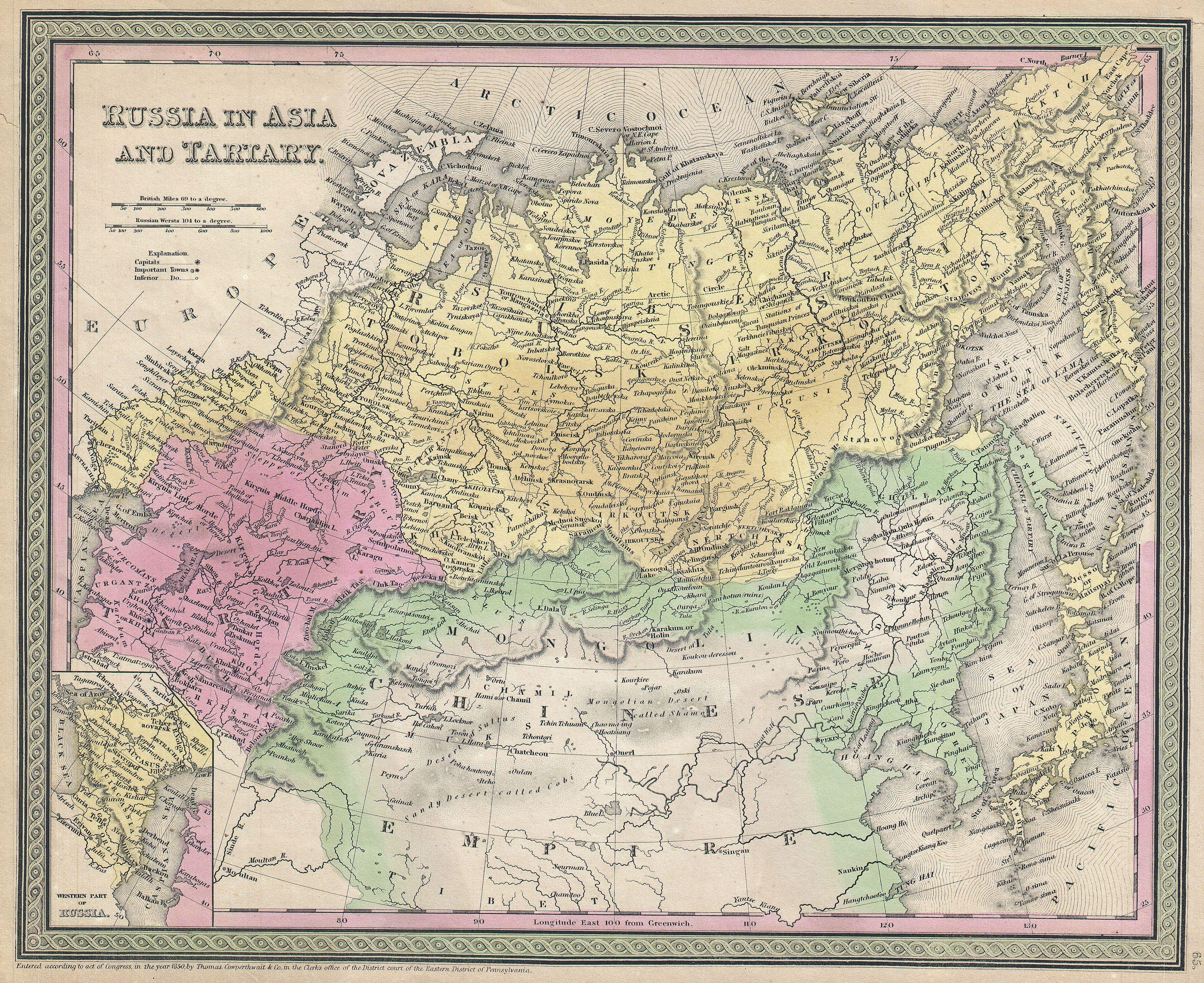
Mitchell Map of Russia in Far East 1853

Finally, there was expansion to the Far East, as Russian settlers moved into the mining and agricultural districts of Siberia, taking control of local tribes and building towns, mines, prison camps along the Trans-Siberian Railway. The total Siberian population was only a half-million in 1800, but reached 9 million in 1914, of whom 1 million were criminals and political exiles.

To build up a presence on the Pacific Ocean, Russia seized some 400,000 square miles of almost uninhabited territory from Qing dynasty China in 1858–1860. It sent in settlers and prisoners, so that its holdings from Vladivostok north along the Sea of Japan reached 310,000 in 1897. Russia established an economic role east into the Sinkiang and Manchuria regions of China peacefully, using the Treaty of Saint Petersburg (1881), loans to the Chinese government, networks of merchants, and by building the Chinese Eastern Railway, a branch of the Trans-Siberian railroad, through Manchuria to the ocean. Meanwhile, in the late 19th century, the Empire of Japan was expanding into Manchuria and especially Korea. It proposed a deal whereby the Russians would have the predominant role in Manchuria, and Japan in Korea. The tsar, contemptuous of the Japanese, bluntly refused. In the Russo-Japanese War, Japan attacked, pushing back the Russian army on the ground, and sinking the main Russian battle fleet. Japan took control of Korea and of the southern half of the Chinese Eastern Railway.

Russian expansion jumped to North America, with small fur-trade operations in Alaska, coupled with missionaries to the natives. By 1861 the project lost money, threatened to antagonize the Americans, and could not be defended from Britain. In the Alaska Purchase of 1867, it was sold to the United States for $7.2 million.

== Before 1793 ==
The Tsar shaped foreign policy in a way that a transition could mean an overnight radical turnabout. The most famous example came in 1762, during the Seven Years' War, where Empress Elizabeth had almost destroyed Frederick the Great of the Kingdom of Prussia. Then she suddenly died. The new Tsar Peter III was a friend of Frederick, who unexpectedly survived. He called it the "Miracle of the House of Brandenburg."

=== Relations with Sweden ===
During the Middle Ages several wars were fought between the Swedes and Russians and 11 wars have been fought between Russia and Sweden since the 15th century. In these wars superior Russian forces often outnumbered the Swedish, which however often stood their ground in battles such as those of Narva (1700) and Svensksund (1790) due to Sweden's capable military organisation.

The central theme of the 1600–1725 era was the struggle between Sweden and Russia for control of the Baltic, as well as territories around it. Russia was ultimately the winner, and Sweden lost its status as a major power. In 1610 the Swedish army marched into Moscow under the command of Jakob De la Gardie. From 1623 to 1709, Swedish policy, particularly under Gustavus Adolphus (1611–1632) and Charles XII (1697–1718), encouraged and militarily supported Ukrainian opposition to Muscovite Russian hegemony. Gustavus Adolphus fought the Ingrian War against Russia. It ended in 1617 with the Treaty of Stolbovo, which excluded Russia from the Baltic Sea. Sweden's most dramatic defeat on the battleground came in 1709 at the battle of Poltava, in an attempt to second the Ukrainian rebellion leader Mazepa.

=== Peter the Great ===
Peter the Great (1672–1725) took control of Russia in 1695. He greatly expanded the size of Russia while gaining access to ports on the Baltic, Black, and Caspian seas. His Russian commanders were generals Aleksandr Danilovich Menshikov and Boris Sheremetev. Before Peter, Russia was largely isolated from European affairs in terms not just of military but of economic and cultural relationships. The mysterious far-off Eastern land was held in low regard. Peter saw the urgent need for access to the Baltic Sea, and formed coalitions to challenge Swedish dominance there. His success transformed Russia's role and made it a player in European affairs.

In 1695 Peter attacked the Turkish forces that controlled the River Don. He failed because he lacked a navy or competent engineers to conduct a siege, and had no unity of command in his forces. He quickly remedied the defects and captured Azov in 1696. In 1697 he went to Western Europe to study the latest methods of warfare. On his return in 1698 he commenced reforming the country, turning the Russian tsardom into a modernized empire by copying models from Western Europe with the goal of creating a strong, professional army and navy, as well as a strong economic base. At first he relied on hired officers, especially Germans. He soon built a network of military schools in Russia to produce fresh leadership. His favorite enterprise was building a modern fleet of the sort Russia had never known.

In 1700 Peter launched the Great Northern War with a triple alliance of Denmark–Norway, Saxony and Poland–Lithuania. They struck a threefold attack on the Swedish protectorate of Swedish Holstein-Gottorp and the provinces of Livonia and Ingria. Charles won multiple victories despite being outnumbered. He defeated a much larger Russian army in 1700 at the Battle of Narva. In 1706 Swedish forces under general Carl Gustav Rehnskiöld defeated the combined army of Saxony and Russia at the Battle of Fraustadt. Russia was now the sole remaining hostile power.

Charles' subsequent march on Moscow met with initial success as victory followed victory, the most significant of which was the Battle of Holowczyn where the smaller Swedish army routed a Russian army twice its size. The campaign ended with disaster, though, when the Swedish army suffered heavy losses to a Russian force more than twice its size at Poltava, followed by the Surrender at Perevolochna. Charles spent years in futile attempts to restore Swedish power; Russia was now dominant in the Baltic.

=== Relations with Britain, 1553–1792 ===
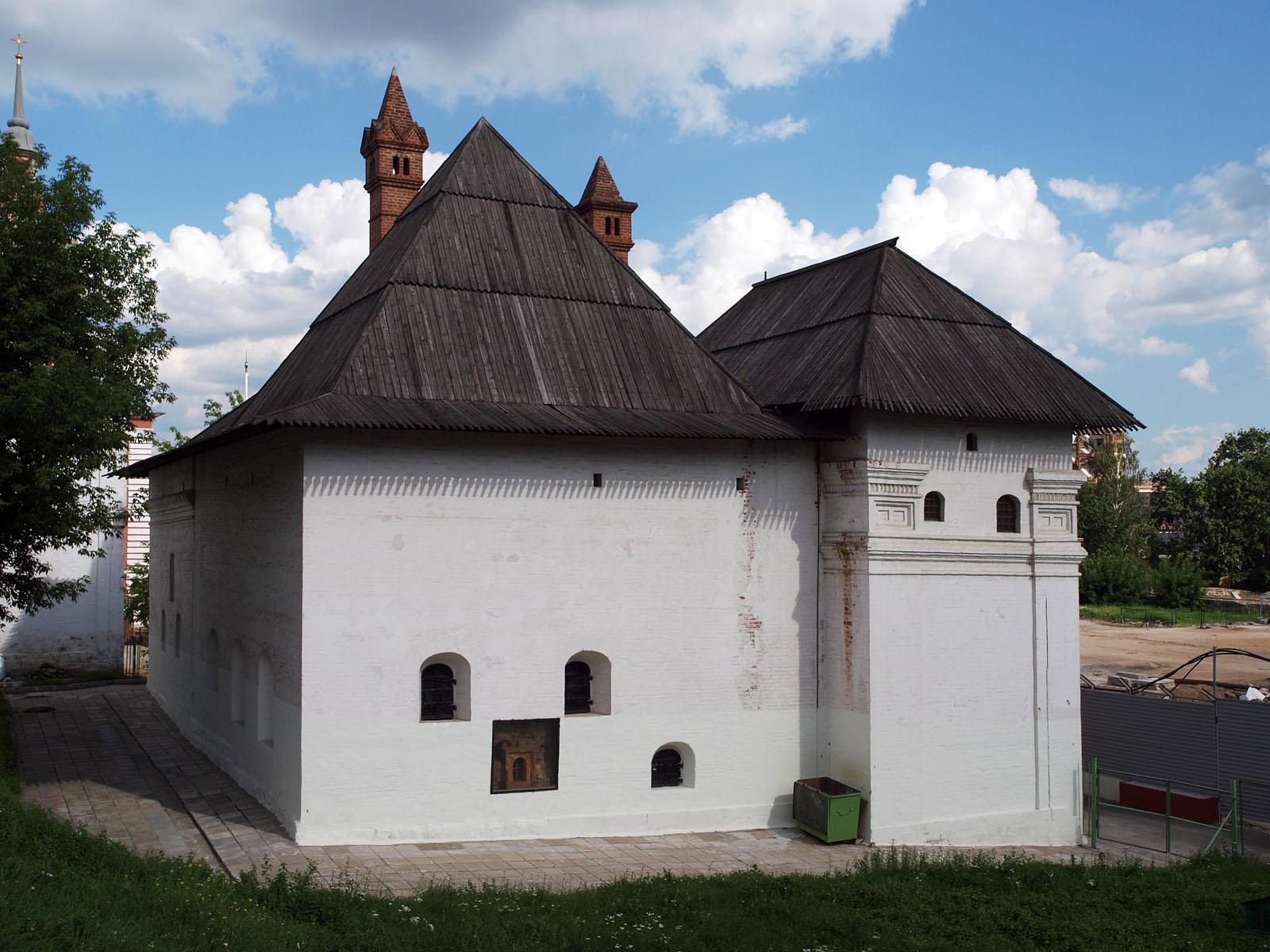
Old English Court in Moscow – headquarters of the Muscovy Company and residence of English ambassadors in the 17th century

The Kingdom of England and Tsardom of Russia established relations in 1553 when English navigator Richard Chancellor arrived in Arkhangelsk, when Ivan the Terrible ruled Russia. In 1555 the Muscovy Company was established. The Muscovy Company held a monopoly over trade between England and Russia until 1698.

From the 1720s Peter invited British engineers to Saint Petersburg, leading to the establishment of a small but commercially influential Anglo-Russian expatriate merchant community from 1730 to 1921. During the series of general European wars of the 18th century, the two empires found themselves as sometime allies and sometime enemies. The two states fought on the same side during War of the Austrian Succession (1740–1748). They were on opposite sides during Seven Years' War (1756–1763), although they did not at any time engage in the field.

==== Ochakov issue ====
Prime Minister William Pitt the Younger was alarmed at Russian expansion in Crimea in the 1780s at the expense of his Ottoman ally. He tried to get Parliamentary support for reversing it. In peace talks with the Ottomans, Russia refused to return the key Ochakov fortress. Pitt wanted to threaten military retaliation. However Russia's ambassador Semyon Vorontsov organized Pitt's enemies and launched a public opinion campaign. Pitt won the vote so narrowly that he gave up and Vorontsov secured a renewal of the commercial treaty between Britain and Russia.

== Napoleonic era: 1793–1815 ==
In foreign policy, tsar Alexander I changed Russia's position relative to France four times between 1804 and 1812 among neutrality, opposition, and alliance. In 1805 he joined Britain in the War of the Third Coalition against Napoleon. After the massive defeat of the Russian and Austrian armies by Napoleon at the Battle of Austerlitz in 1805, Russian official propaganda blamed the Austrians and stressed the moral superiority of tsar Alexander I. He switched sides and formed an alliance with Napoleon by the Treaty of Tilsit (1807) and joined Napoleon's Continental System of economic boycotts against Britain. He and Napoleon could never agree, especially about Poland, and the alliance collapsed by 1810. The tsar's greatest triumph came in 1812 as Napoleon's invasion of Russia proved a total disaster for the French. The initiative swung toward the Allies. Russian armies joined the others in pushing the French all the way back, seizing Paris, and forcing Napoleon to abdicate in 1814.

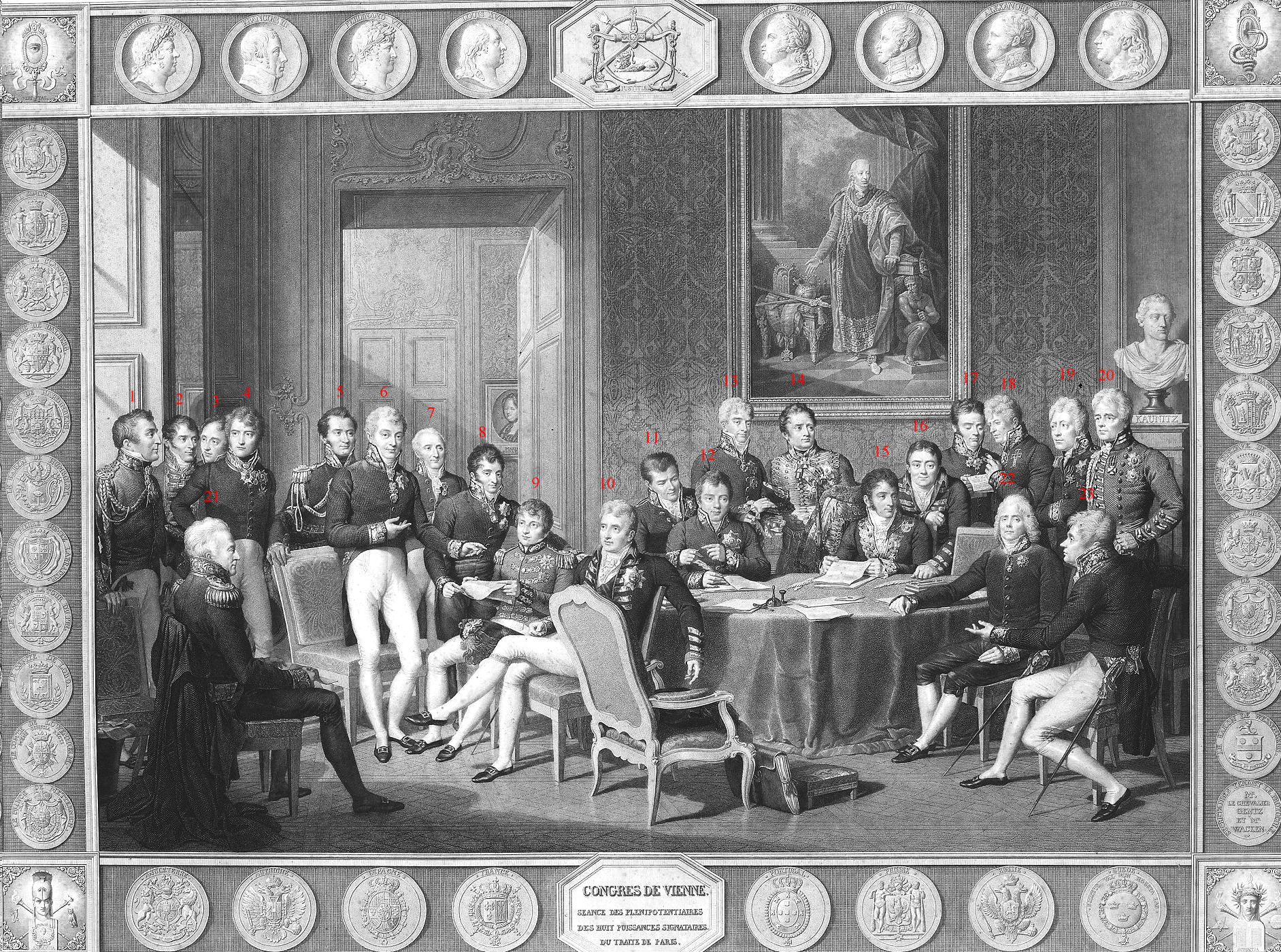
Congress of Vienna, 1814

As part of the winning coalition against Napoleon Russia gained some spoils in Finland and Poland at the Congress of Vienna in 1814–1815. The tsar attended and was deeply involved in the diplomatic wrangling over the fates of Poland, Saxony and the Kingdom of Naples. He helped establish alliances that defeated Napoleon's attempt to regain power in 1815 and helped foster a spirit of cooperation among the conservative leaders of Britain, France, Austria, and Prussia. The major territorial gain was control of Poland, which Napoleon had made an independent state. The tsar became king of Poland and (at first) allowed it considerable autonomy.

=== Britain ===
The outbreak of the French Revolution and its attendant wars temporarily united constitutionalist Britain and autocratic Russia in an ideological alliance against French republicanism. Britain and Russia attempted to halt the French but the failure of their joint invasion of the Netherlands in 1799 precipitated a change in attitudes.

The two countries were at war, with some very limited naval combat during the Anglo-Russian War (1807–1812). In 1812 Britain and Russia became allies against Napoleon in the Napoleonic Wars.

== 1815–1917 ==
After 1815, Russia strongly promoted conservatism and political reaction in Western Europe. It had all the land it wanted, so a high priority was to protect the frontiers. In practice the main issue was Poland, which had been partitioned among Russia, Germany, and Austria. A strong sense of Polish nationalism as well tensions on language and religion (Roman Catholics versus Eastern Orthodox) cause dissatisfaction in the Polish population. The Poles opened major revolts in 1830–31, and 1863–64, and were crushed by the Russian army. The Empire responded with a program of Russification. To the south and southwest, the increasing vulnerability of the Ottoman Empire led Russia to support Orthodox Christian revolts against the Ottomans in the Balkans and Greece. A major long-term goal was control of the Straits, which would allow full access to the Mediterranean. Britain, and also France, took the Ottoman side, leading to the Crimean war, 1853-56 which left Russia seriously weakened. Russia had much less difficulty in expanding to the south, including the conquest of Turkestan. However, Britain became alarmed when Russia threatened Afghanistan, with the implicit threat to India, and decades of diplomatic maneuvering finally ended with an Anglo-Russian Entente in 1907. Expansion into the vast stretches of Siberia was slow and expensive, but finally became possible with the building of the trans-Siberian Railway, 1890 to 1904. This opened up East Asia, and Russian interests focused on Mongolia, Manchuria, and Korea. China was too weak to resist, and was pulled increasingly into the Russian sphere. Japan strongly opposed Russian expansion, and defeated Russia in a war in 1904–1905. Japan took over Korea, and Manchuria remained a contested area. Meanwhile, France, looking for allies against Germany after 1871, formed a military alliance in 1894, with large-scale loans to Russia, sales of arms, and warships, as well as diplomatic support. Once Afghanistan was informally partitioned in 1907, Britain, France and Russia came increasingly close together in opposition to Germany and Austria. They formed a loose Triple Entente that played a central role in the First World War. That war broke out when the Austro-Hungarian Empire, with strong German support, tried to suppress Serbian nationalism, and Russia supported Serbia. Everyone began to mobilize, and Berlin decided to act before the others were ready to fight, first invading Belgium and France in the west, and then Russia in the east.

=== Nicholas I, 1825–1855 ===
After 1815 Russia formed the Holy Alliance to suppress revolutionary movements in Europe that it saw as immoral threats to legitimate Christian monarchs. Russia under Emperor Nicholas I helped Austria's Klemens von Metternich in suppressing national and liberal movements. The most important intervention came when the Russian army played a decisive role in crushing the revolution in Hungary in 1849.

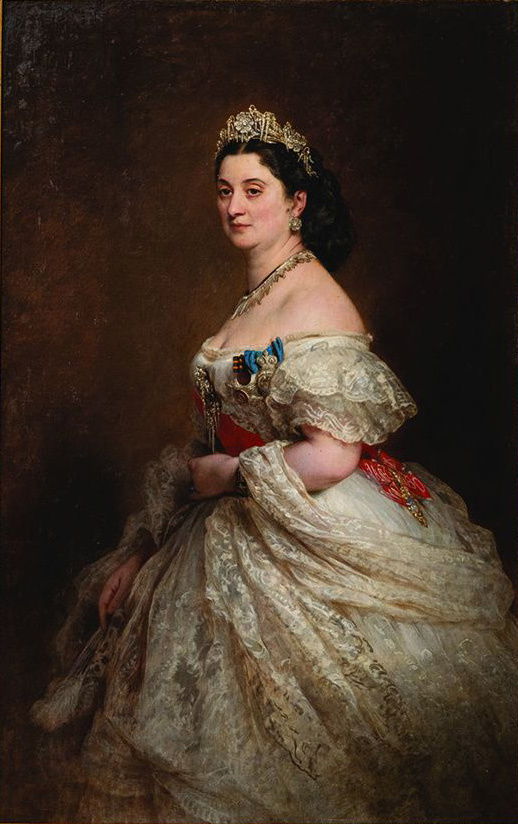
Georgian Princess Ekaterine Dadiani sought Russian protection against the Turkish threat and peasant uprisings, but inadvertently paved the way to the full annexation of her principality by the Russian Empire.

Nicholas I, who ruled 1825–1855, was among the most reactionary of all Russian leaders. His aggressive foreign policy involved many expensive wars that had a disastrous effect on the empire's finances. He was successful against Russia's neighbouring southern rivals as he seized the last territories in the Caucasus held by Persia (comprising modern day Armenia and Azerbaijan) by successfully ending the Russo-Persian War (1826–28). By now, Russia had gained what is now Dagestan, Georgia, Azerbaijan and Armenia from Persia, and had therefore at last gained the clear upper hand in the Caucasus, both geo-politically as well as territorially. He ended the Russo-Turkish War (1828–29) successfully as well. Later on, however, he led Russia into the Crimean War (1853–56) with disastrous results. Historians emphasize that his micromanagement of the armies hindered his generals, as did his misguided strategy. William Fuller notes that historians have frequently concluded that "the reign of Nicholas I was a catastrophic failure in both domestic and foreign policy." At his death in 1855, the Russian Empire reached its geographical zenith, spanning over 20 million square kilometers (7.7 million square miles), but in desperate need of reform.

=== Crimean War 1853–1856 ===
The immediate cause of the Crimean War involved the rights of Christian minorities in the Holy Land, which was a part of the Ottoman Empire. France promoted the rights of Roman Catholics, while Russia promoted those of the Eastern Orthodox Church. The longer-term causes involved the decline of the Ottoman Empire and the unwillingness of Britain and France to allow Russia to gain territory and power at Ottoman expense. The war was fought largely on the Crimean peninsula, and involved very large numbers of casualties, especially from disease. British-French naval superiority proved decisive and the war ended when the allies destroyed Sebastopol. Russia was forced to make concessions, but it eventually regained them and continued to threaten the Ottoman Empire.

For much of Nicholas's reign, Russia was seen as a major military power, with considerable strength. At last the Crimean war at the end of his reign demonstrated to the world what no one had previously realized: Russia was militarily weak, technologically backward, and administratively incompetent. Despite his grand ambitions toward the south and Turkey, Russia had not built its railroad network in that direction, and communications were bad. The bureaucracy was riddled with graft, corruption and inefficiency and was unprepared for war. The Navy was weak and technologically backward; the Army, although very large, was good only for parades, suffered from colonels who pocketed their men's pay, poor morale, and was even more out of touch with the latest technology as developed by Britain and France. By war's end, the Russian leadership was determined to reform the Army and the society. As Fuller notes, "Russia had been beaten on the Crimean peninsula, and the military feared that it would inevitably be beaten again unless steps were taken to surmount its military weakness." The Treaty of Paris (1856) was a peace treaty that took advantage of Russia's weakness by weakening it further in humiliating fashion. It gave West European powers the nominal duty of protecting Christians living in the Ottoman Empire, removing that role from Russia, which had been designated as such a protector in the 1774 Treaty of Kuchuk-Kainarji. The harshest clauses demanded the full demilitarisation of the Black Sea—most of Russia's most important naval facilities could no longer be used to threaten or to defend. Russia became almost powerless in both the Black Sea and the Mediterranean.

=== Foreign affairs after the Crimean War ===
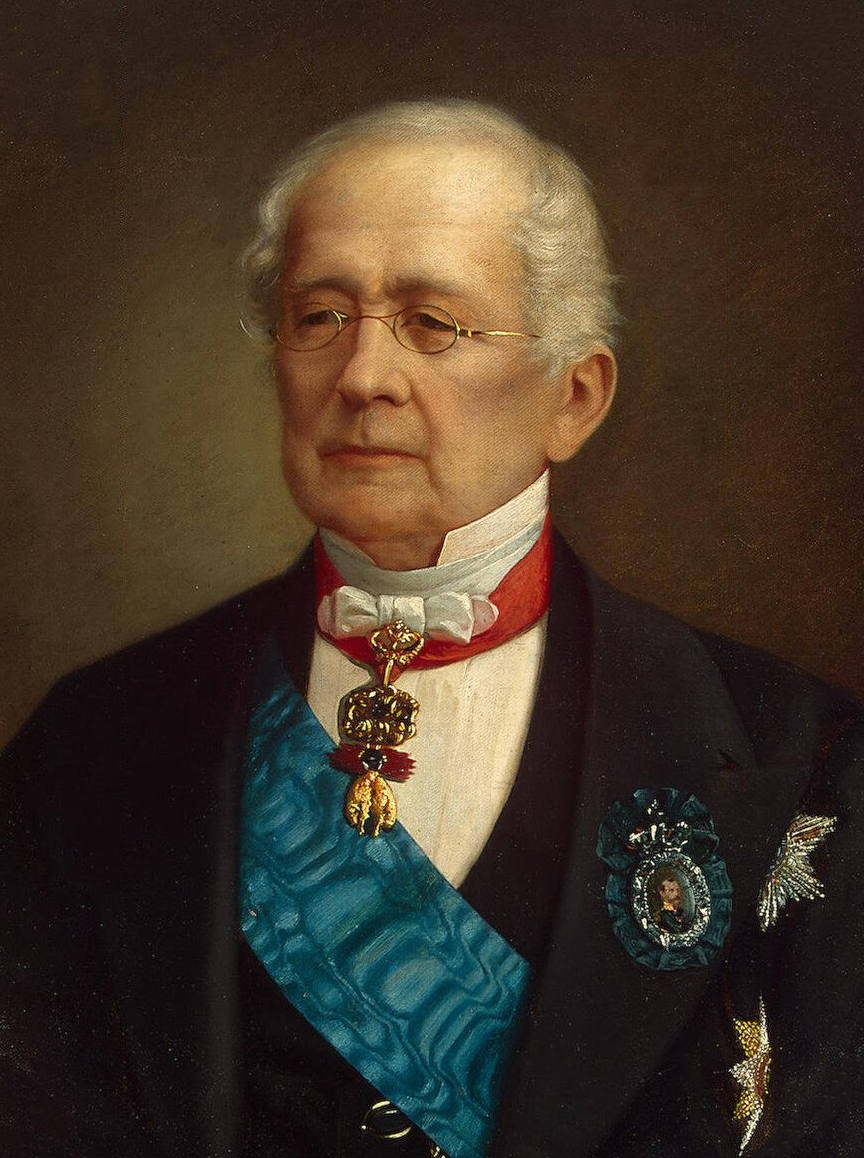
Prince Gorchakov, foreign minister 1856-1882

Tsar Nicholas I died during the war and was succeeded by Tsar Alexander II. He gave Prince Gorchakov full control of foreign policy. The new policy was to keep a low profile in Europe while rebuilding the military and reforming the domestic economy. Gorchakov pursued cautious and well-calculated policies. A high priority was regaining naval access to the Black Sea. The policy concentrated on good relations with France, Prussia, and the United States. Russian statesmen achieved the goal by 1870 despite opposition from Britain and Austria-Hungary.

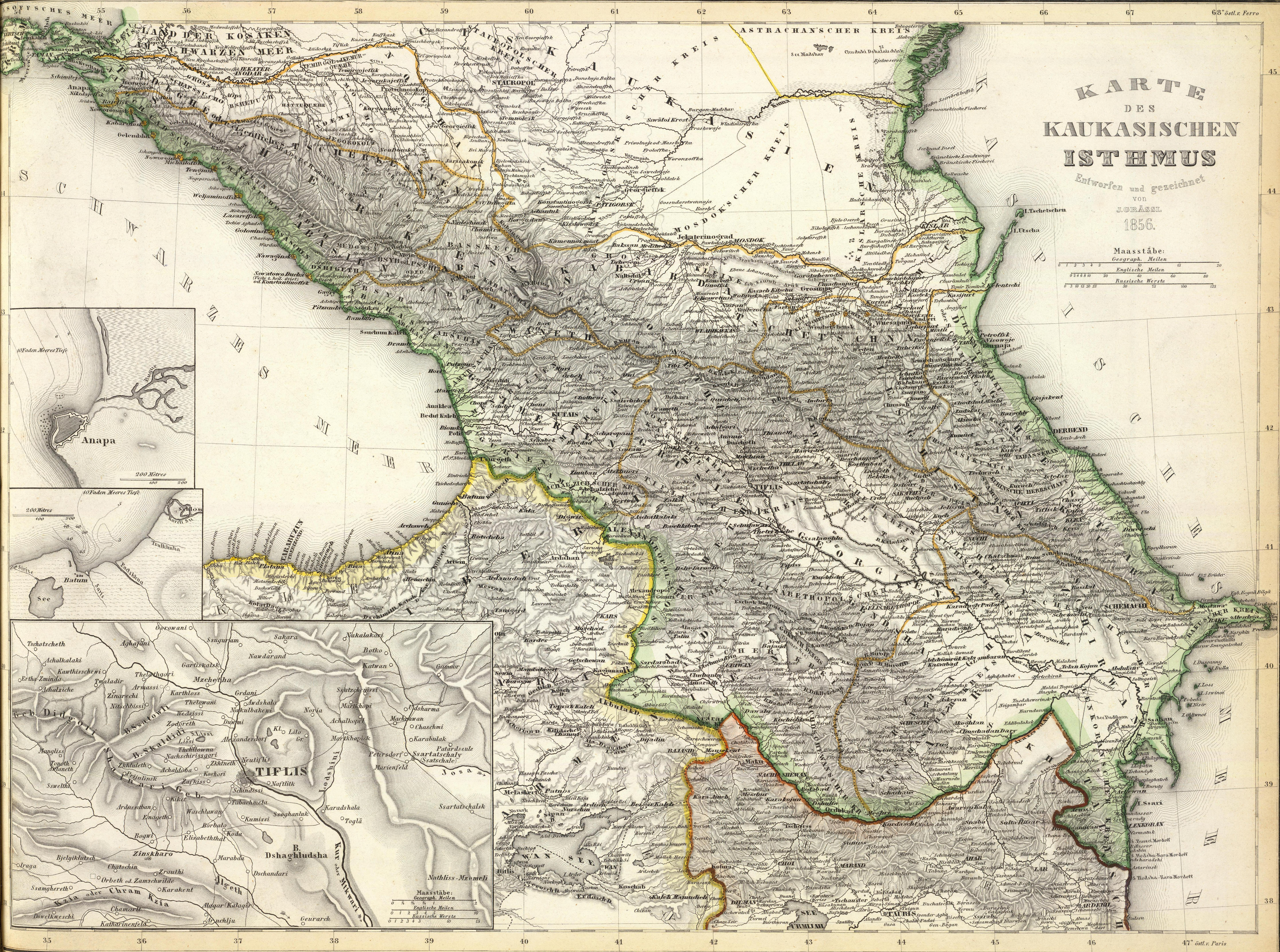
Caucasian East. Map drawn in 1856 by J. Grassl (includes Tiflis and his entourage).

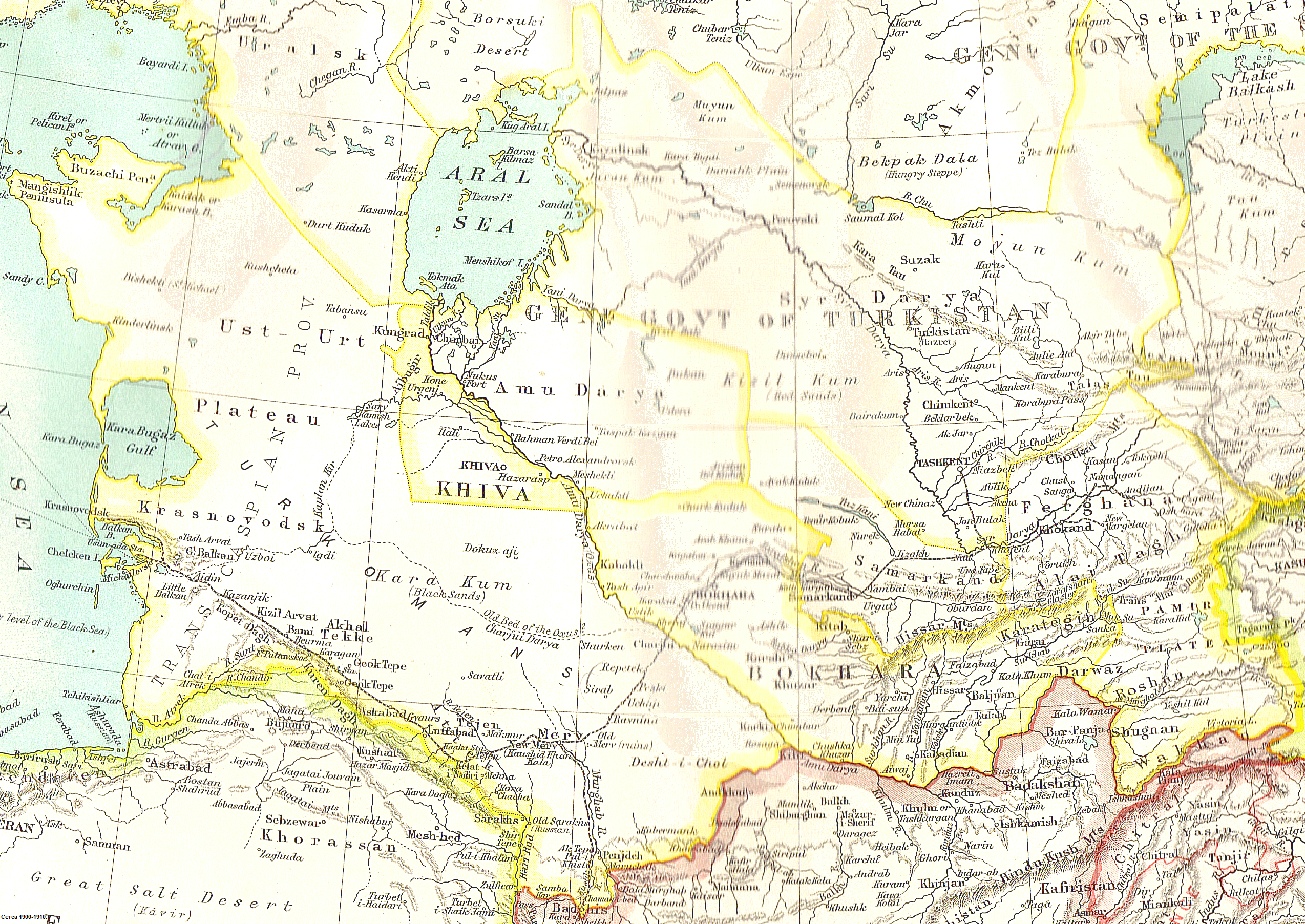
The borders of the Russian imperial territories of Khiva and Bukhara in the time period of 1902–1903.

Russia turned its expansionist plans to the south and east. Russian troops first moved to gain control of the Caucasus region, where the revolts of Muslim tribesmen—Chechens, Circassians, and Dagestanis—had continued despite numerous Russian campaigns in the nineteenth century. Once the forces of Aleksandr Baryatinsky had captured the legendary Chechen rebel leader Shamil in 1859, the army resumed the expansion into Central Asia that had begun under Nicholas I. The capture of Tashkent was a significant victory over the Kokand Khanate, part of which was annexed in 1866. By 1867 Russian forces had captured enough territory to form the Guberniya (Governorate General) of Turkestan, the capital of which was Tashkent. The Bukhara Khanate then lost the crucial Samarkand area to Russian forces in 1868. To avoid alarming Britain, which had strong interests in protecting nearby India, Russia left the Bukhoran territories directly bordering Afghanistan and Persia nominally independent. The Central Asian khanates retained a degree of autonomy until 1917.

Russia followed the United States, Britain, and France in establishing relations with Japan, and, together with Britain and France, Russia obtained concessions from China consequent to the Second Opium War (1856–1860). Under the Treaty of Aigun in 1858 and the Treaty of Beijing in 1860, China ceded to Russia extensive trading rights and regions adjacent to the Amur and Ussuri rivers and allowed Russia to begin building a port and naval base at Vladivostok.

As part of the foreign policy goals in Europe, Russia initially gave guarded support to France's anti-Austrian diplomacy. A weak Franco-Russian entente soured, however, when France backed a Polish uprising against Russian rule in 1863. Russia then aligned itself more closely with Prussia by approving the unification of Germany in exchange for a revision of the Treaty of Paris and the remilitarization of the Black Sea. These diplomatic achievements came at a London conference in 1871, following France's defeat in the Franco-Prussian War. After 1871 Germany, united under Prussian leadership, was the strongest continental power in Europe. In 1873 Germany formed the loosely knit League of the Three Emperors with Russia and Austria-Hungary to prevent them from forming an alliance with France. Nevertheless, Austro-Hungarian and Russian ambitions clashed in the Balkans, where rivalries among Slavic nationalities and anti-Ottoman sentiments seethed.

In the 1870s, Russian nationalist opinion became a serious domestic factor in its support for liberating Balkan Christians from Ottoman rule and making Bulgaria and Serbia quasi-protectorates of Russia. From 1875 to 1877, the Balkan crisis escalated with the rebellion in Bosnia and Herzegovina, and insurrection in Bulgaria, which the Ottoman Turks suppressed with such great cruelty that Serbia, but none of the West European powers, declared war. In early 1877, Russia came to the rescue of beleaguered Serbia when it went to war with the Ottoman Empire of 1877–1878. Within one year, Russian troops were nearing Constantinople, and the Ottomans surrendered. Russia's nationalist diplomats and generals persuaded Alexander II to force the Ottomans to sign the Treaty of San Stefano in March 1878, creating an enlarged, independent Bulgaria that stretched into the southwestern Balkans.

Another significant result of the 1877–78 Russo-Turkish War in Russia's favour was the acquisition from the Ottomans of the provinces of Batum, Ardahan, and Kars in the South Caucasus, which were transformed into the militarily administered regions of Batum Oblast and Kars Oblast. To replace Muslim refugees who had fled across the new frontier into Ottoman territory the Russian authorities settled large numbers of Christians from an ethnically diverse range of communities in Kars Oblast, particularly the Georgians, Caucasus Greeks, and Armenians, all of whom hoped to achieve their own regional ambitions on the back of the Russian Empire. When Britain threatened to declare war over the terms of the Treaty of San Stefano, an exhausted Russia backed down. At the Congress of Berlin in July 1878, Russia agreed to the creation of a smaller Bulgaria. Russian nationalists were furious with Austria-Hungary and Germany for failing to back Russia, but the tsar accepted a revived and strengthened League of the Three Emperors as well as Austro-Hungarian hegemony in the western Balkans.

Russian diplomatic and military interests subsequently re-focussed on Central Asia, where Russia had quelled a series of uprisings in the 1870s, and Russia incorporated hitherto independent emirates into the empire. Britain renewed its concerns in 1881 when Russian troops occupied Turkmen lands on the Persian and Afghan borders, but Germany lent diplomatic support to Russian advances, and an Anglo-Russian war was averted.

Meanwhile, Russia's sponsorship of Bulgarian independence brought negative results as the Bulgarians, angry at Russia's continuing interference in domestic affairs, sought the support of Austria-Hungary. In the dispute that arose between Austria-Hungary and Russia, Germany took a firm position toward Russia while mollifying the tsar with a bilateral defensive alliance, the Reinsurance Treaty of 1887 between Germany and Russia.

Within a year, Russo-German acrimony led to Otto von Bismarck's forbidding further loans to Russia, and France replaced Germany as Russia's financier. When Wilhelm II dismissed Bismarck in 1890, the loose Russo-Prussian entente collapsed after having lasted for more than twenty-five years. Three years later, Russia allied itself with France by entering into a joint military convention, which matched the dual alliance formed in 1879 by Germany and Austria-Hungary.

=== Relations with Britain ===
==== Russophobia ====
Segments of the British elite turned increasingly hostile towards Russia, with a high degree of anxiety for the safety of India, fearful that Russia would push south through Afghanistan. In addition, there was a growing concern that Russia would destabilize Eastern Europe via the faltering Ottoman Empire. This made the Eastern Question a priority. Russia was especially interested in acquiring warm water ports that would enable its navy to operate year-round. Maintaining G access out of the Black Sea into the Mediterranean was paramount, which meant access through the Turkish Straits.

Russia eventually intervened on behalf of the Greeks in the Greek War of Independence (1821–1829); the London peace treaty established an independent Greece but heightened Russophobia in Britain and France. In 1851 the Great Exhibition of the Works of Industry of All Nations held in London's Crystal Palace, including over 100,000 exhibits from forty nations. It was the world's first international exposition. Russia took the opportunity to dispel growing Russophobia by refuting stereotypes of Russia as a backward, militaristic repressive tyranny. Its sumptuous exhibits of luxury products and large 'objets d'art' with little in the way of advanced technology, however, did little to change its reputation.

Russian pressure on the Ottoman Empire continued, leading Britain and France to ally with the Ottomans and push back against Russia in the Crimean War (1853–1856). Russophobia was an element in generating popular British and French support for the far-off war. Elite opinion in Britain, especially among Liberals, supported Poles against harsh Russian rule. The British government watched as Russia suppressed revolts in the 1860s but refused to intervene.

In 1874, tension lessened as Queen Victoria's second son married the only daughter of Emperor Alexander II, followed by a cordial state visit by the Emperor. The superficial goodwill lasted no more than three years, when structural forces again pushed the two nations to the verge of war.

==== The Great Game and Asian affairs ====
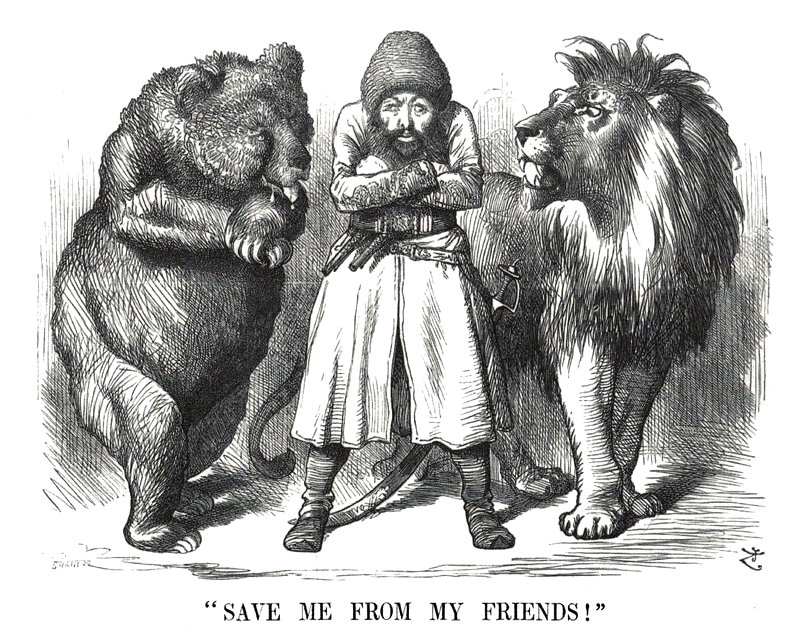
Russia depicted as a bear and Britain as a lion eying an edible Afghanistan in the Great Game.

Rivalry between Britain and Russia grew steadily over Central Asia in the Great Game of the late 19th century. Russia desired warm-water ports on the Indian Ocean while Britain wanted to prevent Russian troops from gaining a potential invasion route to India. In 1885 Russia annexed part of Afghanistan in the Panjdeh incident, which caused a war scare. However Russia's foreign minister Nikolay Girs and its ambassador to London Baron de Staal set up an agreement in 1887 which established a buffer zone in Central Asia. Russian diplomacy thereby won grudging British acceptance of its expansionism. Persia was also an arena of tension, and was divided into spheres of influence without warfare.

Russia followed the lead of the major powers in sending an occupation force to protect international subjects in China during the Boxer Rebellion (1899–1901).

=== Peaceful policies ===
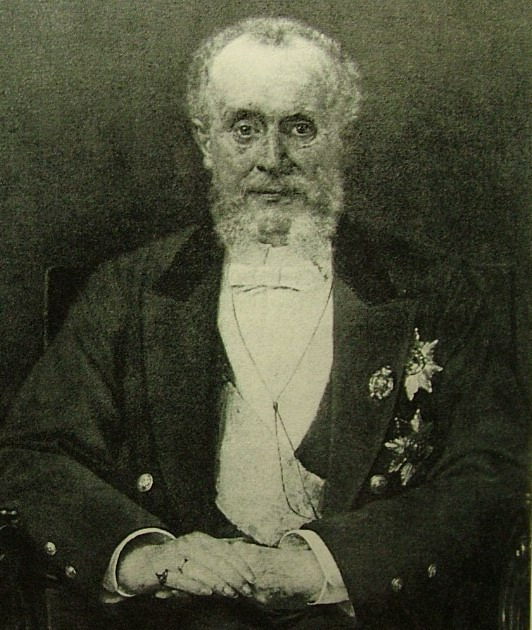
Nikolay Girs, foreign minister 1882-95

Diplomat Nikolay Girs, scion of a rich and powerful family of Scandinavian descent, served as Foreign Minister, 1882–1895, during the reign of Alexander III. He was one of the architects of the Franco-Russian Alliance of 1891, which was later expanded into the Triple Entente with the addition of Great Britain. That alliance brought France out of diplomatic isolation, and moved Russia from the German orbit to a coalition with France, that was strongly supported by French financial assistance to Russia's economic modernization. Tsar Alexander took credit for peaceful policies but according to Margaret Maxwell, historians have underrated his success in a diplomacy that featured numerous negotiated settlements, treaties and conventions. These agreements defined Russian boundaries and restored equilibrium to dangerously unstable situations. He supported numerous international commissions and made many goodwill missions, during which he repeatedly stressed Russia's peaceful intentions. His most dramatic success came in 1885, settling long-standing tensions with Great Britain, which was fearful that Russian expansion to the South would be a threat to India. Girs was usually successful in restraining the aggressive inclinations of Tsar Alexander III, convincing him that the very survival of the czarist system depended on avoiding major wars. With a deep insight into the tsar's moods and views, Girs typically shaped the final decisions by outmaneuvering hostile journalists, ministers, and even the czarina, as well as his own ambassadors. Under Giers and Alexander, Russia fought no major wars.

The 1897 agreement was part of Austria-Hungary's broader strategy under Count Agenor Gołuchowski and Baron von Beck to maintain stability in the Balkans while remaining loyal to Germany as an ally and rapprochement with Russia. It also improved Austria's international diplomatic prestige, positioning the empire as capable of mediating complex conflicts in Southeast Europe. Gołuchowski personally accompanied Emperor Franz Joseph on a visit to Saint Petersburg in April 1897, securing formal ratification of the accord.

=== War with Japan over Korea, 1904–05 ===
The Russo-Japanese War (1904–1905) was fought over rival ambitions in Manchuria and Korea. Most international observers expected Russia to win easily over upstart Japan—and were astonished when Japan sank the main Russian fleet and won the war, marking the first great Asian victory over a modern European power. Russia sought a warm-water port on the Pacific Ocean for its growing navy, and to expand maritime trade. Vladivostok was operational only during the summer, whereas Port Arthur, a naval base in Liaodong Province leased to Russia by China, was operational all year. Since the end of the First Sino-Japanese War in 1895, negotiations between Russia and Japan went nowhere. Japan was worried by Russia's long march east through Siberia and central Asia, and offered to recognize Russian dominance in Manchuria in exchange for recognition of Korea as being within the Japanese sphere of influence. Tokyo placed a much higher value on Korea than did St Petersburg, but Russia demanded Korea north of the 39th parallel to become a neutral buffer zone between Russia and Japan. While the Russian decision makers were confused, Japan worked to isolate them diplomatically, especially by signing the Anglo-Japanese Alliance in 1902, (even though it did not require Britain to enter a war.) After negotiations collapsed in 1904, the Japanese Navy opened hostilities by attacking the Russian Eastern Fleet at Port Arthur in a surprise attack. Russia suffered numerous defeats but Tsar Nicholas II was convinced that Russia would eventually win so he refused to settle. The decisive battle came in May 1905 at the Battle of Tsushima, when the main Russian battle fleet, after sailing around the world, finally arrived off Korea and was sunk in a matter of hours. Peace came with the Treaty of Portsmouth, mediated by American President Theodore Roosevelt. It was highly advantageous to Japan and transformed the balance of power in East Asia.

Britain remained strictly neutral, as allowed by its treaty with Japan. However, there was a brief war scare in October 1905 when the Russian battle fleet headed to fight Japan mistakenly engaged a number of British fishing vessels in the North Sea. The misunderstanding was quickly resolved.

Not only was Russia humiliated by its defeat at the hands of an oriental power, but there was massive unrest at home, typified by the Revolution of 1905. The response in international affairs came with two treaties in 1907 with Japan and Great Britain. The arrangement with Japan allowed southern Manchuria to be reserved as the sphere of Japanese interest, and Korea was completely under Japanese control – it was formally annexed in 1910. In exchange, Russia gained control of northern Manchuria. The city of Harbin became a major railroad and administrative center. Russian settlers were moved in, trade was built up, and mining properties were developed. The treaty with Japan also gave Russia a free hand in Outer Mongolia, although it nominally remained under Chinese ownership.

Treaty of Björkö, also known as the Treaty of Koivisto, was a secret mutual defense agreement between Germany and Russia in 1905, aimed at strengthening a Russo-German pact but it was designed to form a continental league including France strained ties against Great Britain and its Japanese allies, and it ultimately never came into effect.

The Anglo-Russian Convention of 1907 ended the long-standing rivalry in central Asia, and then enabled the two countries to outflank the Germans, who were threatening to connect Berlin in Baghdad by new railroad that would probably align the Turkish Empire with Great Britain. It ended the dispute over Persia, with Britain promising to stay out of the northern half, while Russia recognized southern Persia as part of the British sphere of influence. Russia also promised to stay out of Tibet and Afghanistan. In exchange London extended loans and some political support.

== Approach of the First World War ==
European diplomatic alignments shortly before the war. Note: Germany and the Ottoman Empire only formed an alliance shortly following the outbreak of the war.

=== Allies, 1907–1917 ===
Diplomacy became delicate in the early 20th century. Russia was troubled by the Entente Cordiale between Great Britain and France signed in 1904. Russia and France already had a mutual defense agreement that said France was obliged to threaten England with an attack if Britain declared war on Russia, while Russia was to concentrate more than 300,000 troops on the Afghan border for an incursion into India in the event that England attacked France. The solution was to bring Russia into the British-French alliance. The Anglo-Russian Entente and the Anglo-Russian Convention of 1907 made both countries part of the Triple Entente.

Russia and Japan developed friendly relations after their war ended. Developing an informal military alliance became possible because Britain, which had a military alliance with Japan, became increasingly alienated from Germany, and increasingly close to Russia. Britain and Russia resolve their outstanding difficulties by 1907. France and Japan’s contingent treaties protocol upon support and coordination with Russia. In addition, Japan and Russia had a strong interest in developing railroads in Manchuria and China, both signed secret agreements. As a result, it was easy for Japan to join Russia, France, and Britain as an ally in the First World War in 1914. Japan made significant gains in the war, seizing many of the German colonies in the Pacific and in China, while at the same time trying to reduce China itself to puppet status.

A relatively new factor influencing Russian policy was the growth of Pan-Slavic spirit that identified Russia's duty to all Slavic speaking peoples, especially those who are Orthodox in religion. The growth of this impulse shifted attention away from the Ottoman Empire, and toward the threat posed to the Slavic people by the Austro-Hungarian Empire. Serbia identified itself as the champion of the Pan-Slavic ideal; Austria vowed to destroy Serbia for that reason in 1914. Historians continue to debate how much responsibility Russia shared for the war because of its automatic support for Serbia when it was under attack by the Austro-Hungarian Empire in the July Crisis.

== See also ==
- Diplomatic history of World War I
- Foreign relations of Russia
- Foreign relations of the Soviet Union
- Great Game (1830–1907), competition with Britain for control of Central Asia
- International relations (1648–1814)
- International relations (1814–1919)
- Internationalization of the Danube River
- Military history of Russia
- Military history of the Russian Empire
- Military history of the Soviet Union
