= Peetz =

Peetz is a surname. Notable people with the surname include:

- Jake Peetz (born 1983), American football coach
- Karen Peetz (fl. from 1998), American banker

== See also ==
- Beetz
- Peetz, Colorado
- Peetz Table Wind Energy Center
