= Andrey Stepanov =

Andrey or Andrei Stepanov may refer to:

- Andrei Stepanov (diplomat) (1930–2018), Soviet and Russian diplomat
- Andrei Stepanov (footballer) (born 1979), Estonian footballer
- Andrei Stepanov (ice hockey) (born 1986), Belarusian ice hockey player for Yunost Minsk
- Andrei Stepanov (cyclist) (born 1999), Russian cyclist
