= Mikhail Alexandrovich Gorchakov =

Russian diplomat

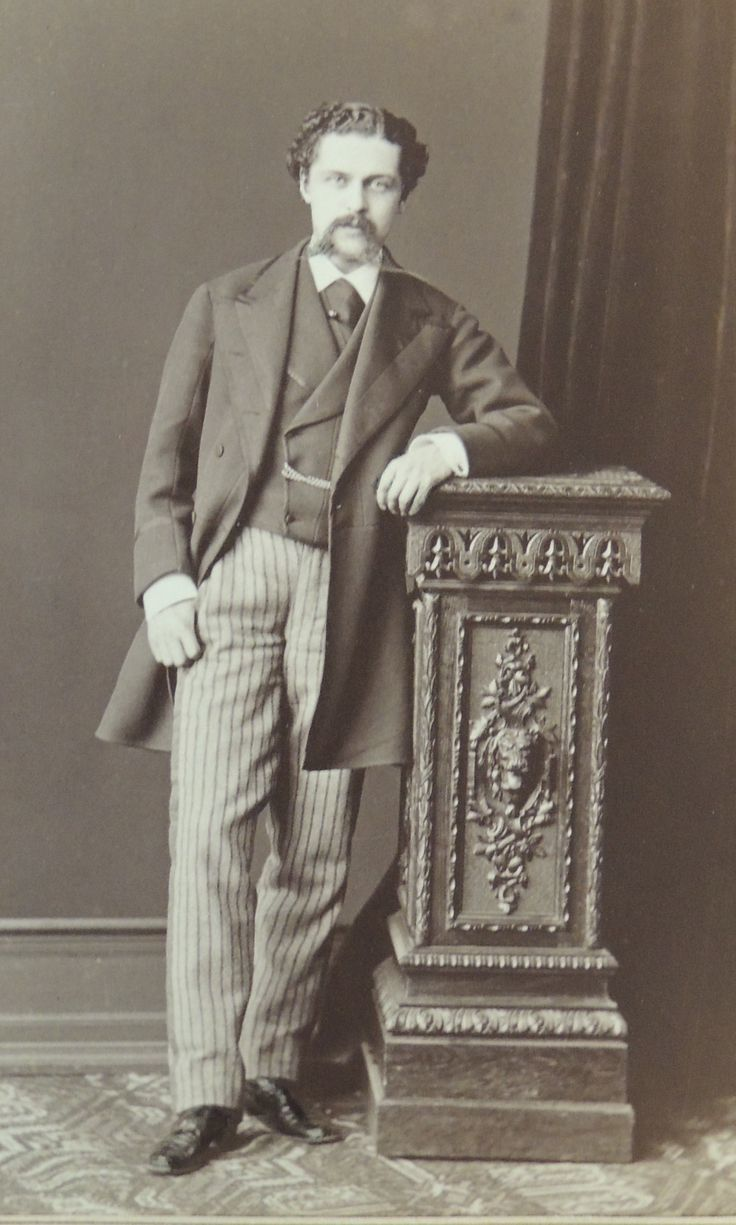
Mikhail Alexandrovich Gorchakov

Mikhail Alexandrovich Gorchakov (Russian: Михаил Александровия Горчаков; 1839–1897) was a Russian diplomat.

== Biography ==
Born into an old Russian nobility, he was the son of Prince Alexander Gorchakov, who served as Minister of Foreign Affairs, and the last Chancellor of the Russian Empire, and his wife, Princess Maria Aleksandrovna Urusova (1801–1853).

Mikhail Alexandrovich represented the Russian Empire as its ambassador in Bern, Switzerland (1872–78), in Dresden, Saxony (1878–79), and in Madrid, Spain (1879–96).

Diplomatic posts
Preceded by Nikolay Girs	Russian Ambassador in Switzerland; 1872–1878	Succeeded by Wilhelm von Kotzebue
Preceded by Wilhelm von Kotzebue	Russian Ambassador in the Kingdom of Saxony; 1878–1879	Unknown
Preceded by Christian Kudryavsky	Russian Ambassador in the Kingdom of Spain; 1879–1896	Succeeded by Dmitry Shevich
