= Beezen =

Beezen may be,

- Beezen language
- Beez von Beezen
