= List of ambassadors of Russia to Switzerland =

Ambassador of the Russian Federation to the Swiss Confederation
- Ambassade de la Fédération de Russie en Confédération suisse Botschaft der Russischen Föderation in der Schweizerischen Eidgenossenschaft
- Emblem of the Russian Foreign Ministry
- Incumbent; Sergey Garmonin since 9 December 2016
- Ministry of Foreign Affairs; Embassy of Russia in Bern
- Style: His Excellency; The Honourable
- Reports to: Minister of Foreign Affairs
- Seat: Bern
- Appointer: President of Russia
- Term length: At the pleasure of the president
- Website: Embassy of Russia in Bern

The ambassador of Russia to Switzerland is the official representative of the president and the government of the Russian Federation to the president and the government of Switzerland.

The ambassador and his staff work at large in the Russian Embassy in Bern. There is a consulate-general in Geneva. The current Russian ambassador to Switzerland is Sergey Garmonin, incumbent since 9 December 2016. Since 1995, the ambassador to Switzerland has had dual accreditation as the non-resident ambassador to Liechenstein.

== History of diplomatic relations ==
Diplomatic relations between Russia and Switzerland, and their antecedents, date back to the late seventeenth century, with the first official establishment of relations taking place on 4 February 1687 between the Tsardom of Russia and the Republic of Geneva. It was not until 19 August 1799 that the exchange of envoys were agreed, between what was by then the Russian Empire and the Helvetic Republic, a sister republic of the French First Republic. Gustav Ernst von Stackelberg was the first envoy, though he was withdrawn in 1802 and not replaced, after which time Russia was alternately allied with or at war with the First French Empire under Napoleon I. The Helvetic Republic was dissolved in the 1803 Act of Mediation, and thereafter Switzerland was closely tied with France. Following the defeat of France in the War of the Sixth Coalition, Russian minister Ioannis Kapodistrias acted as representative to Switzerland, and helped in the drafting of the Federal Treaty and in defining the position of Switzerland amongst the great powers at the Congress of Vienna. Under the terms decided at the congress, Russia became one of the guarantors of Swiss neutrality, affirmed in the 1815 Treaty of Paris.

Diplomatic envoys continued to be exchanged during this time, lasting throughout much of the First World War and after the February Revolution in 1917, when the Russian Provisional Government replaced the Imperial regime. While not immediately recognising the Bolshevik government following the October Revolution, Swiss authorities gave permission in May 1918 for a mission headed by Jan Antonovich Berzin as a diplomatic representative to maintain relations. Berzin and his mission were expelled from Switzerland in November 1918, on charges of conducting revolutionary propaganda. The final rupture occurred with the assassination of the Soviet diplomat Vatslav Vorovsky, the official representative to the Lausanne Conference, in 1923. When the assassin, Maurice Conradi, was acquitted by a Swiss jury in a controversial decision, the Soviet Union broke off diplomatic relations. Relations were not restored until shortly after the Second World War, on 18 March 1946. Anatoly Kulazhenkov was appointed as the first envoy in over twenty years. The Soviet mission to Switzerland was upgraded to an embassy on 31 December 1955, with the Swiss mission to the Soviet Union also upgraded to an embassy on 27 March 1957. With the dissolution of the Soviet Union in 1991, Switzerland was one of the first countries to recognise Russia as its successor state, and the incumbent Soviet ambassador, Zoya Novozhilova, continued to represent Russia until 1992. Since then ambassadors have continued to be exchanged between the two countries.

Diplomatic relations were established with the Principality of Liechtenstein in 1994, and the incumbent ambassador to Switzerland, Andrei Stepanov was given dual accreditation as the non-resident ambassador on 28 February 1995. The practice of the Russian ambassador to Switzerland being concurrently ambassador to Liechtenstein has continued since then.

== Representatives of Russia to Switzerland (1799–present) ==
=== Russian Empire to the Helvetic Republic (1799–1802) ===
Name	Title	Appointment	Termination	Notes
Gustav Ernst von Stackelberg	Envoy	12 August 1799	1 January 1802	

=== Russian Empire to Switzerland (1814–1917) ===
Name	Title	Appointment	Termination	Notes
Ioannis Kapodistrias	Envoy	25 January 1814	30 August 1815	Credentials presented on 22 February 1814
Paul von Krüdener	Chargé d'affaires	22 March 1815	15 July 1826	
Dmitry Severin	Chargé d'affaires before 7 April 1836; Envoy after 7 April 1836	22 August 1826	16 March 1837	
Paul von Krüdener	Envoy	16 March 1837	29 January 1858	
Camille Labensky	Envoy	22 July 1858	10 August 1858	Without accreditation
Nikolai Nikolai	Envoy	5 August 1858	7 November 1860	
Aleksandr Ozerov	Envoy	25 October 1861	1 January 1869	
Nikolay Girs	Envoy	6 January 1869	4 March 1872	
Mikhail Gorchakov	Envoy	4 March 1872	10 May 1878	
Wilhelm von Kotzebue	Envoy	10 May 1878	25 September 1879	
Andrey Gamburger	Envoy	25 September 1879	7 October 1896	
Aleksandr Ionin	Envoy	16 January 1897	21 May 1900	
Aleksandr Vestman	Envoy	24 May 1900	1902	
Valery Zhadovsky	Envoy	1902	1906	
Vasily Bakherakht	Envoy	1906	1916	
Georgy Planson	Envoy	October 1916	3 March 1917	

=== Russian Provisional Government to Switzerland (1917) ===
Name	Title	Appointment	Termination	Notes
Andrey Onu	Chargé d'affaires	1917	1917	

=== Russian Soviet Federative Socialist Republic to Switzerland (1918) ===
Name	Title	Appointment	Termination	Notes
Yan Berzin	Diplomatic representative	5 April 1918	November 1918	

=== Soviet Union to Switzerland (1946–1991) ===
Name	Title	Appointment	Termination	Notes
Anatoly Kulazhenkov	Envoy	30 April 1946	20 December 1950	Credentials presented on 16 September 1946
Fyodor Molochkov	Envoy	20 December 1950	30 March 1955	Credentials presented on 27 February 1951
Pavel Yershov	Envoy before 21 January 1956; Ambassador after 21 January 1956	30 March 1955	7 September 1957	Credentials presented as envoy on 2 June 1955; Credentials presented as ambassador on 2 March 1956
Dmitri Pozhidaev	Ambassador	7 September 1957	11 October 1958	Credentials presented on 11 October 1957
Nikolai Koryukin	Ambassador	1 January 1959	10 June 1960	Credentials presented on 20 March 1959
Joseph Kuzmin	Ambassador	10 June 1960	19 February 1963	Credentials presented on 8 July 1960
Aleksandr Loshchakov	Ambassador	19 February 1963	22 December 1965	Credentials presented on 5 April 1963
Gennady Kiselyov	Ambassador	22 December 1965	24 September 1968	Credentials presented on 7 February 1966
Anatoly Chistyakov	Ambassador	24 September 1968	29 March 1973	Credentials presented on 29 October 1968
Pavel Gerasimov	Ambassador	29 March 1973	15 October 1977	Credentials presented on 24 May 1973
Vladimir Lavrov	Ambassador	15 October 1977	22 November 1983	Credentials presented on 27 October 1977
Ivan Ippolitov	Ambassador	8 January 1984	7 July 1987	Credentials presented on 27 February 1984
Zoya Novozhilova	Ambassador	7 July 1987	25 December 1991	

=== Russian Federation to Switzerland (1991–present) ===
Name	Title	Appointment	Termination	Notes
Zoya Novozhilova	Ambassador	25 December 1991	2 March 1992	
Andrei Stepanov	Ambassador	21 September 1992	21 October 1999	
Dmitry Cherkashin	Ambassador	1 February 2001	12 September 2007	
Igor Bratchikov	Ambassador	12 September 2007	21 February 2012	
Alexander Golovin	Ambassador	21 February 2012	9 December 2016	Credentials presented on 27 March 2012
Sergey Garmonin	Ambassador	9 December 2016		Credentials presented on 12 January 2017
