= Beez's theorem =

Theorem in differential geometry

In mathematics, Beez's theorem, introduced by Richard Beez in 1875, implies that if n > 3 then in general an (n – 1)-dimensional hypersurface immersed in R^{n} cannot be deformed.
