= Alexander Gorchakov =

Russian diplomat, minister, chancellor (1798–1883)

His Serenity Prince Gorchakov L.d'H. GC
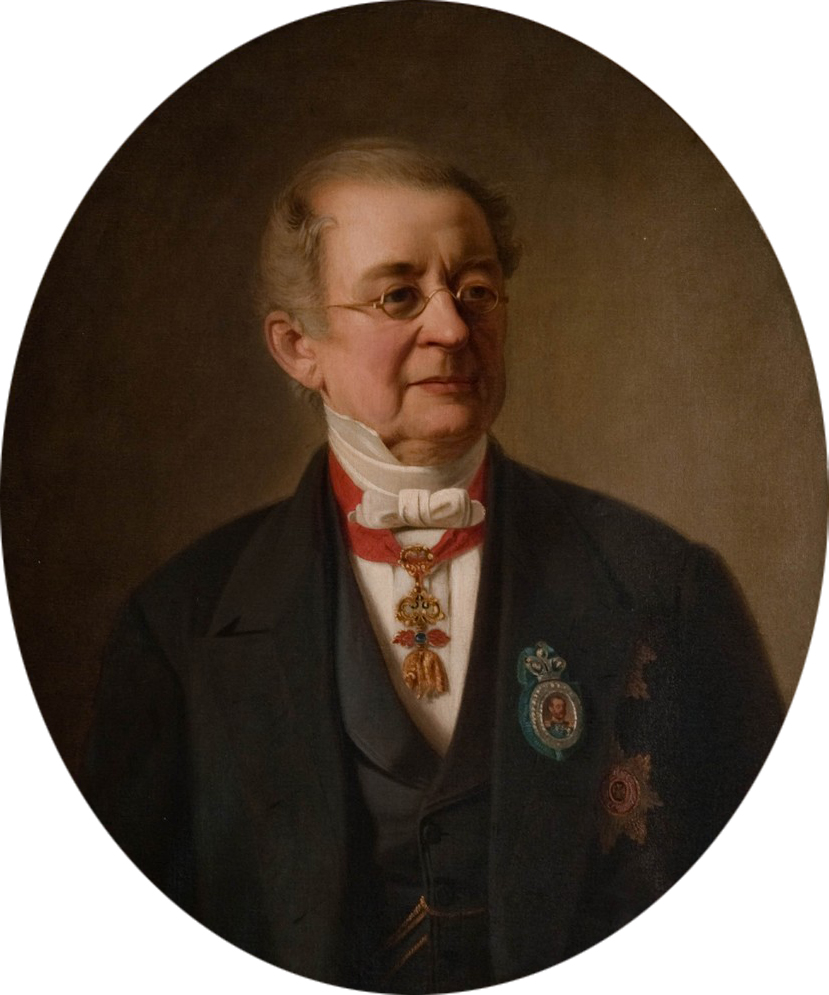
- Portrait by Johann Köler (1867)

Foreign Minister of the Russian Empire
- In office 27 April 1856 – 9 April 1882
- Preceded by: Karl Nesselrode
- Succeeded by: Nikolay Girs

Personal details
- Born: 15 June 1798 Haapsalu, Governorate of Estonia, Russian Empire
- Died: 11 March 1883 (aged 84) Baden-Baden, Grand Duchy of Baden, German Empire
- Children: Mikhail Gorchakov, Konstantin Gorchakov

Prince Alexander Mikhailovich Gorchakov (Russian: Алекса́ндр Миха́йлович Горчако́в; 15 July 1798 – 11 March 1883) was a Russian diplomat and statesman from the Gorchakov princely family. He has an enduring reputation as one of the most influential and respected diplomats of the mid-19th century. Scholars agree that the termination of the demilitarisation of the Black Sea was Gorchakov's greatest accomplishment but add that he stayed too long as foreign minister.

== Early life and career ==
Gorchakov was born at Haapsalu, Governorate of Estonia, and was educated at the Tsarskoye Selo Lyceum, where he had the poet Alexander Pushkin as a school-fellow. He became a good classical scholar, and learned to speak and write in French with facility and elegance. Pushkin in one of his poems described young Gorchakov as Fortune's favoured son, and predicted his success.

On leaving the lyceum Gorchakov entered the foreign office under Count Nesselrode. His first diplomatic work of importance was the negotiation of a marriage between the Grand Duchess Olga and the crown prince Charles of Württemberg. He remained at Stuttgart for some years as Russian minister and confidential adviser of the crown princess. He foretold the outbreak of the revolutionary spirit in Germany and Austria, and was credited with counselling the abdication of Ferdinand I of Austria in favour of Francis Joseph. When the German Confederation was re-established in 1850 in place of the Frankfurt Parliament, Gorchakov was appointed Russian minister to the diet. It was here that he first met Count Bismarck, with whom he formed a friendship which was afterwards renewed at St Petersburg.

The Emperor Nicholas found that his ambassador at Vienna, Baron Meyendorff, was not a sympathetic instrument for carrying out his schemes in the East. He therefore transferred Gorchakov to Vienna, where the latter remained through the critical period of the Crimean War. Gorchakov perceived that Russian designs against the Ottoman Empire, which was supported by Britain and France, were impracticable, and he counselled Russia to make no more useless sacrifices, but to accept the basis of a pacification. At the same time, although he attended the Paris conference of 1856, he purposely abstained from affixing his signature to the treaty of peace after that of Count Alexey Fyodorovich Orlov, Russia's chief representative. For the time, however, he made a virtue of necessity, and Alexander II, recognising the wisdom and courage which Gorchakov had exhibited, appointed him minister of foreign affairs in place of Count Nesselrode.

== Minister of foreign affairs ==
Not long after his accession to office, Gorchakov issued a circular to the foreign powers in which he announced that Russia proposed, for internal reasons, to keep herself as free as possible from complications abroad, and he added the now-historic phrase, La Russie ne boude pas; elle se recueille ('Russia is not sulking, she is composing herself'). During the January Uprising in Congress Poland, Gorchakov rebuffed the suggestions of Britain, Austria and France for assuaging the severities employed in quelling it, and he was especially acrid in his replies to Earl Russell's despatches. The Prussian support was assured by the Alvensleben Convention. In July 1863 Gorchakov was appointed Chancellor of the Russian Empire, expressly in reward for his bold diplomatic attitude towards an indignant Europe. The appointment was hailed with enthusiasm in Russia.

A rapprochement now began between the courts of Russia and Prussia, and in 1863, Gorchakov smoothed the way for the occupation of Schleswig-Holstein by German troops. That seemed equally favourable to Austria and Prussia, but it was the latter power that gained all the substantial advantages. When conflict arose between Austria and Prussia in 1866, Russia remained neutral and permitted Prussia to reap the benefits arising from the conflict and establish its supremacy in Germany.

In 1867 Russia and the United States concluded the sale of Alaska, a process which had begun as early as 1854 during the Crimean War. Gorchakov was not against the sale but always advocated for careful and secret negotiations and saw the eventuality of the sale but not the immediate necessity.

When the Franco-Prussian War of 1870–1871 broke out, Russia argued for the neutrality of Austria-Hungary. An attempt was made to form an anti-Prussian coalition, but it failed because of the cordial understanding between the German and the Russian chancellors.

In return for Russia's service in preventing Austro-Hungarian support being given to France, Gorchakov looked to Bismarck for diplomatic support on the Eastern Question, and he received an instalment of the expected support when he successfully denounced the Black Sea clauses of the Treaty of Paris (Treaty of London (1871)). That was justly regarded by him as an important service to his country and one of the triumphs of his career, and he hoped to obtain further successes with the assistance of Germany. However, the cordial relations between the cabinets of Saint Petersburg and Berlin did not last much longer.

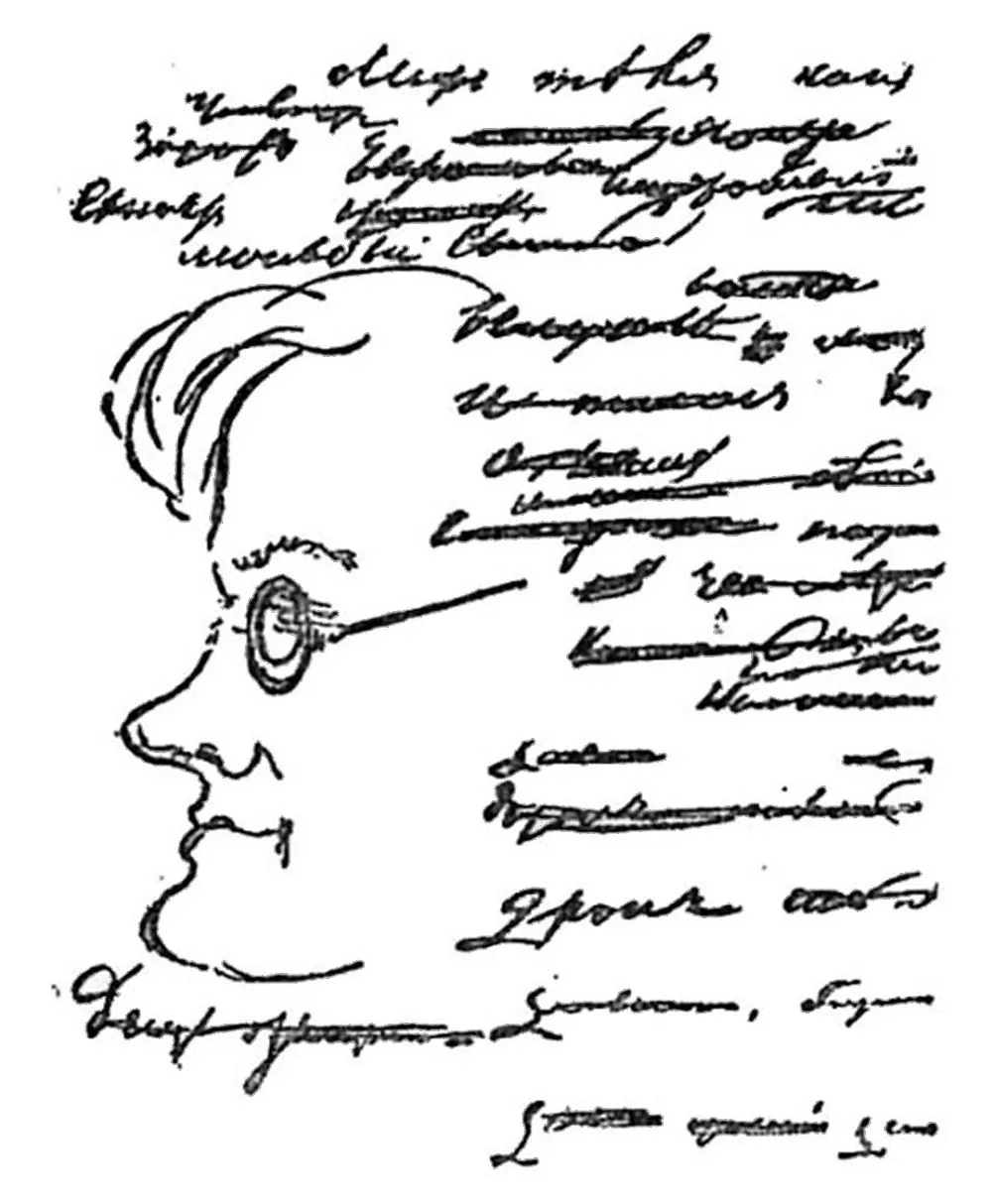
Pushkin's doodle representing Alexander Gorchakov

In 1875, Bismarck was suspected of having designs to again attack France, and Gorchakov let him know in a way that was not meant to be offensive, but roused Bismarck's indignation, that Russia would oppose any such scheme. The tension thus produced between the two statesmen was increased by the political complications of 1875–1878 in Southeastern Europe, which began with the Herzegovian insurrection and culminated at the Congress of Berlin. Gorchakov hoped to use the complications of the situation in such a way as to recover, without war, the portion of Bessarabia ceded by the Treaty of Paris, but he soon lost control of events, and the Slavophile agitation produced the Russo-Turkish War (1877-78).

The Peace of San Stefano, drafted by Gorchakov, Aleksandr Nelidov, and Nikolay Pavlovich Ignatyev, redrew Ottoman boundaries to further Russia's economic and strategic plans. A key goal was control of the port city of Batumi on the eastern shore of the Black Sea, in addition to several strategic points in the Caucasus. Most importantly, Bulgaria was greatly enlarged to serve as the dominant power in the Balkans and be under Russian control. Britain, France, Germany and Austria-Hungary objected and radically reduced Russia's gains at the Congress of Berlin (13 June to 13 July 1878). Gorchakov was honored as first plenipotentiary, but he left to the second plenipotentiary, Count Pyotr Andreyevich Shuvalov, not only the task of defending Russian interests but also the responsibility and odium for the concessions which Russia had to make to Britain and Austria-Hungary. He had the satisfaction of seeing the lost portion of Bessarabia restored to Russia but at the cost of greater sacrifices than he anticipated. On the whole Russia was humiliated again. Gorchakov considered the treaty the greatest failure of his official career. He continued to hold the post of foreign minister but lived chiefly abroad, with Dmitry Milyutin taking responsibility for foreign affairs.

== Later life ==
Gorchakov resigned formally in 1882 and was succeeded by Nicholas de Giers. He died at Baden-Baden and was buried at the family vault in Strelna Monastery.

== Assessment ==
Prince Gorchakov devoted himself mostly to foreign affairs but also took some part in the great internal reforms of Alexander II's reign: for example he submitted four projects of emancipation reform and also presented to analysis of the foreign experience of various reforms to Alexander II.

As a diplomat, he displayed many brilliant qualities: adroitness in negotiation, incisiveness in argument and elegance in style. His statesmanship, though marred occasionally by personal vanity and love of popular applause, was far-seeing and prudent. In the latter part of his career, his main object was to raise the prestige of Russia by undoing the results of the Crimean War, and it may fairly be said that he greatly succeeded.

== Honours ==
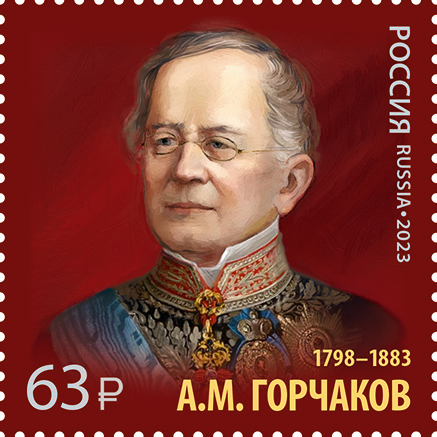
Gorchakov on a 2023 stamp of Russia

- Austrian Empire: Grand Cross of the Royal Hungarian Order of Saint Stephen, 1857; in Diamonds, 1872
- Baden: Knight of the House Order of Fidelity, 1857; in Diamonds, 1863
- Denmark:
  - Grand Cross of the Order of the Dannebrog, 8 July 1852
  - Knight of the Order of the Elephant, 16 September 1857
- Grand Duchy of Hesse: Grand Cross of the Ludwig Order, 2 July 1857
- Mexican Empire: Grand Cross of the Imperial Order of Guadalupe, 1864
- Nassau: Knight of the Order of the Gold Lion of the House of Nassau, August 1864
- Kingdom of Prussia: Knight of the Order of the Black Eagle, 24 June 1856; in Diamonds, 1859
- Kingdom of Sardinia: Knight of the Supreme Order of the Most Holy Annunciation, 30 October 1859
- Spain: Knight of the Order of the Golden Fleece, 17 February 1857
- Sweden-Norway: Knight of the Royal Order of the Seraphim, 16 May 1860
- Grand Duchy of Tuscany: Commander of the Order of Saint Joseph
- Two Sicilies: Knight of the Order of Saint Januarius, 1845
- Württemberg: Grand Cross of the Order of the Württemberg Crown, 1846

== See also ==
- Internationalization of the Danube River

== Bibliography ==
- Clark, Chester W. "Prince Gorchakov and the Black Sea Question, 1866 A Russian Bomb that did not Explode." American Historical Review (1942) 48#1: 52–60. online
- Golicz, Roman, "The Russians shall not have Constantinople: English Attitudes to Russia, 1870–1878", History Today (November 2003) 53#9 pp 39–45.
- Hauner, Milan. "Central Asian geopolitics in the last hundred years: a critical survey from Gorchakov to Gorbachev." Central Asian Survey 8.1 (1989): 1–19.
- Jelavich, Barbara. St. Petersburg and Moscow: Tsarist and Soviet Foreign Policy, 1814–1974 (1974), pp 133–91.
- Meyendorff, Alfred. "Conversations of Gorchakov with Andrássy and Bismarck in 1872." The Slavonic and East European Review 8.23 (1929): 400–408. online
- Saul, Norman E. Distant Friends: The United States and Russia, 1763–1867 (UP of Kansas, 1991).
- Seton-Watson, Hugh. The Russian Empire 1801–1917 (1967)
- Splidsboel-Hansen, Flemming. "Past and future meet: Aleksandr Gorchakov and Russian foreign policy." Europe-Asia Studies 54.3 (2002): 377–396. online
- Stevens, John Knox. "The Franco-Russian Treaty of 1859: New Light and New Thoughts." Historian 28.2 (1966): 203–223. online

Preceded by Karl Nesselrode	Foreign Minister of Russia; 1856–1882	Succeeded by Nicholas de Giers
