= Beez, Namur =

Sub-municipality of the city of Namur, Wallonia, Belgium

Beez Bê (Walloon)
- Sub-municipality of Namur
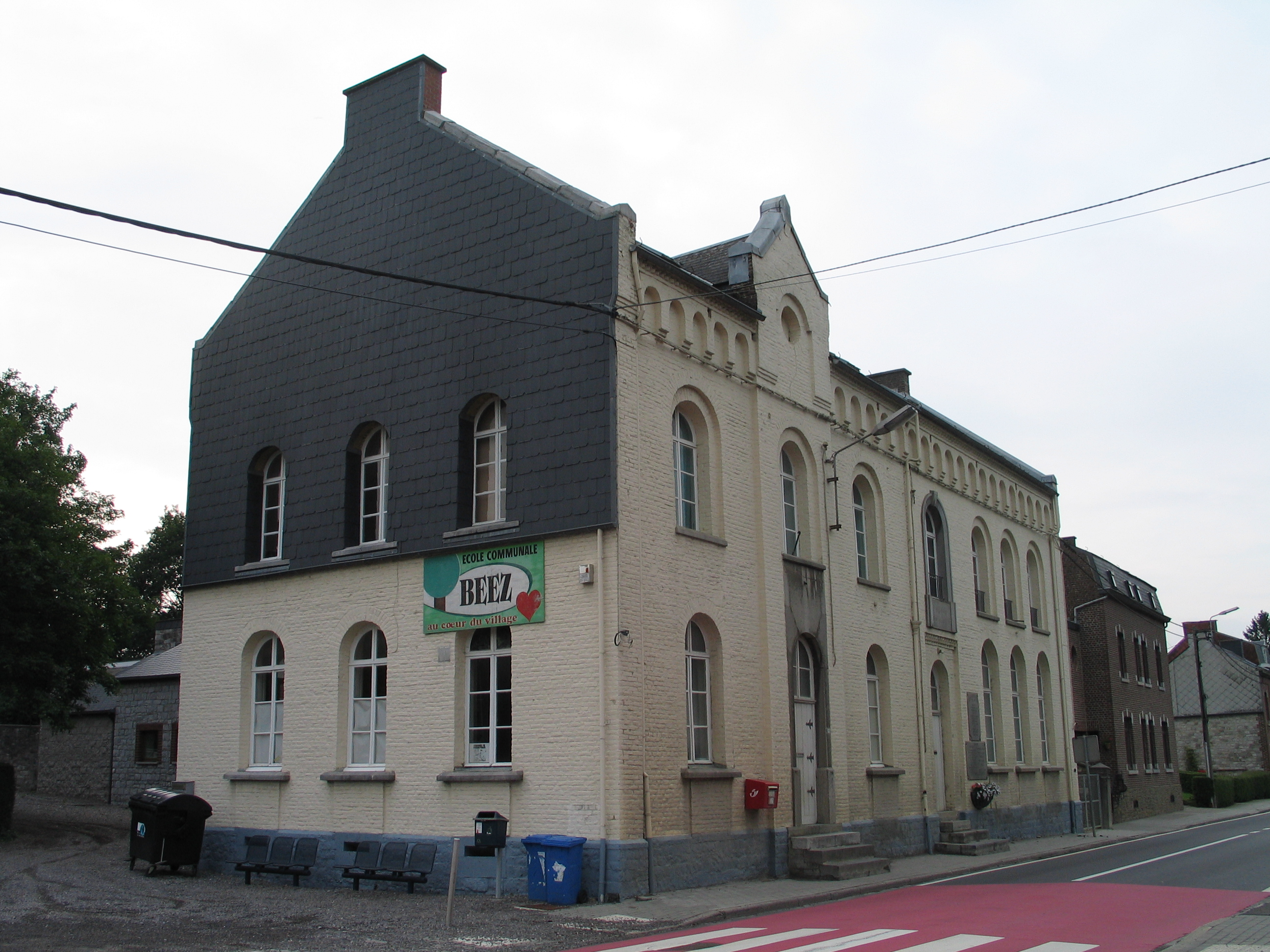
- Old Town Hall

- Location of Beez in Namur
- Interactive map of Beez
- Location within Belgium Location within Namur Province
- Coordinates: 50°28′00″N 4°55′00″E
- Country: Belgium
- Community: French Community
- Region: Wallonia
- Province: Namur
- Arrondissement: Namur
- Municipality: Namur

Area
  - Total: 3.21 km^{2} (1.24 sq mi)

Population (2020-01-01)
  - Total: 1,536
  - Density: 479/km^{2} (1,240/sq mi)
- Postal codes: 5000
- Area codes: 081

Beez (French pronunciation: [be]; Walloon: Bê) is a sub-municipality of the city of Namur located in the province of Namur, Wallonia, Belgium. It was a separate municipality until 1977. On 1 January 1977, it was merged into Namur.
