= Bez =

Bez or BEZ may refer to:

- Bez (musician) (born 1983), Nigerian musician Emmanuel Bez Idakula
- Bez (dancer) (born Mark Berry, 1964), British DJ and dancer/percussionist with the Happy Mondays
- Claude Bez (1940–1999), former Chairman of Girondins de Bordeaux FC, the leading French club in the 1980s
- Bez, character in Hanna-Barbera animated Arabian Knights TV series

== Places ==
- Le Bez, a village in France
- Bez-et-Esparon, a commune in southern France
- Bez (Drôme), a tributary to the Drôme river in France
- Bez (Midouze), a tributary to the Midouze river in France

== International codes ==
- BEZ, the IATA code for Beru Island Airport, Gilbert Islands, Kiribati
- bez, the ISO 639-3 code for the language spoken by the Bena people in Tanzania

== Other uses ==
- Bez, part of an antler

== See also ==
- Betz (disambiguation)
- Béez
