= Andrei Stepanov (diplomat) =

Russian diplomat (1930–2018)

Andrei Ivanovich Stepanov (Russian: Андрей Иванович Степанов; 13 February 1930 – 17 June 2018) was a Soviet and Russian diplomat, professor, and author.

Stepanov was born 13 February 1930 in Kaluga, Soviet Union, to Ivan Fedorovich Stepanov, and Lidiia Ivanovna Stepanova. After graduating Lomonosov Moscow State University, specializing in history, in 1953, he worked in the Higher Diplomatic School of the Soviet Ministry of Foreign Affairs. In 1956, he was sent to East Germany, first as the Soviet Vice Consul to Rostock, and later as the second secretary of the Soviet Embassy to East Germany. From 1962 to 1978 he taught at the Higher Diplomatic School, advancing from senior instructor to first prorector. He earned his Candidate of Sciences degree in history in 1958, and Doctor of Sciences in history in 1978.

In 1978 Stepanov was appointed advisor to the Soviet Embassy to Austria. In 1980, he was awarded the USSR State Prize for his collective work Foreign policy of the Soviet Union. From 1982 to 1990 he worked in senior domestic posts in the Ministry of Foreign Affairs. May 8, 1990, Stepanov was elected Rector of the Moscow State Institute of International Relations, which he held until October 17, 1992, when he was sent as the first Russian Ambassador to Switzerland (since the dissolution of the Soviet Union). From 1995 to 1999, Stepanov concurrently headed the Russian Embassy to Liechtenstein, opening Russian relations with the country. He returned to Russia in 1999, retired from active diplomatic service, and has since held the position of professor at the Diplomatic School of the Russian Ministry of Foreign Affairs.

In 2002, Stepanov wrote Unknown Liechtenstein. Through the eyes of the first Russian ambassador (Незнакомый Лихтенштейн. Глазами первого российского посла) ISBN 5-7133-1122-8. In 2006 he wrote The Russians and the Swiss: Notes of a Diplomat, covering 300 years of Russia–Switzerland relations. It was published in Moscow, by Nauchnaia Kniga.
