= Beetz =

Beetz is a surname. Notable people with the surname include:

- Christof Beetz (1670–1746), ennobled by Emperor Charles VI in Vienna
- Jean Beetz (1927–1991), Canadian lawyer, academic and judge
- Johan Beetz (1874–1949), Canadian naturalist of Belgian origin
- Wilhelm von Beetz (1822–1886), German physicist
- Zazie Beetz (born 1991), German-American actress
