= Richard Beez =

German mathematician

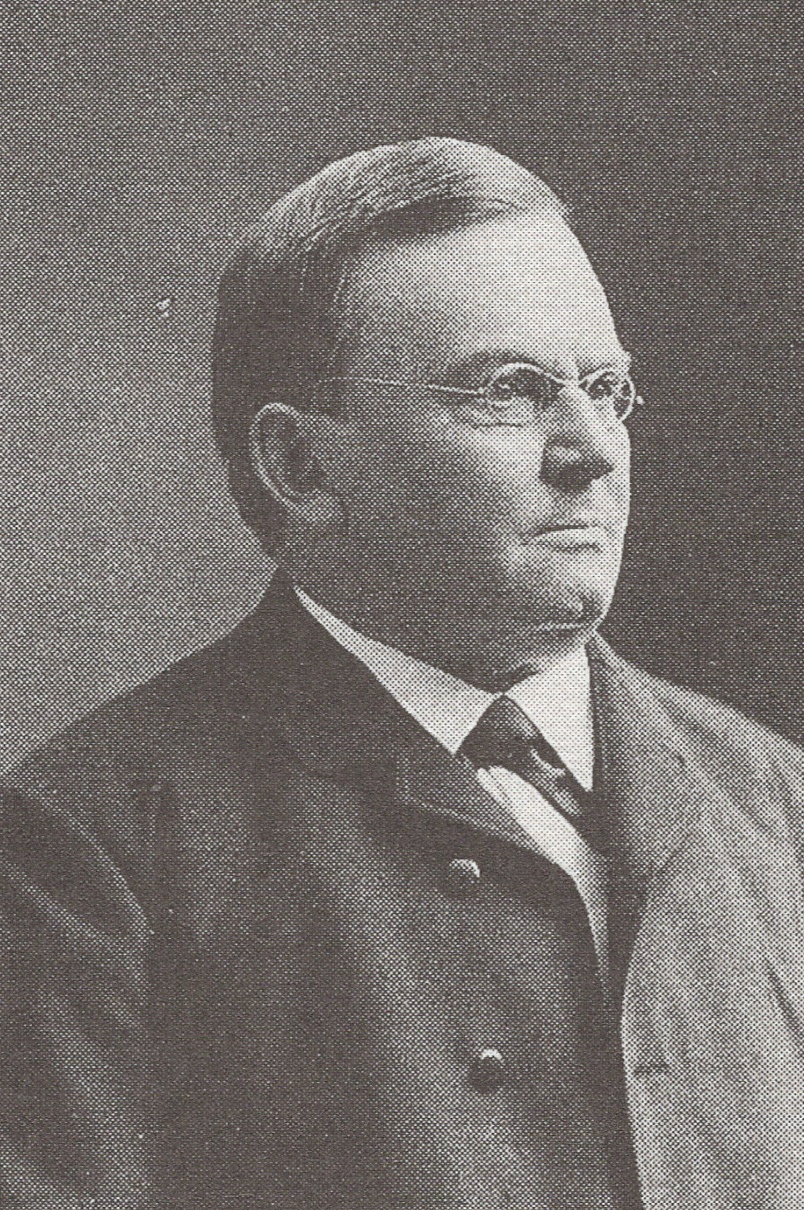
Richard Beez

Richard Beez (27 May 1827 – 28 March 1902) was a German mathematician who proved Beez's theorem.

He studied at the University of Leipzig, where in 1850 he obtained a Ph.D. Later, Beez was a Gymnasium teacher in Plauen.
