= Christof Beetz =

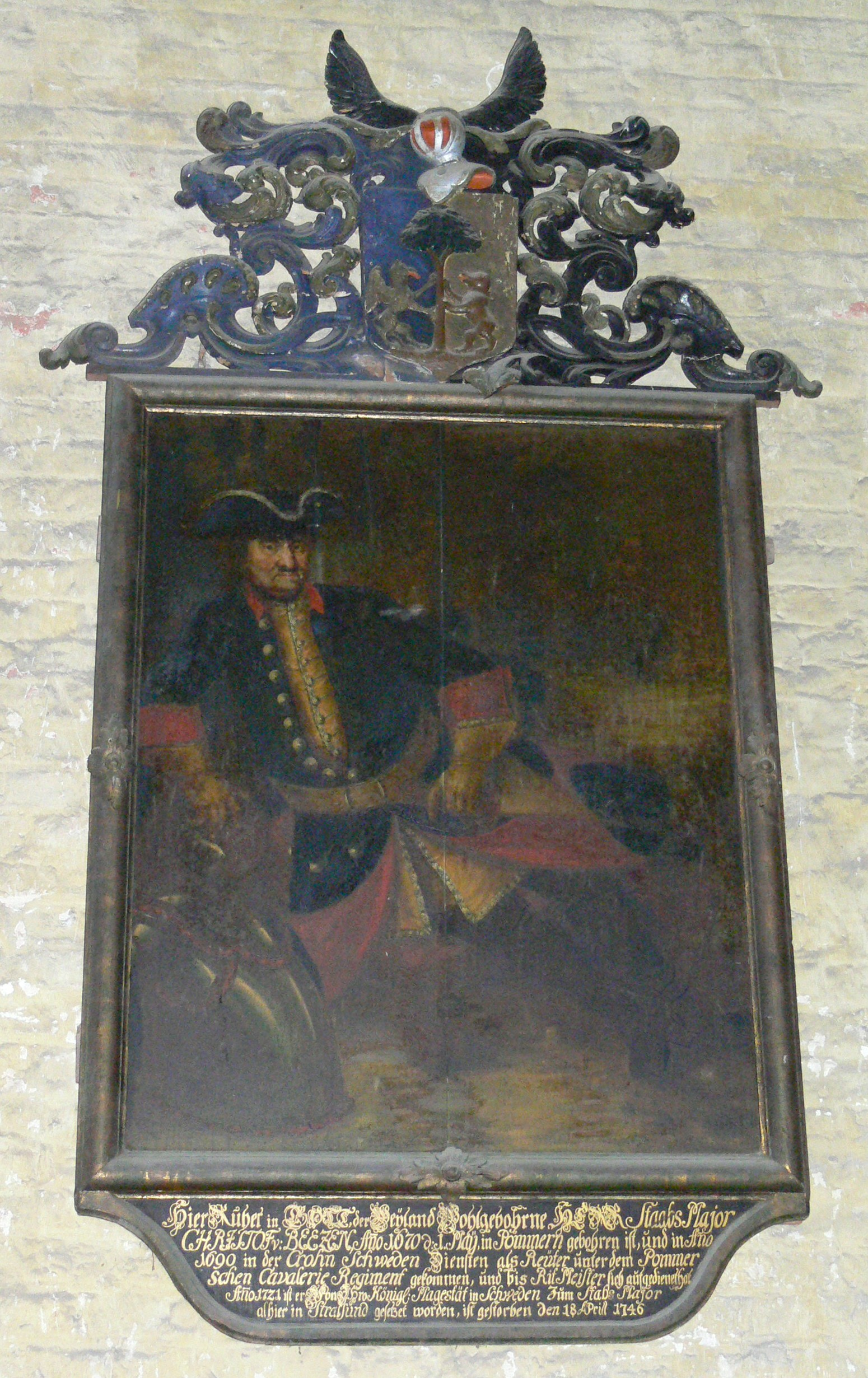
Portrait of Christoph von Beezen at Saint Mary's Church, Stralsund

Christoph Beetz (May 1, 1670, Swedish Pomerania – April 18, 1746, Stralsund) was ennobled by Emperor Charles VI in Vienna, Austria, on 27 January 1734 as "Beez von Beezen" (Beetz von Beetzen) after receiving heritable membership of the old class of the Holy Roman Empire (higher nobility). His military career is highlighted by his command of a regiment at the age of 20 and his final appointment as Swedish Platz-Major and Stabs-Major of the military garrison in Stralsund. He was ranked with the same duties as a Stadt-General. His 1746 portrait still graces the interior of Saint Mary's Church, Stralsund, Germany (German: Kirche St. Marien zu Stralsund) where he is buried.

== Letters patent of Christoph Beetz von Beetzen ==
According to the letters patent of January 27, 1734, now in the Österreichisches Staatsarchiv in Vienna, the nobility and the title Knight of the Holy Roman Empire (Reichsritter) is inherited by "all his present and future legitimate posterity, and their heirs' heirs, men and women in descending line, in infinity" ('Ihn sambt allen seinem jezigen und künftigen ehelichen Leibs-Erben und derenselben Erbens-Erben, Mann- und Weibs-Personen, absteigenden Stammens'). According to Codex Austriacus (ed. Herrenleben, S.G., Wien 1748, pars III, Suppl. I, 1720, page 953, 954) both daughters and sons inherited in Austria after 1720, so the reference "all his present and future legitimate posterity, and their heirs' heirs" refer, according to Austrian law at the time, to both men and women when the letters patent was issued in 1734. This was also understood and underlined by the addition "men and women in descending line in infinity". This pattern for hereditary nobility is called 'cognatic succession'.

The claim that the noble rank could sometimes be inherited cognatically is not undisputed; according to another view all noble titles are inherited agnatically. According to this view, the true meaning of "all his present and future legitimate posterity, and their heirs' heirs, men and women in descending line, in infinity" refer only to men. This statement is understood as a standard formulation in all letters patent - it is not unique for the family von Beezen. The noble daughters married into other families and their children inherited the title belonging to their father. According to this view no one inherits a title from both the mother and the father in European culture.

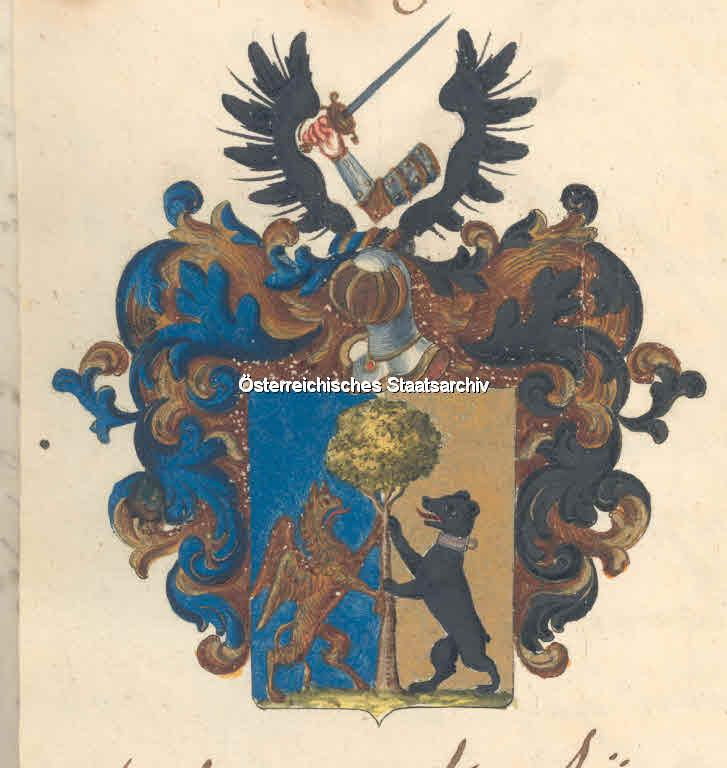
The Coat of Arms for the 'von Beezen' - family

However, this view is contradicted by the fact that there are many undisputed examples of cognatic succession for both male and female descendants, as in the letters patent of nobility issued by Charles VII in December 1429 to Jeanne d'Arc and all her family's descendants, as well as the title Baron (or Count) Arundell of Wardour according to the letters patent issued by Rudolf II in Prague December 14, 1595 for Thomas Arundell and all his descendants, men as well as women. The more common pattern for hereditary nobility, when only men can forward nobility to their children, is called agnatic succession.

== Family from Germany, Sweden, Norway, etc. ==
Christoph Beetz’ parents and grandparents are said to have been employees of the Emperor. Due to the family name, the family may perhaps have come from a district called ‘Beetzendorf ’ south of Berlin and can perhaps be related to the Beetzendorf Castle . But this is nevertheless very long ago, for instance at the 1300 century, due to a check about the ownership at Beetzendorf Castle. Some of his relatives held office in the Swedish state. According to an unconfirmed Swedish family tradition Christoph Beetz' family originally should have come from Russia (or Poland). Christoph Beetz was one of the very famous from the Beetz family. He was married to Anna Sofia from Germany and had two sons, Johan Henrik von Beetzen (born in Stralsund about 1698) and Karl Joakim von Beetzen (born in Stralsund, November 1698). Karl Joakim was married to Anna Helena Giers (born 12 January 1707 in Göteborg) from the famous Giers family from Sweden that also has a famous Russian branch related to the named Russian Foreign Minister for about 13 years, Nikolai Giers Nicholas de Giers, and a known English branch.

The Beetzen family is today mostly known from Sweden, but there are also for instance Norwegian and German descendants.

== Knights through centuries ==
Christoph von Beezen's ancestors included nobles and knights. It was on this basis that the noble letter was accepted for the higher nobility. The emperor and the king based their power from the old days on rich landowners who were able to develop a military army. This can be read about at the Teutonic Knights. In Christoph von Beezen's noble letter his properties are mentioned, and the coat of arms could be used in this context.
