= Egor Egorovich Staal =

Russian diplomat (1822–1907)

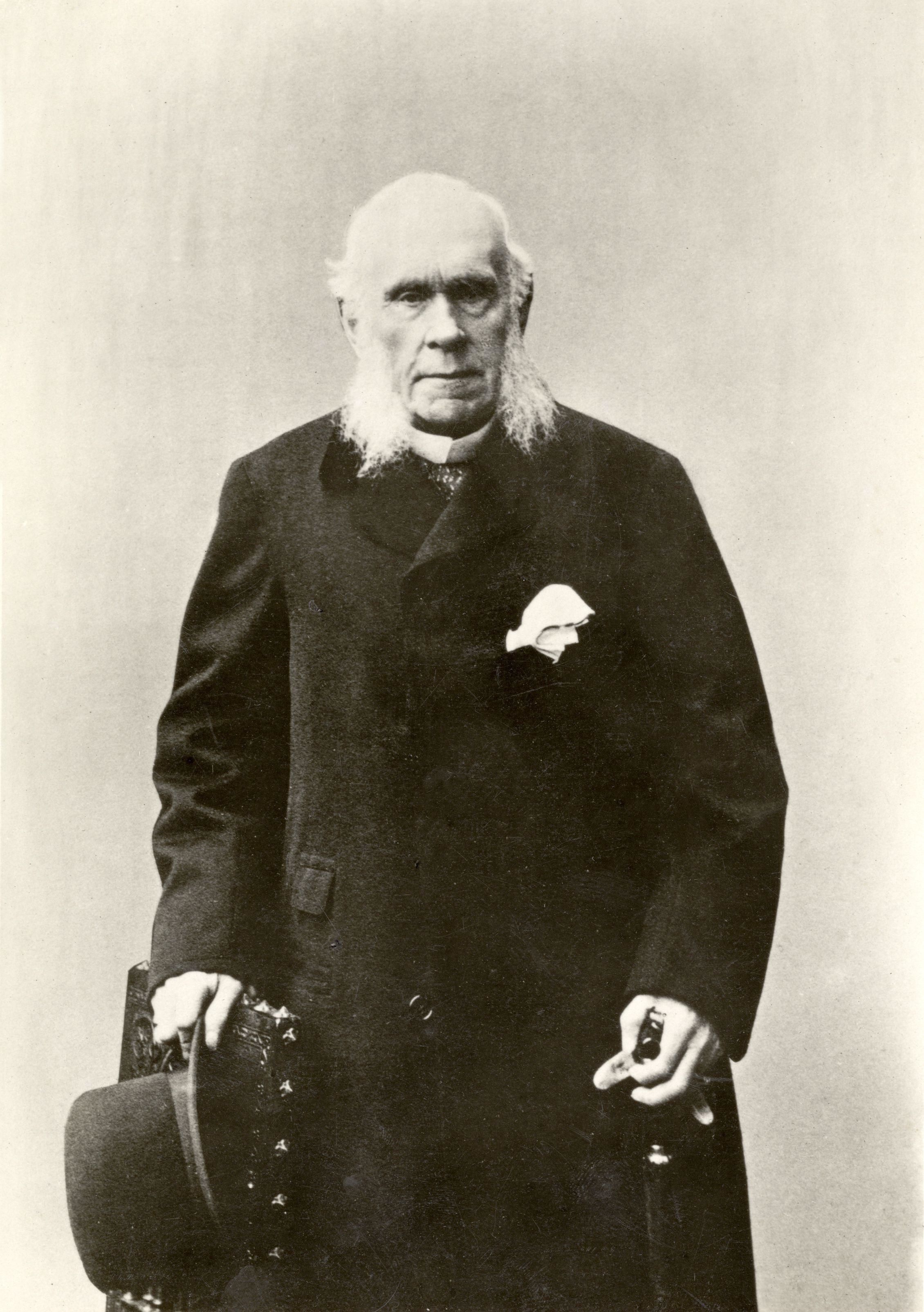
Baron Egor Egorovich Staal

Baron Egor Egorovich Staal (Note: Anglicised as Georges de Staal; francised as Georges Frédéric Charles de Staal.) (Russian: Егор Егорович Стааль; March 1822 – 22 February 1907) was a Russian diplomat who served as the ambassador to the United Kingdom from 1884 to 1902.

== Early life and family ==
Staal was born in March 1822 at Reval, Estonia Governorate, Russian Empire. He was the son of a land-owner. He was educated privately and then at the University of Moscow. After the Crimean War, he married a daughter of Prince Michael Gortschakoff.

Their daughter Theela de Staal married in 1900 Count Alexis Orloff-Davidoff. Her son Lieutenant-Commander Serge Orloff-Davidoff served in the British Navy and was married to Hon. Elizabeth Scott-Ellis, daughter of Thomas Scott-Ellis, 8th Baron Howard de Walden.

== Diplomatic service ==
Staal entered the Russian diplomatic service at the age of 23, when he joined the Asiatic Department. He was posted to Constantinople and was attached to Prince Michael Gortschakoff during the Crimean War.

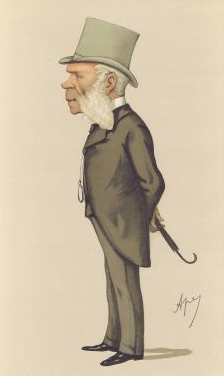
Caricature of Staal in Vanity Fair, 5 December 1885.

After the war, he was Consul-General at Budapest until 1859, when he transferred to Athens. In 1864, he became Conseiller d'Ambassade to Constantinople. In the 1870s and early 1880s, he was Minister at several German states, including Wuerttemberg, before being appointed Ambassador to the United Kingdom in 1884. He declined an offer to be Foreign Minister for Russia in 1896, owing to poor health. He submitted his letters of recall as ambassador in October 1902. Shortly before his retirement, Edward VII received him in audience on 12 August 1902, and appointed him an honorary Knight Grand Cross of the Royal Victorian Order (GCVO). On his return to Russia, Tsar Nicholas II appointed him a member of the Council of the Russian Empire, and a Knight of the Order of St. Andrew.

He died in Paris on 22 February 1907.

== Legacy ==
At his death, the correspondent at The Times wrote "it may be said that he had a very distinguished but uneventful career, for he gained and held with distinction one of the highest posts in the Russian diplomatic service without having ever taken a decisive part in any negotiations of first-rate importance."
