= Nikolay Girs =

Russian statesman (1820–1895)

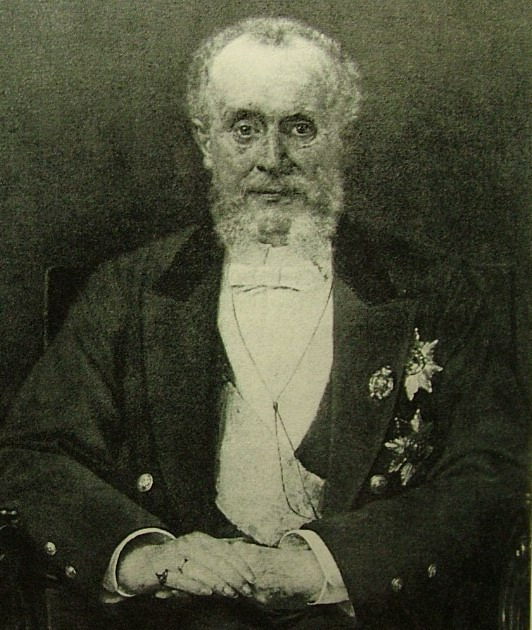
Nikolay Girs c. 1885–1890

Nikolay de Girs or Giers (Russian: Никола́й Ка́рлович Гирс; 21 May [O.S. 9 May] 1820 – 26 January [O.S. 14 January] 1895) was a Russian statesman and diplomat who served as the foreign minister from 1882 to 1895, during the reign of Alexander III. He was one of the architects of the Franco-Russian Alliance, which was later transformed into the Triple Entente, He promoted an image of Russia as a peaceful partner in dealing with complex and dangerous diplomatic situations, but most of the public credit went to Tsar Alexander.

== Biography ==
Nikolay Girs was born in Ukraine. Like his predecessor, Prince Gorchakov, he was educated at the Tsarskoye Selo Lyceum, near St Petersburg, but his career was much less rapid, because he had no influential protectors, and was handicapped by being a Protestant of Teutonic origin. At the age of eighteen, he entered the service of the Eastern department of the Ministry of Foreign Affairs of the Russian Empire, and spent more than twenty years in subordinate posts, chiefly in south-eastern Europe, until he was promoted in 1863 to the post of minister plenipotentiary in Persia. Here he remained for six years, and, after serving as a minister in Switzerland and in Sweden, he was appointed in 1875 director of the Eastern department and assistant minister for foreign affairs under Prince Gorchakov, whose niece he had married.

On the Assassination of Alexander II of Russia in 1881, it was generally expected that Girs would be dismissed as deficient in Russian nationalist feeling, for Alexander III was credited with strong anti-German Slavophile tendencies. In reality, the young tsar did not intend to embark on wild political adventures, and was fully determined not to let his hand be forced by men less cautious than himself. What he wanted was a minister of foreign affairs who would be at once vigilant and prudent, active and obedient, and who would relieve him from the trouble and worry of routine work while allowing him to control the main lines, and occasionally the details, of the national policy. Girs was exactly what he wanted, and accordingly the tsar not only appointed him minister of foreign affairs on the retirement of Prince Gorchakov in 1882, but retained him to the end of his reign in 1894.

Girs systematically followed a pacific policy. Accepting as a fait accompli the existence of the Triple Alliance, created by Bismarck for the purpose of resisting any aggressive action on the part of Russia and France, he sought to establish more friendly relations with the cabinets of Berlin, Vienna, and Rome. To the advances of the French government, he at first turned a deaf ear, but when the rapprochement between the two countries was effected with little or no co-operation on his part, he utilized it for restraining France and promoting Russian interests.

Rivalry between Britain and Russia grew steadily over Central Asia in the Great Game of the late 19th century. Russia desired warm-water ports on the Indian Ocean while Britain wanted to prevent Russian troops from gaining a potential invasion route to India. In 1885, Russia annexed part of Afghanistan in the Panjdeh incident, which caused a war scare. However Girs and the Russian ambassador to London Baron de Staal set up an agreement in 1887, which established a buffer zone in Central Asia. Russian diplomacy won grudging British acceptance of its expansionism. Persia was also an arena of tension, but without warfare.

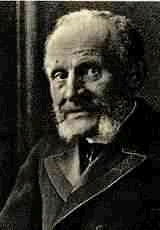

He died on 26 January 1895, soon after the accession of Nicholas II. His son Mikhail Nikolayevich von Giers acted as last Imperial Russian Ambassador in Constantinople until the beginning of World War I in 1914. There were many high ranked 'von Giers' in Russian government, among them President in Podolia and minister Fredrik von Giers (1776-1842), minister Karl Ferdinand von Giers (1777-1835), minister Konstatin von Giers (1777-1835), Ambassador Nikolaus von Giers (1853-1924), Ambassador Mikail von Giers (1856-1932), Admiral Theodor von Giers (1835-1905) etc. And some of these Giers relatives were married to other high-ranked Russian families, among them General Komaroff, Princess Olga Cantacuzene and General Karl de Meyer.

== Legacy ==
According to Margaret Maxwell, historians have underrated his success in a diplomacy that featured numerous negotiated settlements, treaties and conventions. These agreements defined Russian boundaries and restored equilibrium to dangerously unstable situations. He supported numerous international commissions and made many goodwill missions, during which he repeatedly stressed Russia's peaceful intentions. His most dramatic success came in 1885, settling long-standing tensions with Great Britain, which was fearful that Russian expansion to the South would be a threat to India. Girs was usually successful in restraining the aggressive inclinations of Tsar Alexander III, convincing him that the very survival of the tsarist system depended on avoiding major wars. With a deep insight into the tsar's moods and views, Girs was usually able to shape the final decisions by outmaneuvering hostile journalists, ministers, and even the tsarina, as well as his own ambassadors. Under his leadership, Russia fought no foreign wars.

== Orders and decorations ==
- (Austrian Empire) (Kingdom of Hungary) Austria-Hungary: Grand Cross of the Royal Hungarian Order of Saint Stephen, 1884
- Denmark: Knight of the Order of the Elephant, 25 October 1888
- Monaco: Grand Cross of the Order of Saint-Charles, 21 August 1883
- Kingdom of Prussia:
  - Grand Cross of the Order of the Red Eagle, 4 September 1879; in Diamonds, 1881
  - Knight of the Order of the Black Eagle, 22 March 1884
- Sweden-Norway: Knight of the Royal Order of Seraphim, 15 February 1892

== Sources ==
- "Гирс, Николай Карлович" . Brockhaus and Efron Encyclopedic Dictionary (in Russian). 1906.
