= Jean Vigoureux =

French American artist

- Vigoureux c.1935
- Born: Jean Henry Vigoureux; 21 December 1907; 16th arrondissement, Paris, Île-de-France, France
- Died: 30 March 1986 (aged 78); Bronx, New York City, United States
- Citizenship: French; American (1941–)
- Notable work: Twenty-Eight Drawings of Paris (1942)
- Spouse: Fanny Varnum
- Parents: Pierre Vigoureux (father); Jeanne Fonssagrives (mother)
- Relatives: Fernand Fonssagrives (brother); Mia Fonssagrives-Solow (niece); Stefan Soloviev (great-nephew)

Jean Henri Vigoureux (1907–1986) was a French-born American artist.

== Early life ==
Jean Henri Vigoureux was born on the 21 December 1907 in the 16th arrondissement of Paris, to Pierre Vigoureux (1884– 1967) and Jeanne Fonssagrives (1887–). Vigoureux's father, born in Avallon, was a sculptor. Vigoureux's mother, born in Saigon, French Indochina (present-day Ho Chi Minh City, Vietnam), was a singer and pianist. Vigoureux had two younger siblings, Fernand Fonssagrives and Madeleine. Both of Vigoureux's siblings adopted their mother's maiden name following their parents divorce in 1922.

== Military service ==
Under French conscription laws, Vigoureux served a mandatory one year term in the French Army (c. 1927-1929) and subsequently volunteered for an additional year of service in French Indochina. A 1941 exhibition review in San Francisco's United American Artists Gallery later characterized this decision as an opportunity that provided the artist with direct insight into French colonial administration.[1]

Jeanne Fonssagrives with Joël Martel and a plaster bust he made of her in 1915.

Madeleine Fonssagrives, Jean Vigoureux, and Fernand Fonssagrives, c. 1925.

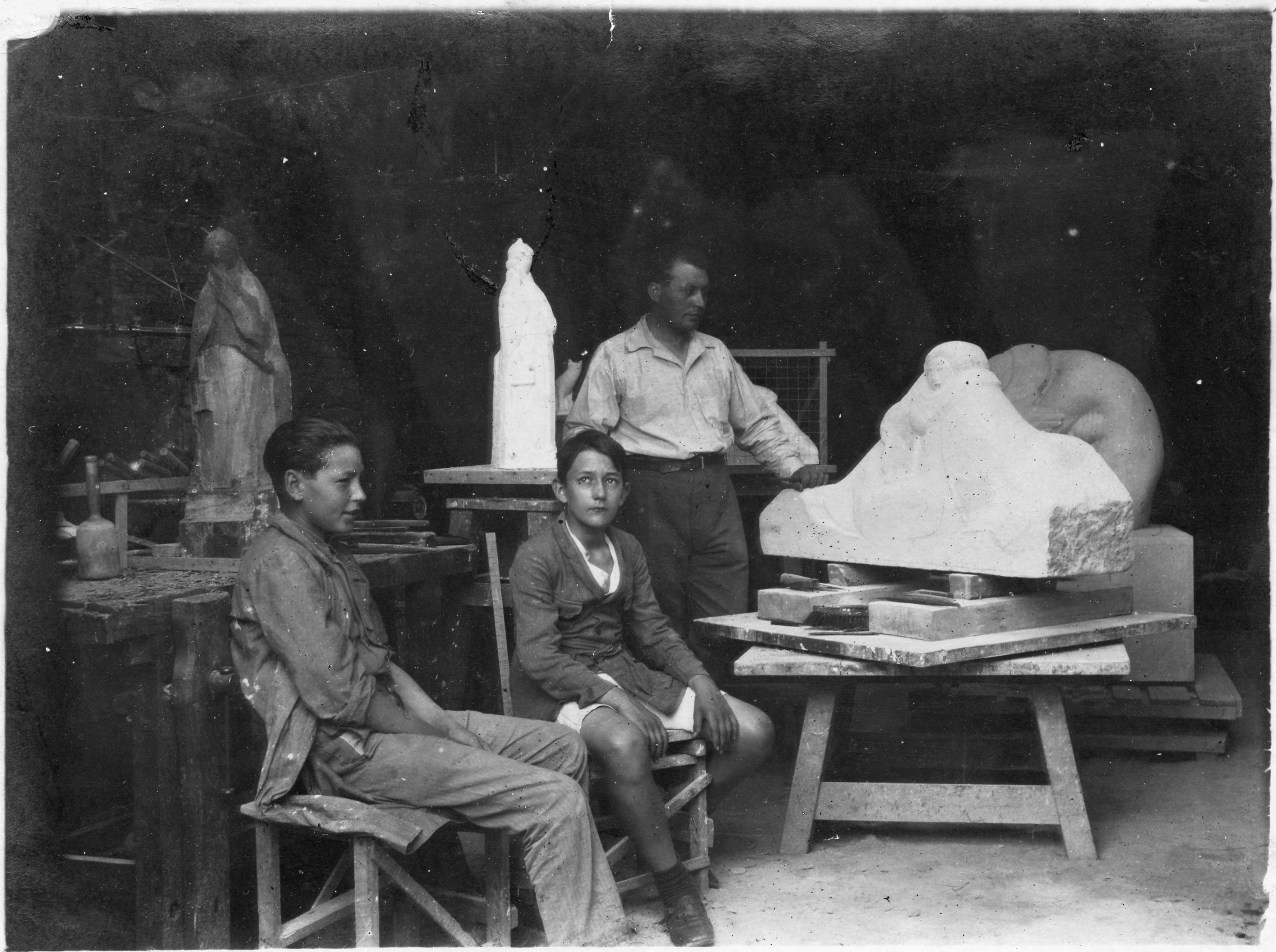
Jean Vigoureux, Fernand Fonssagrives, and Pierre Vigoureux in Pierre's sculpture workshop, c. 1920.

La Boulangerie, oil on canvas, exhibited in 1933 at the Salon de l'Essor in Dijon, France.

Paris Bus, oil on canvas, 1937.

== Career in the United States ==
Jean and his father both exhibited works at the Salon de l'Essor in Dijon in 1933, where Jean's works included his painting La Boulangerie. The Parisian journal Comoedia called it a promising debut for a young painter of "frank and personal talent." Jean also exhibited in the Salon des Tuileries and the Salon des Independants in Paris.

Jean may have met his future wife Fanny G. Varnum in France, where she researched the life of François-Jean de Chastellux and wrote a doctoral thesis submitted to the Faculty of Letters, University of Paris, published in 1936 as Un philosophe cosmopolite du XVIIle slecle, le chevalier de Chastellux (Paris: Librarie Rodstein). Sometime after 1937, Jean and Fanny were in the United States and married, with a marriage license obtained in New York.

The late 1930s found Jean and Fanny living in California. She was a music professor at the University of Southern California. Jean worked at RKO studios in Hollywood.

Jean's first gallery show in the United States was May 5–30, 1938, at the Chelsea Galleries in Hollywood. The Los Angeles Times wrote: "The paintings, which strongly assert the third dimension, are of the deliberately 'proletarian' sort, the figures of workmen and their families clumsily drawn in gloomy colors to convey the idea of their thwarted lives. The drawings, which show an anti-imperialist slant on French officialdom in Indo-China, prove that Vigoureux is an able draughtsman and a remarkable and painstaking designer." The Hollywood Citizen-News wrote: "From the standpoint of originality, the oils of Jean Vigoureux…go far in the direction of excellence. He paints solidly, somberly, in a restricted range of unusual colors and tones." The French-language newspaper Le Courrier Français wrote (translated from French): "The opportunity is too rarely given to us to admire the works of a young French painter with more future than past. Mr. Jean Vigoureux gives us this opportunity. His most remarkable works are, in our opinion, the four paintings on Indo-China:The Arroyo; The Annamite Farm; Annamese Workers; Ruins of Angkor ."

In November 1938, Vigoureux had a show at the Kievits Galleries in Pasadena. In the Pasadena Star-News Jules Kievits described his work as "Modern, but not insane. Colorful, although subdued, silver greys predominating. His subjects are chosen from real life, and he does not adhere to 'isms' nor follow any 'school." The San Marino Tribune wrote:

There prevails a note of undeniable interest in the exhibit of eighteen oil paintings, and many drawings now on display at the Kievits Galleries…The interest is two-fold, firstly, it gives us an idea of what is felt by the young artist, at the other side of the Atlantic, and secondly, how it is expressed and rendered. The present prevailing conditions naturally strongly influenced the artist. The fifteen paintings brought with him from France, do not deal with the beauty of the landscape, city, or human beings, but enter into the present struggle of humanity, which is facing the people of France at every step. It portrays people on the street, in their shops, and in their homes. His paintings all pertain to people as they live now. How else could it be, that these observations are expressed in a low key? How else could it be, that only sparingly a note of joy, or a subject of cheer enters? The artist could not have been true to these times, when the great happenings of this day so dominate. But in every one of his works, there is a beauty of its own, a beauty rendered in a simple palette, where silver greys complement an arrangement of deep warm colors. After leaving France, the artist…went to Indo-China. It is interesting to see how the change of scenery influenced his palette. In two of his works from there, The Home of the River [River Home, Saigon] and Indo-China Farmer, light is entering his canvas, joining his very correct drawing and compositions. There also are a great many pen drawings, marvelous observation, painstaking execution, an exceptional gift for composition prevail through all of them.”

The eighteen oil paintings exhibited at the Kievits Galleries:

1. Silk Weavers, Indo-China.
2. Indo-Chinese Farmer.
3. River Home, Saigon.
4. Smiling Buddha.
5. War Shadow.
6. Casualty.
7. Neighborhood Market, Paris.
8. Design for Living.
9. L’Aperitif.
10. Family Group.
11. Shoring, Paris Subway.
12. News.
13. Ward Patient.
14. Paris Bakery.
15. Paris Bus.
16. Street Singer, Paris.
17. Paris Café.
18. Papa Peslier, Vezelay.

Vigoureux exhibited at the Golden Gate International Exposition in 1939 in San Francisco A subsequent exhibit in San Francisco appeared at the California Palace of the Legion of Honor from November 16 to December 6, 1940. The San Francisco Examiner wrote that Vigoureux's "illustrations of French and Indo-China everyday life are elaborately complex, and they let excessive crudity pass in the hope that it will signify deep, simple feeling.”

Vigoureux had an exhibit organized by The Renaissance Society of the University of Chicago from January 3–21, 1941. From the announcement: "The works exhibited in the Goodspeed Galleries at the University of Chicago include a series of pen drawings illustrating in a striking, somewhat satirical way scenes from daily life in Paris and a number of more recent oil paintings in which the artist tries to solve certain problems of color, while the drawings continue in the striking manner of the earlier drawings."

== Drawings of French Indochina ==
While in the French Army, posted to Indochina, Jean had a role as an enforcer of the French Colonial Empire, but his feelings about the situation are expressed in drawings based on his personal experiences and observations, "which show an anti-imperialist slant on French officialdom in Indo-China."

Loading Precious Wood depicts laborers foisting a massive piece of timber onto an open rail car, which would ride on railroad tracks resting on the railroad ties also harvested from these forests, as described by Pamela D. McElwee in Forests Are Gold: Trees, People, and Environmental Rule in Vietnam. "Yet this 'Precious Wood' was not to be used by local people, as the best and most valuable wood was found in 'Reserved Forests'...and rights to timber sold for public auction by private contractors...with tax revenues going to colonial authorities......these reserves were inaugurated mostly near major communication routes (rivers, seashores, roads, canals, railroads) as close as possible to a place of labor."

In Vigoureux's drawing Floating Mahogany, the practice of harvesting very large trees to be floated down-river is illustrated. In Jungle Lumber Yard, cuts have been made by local workers to a large piece of timber, with stacks of cut timber neatly piled to the right. In Rubber Plantation, a French overseer sits on a horse, a shotgun strapped to his back and rounds of ammunition circling his waist, as he supervises workers at a rubber plantation. "Other products were grown on vast plantations, making huge profits for owners, including tobacco, coffee, rubber, etc."

Sometimes Vigoureux uses words on signs, newspapers, and posters within his drawings. In Opium Den, the sign on the wall reads: "It is prohibited to smoke any other opium than that of the Regie Française, which manufactures the only genuine Chandoo...", signed for the "Office of Customs and Cruelty" by Négrier (a word meaning slaver or slave trader). Although the opium trade had been outlawed, the only existing tobacco monopoly of France was actually created by the Regie Company, operating as La Societe de la Regie co-interessee des tabacs de l’empire Ottoman. This tobacco company was run by the government itself. The sign insinuates that the French government was in charge of the opium trade.

In Street Scene, a poster on the wall advertises "Strongboxes for industrialists and bankers." A barefoot man drives his male passenger through the streets in a rickshaw. A young boy runs in the street, carrying the bourgeois newspaper Le Bourremou, whose subtitle is Organ of the Plutocracy. The headline reads, "The unyielding spirit of the workers rouses the dissatisfaction of the Bosses." A sign on the back wall reads: "Sale. Furniture & real estate by auction. A straw hut having only served 12 generations. A wooden bunker. three pa mats. A low hold. A ke-kouan. Two hats. Conical, one of which is wood. A bag of rice. Military pants, etc. etc. Tax entry."

In The Ruins of Angkor, a group of French soldiers try to get a young Cambodian girl to pose in the photograph with them. Several locations of old ruins from the Khmer Empire were in the French protectorate of Cambodia. Angkor Wat was the biggest of these. An identical Buddha (but on a smaller scale) can be seen in Vigoureux's painting of a seated Buddha with broken arm.

Asia magazine published four of Vigoureux's pen-and-ink drawings (described as "watercolors") in their December 1940 issue: Marketplace (Saigon), Loading Precious Wood, Southern Indochina: Rice Fields, and Soup Vendor.

Indochina - Loading Precious Wood, pen and ink on paper, 1930s.

Indochina - Floating Mahogany, pen and ink on paper, 1930s.

Indochina - Jungle Lumber Yard, pen and ink on paper, 1930s.

Indochina - Rubber Plantation, pen and ink on paper, 1930s.

Indochina - Opium Den pen and ink on paper, 1930s.

Indochina - Street Scene, pen and ink on paper, 1930s.

Indochina - The Ruins of Angkor, pen and ink on paper, 1930s.

== Twenty-Eight Drawings of Paris ==
In 1942, Plantin Press in Los Angeles published Twenty-Eight Drawings of Paris, a limited-edition portfolio (300 copies) of drawings by Vigoureux depicting daily life in the French capital on the eve of World War II. For its design, the book was cited in Fifty Books of the Year, 1943.

From the book's introduction by Elliot Paul:

The work of Jean Vigoureux portrays the spirit of a people, not in the throes of war, but living in constant apprehension under the cloud of war’s approach. The Parisians knew their country was to be attacked, and that it was honeycombed with traitors and enemies within. They knew their ally England was as badly equipped as they were. The corrupt politicians and a corrupter press were trying to lull them into a false security. Still they clung to life, as they had known it and their ancestors had known it. They could not quite believe that France would pass away. Robbed and victimized, governed by Nazi puppets and living under constant threat of Nazi bayonets, the Parisians still do not believe their country and their civilization is no more.

Paul ends on a more hopeful note, saying the drawings "carry an assurance that in spite of enemy-controlled propaganda, the French have not lost their integrity but only the chance to be known and heard. Vigoureux’s drawings help one to know them. His technique is derived from the sound training his father, the director of the Ecole des Beaux Arts at Dijon, imparted to him and a wistful zest for life.”

As in his drawings of French Indochina, words appear in the images, driving home their satirical and political intent. In No. 5, Café, a man is reading the sports page in a paper for the upper classes, Le Bourremou, which announces the winner of the "Armament Races"— "Adolf Pig" and "Benito Pig" (referring to Adolf Hitler and Benito Mussolini), with the Japanese placing third. The novel La Condition Humaine (English title: Man's Fate) by Andre Malraux sits on the table. The young man at the center of the scene writes, "The heritage left to us by the old generation is indeed a great mockery. However, each war pushes progress forward with great kicks in the rear, and…finally we understand."

In No. 6, Opposition, a young woman clutches a newspaper called Human Progress with the headline, "Let Us Overthrow the Oldsters With Their Odious and Outmoded Experiences!"

In No. 16, Subway, there are newspapers on the back wall. Nazi swastikas bookend either side of The Bugle of The Fiery Cross. Below that is Le Matin, with the subtitle A Bought Journal and a swastika printed on either side. Near the token booth, the price list for a ride is significantly higher "After The Elections" than "Before The Elections." At the bottom of the price list, "The Next Time" indicates the highest price of all, five francs.

In No. 23, Sidewalk Café, a man is reading Le Bourremou. One side reads, "Germany will find us prepared." On the other side: "Carnage, Destruction, Abominable Horror—This is War." Another man is reading a newspaper in English, with the headline, "The Cezanne Exhibition in New York Met A Great Success."

In #25, Street Scene, a shop in the center of the drawing advertises “Funeral Services.” Although several posters on the front advertise the standard funeral horse-drawn carriages, a prominent ad features a “Special Burial,” with the picture of a tank. And in a bit of sardonic humor there is a picture of a wheelbarrow, with the words “Fixed Price.” The movie theater's featured movie is “Quo Vadis Satanas,” Latin for “Where Are You Going, Adversary?”

In #27, Bookshop, book enthusiasts crowd the small shop. A man with a pipe in his mouth carries a book titled Fracas in Beverly Hills by Homer Evans, a playful nod to a series of actual detective novels written by the author of the introduction to Twenty-Eight Drawings, Elliot Paul, in which the lead detective's name is Homer Evans, including Fracas in the Foothills: A Homer Evans Western Murder Mystery and Open Space Adventure (Random House, 1940). The man in the back of the book store is holding a map with U.S.S.R. on the left side and United States on the right, with "Torpedoed Ocean" indicated in large block letters on the left-hand side. Le Bourremou has a new subtitle: "The Daily Organized Lie." To the left, a bespectacled man in a hat, with a full beard, is reading Mein Kampf by Adolf Hitler but the book is upside-down, and the author's name is "Adolf Schwein" (German for "pig.") La Condition Humaine (English title: Man's Fate) by Andre Malraux sits prominently on the table. Malraux was a target of the Otto Abetz blacklisting of authors forbidden to be read, circulated, or sold in Nazi-occupied France.

No. 5, Café from Twenty-Eight Drawings of Paris.

No. 6, Opposition from Twenty-Eight Drawings of Paris.

No. 16, Subway from Twenty-Eight Drawings of Paris.

No. 23, Sidewalk Cafe from Twenty-Eight Drawings of Paris.

No. 25, Street Scene from Twenty-Eight Drawings of Paris.

No.27, Book Shop from Twenty-Eight Drawings of Paris.

Two of Vigoureux's drawings from the book were published in The Clipper magazine, January, 1941, with text explaining they were "part of a series on Paris, before its downfall…done with the intention of portraying the wretched state of the French working class, even before the Nazi oppression. Opposition is a good example of how Vigoureux shows the conflicts of our time by contrasting the people who live in it. He personalizes the struggle of young people everywhere against the false conventions of their societies, in this biting scene of a young couple returning from a grocery store and bravely facing the sneers of a wealthy old man and woman."

Vigoureux exhibited the works in Los Angeles at the Raymond & Raymond Galleries, March 14 to April 5, 1941. The Los Angeles Times wrote: “Ordinary persons shown as they go through the drab routines of daily existence are the subject matter of Jean Vigoureux…He finds individuals humorous in a way that often impels him to hint at caricature as he draws them. He is meticulous in his technique, leaving nothing to chance, and seeing that everything is stated to the smallest detail."

He had an exhibit at the American Contemporary Gallery in Hollywood, from January 31, 1942, to February 17, 1942. From the gallery's pamphlet: "Like his compatriot, the great novelist Andre Malraux, Jean Vigoureux combines with his artistic talent that profound political understanding and that genuinely progressive outlook which have achieved a perfect unity of artistic form with a political content which is not only satirical as in most of the drawings, but often, especially in the paintings, full of that dramatic and emotional quality which is indeed one of the truest aspects of the struggle of modern society." The Los Angeles Times gave a more bleak assessment: "Jean Vigoureux, a young French painter now in Hollywood, sees a world steeped in gloom."

The works in Twenty-Eight Drawings of Paris include:

1. Street Musicians
2. Restaurant
3. Bus
4. Fish Market
5. Café
6. Opposition
7. Interior
8. Street Performers
9. Grocery
10. Charity
11. Central Station
12. Apothecary
13. Family Gathering
14. Double Feature
15. Butcher Shop
16. Subway
17. Ward Patient
18. Big Business
19. Underground Workers
20. Outdoor Market
21. The Seine
22. Billiards
23. Sidewalk Café
24. Bakery
25. Street Scene
26. Circus
27. Book Shop
28. Museum

== World War II; later landscapes ==
On September 21, 1942, in Los Angeles, Jean Vigoureux enlisted as a private in the U.S. Army Corps of Engineers. Documents show he was both married and a United States citizen. His term of service was "Enlistment for the duration of the War or other emergency, plus six months, subject to the discretion of the President or otherwise according to law."

Defense Malt, painted c. 1942, depicts a young couple in wartime enjoying a "malted" in a malt shop.

After the war, details about his life and career are scarcer. Art historian and collector Edan Hughes noted that his paintings included "landscapes and historic landmarks." In later years, Vigoureux made more landscapes, and many of these were in oil on wood instead of canvas. Autumn in Bar Harbor, Maine (November 1955), oil on wood, features rocks, a stream, and trees in autumnal shades of red and gold.

Vigoureux returned to certain images and themes. His Indochina landscape painted on wood in 1958, Jungle River, was based on L’Arroyo, an oil on canvas exhibited twenty years earlier in his first U.S. gallery show. The painting depicts a calm river amid lush foliage. An epiphyte, likely a bromeliad, grows on a fallen tree branch, with a pink flower at its center and spiky green leaves.

An untitled painting of uncertain date shows a very different side of Vigoureux the political provocateur steeped in gloom. The oil on canvas depicts a black-robed figure (perhaps a self-portrait) in a dense jungle standing behind a seated Buddha with a broken arm; the Buddha is exactly like the one in Vigoureux's 1930s drawing Ruins of Angkor, but its location and scale are very different. The Buddha in the drawing is gigantic, the mute witness of an unpleasant scene of raucous soldiers playing tourist and cajoling a hapless woman. In the painting, the Buddha is life-size and its shadowy, secluded surroundings project an atmosphere of serenity, meditation, and mystery.

Defense Malt, oil on canvas, c. 1942.

Autumn in Bar Harbor Maine, oil on wood, Nov. 1955.

Jungle River (Indochina landscape), oil on wood, 1958.

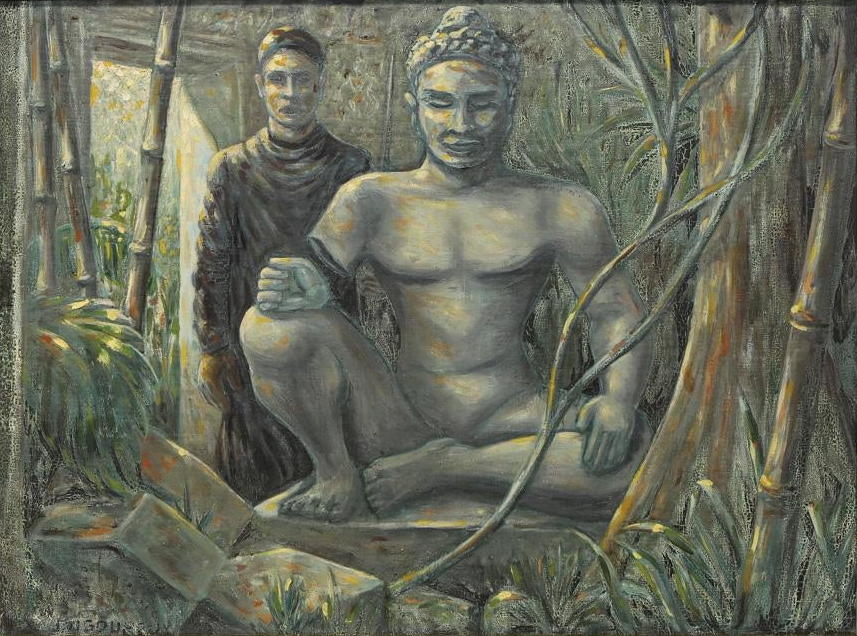
Seated Buddha with broken arm; undated.
