= Mia Fonssagrives-Solow =

American sculptor

- Born: Mia Fonssagrives; 1941 (age 84–85); New York City, U.S.
- Education: Parsons School of Design
- Occupations: Sculptor, fashion designer
- Spouses: Louis Féraud (m. 1967; div. 1970); Sheldon Solow (m. 1972; died 2020)
- Children: 2, including Stefan Soloviev
- Parents: Fernand Fonssagrives (father); Lisa Fonssagrives (mother)

Mia Fonssagrives-Solow (née Fonssagrives; born 1941), is an American sculptor and fashion designer. In the 1960s, she was a fashion- and costume designer based in Paris.

== Early life ==
Fonssagrives was born in 1941, the daughter of French photographer Fernand Fonssagrives (né Vigoreux or Fonssagrives-Vigoreux) and Swedish supermodel Lisa Fonssagrives (née Lisa Birgitta Bernstone). Her paternal uncle is famed artist Jean Vigoreux.

Fonssagrives-Solow grew up between Huntington and Manhattan in New York, where she studied at the private Dalton School, and later at an all-girls boarding school. At eight years old, after her parents divorced, she moved in with her mother and Irving Penn. As a teenager, Fonssagrives began to make clothes which her mother would sell to her friends. After finishing school, Fonssagrives was accepted into Parsons School of Design on a part-time scholarship.

== Career ==
In 1962, Fonssagrives met fashion designer Vicky Tiel at Parsons, and the two quickly became friends and business partners. They moved to Paris in 1964 and met designer Louis Féraud. In Féraud's couture show in July 1964, the Mia-Vicky mini dress was introduced, and after seeing the Mia-Vicky minis at the Féraud show, the International Herald Tribune writer, Eugenia Sheppard, wrote an article headlined, "Anyone in Fashion Over 25 Might as Well Be Dead". Life magazine wrote a five-page story on the young designers titled, "Two American Girls Show Paris," and in December 1964, Johnny Carson invited Tiel and Fonssagrives in their mini dresses on his Tonight Show. Fonssagrives and Féraud became engaged in 1967 and were married that same year.

Fonssagrives and Tiel were hired as costume designers for a Woody Allen film, What's New Pussycat?, shot in Paris. While shooting at the studio, the pair met Elizabeth Taylor, and in 1968, after four years of dressing her, Taylor became a partner in the Mia-Vicky couture house. In May 1968, the Mia-Vicky shop opened on 21 Rue Bonaparte Paris, and the boutique was in business until 2011. As costume designers, Fonssagrives and Tiel introduced a satin wrap dress in 1967 for the movie Candy worn by actress Ewa Aulin.

In 1970, Fonssagrives divorced Féraud and left Paris, and Tiel renamed their label and boutique "Vicky Tiel." Fonssagrives returned to the United States to study woodworking in California. In 1972 she married New York real estate developer Sheldon Solow and the couple had two sons, Stefan and Nikolai. The family's Solow Art and Architecture Foundation exhibits a small part of the art collection to the public at its building at 9 West 57th Street in Manhattan.

Fonssagrives-Solow continues to work and exhibit as a sculptor and jewellery designer in New York.

== Personal life ==
Fonssagrives married New York real estate developer Sheldon Solow in 1972, and the couple went on to have two sons, Stefan Soloviev and Nikolai Solow. The family has amassed a fortune of several billion dollars through its real estate portfolio and art collection.
