= Vicky Tiel =

American fashion designer

Vicky Tiel (aka Vicki Tiel) is an American-born fashion designer who established her career in Paris, France. She is a couture designer and also has her own line of clothes on the Home Shopping Network. She is the author of the book, It's All About The Dress: What I Learned in Forty Years About Men, Women, Sex and Fashion published in 2011.

== Early years ==
Vicky Kay Tiel was born in Washington DC to Ethel Kipnes, a painter from Hudson, New York and David Teitelbaum, a Polish-Russian born architect and builder. She studied fashion design at Pratt Institute and later Parsons School of Design in New York City. In 1963 while still in school, Tiel created the one-piece zip-front jumpsuit, later worn by Ursula Andress in Woody Allen's, What's New Pussycat?.

While at Parsons School of Design in 1962, Tiel met Mia Fonssagrives (daughter of Swedish supermodel Lisa Fonssagrives and step-daughter of fashion photographer Irving Penn), and the two quickly became friends and business partners. They moved to Paris in 1964 and met designer Louis Féraud. In Féraud's couture show in July 1964, the Mia-Vicky mini dress was introduced. After seeing the Mia-Vicky minis at the Féraud show, The International Herald Tribune writer, Eugenia Sheppard, wrote in headlines in "Anyone in Fashion Over 25 Might as Well Be Dead". Life magazine wrote a five-page story on the young designers titled, "Two American Girls Show Paris" and they were internationally recognized. In December 1964, Johnny Carson invited Tiel and Fonssagrives in their mini dresses on his "Tonight Show".

== Career ==
Tiel's first film credit as a costume designer was for What's New Pussycat?, shot in Paris, France. While shooting at the studio, Tiel met her first financial backer, Elizabeth Taylor. In 1968, after four years of dressing Taylor, Tiel and Taylor became partners in the Mia-Vicky couture house. In May 1968, the Mia-Vicky shop opened on 21 Rue Bonaparte Paris and is still in operation today. As a costume designers, Tiel and Fonssagrives introduced a satin wrap dress in 1967 for the movie Candy worn by actress Ewa Aulin.

In 1970, after Fonssagrives divorced Féraud and left Paris, Tiel changed her label and their boutique into her own name, Vicky Tiel.

In 2012, Vicky Tiel joined HSN TV in St Petersburg, Florida to produce a line of affordable dresses and in 2013 Tiel added sportswear, coats and handbags, all produced from a licensing agreement with G111 Corporation at 512 7th Ave, NY. This is Tiel's first work as a designer for an American company since the late 60s.

=== Perfumes ===
Tiel has produced a line of fragrances, starting with the eponymous "Vicky Tiel" in 1989—later re-named "Originale" to distinguish from other releases under the label. Later releases were licensed, manufactured, and distributed by Five Star Fragrance Co., with the most recent, "Femme Absolue", in 2017.

=== Publications ===
Tiel published a memoir titled It's All About the Dress in 2011 by St Martin's Press, and has appeared at the 2012 LA Times Book Fair. Tiel published a second book, The Absolute Woman: It's All About Feminine Power in 2018. Tiel is a frequent blogger on The Huffington Post and XO JANE.

== Personal life ==
Vicky Tiel was married to makeup artist, Ron Berkeley, from 1971 to 1986. Tiel and Berkeley have two sons, Rex and Richard. In 1996, Tiel married Merchant Marine Officer, Captain Mike Hamilton and resides in Paris, New York, and on a Florida wilderness farm.

== Fine art and other works ==
In 2011, Tiel became a member of National Association of Women's Artists on 80 5th Ave, NYC, where Tiel and her mother, Ethel Kipnes, both show their work in oil paintings and photographs. Tiel is a fashion critic and frequent lecturer at the Fashion Institute of Technology in NY.

== Costume Designer, Film Credits ==
- What's New Pussycat, 1964
- The Eye of the Devil, 1966
- The Grand Prix, 1966
- Doctor Faustus, 1967
- Candy, 1968
- The Walking Stick, 1970
- The Only Game in Town, 1970
- Bloomfield, 1971
- Le Mans, 1971
- La Maison Sous Les Arbres, 1971
- Bluebeard, 1972

Tiel's dresses have appeared on the leading actresses in Saturday Night Fever 1977, Black Rain 1989 and Pretty Woman 1990
