= Solow Building =

Office skyscraper in Manhattan, New York

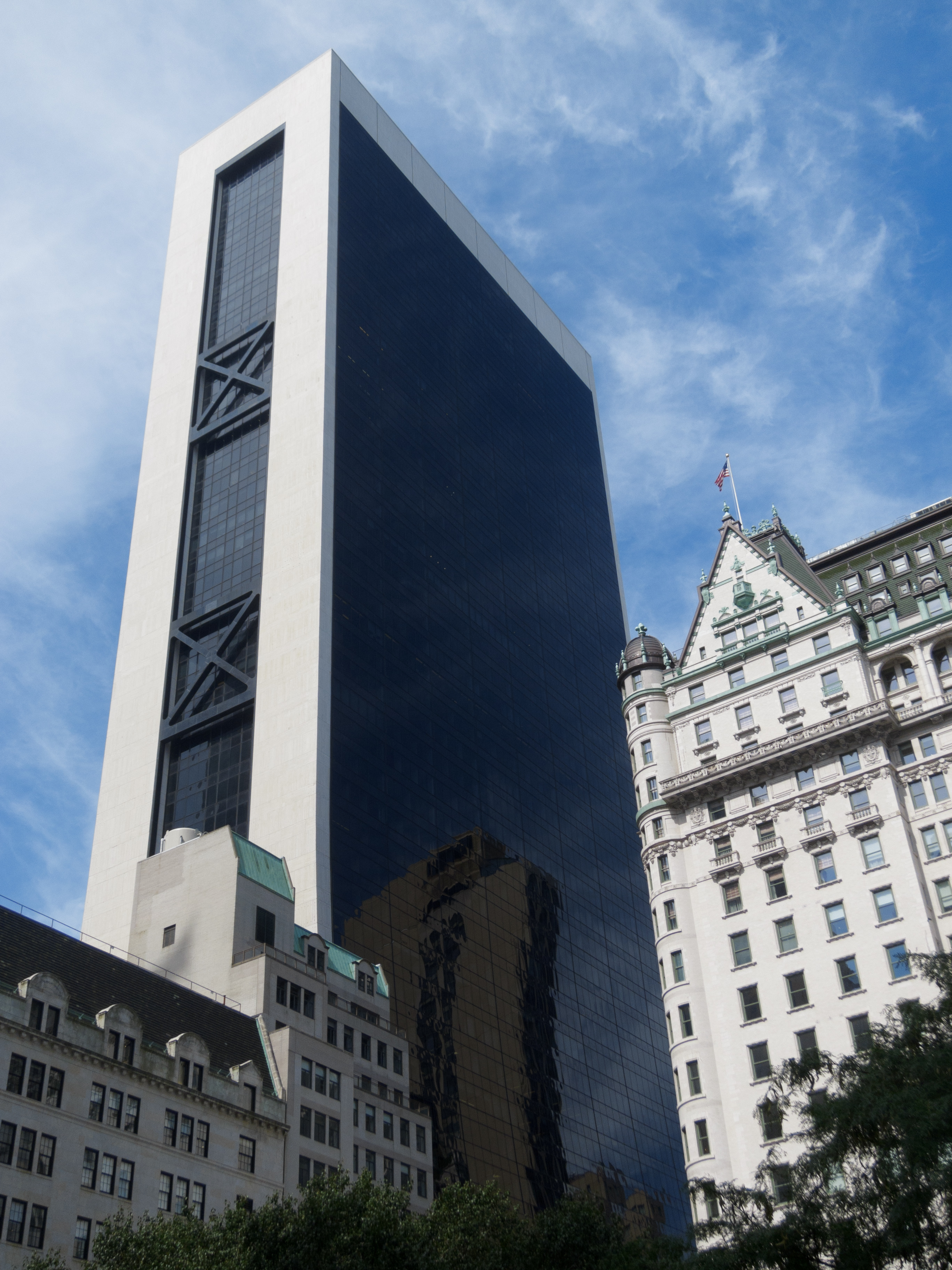
- Seen from 5th Avenue and 59th Street
- Interactive map of the Solow Building area

General information
- Type: Commercial offices
- Location: 9 West 57th Street; Manhattan, New York, US
- Coordinates: 40°45′50″N 73°58′29″W
- Construction started: 1970
- Completed: 1972
- Opening: 1972
- Owner: Stefan Soloviev
- Operator: Soloviev Group

Height
- Roof: 689 ft (210 m)

Technical details
- Floor count: 50
- Floor area: 1.4×10^{6} ft^{2} (130,064 m^{2})
- Lifts/elevators: 34

Design and construction
- Architects: Gordon Bunshaft; Skidmore, Owings & Merrill
- Developer: Solow Building Corporation
- Structural engineer: Weidlinger Associates; Cosentini Associates

The Solow Building, also known as 9 West 57th Street, is a skyscraper in the Midtown Manhattan neighborhood of New York City. Completed in 1974 and designed by Gordon Bunshaft of Skidmore, Owings & Merrill, it is west of Fifth Avenue between 57th and 58th Streets, overlooking the Plaza Hotel and Central Park. The building measures 689 feet (210 m) tall with 50 stories. 9 West 57th Street was developed by Sheldon Solow, who named the building after himself and continued to manage and own the building until his death in 2020. Since then, it has been owned by his son Stefan Soloviev.

The Solow Building's north and south facades curve inward from ground level to the 18th floor, where the tower rises upward to the 50th story. The north and south walls are made of gray-tinted glass, while the west and east facades are clad in travertine. The design was largely criticized upon the building's completion, with many architectural critics regarding the building as a disruptive presence on the skyline. There is a travertine plaza at ground level, with a red sculpture of the digit "9" on the 57th Street side. The first floor contains a private art collection and the basement includes the Brasserie 8 1/2 restaurant. The building contains about 1.5 million square feet (140,000 m^{2}) of rentable space.

Solow acquired the building's site in the 1960s from numerous owners, including the Church of Jesus Christ of Latter-day Saints, which had originally planned its own skyscraper at the site. Construction of the Solow Building commenced in 1969, and Avon Products took up a third of the space, becoming the major tenant. Since opening, the Solow Building's office stories have been occupied for some of the highest rates in the city, being rented largely to law and financial firms. The lower stories were less successful; the basement was unused until 2000, when Brasserie 8 1/2 opened there. During his lifetime, Solow was obstinate about several aspects of the building's operation, and he was involved in several lawsuits against tenants.

== Site ==
The Solow Building is at 9 West 57th Street in the Midtown Manhattan neighborhood of New York City, just south of Central Park, between Fifth Avenue to the east and Sixth Avenue to the west. It contains frontage on 57th Street to the south and 58th Street to the north. The Solow Building's site covers 62,058 square feet (5,765.4 m^{2}). It measures 268 feet (82 m) along 57th Street, with a depth of 200.83 feet (61.21 m) between 57th and 58th Streets. The Solow Building is near the Park Lane Hotel and the Plaza Hotel to the north, Grand Army Plaza and the General Motors Building to the northeast, the Bergdorf Goodman Building and the Paris Theater to the east, and the Crown Building and 17 West 56th Street to the south.

The surrounding stretch of 57th Street was part of an artistic hub during the late 19th and early 20th centuries. The southern part of the site was occupied by the Pace Gallery, which operated there from 1963 to 1968. On the northern part of the site was a 14-story building at 4 West 58th Street, containing the Paris Theater. The Solow Building also replaced a six-story loft building on 26 West 58th Street that had housed the office of modernist architect Paul Rudolph. The rest of the site was largely composed of low-rise commercial and apartment buildings. The Solow Building, as well as the Squibb Building at 40 West 57th Street, were among the first high-rise office developments to be built on West 57th Street following the 1961 Zoning Resolution.

== Architecture ==
9 West 57th Street was designed by Gordon Bunshaft of Skidmore, Owings and Merrill (SOM) and developed by Sheldon Solow. It was built by the Diesel Construction Company. When constructed, the building was also referred to as "9 West" and "Tower 9". The building is 689 ft (210 m) tall, with 50 stories. Weidlinger Associates was the structural engineer and Code Consultants Inc. was the code consultant.

According to Solow, the building was designed to have "magnificent views" and areas for workers to relax because "such surroundings attract and keep good workers to such a degree that corporate tenants are willing to pay premium rents to get them". The building is distinguished by curved facades on its northern and southern elevations, which taper at higher stories. 9 West 57th Street was the first major structure in New York City to be developed with a sloped facade.

=== Form and facade ===
The north and south facades curve inward from ground level to the 18th floor, where it rises upward to the 50th story. The building is 64 feet (20 m) narrower at the 18th floor than at ground level. The massing is similar to the W.R. Grace Building, completed around the same time; the initial, rejected design of the Solow Building was used for the Grace Building. The sloped design came from an early concept in which the elevators were placed outside the main structural core, though this idea was not feasible. Bunshaft instead decided to use curved facades on the north and south elevations, avoiding the need for rectangular setbacks. One author compared the curves to the face of a ski slope.

The north and south walls are made of gray-tinted glass. Immediately above the ground level, the north and south elevations end in a large gutter, which collects rainwater. Custom rails were installed on the facade for the window-washing scaffolds. The glass panels consist of windows as well as spandrels in between stories. The panels are attached to the superstructure by black gaskets made of neoprene.

The western and eastern facades are clad in tan bands of travertine limestone. On either side is a narrow window opening spanning several stories. The building's structural steel bracing crosses diagonally in front of these windows. The sections of the steel bracing in front of the windows are coated with black aluminum.

=== Plaza ===
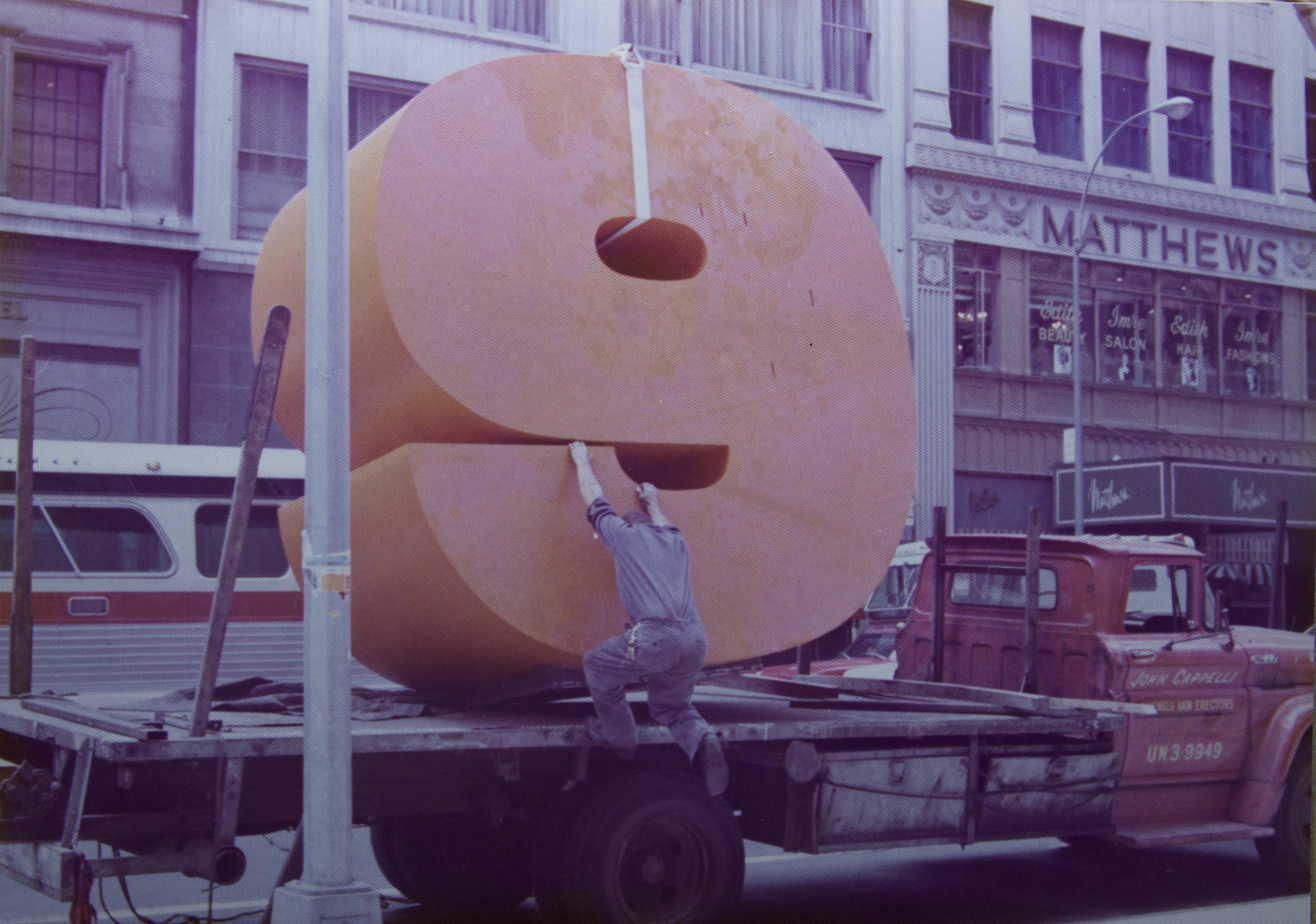
Moving of the orange "9" designed by Ivan Chermayeff to 9 West 57th Street

The building has a setback of 36 feet (11 m) from 57th Street and 49 feet (15 m) from 58th Street. A plaza extends in front of the building on both 57th and 58th Streets. The plaza is clad in travertine and extends the width of the block from 57th to 58th Streets.

A red sculpture of the digit "9" on the 57th Street side of the building was designed by Ivan Chermayeff. The sculpture weighs 6 short tons (5.4 long tons; 5.4 t) and measures about 10 feet (3.0 m) high by 5 feet (1.5 m) wide. It faces east toward Fifth Avenue and is supported by a three-story column in the basement. The sculpture was installed because Solow thought the plaza as designed was excessively large, and also because Solow wanted to draw attention away from the bare walls of other nearby buildings. The idea for the sculpture had come after Chermayeff had joked that the facade could be a "launching pad" for the "9". After the sculpture was first installed in 1972, Solow had removed the sculpture for a year due to a dispute over where it should be placed. He ultimately agreed to install the sculpture on the sidewalk, initially paying the city $1,000 annually in rent. By the 1990s, the sculpture was described in The New York Times as "a cultural artifact as well as the building's signature".

The 58th Street side of the plaza contains Moonbird, a sculpture by Joan Miró. The sculpture, originally commissioned in 1966, is 14 feet (4.3 m) tall and made of bronze. Solow installed Moonbird in 1994, saying that "it is one of my very favorite sculptures"; he already had a print of the same work. Before Moonbird was installed, the 58th Street side of the plaza had a 12-foot (3.7 m) "mobile" by Alexander Calder. Solow removed the mobile after realizing the work could fall onto pedestrians in the wind.

=== Features ===
==== Basement and lobby ====
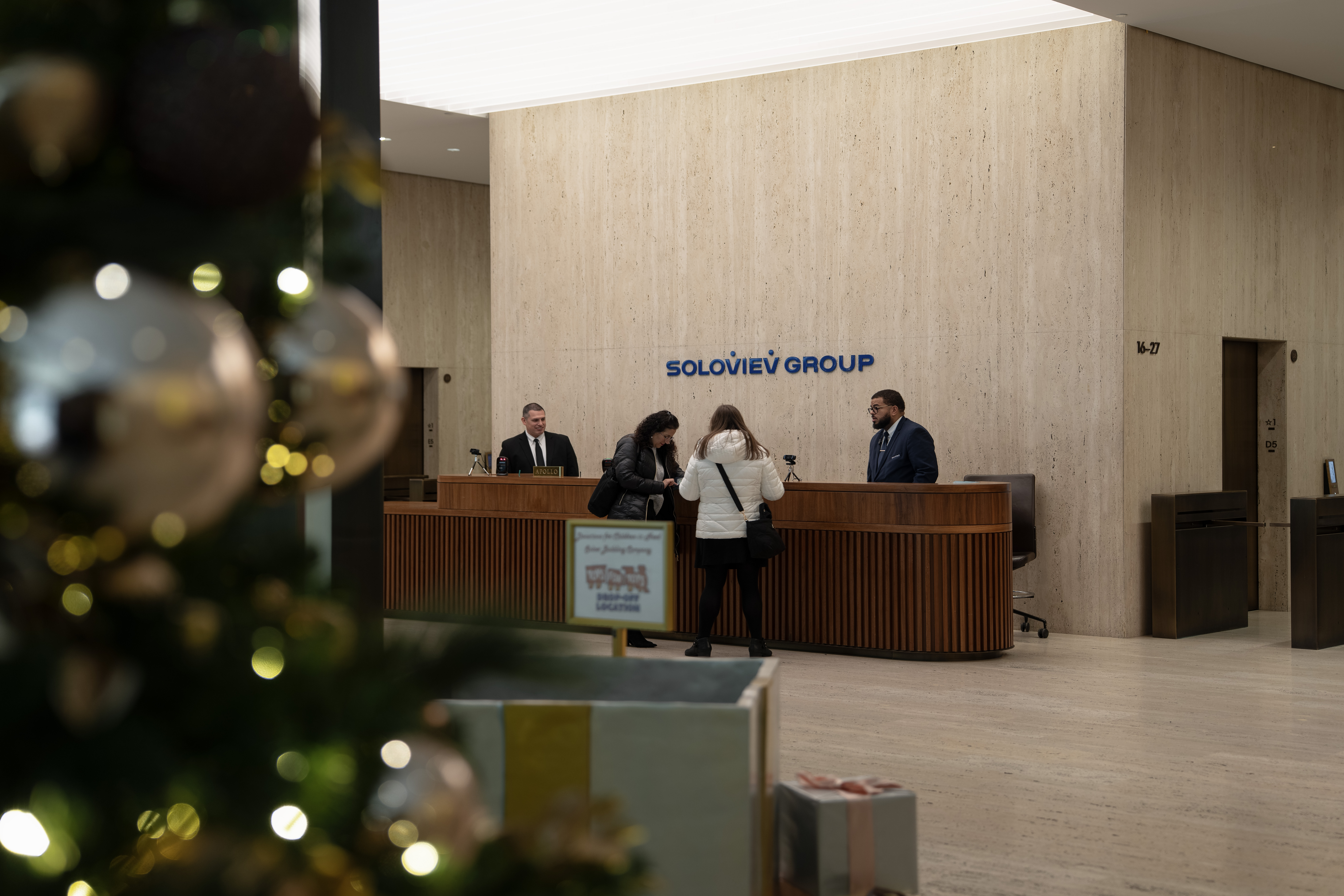
Lobby

9 West 57th Street is structurally supported by columns above the public plaza, creating the appearance of an arcade. Storefronts on either side were originally planned. Two basement shopping levels were originally connected to the plaza by two pair of escalators, one each on 57th and 58th Streets. The retail space, covering 45,000 square feet (4,200 m^{2}), remained empty for thirty years after the building's completion. Hardy Holzman Pfeiffer Associates then designed the Brasserie 8 1/2 restaurant in the space, which opened in 2000. The 230-seat restaurant covers 13,000 square feet (1,200 m^{2}) and is accessed by a stair inside a 275-square-foot (25.5 m^{2}) cylindrical entrance from the lobby. The basement also has a parking garage.

The lobby was designed to extend the entire block between 57th and 58th Streets, with glass walls on either side. The lobby is clad with marble. During the Solow Building's construction, Bunshaft had said that marble "is beautiful, it weathers beautifully and it expresses structure in design". Because Solow wanted to maintain an "exclusive aura", he banned tenants from using phones in the lobby. The 58th Street side of the lobby has a newsstand and a retail area.

The first floor also houses Solow's private art gallery, including works by Franz Kline, Henri Matisse, and Alberto Giacometti. The gallery is managed under the non-profit Solow Art and Architecture Foundation, which receives tax exemptions from being nominally open to the public. However, the gallery is perpetually closed, even to tenants. Some of the artwork was visible from the street despite being inaccessible. This prompted criticism and the creation of a parody website describing the gallery's operating hours as "Monday, inaccessible; Tuesday, closed; Wednesday, no public hours; Thursday, not open; Friday, same as the rest of the week; Saturday, none; Sunday, absolutely not". After Solow's death in late 2020, his widow Mia Fonssagrives-Solow announced she would open his art collection to the public.

==== Upper stories ====
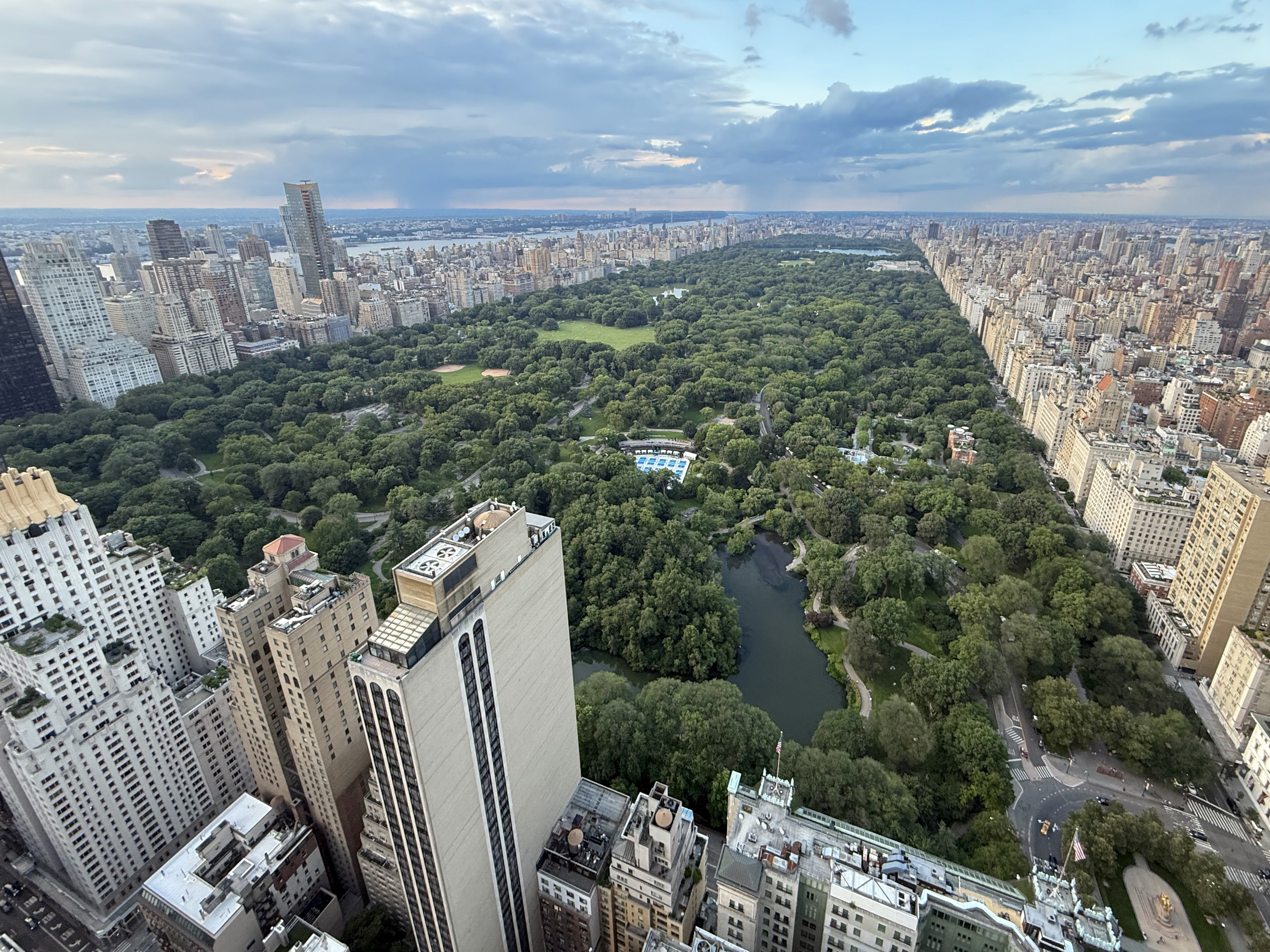
View of Central Park

The second floor was designed with a 26-foot (7.9 m) ceiling, although a 18,000-square-foot (1,700 m^{2}) mezzanine above the second floor was erected during the Solow Building's construction. Designed by Bernard M. Deschler for the Morgan Guaranty Trust Company, the mezzanine was installed because Morgan Guaranty wanted to keep its investment managers and research specialists near each other. The mezzanine hangs from the ceiling using metal alloy bars. The second floor and mezzanine is still marketed as a trading floor as of 2021. The fourth floor contains a two-story mechanical space, which is hidden on the exterior.

The typical upper story has a rectangular layout around a service core in the center, which contains the building's elevators and stairs. The upper stories are served by 24 elevators, which are divided into elevator banks serving different groups of floors. Above the 23rd story, the north facade has a direct view of Central Park. Overall, the tower has a gross floor area of about 1,400,000 square feet (130,064 m^{2}), with 33 elevators in total. There is about 20,000 square feet (1,900 m^{2}) of amenity space on the 27th floor, including a 40-seat coffee lounge and a meeting room for over 100 people. In addition, there is a health club with a salt room, fitness equipment, plunge pools, and a golf simulator. The upper stories also include a tenant-only restaurant, Vista.

== History ==
The Church of Jesus Christ of Latter-day Saints (LDS Church) had acquired the lots at 10–20 West 58th Street in 1962, with plans to build a skyscraper of between 30 and 40 stories. The LDS Church planned to rent some of the building's space as offices. The church had also acquired a site at 11 West 57th Street. Sheldon Solow started acquiring parcels on 57th and 58th Streets in 1965, hiring several brokers to avoid raising suspicion that he was assembling a large lot. Solow ended up acquiring 17 parcels, (Note: Including the LDS lot, he acquired 9–21 West 57th Street, as well as 10–26 and 36–40 West 58th Street.) including the LDS site, ultimately assembling a 54,000-square-foot (5,000 m^{2}) site between 57th and 58th Streets. While Solow could not outright buy 4 West 58th Street, he acquired a leasehold on the building, as well as air rights that allowed an increase in the size of his proposed skyscraper. Bergdorf Goodman's president Andrew Goodman refused to sell the store building or its air rights to Solow.

=== Construction ===
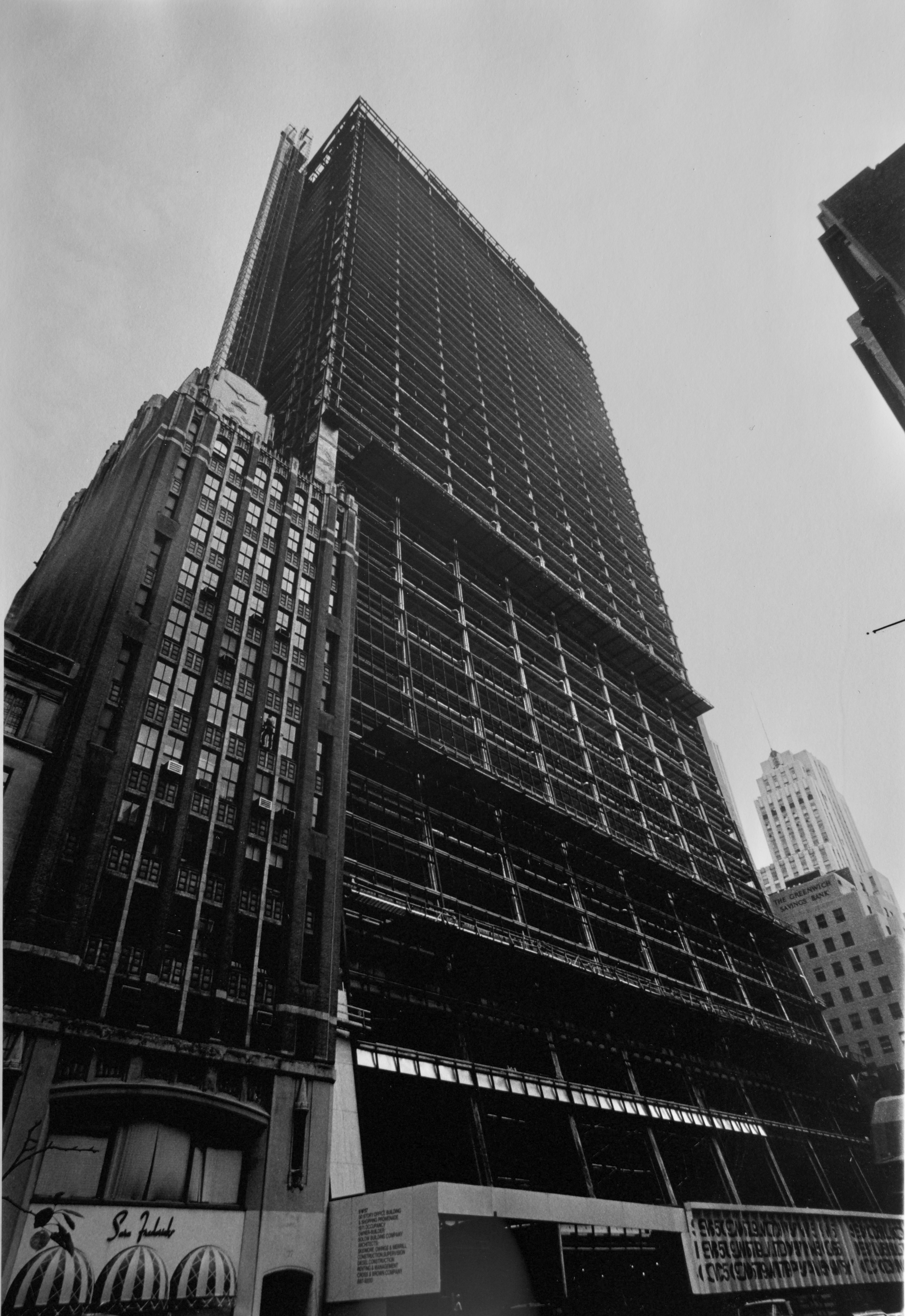
Facade of 9 West 57th Street during construction, January 1970

In August 1968, Solow announced that he had hired Gordon Bunshaft to design a 800,000-square-foot (74,000 m^{2}), 45-story building on the site. The LDS Church planned to take up four stories in the building. Solow's tower was planned to contain a wide base and curving facades, which tapered at higher stories. The lots at 36–40 West 58th Street were separated from the rest of the site by a parking lot, so Solow planned a 13-story, 225-space garage on these lots. The original design would have contained balconies on the east and west. By the end of that year, the building was increased to 47 stories and 1.1 million square feet (100,000 m^{2}). The LDS Church withdrew from the project due to a dispute over mortgage. Cosmetics company Avon Products decided to lease 20 stories in June 1969 and finalized the decision that November. In doing so, Avon abruptly canceled plans to relocate to Rockefeller Center, even though rent at the Solow Building was higher than that at Rockefeller Center, and even though Solow did not plan to allow Avon to formally name the building after itself.

Demolition on the site had begun in early 1969 when Solow acquired the lots at 30–34 West 58th Street, creating a continuous site for his development. As a result, the proposed building was redesigned yet again. In early 1970, Solow announced that his 50-story office building would contain 1.5 million square feet (140,000 m^{2}), a third of which was leased by Avon. By that April, Avon had increased its space to 700,000 square feet (65,000 m^{2}) across 25 floors. A corrugated 280-by-10-foot (85.3 by 3.0 m) sign was erected in front of the construction site. It was designed so it read "Solow Building Company" from one angle and "9 W 57" from another. By that October, the steelwork had reached the eighth floor. During construction, a dislodged crane hurt five workers, and two electricians died after falling down an elevator shaft. The building topped out in June 1971. Anne Healy designed a pair of seven-story-tall arrowheads for the topping-out event.

=== 20th century ===
Though 9 West 57th Street was completed when large numbers of companies were leaving New York City, Solow was not worried about the trend. Avon's offices had opened in August 1972 on the 9th to 34th floors. Another major lessee in the building was Morgan Guaranty (later J.P. Morgan & Co.), which rented 250,000 square feet (23,000 m^{2}) of office space in August 1973, occupying the 2nd floor and the 6th to 11th stories. The building was more than 80 percent occupied at that point. Other original tenants included the U.S. Shoe Corporation on the 40th floor; the National Shipping and Trading Corporation and the Lionel Corporation on the 41st floor; Sony Corporation of America on the 42nd and 43rd floors; and Chanel on the 44th floor. In its early years, the building attracted tenants such as Elf Aquitaine, the Commercial Bank of Australia, and Deutsche Bank.

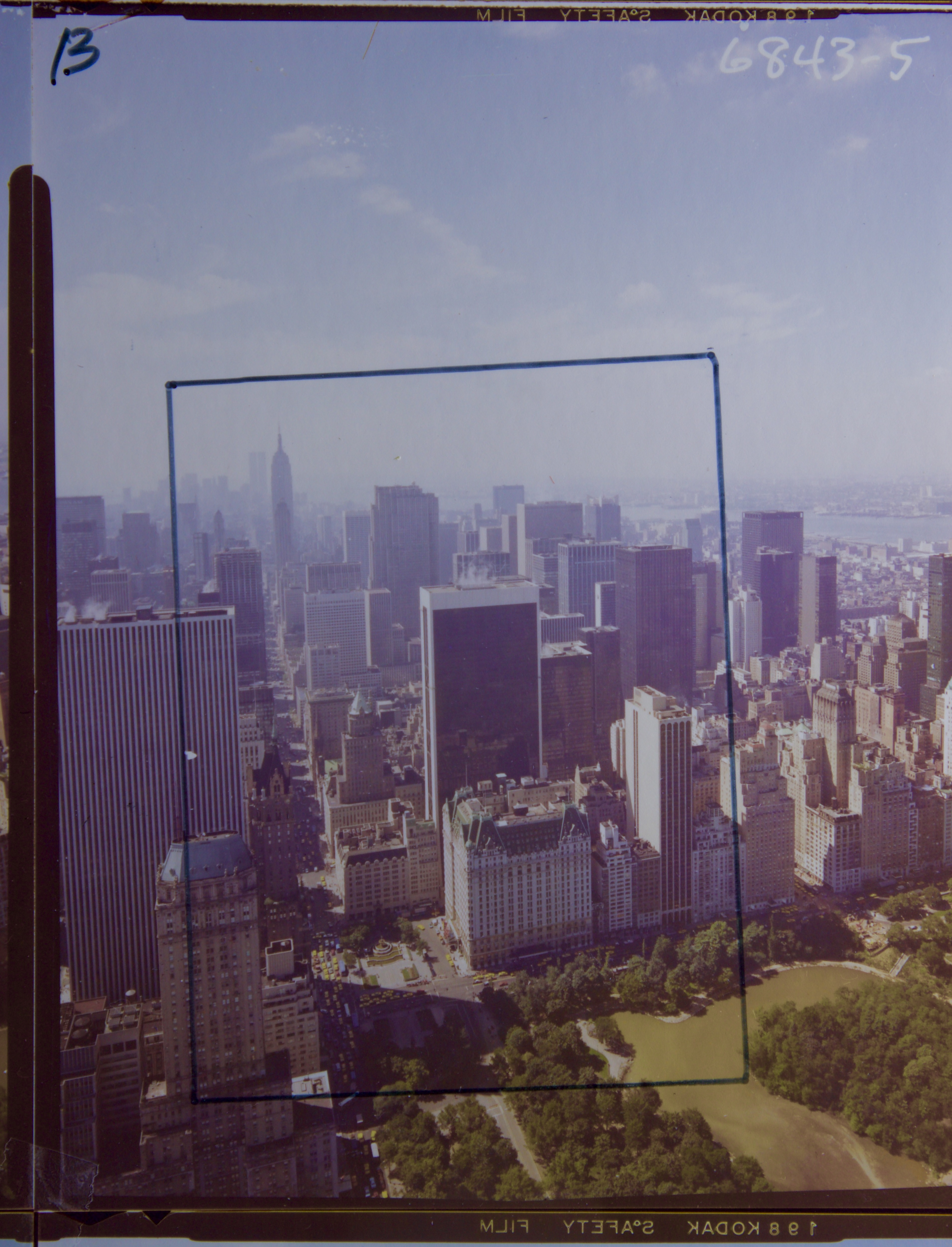
Contact sheet of 9 West 57th Street, 1970s

After its completion, 9 West 57th Street became one of New York City's most prestigious office buildings. By the late 1980s, the Solow Building, along with the General Motors Building and the Seagram Building, charged some of the city's highest rents. In spite of the fact that architects considered neither the General Motors Building nor the Solow Building to be architecturally distinguished, their proximity to Central Park allowed their respective owners to charge high rents. During the mid-1990s, when tenants at other office buildings in New York City were subleasing their space at a discount, space at 9 West 57th Street was being subleased at a premium.

By contrast, aside from banking tenants, the commercial space at the ground level and basements sat largely empty through to the end of the 20th century. The below-ground space had been meant for antique and art dealers and a restaurant. One factor in the commercial space's lack of tenants was that the ground-level storefronts were placed too far behind the street. Solow was also reluctant to actually rent the space, as he claimed he needed the right tenant. The first "right" tenant was Deutsche Bank, which opened a ground-floor banking space in 1979, about five years after the building was finished. The building's 60,000 square feet (5,600 m^{2}) of underground retail space had not seen a single tenant a decade later.

The late 1990s saw several high-profile departures, including those of Sony and J.P. Morgan & Co. Avon reportedly tried to buy 9 West 57th Street, but after Solow was unwilling to sell, Avon moved out at the end of its lease in 1997. Prior to formally moving out, Avon subleased some of its space. Most of Avon's old space was occupied by Nationsbanc Montgomery Securities, which had been acquired by NationsBank and then merged with BankAmerica Corporation, parent company of Bank of America. Nationsbanc Montgomery had 350,000 square feet (33,000 m^{2}) in 9 West 57th Street by December 1998, more than any other tenant in the building. Despite the departures, new tenants at the Solow Building continued to sign leases at premium rates. Concurrently, Solow had hired Hardy Holzman Pfeiffer to redesign the unused retail space in the basement. Two of the escalators were removed to make way for the entrance to the Brasserie 8 1/2 restaurant. The restaurant opened in 2000.

=== 21st century ===
==== 2000s and 2010s ====
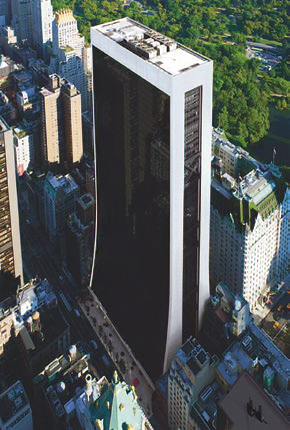
Aerial view of 9 West 57th Street from the southeast

Solow sought a $400 million loan for the building in February 2002, and Dresdner Bank gave him the loan that July. The Solow Building was still considered a desirable location into the 21st century, in part because of its Central Park views. When Solow refinanced the building in 2002, the building was 80 percent occupied and was estimated to earn $90 million a year in net operating income. In an unofficial listing of New York City skyscrapers in 2007, the New York Observer listed the Solow Building as one of the city's most expensive buildings. The top floors of the building were being marketed at $175 per square foot ($1,880/m^{2}) per year, while the average annual rent for "premium" Midtown office space was $85 per square foot ($910/m^{2}) per year. Nearby buildings such as 712 Fifth Avenue, the Carnegie Hall Tower, the General Motors Building, and 888 Seventh Avenue also had high asking rates.

Bank of America had taken space on the Solow Building's second floor and mezzanine, which had originally been designed as Morgan Guaranty's trading floor. Though the trading floor was able to fit 300 people, Solow had refused to make alterations to allow the bank to add 200 traders. After Bank of America moved to the Bank of America Tower in 2008, about half the building was empty for two years. By 2010, the top three floors were among the building's vacant spaces. This was a much higher vacancy rate than the citywide average, despite the building's luxury reputation and the ongoing Great Recession. The vacancies were in part because Solow asked much higher rates per square foot compared to nearby buildings, and he was obstinate in not charging lower rents. According to The New York Times, he asked one potential tenant $200 per square foot ($2,200/m^{2}), but he became "furious" when the tenant leased space at the General Motors Building at $130 per square foot ($1,400/m^{2}). In another case, financial services firm Natixis already occupied space on upper floors and wanted to rent the trading floor, but the firm reneged on its offer because Solow would not allow Natixis to expand the trading floor.

Though Solow was able to attract additional tenants over the next year, the building continued to face problems, including in 2011, when all but one of the elevators between the lobby and 27th floor simultaneously failed. The same year, two tenants signed large leases, and Solow refinanced the building with a $625 million commercial mortgage-backed security (CMBS) loan from Deutsche Bank. Within two years, rental rates at the Solow Building were among the highest in Manhattan. By 2016, the building was 64 percent occupied by 26 companies. The Solow Building, along with 520 Madison Avenue and 65 East 55th Street, were among the Midtown buildings charging high rents. This was part of a trend in which buildings typically occupied by hedge funds and investment firms charged higher rents. The same year, Solow refinanced the building with a $1.2 billion mortgage from JPMorgan Chase. The loan was used to pay back the older CMBS loan from Deutsche Bank. A July 2016 appraisal valued the building at over $3.4 billion, making the property one of the most valuable office buildings in Manhattan. Solow finally decided on lowering rental rates for some vacant space in late 2017 after several large tenants such as Kohlberg Kravis Roberts, Providence Equity, and Silver Lake left the building. By 2018, the building had a 70 percent occupancy rate; Solow's son, Stefan Soloviev, attributed the increased occupancy rate to his own actions.

==== 2020s to present ====
Following Sheldon Solow's death in 2020, Soloviev reorganized his late father's firm, and the newly constituted Soloviev Group took over operation of 9 West 57th Street. Soloviev added two swimming pools, several conference rooms, and a fitness center. Another restaurant, Cucina 8 1/2, replaced the old Brasserie restaurant in the basement in late 2021, and there were also plans to open the building's private art gallery to the public. By mid-2023, the building was 90 percent occupied, amid a general decline in office-building occupancy rates across New York City. The Real Deal attributed the building's high occupancy rate to its central location, as well as the fact that Soloviev was more involved with his tenants than his father had been. An amenity area on the 27th floor, and a health club, were completed in 2025 as part of a $40 million renovation. Kent Hospitality Group was hired that January to operate the tenant-only Vista restaurant. Billy Durney was also selected to operate a restaurant on the first floor, within the Brasserie space, which was to open later in 2025. Arch Amenities Group operated the health club and meeting spaces. By 2026, there was high demand for space in the building; one tenant had leased space on the northwest corner of the 50th floor overlooking Central Park that year for $327 per square foot ($3,520/m^{2}), which at the time was the highest per-square-foot rental rate recorded for any office space in Manhattan.

== Tenants ==
After 9 West 57th Street opened, many financial firms took space there, and the building became associated with finance. Companies with offices there included hedge funds and private equity organizations. One early tenant, shoe company Nine West, named itself after the building, which was the company's first location. As of 2024, law firms and hedge funds continue to occupy much of the space, including:

- Apollo Global Management
- Coatue Management
- Chanel
- Davidson Kempner Capital Management
- D1 Capital Partners
- Forty North Capital LLC
- Platinum Equity
- Sculptor Capital Management
- Tiger Global Management
- US Soccer
- Qatar Investment Authority

The corporate offices of Avis Budget Group (37th floor) are also located in the building.

== Legal disputes ==
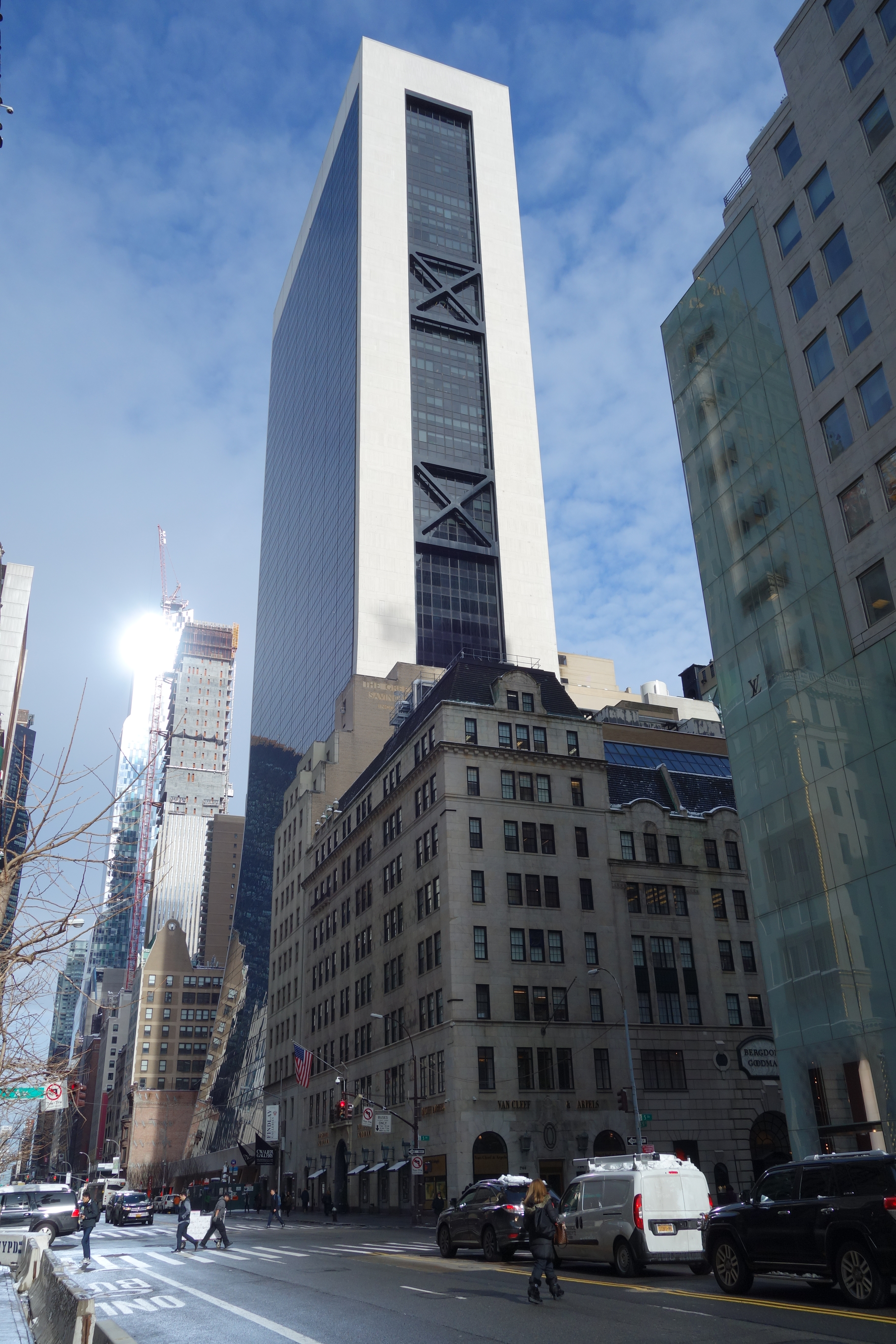
Seen from across Fifth Avenue

Sheldon Solow filed over 200 lawsuits during his lifetime, including several involving the Solow Building. The first such lawsuit involving the building was prompted when Solow refused to pay both Avon's broker and 9 West 57th Street's rental agent. Avon's broker Williams Real Estate sought its promised commission, as did Cushman & Wakefield, which held a contract with Solow as the building's exclusive rental agent. After a jury trial in State Supreme Court, in 1973, Solow was ordered to pay commissions of $150,000 to Cushman & Wakefield and $1.7 million to Williams. Solow aggressively protected the building's trademark, suing Avon in 1975 for publishing promotional materials that referred to 9 West 57th Street as the "Avon Building". The case remained dormant for two decades but was revived in the late 1990s, finally being dismissed in 2006.

During the late 1990s and early 2000s, several tenants were sued. Solow sued Avon in 1997, claiming it had failed to restore its offices in the building to their original condition. The case was settled out of court with a $6.2 million settlement. Solow, represented by David Boies, also sued JPMorgan Chase for not restoring its offices after moving out. In that case, the judge ruled against Solow, finding that JPMorgan had indeed tried to restore its space but that Solow had "substantially interfered" with JPMorgan's ability to do so. Solow sued W. R. Grace Company in 1999 for spraying asbestos on the building in the early 1970s, despite marketing the asbestos as a safe product. In addition, Solow and Bank of America had multiple legal disputes during the 2000s. In one such dispute, Solow had planned to evict the bank if one of the bank's former brokers was convicted of securities fraud, under a law that was normally used for evicting drug dealers and prostitutes.

== Critical reception ==
When the building's plans were announced, Progressive Architecture derided the proposal as a literal "block-buster", saying that it "guarantees to obliterate the scale and the street activity" of the art and retail district on 57th Street. Upon its completion, 9 West 57th Street received a large amount of criticism for its design. A New York Times critic wrote in 1972, "a complaint voiced more frequently that the curved design of 9 West 57th Street has little relationship to the erect walls of its neighbors". Ada Louise Huxtable wrote for the same newspaper: "One can only pity one half of the Hotel Plaza's guests facing that 58th Street black glass wall". Arthur Drexler, in a foreword to a book about SOM's work, wrote that the controversy over the Solow Building was largely "because it does not rise straight up from the street (as architects have taught everyone to expect)". The Fifth Avenue Association, which issued architectural awards to new buildings around Fifth Avenue in 1974, criticized the Solow Building as having "urban bad manners", even as it gave Chermayeff an award for his "9" sculpture and praised the building's design details.

Some of the criticism was directed toward the curved form in general. Paul Goldberger said that the Solow and Grace buildings both failed to "make certain gestures toward what exists around them". Jaquelin T. Robertson, the head of New York City's Office of Midtown Planning, likewise expressed his opposition to sloped structures, particularly those that were located in the middle of the block, as the Solow and Grace buildings both were. Architect Henry N. Cobb also described such buildings as having "a very strong, hostile, and aggressive visual impact". Upon Bunshaft's 1990 death, The New York Times wrote that the building was "cited by a civic group as a negative example of New York City architecture". Herbert Muschamp believed the traditional philosophy of form following function did not work for buildings like 9 West 57th Street, writing: "If this was honest architecture, as the modern movement had defined it, then perhaps it was time buildings learned how to tell pretty lies."

Not everyone disliked the design of the Solow Building; it was regarded largely positively by the public, which expressed interest in 9 West 57th Street's unusual shape. According to Drexler, "the immense curved glass wall is an exhilarating spectacle, not as architecture but as urban theater, as fascinating as a fountain". During the 1970s, the Solow Building was nicknamed the "bell bottom building" because of its shape. Architect Wallace Harrison also expressed his support for sloped buildings like the Solow Building, saying that the slope "gives a smooth line that appears to give added height by disappearing perspective".

== See also ==
- List of tallest buildings in New York City
- Chermayeff & Geismar & Haviv
