= Stefan Soloviev =

American businessman

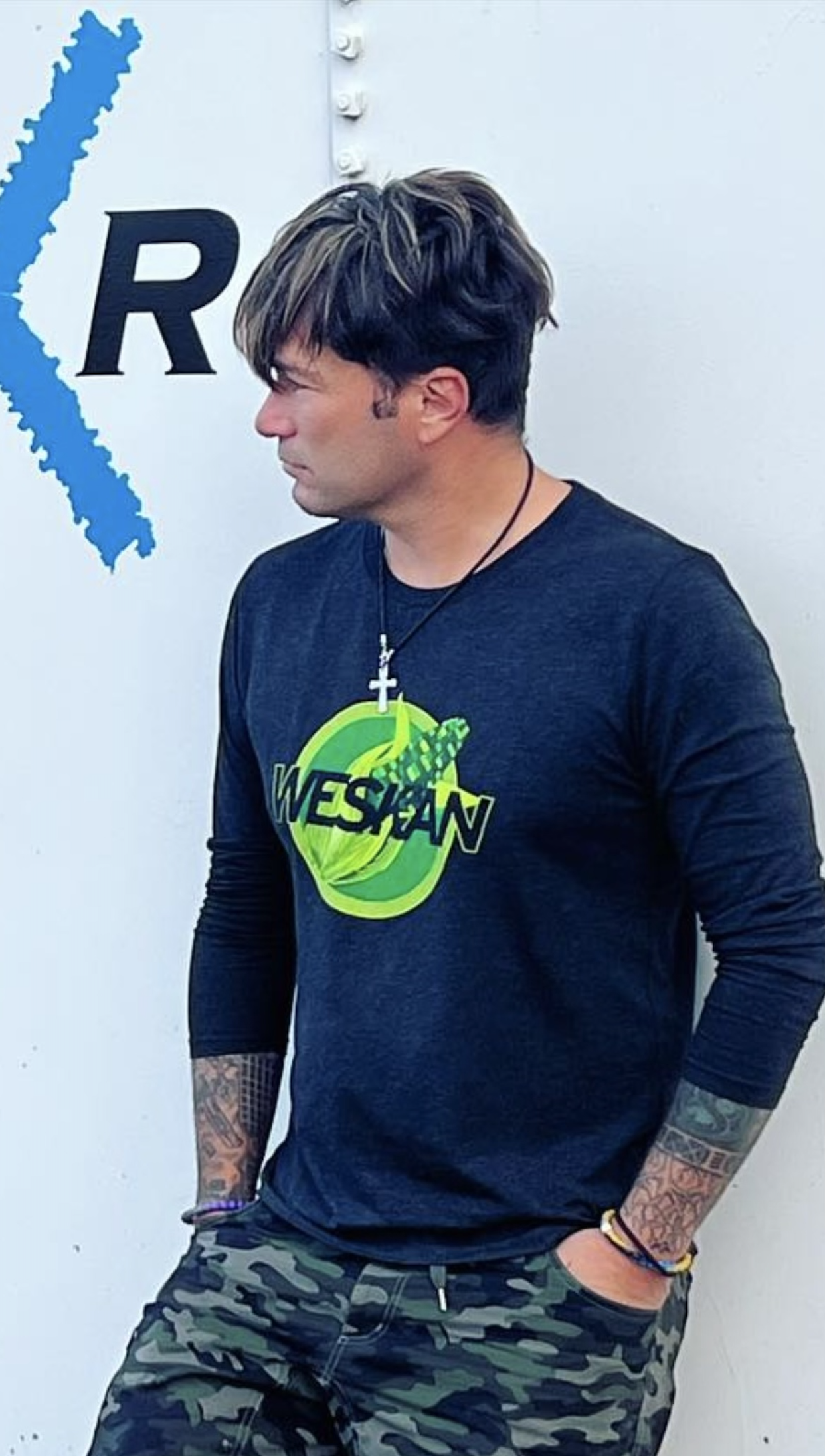
- Born: Stefan Quinn Solow; May 21, 1975 (age 50); New York City, U.S.
- Education: University of Rhode Island (dropped out)
- Occupation: Businessman
- Known for: Founder of Crossroads Agriculture
- Title: Chairman of The Soloviev Group
- Spouse: Stacey Soloviev (m. 1996; div. 2014)
- Children: 20+
- Parents: Sheldon Solow (father); Mia Fonssagrives (mother)
- Family: Fernand Fonssagrives (grandfather); Lisa Fonssagrives (grandmother)
- Website: solovievgroup.com

Stefan Quinn Soloviev (né Solow; born May 21, 1975) is an American businessman who is the chairman of the Soloviev Group, the parent company of Crossroads Agriculture, the Colorado Pacific Railroad, Weskan Grain, and related business entities. He formed Soloviev Group after combining his agriculture holdings and various businesses with his father’s Manhattan real estate. In 2025, Soloviev ranked 15th on the Land Report 100 list of the largest private landowners in the U.S. with 617,000 acres (250,000 ha) acres in Colorado, Kansas, and New Mexico. According to The Land Report, Soloviev’s land-related enterprises include dryland farming and ranching as well as renewable energy and short-line railroads.

== Early life ==
The elder son of Mia Fonssagrives and Sheldon Solow, Soloviev is of Russian descent on his father's side and Swedish descent on his mother's. He and his family are Lutheran. He grew up in Manhattan, New York, and attended the University of Rhode Island, but did not graduate. He briefly played football as a placekicker at St. John's University in 1996.

== Career ==
Soloviev began working in the family real estate business as a teenager, parking cars in his father's garages. He left the University of Rhode Island in the mid-1990s to trade commodities. He founded Crossroads Agriculture in 1999 to cultivate, purchase, store, and sell grains in the Wichita, Kansas region. In the early 2000s he expanded operations westward across Kansas into Colorado and New Mexico, where the company also developed a beef division beginning in 2004. As of 2021, Soloviev owns and operates farmland in Colorado, Kansas, New Mexico, Texas, and New York.

Beginning in the mid-2010s, Soloviev became involved in the 122-mile (196 km) Towner Line, a former Missouri Pacific Railroad route in eastern Colorado, after V&S Railway sought permission to abandon and dismantle the line. In 2016, he filed a feeder-line application under 49 U.S.C. §10907 asking the Surface Transportation Board (STB) to compel its sale. Local reporting later showed that V&S had begun removing track components in 2014 despite pending abandonment proceedings, which led the STB to force a sale of the line to Soloviev. After rehabilitation, the line reopened as the Colorado Pacific Railroad, operating between Towner and North Avondale Junction near Pueblo. Soloviev also formed Weskan Grain to integrate local agricultural operations with his rail network. A 2023 Colorado Sun report noted that he sought to use the Colorado Pacific Railroad to improve market access and pricing for himself and area farmers. In 2022, Weskan completed a shuttle-loading grain elevator with approximately 4 million bushels of concrete storage at Stockton Siding near Sheridan Lake, served directly by the Colorado Pacific Railroad, enabling 110-car unit train shipments to domestic flour mills and export markets via connections with the Union Pacific Railroad and BNSF Railway.

In 2022, Soloviev acquired the 150-mile (240 km) San Luis and Rio Grande Railroad out of bankruptcy and reorganized it as the Colorado Pacific Rio Grande Railroad (CXRG). In 2024 he acquired the 13-mile (21 km) San Luis Central Railroad, linking it with CXRG at Monte Vista. This brought his total ownership to 285 miles (459 km) of rail in Colorado.

== Personal life ==
In 1996, when he was 21, Soloviev married 18-year-old Canadian-born Stacey, whom he met in East Hampton, New York; they had 11 children together, including quadruplets, and divorced in 2014. She later managed several of his New York businesses including Peconic Bay Vineyards, the Chequit Hotel, and the group’s wine-bar operations.

Media reports differ on Soloviev’s total number of children. In 2018 he acknowledged four with two women in Sacramento, California. A 2022 Business Insider profile described him as having “at least 20” children, while a 2023 Real Deal profile referred to “20-plus.” A 2023 report on his Colorado operations put the figure at 22.
