= Fernand Fonssagrives =

American photographer (1910–2003)

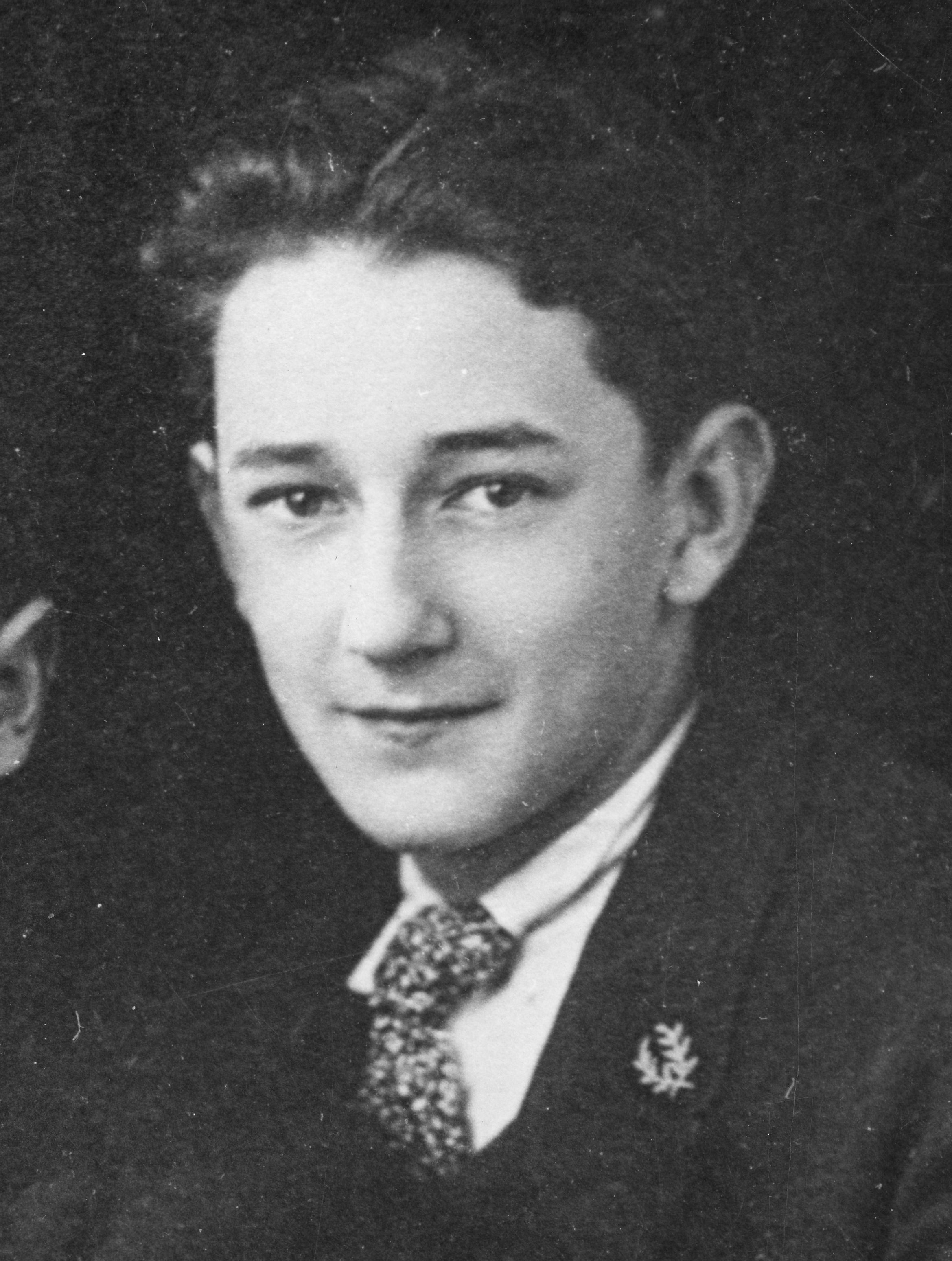
Fonssagrives in 1925

Fernand Fonssagrives (June 8, 1910 – April 23, 2003), born Fernand Vigoureux near Paris, was a photographer known for his 'beauty photography' in the early 1940s, and as the first husband of the model Lisa Fonssagrives. He died in 2003 at Little Rock, Arkansas, United States.

== Career ==
Born in France, Fonssagrives first trained as a dancer, but after an injury he established himself as a photographer, selling photos (often of his wife, Lisa) to many European publications in the 1930s. He moved to New York and became one of the world's premiere fashion photographers of the 1940s and 1950s, taking pictures for Vogue, Town and Country and Harper's Bazaar magazines. Some of his most iconic images are studies of female nudes with patterns of light on their skin.

Eventually he became disillusioned with the commercialization of his work, moved to Spain, and taught himself to sculpt. He later returned to the United States.

"My objective was to try to understand what life was all about and to be free", he said. "And there's no place you can do that but in America. This is why I am here—this passion to be an individual. It is possible in America, despite all these miserable trends. But you have to buck the system at times."

His photographic works are represented in Europe by Michael Hoppen Photography (London) and in the United States by Bonni Benrubi (New York) and Duncan Miller Gallery (Santa Monica).

== Personal life ==
His father was the French sculptor Pierre Vigoureux, whose sculptures for World War I war memorials are found throughout France and whose smaller works are held by museums including the Centre Pompidou. Fonssagrives' parents divorced when he was twelve and for unknown reasons he chose to use the surname of his mother (Jeanne Fonssagrives, daughter of Jean-Baptiste Fonssagrives, French acting Governor of Dahomey in 1899). His older brother, Jean Vigoureux, also became an artist, known for drawings and paintings of daily life in French Indochina and in Paris, as seen in the book Paris: Twenty-Eight Drawings by Jean Vigoureux (Plantin Press, Los Angeles, 1942).

Fonssagrives was married in 1935 to his first wife Lisa, whom he met at a dance school in Paris. He gave up dancing after he was injured in a diving accident. As a gift for recuperation, Lisa gave Fernand a Rolleiflex camera. It was this that introduced him to photography, Fernand becoming a noted photographer and Lisa Fonssagrives a highly celebrated fashion model. They divorced in 1949.

Fonssagrives's second marriage—to Diane Capron, a professional figure skater and teacher—also ended in divorce. The native Frenchman lived the last 30 years of his life in Little Rock, Arkansas.

Fonssagrives was survived by a daughter from his first marriage, Mia Fonssagrives-Solow, a sculptor and jewelry designer who was married to real estate developer and art collector Sheldon Solow, and a son from his second marriage, Marc Fonssagrives.

== Bibliography ==
- Fonssagrives, Fernand; Muir, Robin (essay), Fernand Fonssagrives; An Eye for Beauty (London: Guiding Light, 2003); ISBN 9780953845163
