= Pierre Vigoureux =

French sculptor (1884–1965)

Pierre Octave Vigoureux
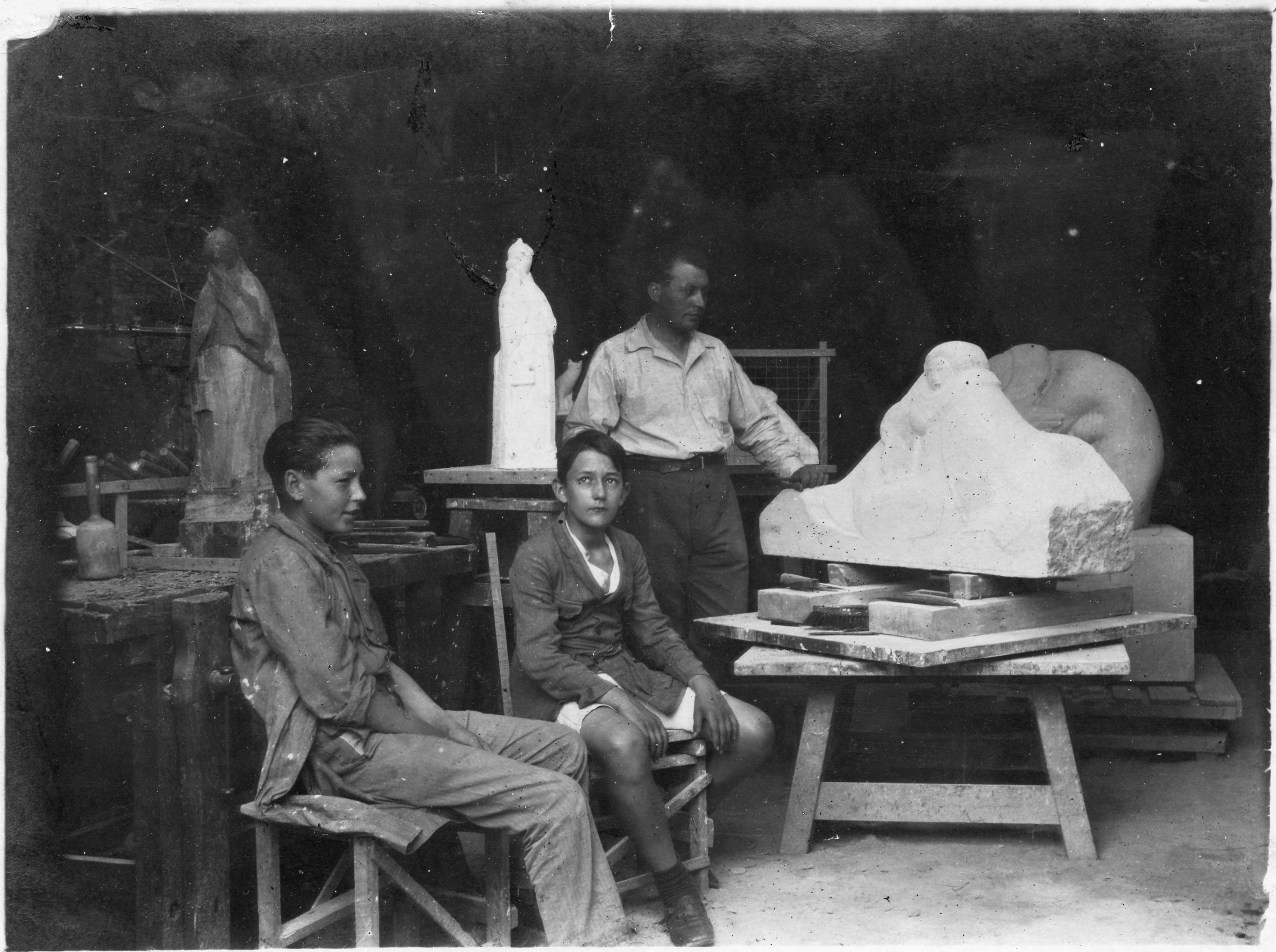
- Pierre Vigoureux with his sons in his sculpture workshop, c. 1920
- Born: April 4, 1884; Avallon, France
- Died: October 24, 1965 (aged 81); Nogent-sur-Marne, France
- Education: École nationale supérieure des arts décoratifs
- Occupation: Sculptor
- Children: 2, including Fernand Fonssagrives

Pierre Octave Vigoureux (4 April 1884 – 24 October 1965) was a French sculptor best known for his public monuments, war memorials, and religious sculpture. Active primarily during the interwar period, his work is represented in public spaces, museums, and churches across France.

== Early life and education ==
Vigoureux was born in Avallon, in the Yonne department. He began learning sculpture in his father's workshop and produced his first wooden sculptures around 1900. Encouraged by regional artists, he entered the École nationale supérieure des arts décoratifs in Paris in 1902, where he studied under Hector Lemaire.

== Career ==
Vigoureux first exhibited at the Salon des Artistes Français in 1906. After the First World War, he settled near Vézelay and later returned to Avallon, where he maintained a studio. From the early 1920s onward, Vigoureux received numerous public commissions, particularly for war memorials. Alongside commemorative sculpture, he produced religious works, including multiple statues of Joan of Arc for churches in Burgundy.

From 1935 to 1942, Vigoureux served as director of the École nationale des beaux-arts in Dijon. He was also appointed regional commissioner for the 1937 Paris International Exhibition. In 1950, he completed *La Muse du vin*, a state commission now held by the Musée d’Avallon.

== Personal life ==
Vigoureux married Jeanne Lise Marie Emma Fonssagrives in 1907. They later divorced, and he remarried in 1924. Through his first marriage, Vigoureux's son was Fernand Fonssagrives.

== Selected public works ==
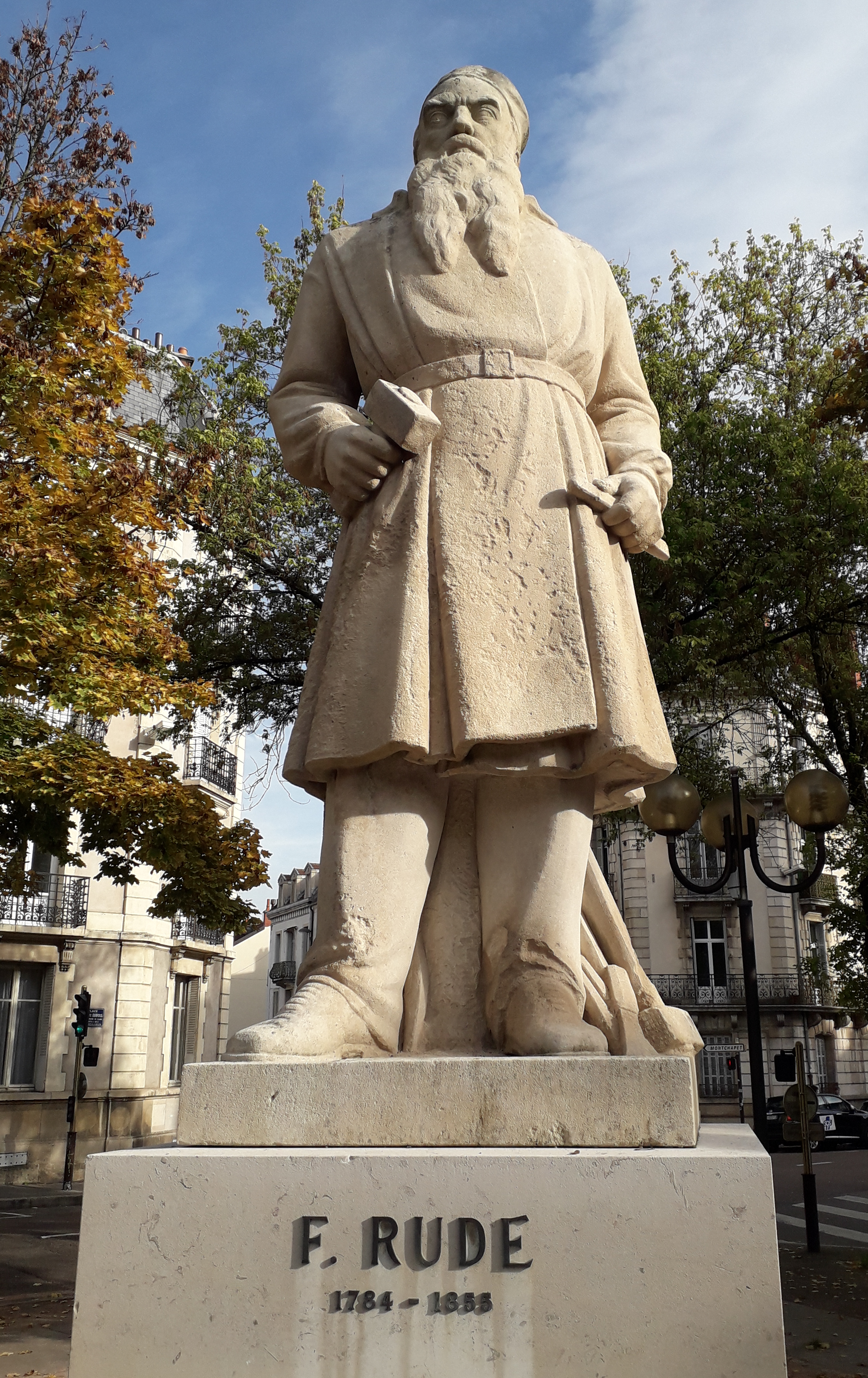
Monument to François Rude in Dijon

- *Amazone* (1927), bronze, Jardin des Plantes, Paris
- War memorial, Avallon (1921)
- War memorial, Vézelay (1923)
- *Monument à François Rude* (1953), Dijon
- *Notre-Dame-de-Lumière*, Domecy-sur-Cure
