= Irving Penn =

American photographer (1917-2009)

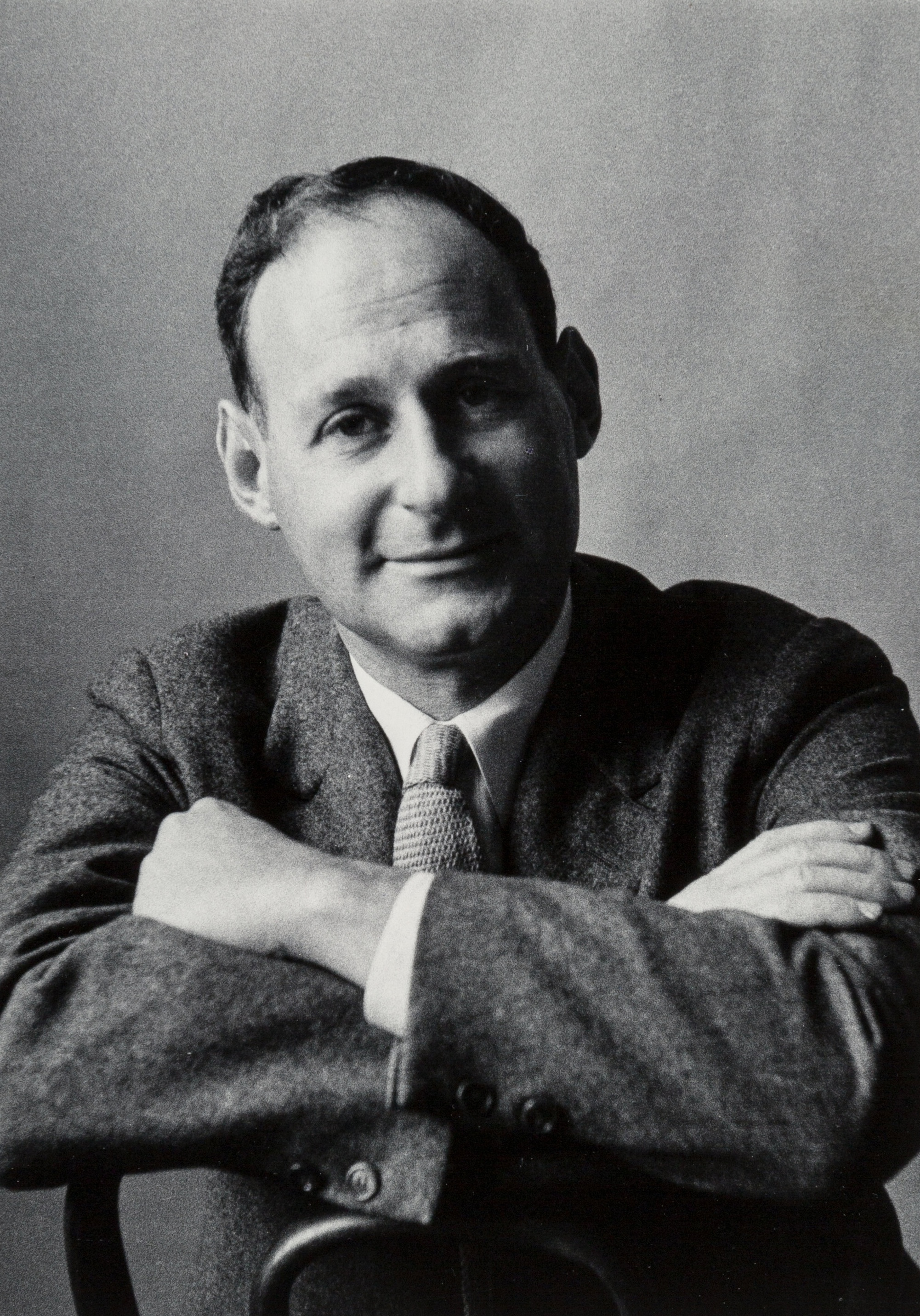
- Penn, c. 1958
- Born: June 16, 1917; Plainfield, New Jersey, U.S.
- Died: October 7, 2009 (aged 92); New York City, New York, U.S.
- Occupation: Photographer
- Spouse: Lisa Fonssagrives (m. 1950–1992) (her death)
- Children: 1
- Family: Arthur Penn (younger brother); Matthew Penn (nephew)

Irving Penn (June 16, 1917 – October 7, 2009) was an American photographer known for his fashion photography, portraits, and still lifes. Penn's career included work at Vogue magazine, and independent advertising work for clients including Issey Miyake and Clinique. His work has been exhibited internationally and continues to inform the art of photography.

== Early life and education ==
Penn was born to a Russian Jewish family on June 16, 1917, in Plainfield, New Jersey, to Harry Penn and Sonia Greenberg. Penn's younger brother, Arthur Penn, was born in 1922 and would go on to become a film director and producer. Penn attended Abraham Lincoln High School where he studied graphic design with Leon Friend.

Penn earned a diploma in 1938 from the Pennsylvania Museum School of Industrial Art (later the University of the Arts), where he had studied drawing, painting, graphics, and industrial arts under Alexey Brodovitch. While still a student, Penn worked under Brodovitch at Harper's Bazaar which published several of Penn's drawings.

== Career ==
Penn worked as a freelance designer for three years, taking his first amateur photographs before assuming Brodovitch's position as the art director at Saks Fifth Avenue in 1940. Penn remained at Saks Fifth Avenue for a year before leaving to spend a year painting and taking photographs in Mexico and across the US. When Penn returned to New York, Alexander Liberman offered him a position as an associate in Vogue magazine's Art Department. Penn worked on layout for the magazine before Liberman asked him to try photography.

Penn's first photographic cover for VOGUE magazine appeared in October 1943. The art department of the Office of War Information in London offered him a job as an "artist-photographer" but he volunteered with the American Field Service instead. After arriving in Naples with a boatload of American troops in November 1944. Penn drove an ambulance in support of the British Eighth Army as it alternately waited out weather and slogged its way north through a miserable winter in the Italian Apennines. In July 1945, he was transferred from Italy to India. He photographed the soldiers, medical operations, and camp life for the AFS, and various subjects while bivouacked in India. He sailed back to New York in November 1945.

Penn continued to work at Vogue throughout his career, photographing covers, portraits, still lifes, fashion, and photographic essays. In the 1950s, Penn founded his own studio in New York and began making advertising photographs. Over the years, Penn's list of clients grew to include General Foods, De Beers, Issey Miyake, and Clinique.

Penn met his first wife, Nonny Gardner from England, while both were students at the Pennsylvania Museum School of Industrial Art in Philadelphia. They married in 1940 and divorced in 1943. Penn met Swedish fashion model Lisa Fonssagrives at a photo shoot in 1947. In 1950, the two married at Chelsea Register Office, and two years later Lisa gave birth to their son, Tom Penn, who would become a metal designer. Lisa Fonssagrives died in 1992. Penn died aged 92 on October 7, 2009 at his home in Manhattan.

== Photography ==
"It is perhaps not too much to say that in Penn's prints the
descriptive resources of the photographic gray scale have
never been more fully exploited."

— —John Szarkowski

Best known for his fashion photography, Penn's repertoire also included portraits of creative greats; ethnographic photographs from around the world; Modernist still-life works of food, bones, bottles, metal, and found objects; and photographic travel essays.

Penn was among the earliest photographers to pose subjects against grey or white backdrop and he effectively used its simplicity. During his early years at Vogue as the magazine's art director, Penn developed a bold graphic sensibility that complemented his chic images and embodied modern taste. His use of monochromatic backdrops of black, white, or gray allowed him complete control of natural lighting conditions and enhanced the visual simplicity of his photographs. In an era when elaborate artificial lighting was the norm, his work stood out from the rest and influenced subsequent fashion photography. Expanding his austere studio surroundings, Penn constructed a set of upright angled backdrops, to form a stark, acute corner. Subjects photographed with this technique included John Hersey, Martha Graham, Marcel Duchamp, Pablo Picasso, Georgia O'Keeffe, W. H. Auden, and Igor Stravinsky.

Beginning in 1964, Irving Penn began experimenting with platinum printing. Penn had spent his career up to that point making photographs that were seen almost exclusively in reproduction within the glossy pages of magazines and in his pivotal 1960 book Moments Preserved. Penn set himself the challenge of producing photographic prints that would surpass the technical limitations of reprographic media and deliver a deeper visual experience. He was drawn to the antiquated platinum process for its long grayscale – its ability to display a seemingly infinite array of gradations between pure white and absolute black.

The platinum process requires direct contact with the negative, without enlargement, so Penn first needed to create flawless negatives the same size as the desired print. He then hand-coated paper with platinum emulsion. When dry, the paper was sandwiched with the negative and exposed to light before processing. Rigorous experimentation revealed that recoating a print with a secondary emulsion and making a second or third exposure of the same image on a single sheet of paper yielded prints of greater depth and subtlety. Penn solved the problem of aligning and re-aligning the negative and the print surface over multiple exposures by borrowing a technique from the graphic arts: he mounted his paper on a sheet of aluminum with a series of registration guides along the top edge. Penn was guarded about the preparation of his emulsions and his precise formulations varied considerably. He frequently introduced palladium and iron salts into his coatings to achieve desired effects.

Penn's still life compositions are sparse and highly organized, assemblages of food or objects that articulate the abstract interplay of line and volume. Penn's photographs are composed with a great attention to detail, which continues into his craft of developing and making prints of his photographs. Penn experimented with many printing techniques, including prints made on aluminum sheets coated with a platinum emulsion rendering the image with a warmth that untoned silver prints lacked. His black and white prints are notable for their deep contrast, giving them a clean, crisp look.

While steeped in the Modernist tradition, Penn also ventured beyond creative boundaries. The exhibition Earthly Bodies consisted of series of posed nudes whose physical shapes range from thin to plump; while the photographs were taken in 1949 and 1950, they were not exhibited until 1980.

He continued to capture collections by his favorite designers, such as John Galliano for Dior, Karl Lagerfeld for Chanel, and Christian Lacroix, for Vogue, incorporating these darker themes into his images.

== Exhibitions ==
- 1975: Irving Penn: Recent Works, Photographs of Cigarettes, Museum of Modern Art, New York
- 1975: I Platini di Irving Penn: 25 Anni di Fotografia, Galleria Civica d'Arte Moderna, Turin
- 1975: Irving Penn: Platinum Plates, The Photographers' Gallery, London
- 1977: Irving Penn: Street Material. Photographs in Platinum Metals, The Metropolitan Museum of Art, New York
- 1980: Exhibition at the Center for Visual Arts, Oakland, California
- 1984: Irving Penn, a retrospective, The Museum of Modern Art, New York
- 1987: Irving Penn, Fundación Juan March, Madrid, Spain
- 1986: Irving Penn: Printemps des arts de Monte Carlo, Monte Carlo
- 1990: Irving Penn: Master Images, National Museum of American Art and the National Portrait Gallery, Smithsonian Institution, Washington, D.C.
- 1990: Irving Penn: Platinum Test Material, Center for Creative Photography, University of Arizona
- 1994: Irving Penn: Collection Privée/Privatsammlung, Musée d'Art et d'Histoire, Fribourg, Switzerland
- 1995: Irving Penn Photographs: A Donation in Memory of Lisa Fonssagrives-Penn, Moderna Museet, Stockholm
- 1997: Le Bain: Dancers' Workshop of San Francisco, Maison Européenne de la Photographie, Paris
- 1997: Irving Penn: A Career in Photography, The Art Institute of Chicago
- 2001: Irving Penn: Objects (Still Lifes) for the Printed Page, Museum Folkwang, Essen
- 2002: Dancer: 1999 Nudes by Irving Penn, Whitney Museum of American Art, New York
- 2002: Earthly Bodies: Irving Penn's Nudes, 1949–1950, The Metropolitan Museum of Art, New York
- 2004: Dahomey (1967), The Museum of Fine Arts, Houston
- 2005: Irving Penn: Platinum Prints, the National Gallery of Art, Washington, D.C.
- 2008: Close Encounters, Morgan Library & Museum, New York
- 2009: The Small Trades, J. Paul Getty Museum, Los Angeles: a collection of 252 full-length portraits by Penn from 1950 to 1951
- 2010: Irving Penn Portraits, National Portrait Gallery (London): an exhibit of over 120 portraits of people from the worlds of literature, music and the visual and performing arts
- 2012: Irving Penn: Diverse Worlds, Museum of Modern Art (Moderna Museet), Malmö, Sweden
- 2013: Irving Penn: On Assignment, Pace Gallery, New York City, New York.
- 2015-2016: Irving Penn: Beyond Beauty, career retrospective of 146 photographs at the Smithsonian American Art Museum; traveled to the Dallas Museum of Art
- 2017: Irving Penn: Centennial, Metropolitan Museum of Art, New York City; Irving Penn - Le Centenaire, Grand Palais, Paris; retrospective organized by The Metropolitan Museum of Art, New York and The Réunion des musées nationaux– Grand Palais, in collaboration with The Irving Penn Foundation
- 2017: Resonance – Photographs from the Pinault Collection, Fotografiska Stockholm
- 2024: Irving Penn, de Young, Fine Arts Museums of San Francisco
- 2024: Irving Penn: Centennial, The MOP Foundation, A Coruña, Galicia, Spain
- 2026: Penn & Fashion, Maison Européenne de la Photographie (MEP), Paris, France

== Major collections ==
The Art Institute of Chicago holds the Irving Penn Paper and Photographic Archives, which were donated to the Ryerson and Burnham Libraries and the Department of Photography in 1995. In addition, the Art Institute of Chicago has more than 200 of Penn's fine art prints in its collection, and has mounted several exhibitions of work by the artist including the retrospective Irving Penn: A Career in Photography (1997–1998) which traveled internationally as well as Irving Penn: Underfoot (2013).

The Smithsonian American Art Museum (SAAM) possesses a large collection of Penn's works, including a silver gelatin print of Penn's The Tarot Reader, a photograph from 1949 of Jean Patchett and surrealist painter Bridget Tichenor. In 2013, the museum received 100 images as a gift from the Irving Penn Foundation, significantly increasing the number of Penn's works in the collection to 161 images. The Irving Penn Foundation's gift formed the basis of the exhibition, Irving Penn: Beyond Beauty, which was shown at SAAM before traveling to other museum venues around the United States.

In 2015, the Irving Penn Foundation promised more than 150 photographs representing Penn's career to the Metropolitan Museum of Art. These photographs formed the core of Irving Penn: Centennial, the Museum's 2017 exhibition organized with The Réunion des musées nationaux– Grand Palais. Variations of this show have been exhibited at the de Young, Fine Art Museum of San Francisco and the MOP Foundation in Galicia, Spain.

== Art Market ==
In April 2023, Phillips Photography auctioned "Harlequin Dress (Lisa Fonssagrives-Penn)" (1950) for the third highest price of the entire auction at $355,600. "Cuzco Children" (1948) also sold for above high estimate $95,250.

== Awards ==
- 1987: The Cultural Award from the German Society for Photography (DGPh)

== Bibliography ==
- Moments Preserved. 1960
- Worlds in a Small Room. 1974. ISBN 978-0-670-79025-8
- Inventive Paris Clothes, 1909–1939. 1977. ISBN 0-670-40067-X
- Flowers. 1980. ISBN 0-517-540746
- Passage. 1991. ISBN 0-679-40491-0
- Drawings. 1999. ISBN 0-9665480-0-0
- The Astronomers Plan a Voyage to Earth. 1999. ISBN 0-9665480-1-9
- Irving Penn Regards The Work of Issey Miyake. 1999. ISBN 0-224-05966-1
- Still Life. 2001. ISBN 0-8212-2702-5
- A Notebook at Random. 2004. ISBN 0-8212-6192-4
- Photographs of Dahomey. 2004. ISBN 3-7757-1449-9
