= Lisa Fonssagrives =

Swedish model (1911–1992)

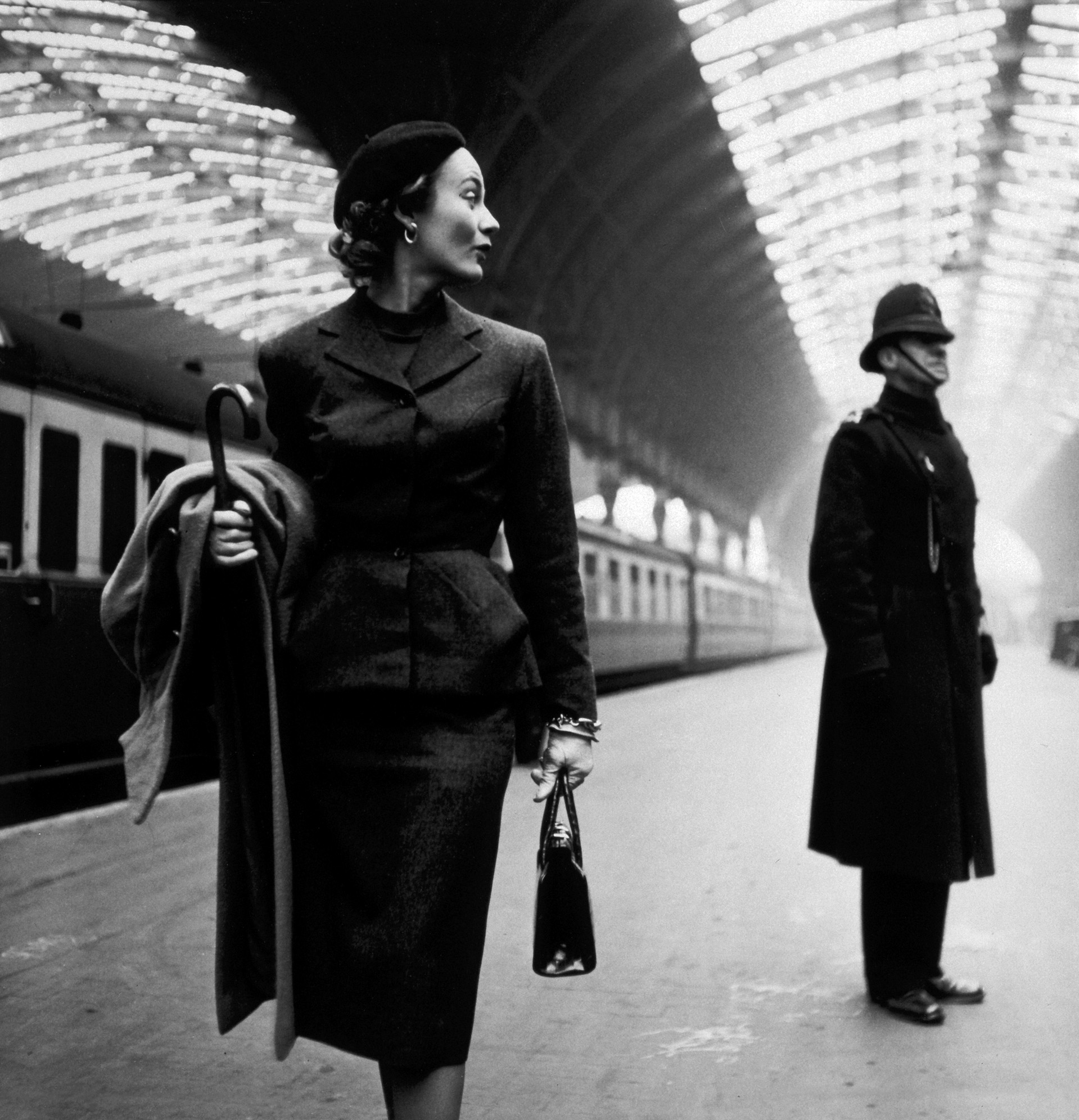
- Fonssagrives photographed by Toni Frissell, 1951
- Born: Lisa Birgitta Bernstone; 17 May 1911; Västra Götaland County, Sweden
- Died: 4 February 1992 (aged 80); New York City, U.S.
- Other name: Lisa Fonssagrives-Penn
- Occupations: Supermodel; dancer/dance teacher; photographer; sculptor
- Spouses: Fernand Fonssagrives (m. 1935; div. 1949); Irving Penn (m. 1950)
- Children: 2, including Mia Fonssagrives-Solow
- Modeling information
- Height: 1.70 m (5 ft 7 in)
- Hair color: Blonde

Lisa Fonssagrives (born Lisa Birgitta Bernstone; 17 May 1911 – 4 February 1992) was a Swedish model, dancer, sculptor, and photographer. She is widely credited with having been one of the first supermodels.

== Biography ==
Lisa Fonssagrives was born Lisa Birgitta Bernstone on 17 May 1911 in Sweden Uddevalla. As a child, she took up painting, sculpting and dancing. She went to Mary Wigman's school in Berlin and studied art and dance. After returning to Sweden, she opened a dance school. She moved from Sweden to Paris to train for ballet (after participating with choreographer Astrid Malmborg in an international competition) and worked as a private dance teacher with Fernand Fonssagrives, which then led to a modeling career. She would say that modeling was "still dancing".

While in Paris in 1936, the photographer Willy Maywald saw her in an elevator and asked her to model hats for him. The photographs were then sent to Vogue, and the photographer Horst P. Horst took some test photographs of her. In July 1939, she appeared in the German illustrated weekly Der Stern and was photographed also by André Steiner.

Before Fonssagrives came to the United States in 1939, she was already a top model. Her image appeared on the cover of many magazines during the 1930s, 1940s and 1950s, including Town & Country, Life, Time, Vogue, and the original Vanity Fair. She was reported to be "the highest paid, highest praised, high fashion model in the business". Fonssagrives once described herself as a "good clothes hanger".

Fonssagrives worked with many noted fashion photographers, including George Hoyningen-Huene, Man Ray, Erwin Blumenfeld, George Platt Lynes, Richard Avedon, and Edgar de Evia. She married Parisian photographer Fernand Fonssagrives in 1935; they divorced in 1949. She married American photographer Irving Penn in 1950 and became his muse.

After her modeling career ended, she designed a leisurewear clothing line for Lord & Taylor. She went on to become a sculptor in the 1960s and was represented by the Marlborough Gallery in Manhattan.

Fonssagrives died, aged 80, in New York, survived by her second husband, Irving Penn, and her two children: her daughter Mia Fonssagrives-Solow, a fashion and jewelry designer and sculptor who was married to real estate developer and art collector Sheldon Solow, and her son, Tom Penn, a designer.

The Lisa Fonssagrives-Penn Trust was founded in 1994.

In 1995, a retrospective exhibition of her work was held at Moderna Museet in Stockholm. Irving Penn donated photographs to the museum in her memory.

The Elton John photography collection auction, held by Christie's on 15 October 2004, sold a 1950 Irving Penn photograph of Fonssagrives for $57,360.

== Bibliography ==
- Fonssagrives, Fernand; Muir, Robin (essay), Fernand Fonssagrives; An Eye for Beauty, London: Guiding Light, 2003.
- Lisa Fonssagrives-Penn: Bronzes (exhibition catalogue), New York: Marlborough Gallery, Inc., 1983.
- Lisa Fonssagrives-Penn: Sculpture, Prints and Drawings (exhibition catalogue), Lisa Fonssagrives-Penn Trust, 1994.
- Gross, Michael: Model: The Ugly Business of Beautiful Women, New York: W. Morrow, 1995, ISBN 0-688-12659-6
- Seidner, David (ed): Lisa Fonssagrives: Three Decades of Classic Fashion Photography, New York: Vendome Press, 1996, ISBN 0-86565-978-8
