= Christopher Merrill (businessman) =

American real estate investment manager

Christopher Merril
- Born: 1971 (age 54–55); Okinawa Island, Japan
- Other name: Topher
- Education: Roanoke College, Cass business school
- Occupations: Real estate investment manager, business executive
- Spouse: Peyton Merrill
- Children: 3

Christopher "Topher" Merrill (born 1971) is an American real estate investment manager and business executive who is the co-founder and Global CEO of Harrison Street Asset Management. A real estate, infrastructure, and private credit investment management firm that he established with former Motorola Inc. chairman and CEO Chris Galvin and his brother Michael Galvin in 2005.

== Early life and education ==
Merrill was born in Okinawa, Japan, in 1971, where his father was serving as a doctor in the Army. Shortly after his birth the family returned to Illinois. Merrill earned his BA in Economics from Roanoke College, where he played on the golf team, and also worked part-time at a commercial bank. He received his MBA from the Bayes Business School (formerly known as CASS School of Business) in London, England.

== Career ==
Merrill started his career at global real estate investment management firm Heitman, where he launched Heitman's first foreign investment fund, and eventually became a partner and managing director.

After living in London for five years, Merrill returned to Chicago in 2005 to establish Harrison Street together with Chris Glavin and his brother Michael, who provided the seed money. In 2018, Colliers International Group Inc. (CIGI) purchased the Galvin's interests in Harrison Street. In July 2025, Colliers announced that it would rebrand its entire investment management division as Harrison Street Asset Management and appointed Merrill as Global CEO, thereby making him the largest individual shareholder at the time.

== Personal life ==
Merrill and his wife, Peyton, are involved in various Chicago community efforts through their work with First Tee, PanCAN, and Rush Hospital. They have three children together. Merrill is also known by his nickname, “Topher”.

== Board positions ==
- Merrill serves as Vice Chair on the board of the Pension Real Estate Association (“PREA”)
- Merrill is also on the boards of Rush University Medical Board (Facilities Committee), TCU Center for Real Estate, Roanoke College, the real estate advisory boards of Gore Creek and Kinship Capital, Salisbury School. He also served on the boards of the University of Wisconsin and Chicago Botanic Garden.
- He is a Trustee of the First Tee and on the board of the Chicago Chapter.
- Merrill is a member of YPO, Economic Club of Chicago and Chicago Commonwealth Club and the Real Estate Roundtable.

== Awards & Recognition ==
- Recipient of the prestigious 2025 Horatio Alger Award.
- Recognized on Crain’s Chicago Business’ Who's Who in Chicago Business 2024 and 40 Under 40 List in 2009.
- Recognized as “Industry Figure of the Year - Global” by PERE as part of its 2022 awards series.
- In January 2013, Real Estate Forum named Merrill as one of “Chicago’s Real Estate Icons."
