= Bachelder =

Bachelder is a surname. Notable people with the surname include:

- Chris Bachelder (born 1971), American writer
- John B. Bachelder (1825–1894), American portrait and landscape painter, lithographer, and photographer
- Joseph Bachelder III (1932–2020), American executive compensation lawyer
- Myrtle Bachelder (1907–1997), American chemist and educator
- Nahum J. Bachelder (1854–1934), American politician
- Stephen Bachiler (c. 1561–1656), early proponent of "Separation of church and state" and progenitor of many Bachelder and Batchelder families

== See also ==
- Batchelder
- Bachelor, a man above the age of majority who has never been married
