= Harrison Street Asset Management =

Real estate investment firm

- Trade name: Harrison Street
- Formerly: Harrison Street Real Estate Capital
- Type: Subsidiary
- Industry: Investment management
- Founded: 2005; 21 years ago
- Founders: Christopher Merrill; Christopher Galvin; Michael Galvin
- Headquarters: River Point, Chicago, Chicago, U.S.
- Key people: Christopher Merrill (Chairman & CEO)
- AUM: US$100 billion (Q4, 2025)
- Number of employees: 600 (2026)
- Parent: Colliers International
- Website: www.harrisonst.com

Harrison Street Asset Management, which uses the trade name Harrison Street, is a real estate investment firm headquartered in Chicago, Illinois. The firm is the investment management unit of Colliers International.

In 2024, Harrison Street ranks as one of the top five owners in senior housing in the U.S.

== Background ==
In 2005, Harrison Street was founded by former Heitman LLC executive Christopher Merrill, former Motorola CEO Christopher Galvin and his brother, Michael, both grandsons of Motorola's founder Paul Galvin. The firm was named for the location in which Motorola was founded, on Harrison Street. Its first fund, Harrison Real Estate Partners I raised $75 million in 2006.

In the 1990s back when he was Head of Heitman LLC's overseas investment business, Merrill made bets on Central European real estate in the years following the Fall of the Berlin Wall. When he returned to the U.S. in 2000, he realized that noncyclical events made the best investment catalysts as they could get higher risk-adjusted returns and would be more shielded from economic downturns. As a result, Harrison Street focused on investments in areas such as self-storage and student housing. During the 2008 financial crisis, while the firm didn't make a lot of money, it preserved capital as student housing occupancy was at 93% and the storage sector also performed well as shown with Public Storage's strong cash flows. This was in contrast to traditional real estate properties that had significant losses.

Harrison Street would later focus on investing in the health care sector. Senior housing specifically assisted living facilities became the majority of the portfolio. The rest of the health care portfolio consisted of medical office buildings.

In January 2011, Harrison Street acquired Transwestern Securities Management, the REIT subsidiary of Transwestern for an undisclosed price. The deal allowed Harrison Street to enter the REIT business.

In May 2018, Collier International acquired a majority 75% stake in Harrison Street for $550 million. The Galvins sold their ownership of Harrison Street while Merrill remained as its largest individual shareholder. The sale meant more Harrison Street employees could get ownership of the firm.

During the COVID-19 pandemic, Harrison Street did not experience the same disruptions as its peers which focused on office, retail or hospitality assets due to factors such as social distancing. During that period Harrison Street invested in medical facilities which it believed was essential to patients during the pandemic.

In January 2022, it was reported that Harrison Street would enter the market for single-family homes built specifically for renters via a $1.5 billion joint venture with Core Spaces. This was in contrast to Harrison Street's strategy used so far which avoided traditional real estate such as apartments, offices and retail buildings.

In July 2025, Collier International restructured its entire investment management business to be under the Harrison Street brand. These would include its companies: Basalt Infrastructure Partners, Versus Capital, Rockwood Capital, and Colliers Global Investor. The new unit would be named Harrison Street Asset Management.

== See also ==
- Colliers International
- Motorola
- Heitman LLC
