= Bob Galvin =

American businessman (1922–2011)

- Born: Robert William Galvin; October 9, 1922; Marshfield, Wisconsin, U.S.
- Died: October 11, 2011 (aged 89); Chicago, Illinois, U.S.
- Education: University of Notre Dame; Illinois Institute of Technology
- Title: CEO of Motorola
- Term: 1959–1986
- Predecessor: Paul Galvin
- Successor: George M.C. Fisher
- Spouse: Mary Barnes Galvin (m.1944)
- Children: 4, including Christopher
- Father: Paul Galvin
- Awards: Henry Heald Award (1996); IEEE Founders Medal (2000); Vannevar Bush Award (2005)

Robert William Galvin (October 9, 1922 – October 11, 2011) was an American business executive. He was the son of the founder of Motorola, Paul Galvin, and was the CEO of Motorola from 1959 to 1986.

== Motorola career ==
Born in Marshfield, Wisconsin, Galvin went to work for Motorola in 1940. He graduated from the University of Notre Dame in 1944. In 1956 he was named the president of the company. Two years later he succeeded his father as a chief executive officer.

In 1986, Galvin gave up the title of CEO while remaining chairman of the board. Under his leadership, Motorola sales had grown from $216.6 million in 1958 to $6.7 billion in 1987 and cash flow per share had grown from 89 cents to $6.10. Galvin also was instrumental, along with Dr. Mikel J Harry and Motorola engineer Bill Smith, in implementing the Six Sigma quality system at Motorola.

As a result of the Six Sigma program, Motorola received the first Malcolm Baldrige National Quality Award in 1988, which is given by the president of the United States. Later, the Six Sigma processes subsequently were adopted at the General Electric Corporation. Jack Welch said: "Six Sigma changed the DNA of GE." The Six Sigma process requires 99.99967% error free processes and products, or 3.4 parts per million defects or less.

== Other initiatives ==
In 2005, Galvin created the Galvin Electricity Initiative, a nonprofit organization dedicated to transforming the electrical grid so that it meets with Six Sigma standards of quality.

Along with his two sons Christopher and Michael, Galvin started a real estate investment firm, Harrison Street Real Estate Capital, named for the street where his father and uncle started Motorola (originally named "Galvin Manufacturing").

== Awards ==
Galvin was a longtime supporter of Illinois Institute of Technology and became a trustee in 1953. He was chairman from 1979 to 1990 and sat on three steering bodies on the future of IIT, in 1975, 1985, and as chairman in 1993. At the time of his death, he was a University Regent. In 1990, IIT presented Galvin with an honorary Doctor of Humane Letters degree, and in 1996, he received the university's Henry Heald Award. IIT dedicated the Paul V. Galvin Library in 1985 to recognize the Galvin family's commitment to the institution.

In 1985, Galvin received the Golden Plate Award of the American Academy of Achievement. In 1991, Galvin was inducted into Junior Achievement's U.S. Business Hall of Fame. In 1993, he received the Bower Award in Business Leadership. In 2000 he was awarded the IEEE Founder's Medal for "For his distinguished leadership in promoting quality, technological excellence and' cooperation between government and the private sector, and expanding the applications of electronics and communications technology globally." In 2005, he was awarded the Vannevar Bush Award for "his visionary leadership to enhance U.S. innovation, competitiveness, and excellence at the interface of science and technology with the Nation's industrial enterprise. In the counsels of government, industry, and academe, he unselfishly gave the Nation the benefit of his knowledge, experience, and creative wisdom while leading his company in its great contribution to the computing and telecommunications transformation of society." In 1995, he received the Chicago History Museum "Making History Award" for Distinction in Civic Leadership. Galvin was inducted into the Wireless Hall of Fame, in 2000, for his role in the cellular industry.

== Personal life ==
Galvin lived in Barrington, Illinois with his wife, Mary Barnes Galvin. Together they have four children and thirteen grandchildren. Galvin, who was a devout Catholic, died in October 2011 in Chicago, Illinois.

== Bibliography ==
- America's Founding Secret: What the Scottish Enlightenment Taught Our Founding Fathers (2002)
- Perfect Power: How the Microgrid Revolution Will Unleash Cleaner, Greener, and More Abundant Energy (2008)

Business positions
Preceded by Paul Galvin	CEO of Motorola; 1959–1986	Succeeded by George M.C. Fisher
