= Batchelder =

Batchelder is a surname. Notable people with the surname include:

- Alice M. Batchelder (born 1944), American attorney and jurist
- Charles Foster Batchelder (1856–1954), America ornithologist
- Clifton Batchelder (1909–2001), American politician from Nebraska
- Ernest A. Batchelder (1875–1957), American artist and professor
- Esther Batchelder (1897–1987), American educator and specialist in nutrition
- George Washington Batchelder (1826–1910), American politician from Minnesota
- George A. Batchelder, American politician from Arizona
- Hiram Batchelder (1838–1911), American politician, President of the Chico Board of Trustees, the governing body of the city of Chico, California from 1873 to 1876.
- James Batchelder (died 1854), United States Marshal, killed in the line of duty
- John Putnam Batchelder (1784–1868), American physician
- Warren Batchelder (1917–2007), American animator
- William F. Batchelder (1926–2019), American jurist, Justice of the New Hampshire Supreme Court
- William G. Batchelder (1943–2022), American politician, Speaker of the Ohio House of Representatives

== See also ==
- Batchelder House (Pasadena, California), historic home in Pasadena, California, USA
- Batchelder House (Reading, Massachusetts), historic home in Reading, Massachusetts, USA
- Mildred L. Batchelder Award an award granted annually by the ALA, it seeks to recognize translations of children's books into the English language, with the intention of encouraging American publishers to translate high quality foreign language children's books and 'promote communication between the people of the world'.
- Bachelder
