= Paul Galvin =

Paul Galvin may refer to:

- Paul Galvin (Gaelic footballer) (born 1980), Kerry Gaelic footballer
- Paul Galvin (businessman) (1895–1959), founder of Motorola
