= Mikel Harry =

American author and Consultant

Dr. Mikel J. Harry
- Born: December 28, 1951; Anderson, Indiana, United States
- Died: April 25, 2017 (aged 65); Chandler, Arizona, US
- Monuments: Dr. Mikel J Harry Museum, Colombo, Sri Lanka
- Education: Ball State University, Arizona State University
- Occupations: Chairman, SSMI
- Organization: Dr. Mikel J Harry Six Sigma Management Institute Inc.
- Known for: Six Sigma
- Children: 2
- Website: www.mikeljharry.com

Mikel J. Harry (born: December 28, 1951; died: April 15, 2017) was a prolific author who is credited for developing Six Sigma, along with Bill Smith. Harry was sometimes referred to as the 'father of Six Sigma'. One of his books, Six Sigma: The Breakthrough Management Strategy Revolutionizing the World’s Top Corporations (published by Crown Business, 2000) has been on the bestseller list of The Wall Street Journal, Bloomberg Businessweek and Amazon.com. He graduated with a PhD from Mary Lou Foulton Teachers College.

At the age of 65, he died on 25 April 2017, in Chandler, Arizona.

== Bibliography ==
=== Books ===
- Mikel J. Harry; J. Ronald Lawson (1992). Six Sigma Producibility Analysis and Process Characterization. Addison-Wesley. ISBN 9780201634129.
- Mikel J. Harry; Jack Prins (1993). Six Sigma Metrics.
- The vision of six sigma: tools and methods for breakthrough. Sigma Pub. Co. 1994. ISBN 9780964355538.
- The Vision of Six Sigma: Tools and Methods for Breakthrough. Tri Star-Boze Publications. 1997. ISBN 9780964355576.
- Mikel J. Harry; Reigle Stewart (1988). Six Sigma Mechanical Design Tolerancing. Motorola University Press. ISBN 9781569460160.
- Mikel J. Harry; Richard Schroeder (2000). Six sigma: Prozesse optimieren, Null-Fehler-Qualität schaffen, Rendite radikal steigern. Campus-Verlag. ISBN 9783593365510.
- The Nature of Six Sigma Quality. Motorola University Press. 1988. ISBN 9781569460092.
- Six SIGMA. Six SIGMA. 2001.
- Mikel J. Harry; Don R. Linsenmann (2006). The Six Sigma Fieldbook: How Dupont Successfully Implemented the Six Sigma Breakthrough Management Strategy. Doubleday. ISBN 9780385504669.
- Mikel J. Harry; Richard L. Hulbert; Christopher Jay Lacke; Ofelia C. De Hodgins, Prem S. Mann (2010). Practitioner's Guide to Statistics and Lean Six Sigma for Process Improvements. John Wiley & Sons. ISBN 9781118210215.

== Awards and recognition ==
Mikel J. Harry received the lifetime Engineering Excellence Award from Arizona State University in 2002. He was inducted into the "Who's Who" Registry of Global Business Leaders in 1993.

== See also ==
- Six Sigma
- Bob Galvin
- Bill Smith (Motorola engineer)
