= 685 First Avenue =

Residential skyscraper in Manhattan, New York

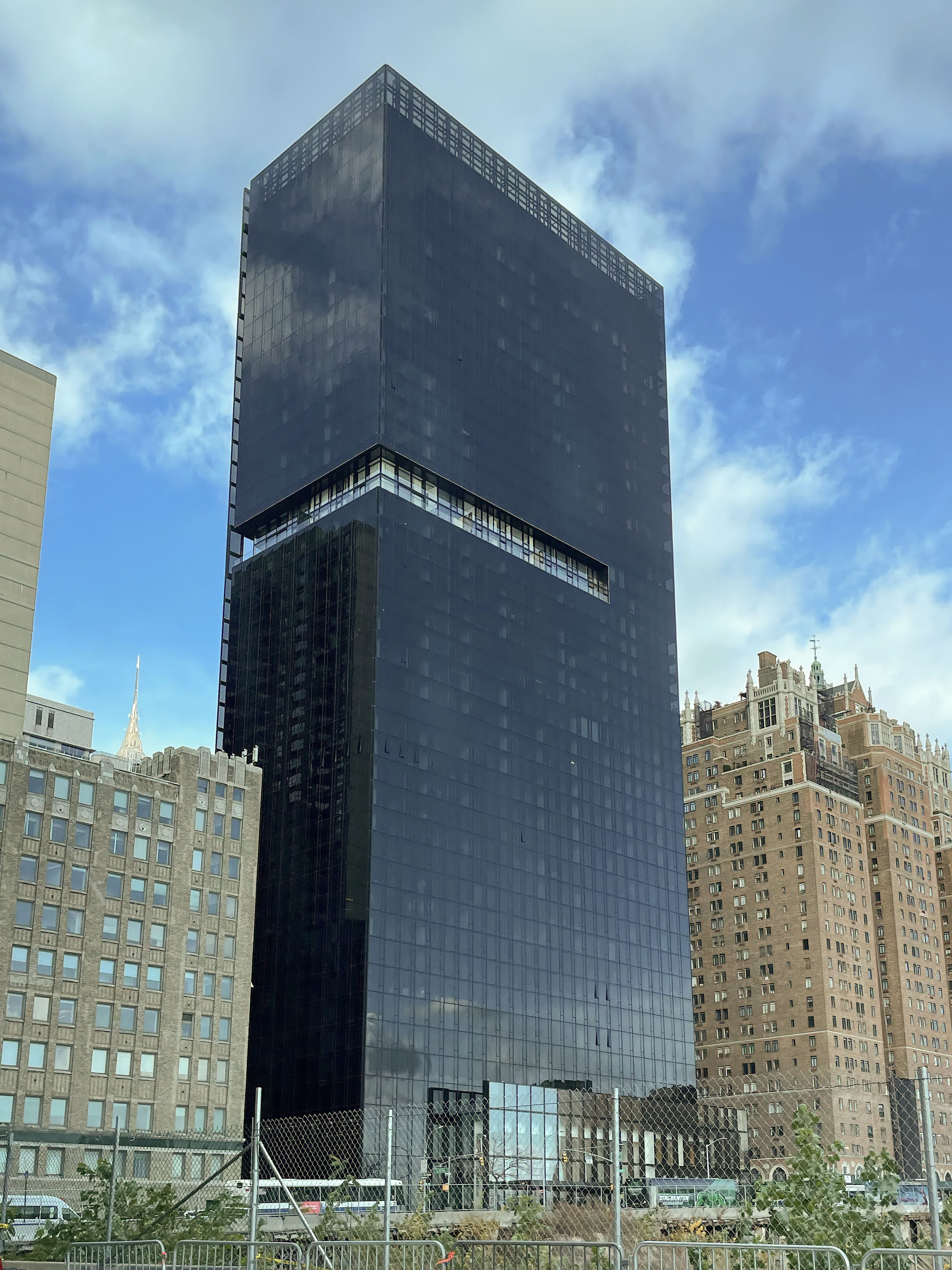
- The building from the southeast in 2021
- Interactive map of the 685 First Avenue area
- Alternative names: One United Nations Park

General information
- Architectural style: Neomodern
- Location: 685 First Avenue, Manhattan, New York City, New York, United States
- Coordinates: 40°44′51″N 73°58′17″W
- Year built: 2016–2019
- Owner: Solow Realty & Development, GO Partners (rental units)
- Operator: FirstService Residential (condominiums)

Height
- Height: 460 ft (140 m)

Technical details
- Floor count: 42
- Floor area: 765,590 sq ft (71,126 m^{2})

Design and construction
- Architecture firm: Richard Meier & Partners
- Developer: Sheldon Solow

Other information
- Parking: 110 spaces

Website
- 685first.com oneunpark.com

685 First Avenue is a residential skyscraper located on the west side of First Avenue between 39th and 40th streets in the Murray Hill neighborhood of Manhattan in New York City, New York, United States. Completed in 2019, the high-rise was architect Richard Meier's first all-black building and tallest project in New York City. It was also the first building constructed by developer Sheldon Solow on a group of four properties that he had purchased from Con Edison in 2005 following the decommissioning of the Waterside Generating Station. The condominium portion of the residential tower is named One United Nations Park.

== History ==
=== Site acquisition and rezoning ===
The building is located on a 32,365-square-foot (3,007 m^{2}) land lot with a frontage of 197.5 feet (60.2 m) on First Avenue and a frontage of 163.9 feet (49.9 m) on 39th and 40th streets. The site was originally part of a larger land lot owned by Con Edison that occupied a full city block that extended further west to Tunnel Approach Street; the block included an electrical substation and a parking lot that were built by Con Edison in the mid-1980s. The parking lot on the eastern portion of the block was listed for sale by Con Edison in 1998 along with two other properties the utility company owned along the east side of First Avenue—including the block between 35th and 36th streets and the block between 40th and 41st streets.

Con Edison later combined the sale of the three parcels with a fourth property located on the east side of First Avenue between 38th and 40th streets after it planned to decommission the Waterside Generating Station located on that site. More than 20 bids for the four properties were received by Con Edison; the winning bid was submitted by a development team that included Sheldon Solow and the Fisher Brothers with backing from Morgan Stanley Dean Witter & Co. Although the site at 685 First Avenue had already been zoned to allow for retail and residential development, the other three properties were zoned for manufacturing and would require zoning changes through the city's Uniform Land Use Review Procedure (ULURP) to permit the development of commercial and residential land uses. Con Edison also needed to obtain approval from the New York Public Service Commission in order to expand the capacity of the East River Generating Station at 14th Street to make up for the closure of the Waterside Generating Station. In 2000, Con Edison entered into a contract to sell the properties to FSM East River Associates, a partnership consisting of the Fisher Brothers, Solow and Morgan Stanley; it closed on the sale of the parcels in 2005, which included the property at 685 First Avenue and the unused air rights for the adjacent electrical substation.

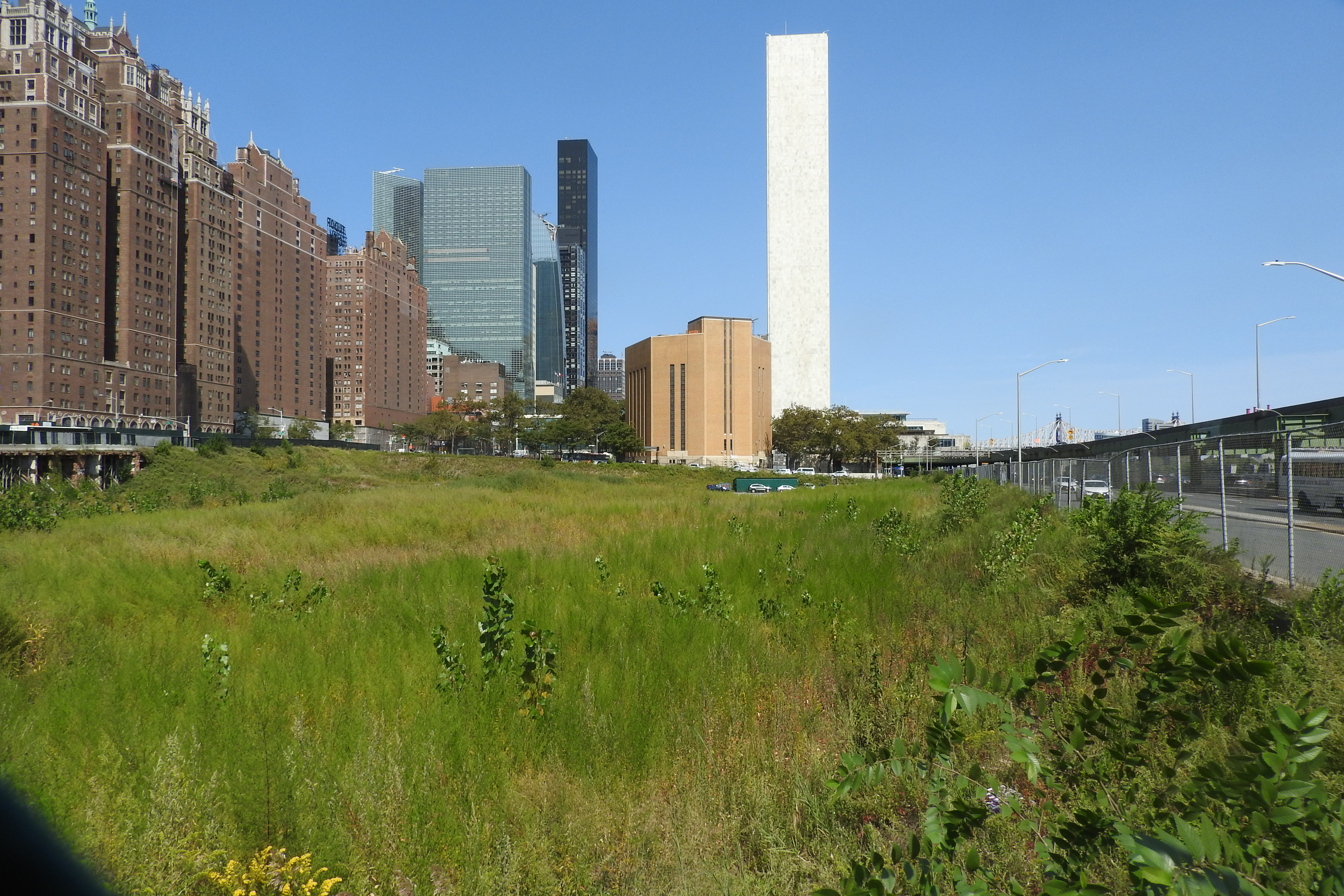
The vacant plot of land located across from 685 First Avenue in 2020, which includes the Waterside Generating Station site. Meier had worked on the master plan to redevelop this plot.

A master plan for the redevelopment of the four-acre (1.6 ha) plot of land across from 685 First Avenue, which included the former site of the Waterside Generating Station, was completed in 2005 by architects Richard Meier and David Childs. Initial plans for the redevelopment of the former Con Edison sites called for a 69-story, 721-foot-tall (220 m) residential tower to be built at 685 First Avenue. A rezoning of the four properties was approved in 2008; as part of the ULURP process, modifications by the City Planning Commission and City Council reduced the height of the building proposed at 685 First Avenue to a maximum of 462 feet (141 m).

By 2007, Solow had taken over full control of the redevelopment project after the Fisher Brothers left the partnership. The project stalled due to the 2008 financial crisis and Richard Meier updated the master plan in 2012. Prior to redevelopment, the property at 685 First Avenue initially functioned as a staging area for demolition work and environmental remediation efforts on the other former Con Edison parcels and was later used as a parking lot.

=== Construction and opening ===
In August 2015, Solow filed plans with the New York City Department of Buildings to construct a 42-story building at 685 First Avenue. The new high-rise was the first of the former Con Edison properties to be developed by Solow, after he had sold off parts of the block between 35th and 36th streets to the School Construction Authority and JDS Development in 2010 and 2013, respectively, which were redeveloped into P.S. 281 (the River School) and the American Copper Buildings. The project was also Solow's first residential development to incorporate condominiums. Solow had previously focused on developing rental buildings, but turned to the use of condominiums at 685 First Avenue following the expiration of the state's 421-a tax exemption program.

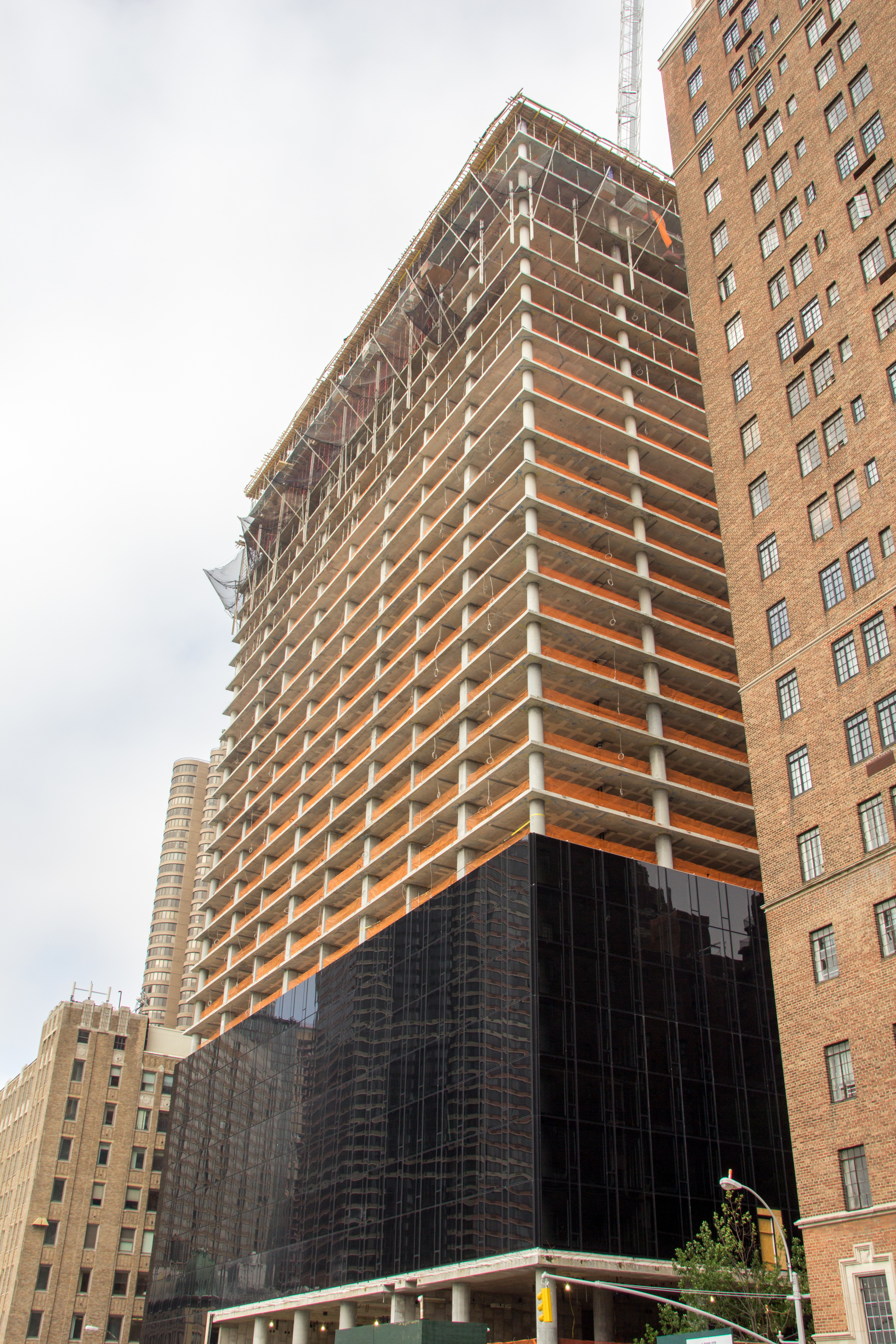
685 First Avenue under construction in May 2017

Construction of 685 First Avenue began in March 2016 and the building topped out in September 2017. Rising to a height of 460 feet (140 m), it was Meier's tallest project in New York City. The use of the architect's name was planned to be an important marketing strategy for the new development; however, when sales for condominium units launched in March 2018, Meier's name was removed from the building's marketing materials in response to allegations of sexual harassment made by five women who had worked with the architect and Meier taking a leave of absence from his firm. Leasing of the rental units began in January 2019 and residents began moving into the building. That same year, the condominium portion of the residential tower was rebranded as "One United Nations Park" to improve marketing, reflecting its location two blocks south of the headquarters of the United Nations.

In 2021, the building's underground parking garage became the first property to use an incentive program offered by Con Edison to install Level 2 charging stations for electric vehicles. After Solow died in November 2020, his firm sold the 408 rental units at 685 First Avenue for $387.5 million to a joint venture of Black Spruce Management and Meyer Orbach called GO Partners. The purchase was made in 2022 and part of an acquisition of 1,766 units in six Manhattan buildings from the Solow Realty & Development Company. In 2024, a penthouse condominium at 685 First Avenue was sold as a sponsor unit by the Soloviev Group to the government of Ireland for $8.5 million to serve as the residence of Fergal Mythen, who was serving as the country's United Nations ambassador. The duplex unit included four bedrooms and a private internal elevator.

== Architecture ==
=== Exterior ===
685 First Avenue was Meier's first all-black glass building. The facade consists of a black glass curtain wall and black metal panels. The use of a black curtain wall was specifically requested by Solow, as all of his buildings were black. Meier agreed to deviate from his traditional white palette given his close personal relationship with Solow; the men had been partnering on the master plan since 2005, and both had houses near each other in East Hampton. The building's black glass windows were fabricated in Germany and provide uniformity in the facade, blocking views of interior curtains and drapes as well as offering privacy to residents, while appearing transparent from inside the building.

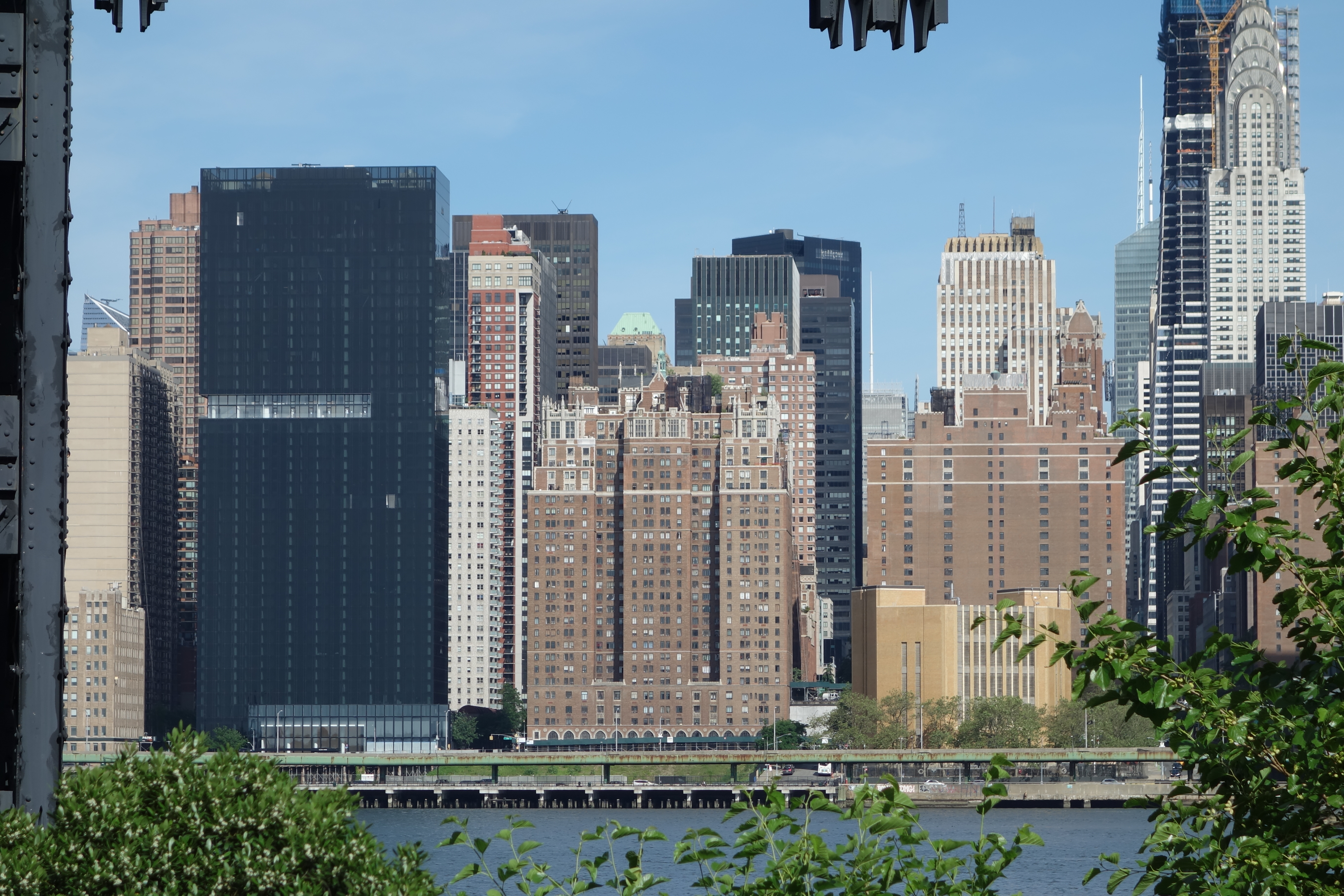
View from Long Island City in 2019, showing the niche on the 28th and 29th floors of the all-black building

On the east and south facades of the building, the dividing point of the rental units on the lower levels and the condominiums on the upper levels is visually defined by a niche with clear glass windows on the 28th and 29th floors, which provides terraces for duplex units and is also visible from across the East River at night from the interior lighting within the apartments. The west facade contains 69 balconies overlooking Midtown Manhattan, which were advocated by Solow's son Stefan Soloviev; a second black glass curtain wall is provided along portions of the facade to partially enclose the balconies, providing residents with privacy and protection from weather conditions. A porte-cochère is located at the rear of the building and provides access to the building's underground parking garage.

=== Interior ===
The building contains a total of 556 apartments: 408 rental units on the 3rd through 27th floors and 148 condominiums beginning on the 28th floor. Shared building amenities are located on the second floor, which include a fitness center, 70-foot (21 m) lap pool, sauna, steam room, yoga room, lounge, game room, 12-seat screening room, and children's playroom.

While the exterior of the building is black, Meier used white in the design of the interior spaces, such as in the wood flooring and in the kitchen cabinets and counters. The 30-foot-tall (9.1 m) lobby contains white travertine slabs in its floor and walls, which were personally selected by Solow from the same quarry in Tivoli used in his building at 9 West 57th Street. The rear wall of the lobby contains Mural Paintings I-III, a 1962 triptych by Joan Miró from Solow's personal collection. Valued at over $40 million, the three-paneled artwork was relocated from Solow's building at 9 West 57th Street. The paintings consist of 9-by-12-foot (2.7 m × 3.7 m) canvases, each predominately featuring a single color—yellow-orange, green or red—and had been previously exhibited at Tate Modern in London and the National Gallery of Art in Washington, D.C.

685 First Avenue was the first residential tower in New York City to offer a built-in home automation system. A smart home system manufactured by Crestron Electronics was installed in every condominium and enabled control of the temperature, lighting, and motorized window shades through an app or a wall-mounted touch screen.
