= Jay S. Hennick =

Canadian businessman (born 1957)

Jay S. Hennick CM
- Born: Jay Stewart Hennick; January 20, 1957 (age 69); Toronto, Ontario, Canada
- Education: York University (B.A.); University of Ottawa (LL.B.)
- Occupations: Businessman, philanthropist
- Known for: Chairman and CEO, Colliers; Founder and Chairman, FirstService Corporation; Co-Founder, The Jay and Barbara Hennick Family Foundation
- Website: JayHennick.com

Jay Stewart Hennick CM (born January 20, 1957) is a Canadian billionaire businessman and philanthropist. He is the global chairman, CEO and controlling shareholder of Colliers, and the founder, chairman and largest shareholder of FirstService Corporation. Along with his wife, Barbara, he is the co-founder of The Jay and Barbara Hennick Family Foundation. In 2022, Hennick was named to Forbes' annual list of the world's billionaires.

== Biography ==
Hennick was born in 1957 in Toronto, Ontario, Canada. His first job was a summer lifeguard at an apartment complex at age 15; it gave him the idea for his first company. In 1972, at the age of 17 and while still a teenager in high school, Hennick borrowed $1,000 from his father Sam and founded a commercial swimming pool staffing and management business called Superior Pools, which subsequently employed hundreds of students throughout the Greater Toronto Area.

After graduating from high school in 1975, Hennick went on to study economics at York University, earning a Bachelor of Arts degree in 1978. He then received a Bachelor of Laws degree from the University of Ottawa in 1981. Hennick would later be awarded Honorary Doctorates of Laws from both York University and the University of Ottawa.

Hennick has served as a member of the board of directors of Mount Sinai Hospital in Toronto since 1998, Co-Chairman of the Mount Sinai Hospital Foundation from 2011 to 2013, and chairman of the board of directors of Mount Sinai Hospital from 2013 to 2016. He is also a documentary film producer, having co-produced Made You Look: A True Story About Fake Art, a 2021 Netflix documentary on one of the largest art scams in U.S. history. Hennick is the executive producer of the documentary ‘Born Hungry’ which follows the journey of Canadian chef Sash Simpson. It premiered at the Palm Springs International Festival in 2024.

== Career ==
Hennick joined a predecessor to the law firm of Fogler, Rubinoff LLP and worked under the mentorship of Lloyd S.D. Fogler, Q.C. After four years as an associate, Hennick was promoted to the position of partner, the youngest partner to be admitted to the firm. During his years in private practice, Hennick advised and executed a variety of corporate and business law transactions. He specialized in regulated financial institutions such as banks and trust companies.

In 1989, while still working as a corporate lawyer, Hennick acquired the College Pro Painters franchise system and combined it with Superior Pools to form FirstService Corporation. He was introduced to Peter Drucker, a well-known management consultant, educator, author and influential thinker on the subjects of business, management theory and practice in 1990. By 1993, Hennick made the decision to take FirstService public and completed an initial public offering on the Toronto Stock Exchange. In 1995, its shares were listed on NASDAQ. In 1996, Hennick intimately left his private law practice to focus on the expansion of FirstService as the company’s founder and chief executive officer. He was named Canada's Entrepreneur of the Year in 1998 and CEO of the Year from Canadian Business Magazine in 2001.

In June 2015, FirstService completed a plan of arrangement to separate FirstService into two stand-alone publicly traded companies: Colliers International Group Inc. and FirstService Corporation. Hennick became global chairman and chief executive officer of Colliers, and chairman and founder of FirstService. The market capitalization of Colliers is more than US$5 billion and Hennick owns, directly and indirectly, more than 14 percent of the equity and 45 percent of the votes of the company.

Hennick was the 2019 International Horatio Alger Award Recipient and became a member of the Order of Canada that same year. Hennick was inducted into the Canadian Business Hall of Fame in 2024.

== The Hennick Family Foundation ==
Hennick, along with his wife Barbara, co-founded The Jay and Barbara Hennick Family Foundation, which donates to causes focused on education, health care and the arts primarily in Canada. The following are some of the causes the foundation has supported: the Hennick Centre of Business and Law at York University, providing post-graduate studies for students; the Hennick JD/MBA Program at York University, renamed for the Hennick family after a $6 million gift to the program, providing scholarships to students; the Jay S. Hennick Business and Community Leadership Program at the University of Ottawa, which provides financial support to JD law students who have been admitted into the MBA program at the Telfer School of Management as part of the combined JD-MBA program at the University of Ottawa; the Hennick Family Wellness Centre, which opened at Mount Sinai Hospital in 2016 and houses the largest collection of the art works of iconic Canadian artist Sorel Etrog; Yad Vashem in Israel named one of its entrance arches at the Yad Vashem Entrance Plaza after Barbara and Jay Hennick and Family.

Sinai Health announced that the Hennick family donated $36 million in October 2021, the single largest donation in its history and resulting in renaming its facility the Hennick Bridgepoint Hospital. In July 2022, The Jay and Barbara Hennick Family Foundation made a historic donation of $50 million to the Royal Ontario Museum in support of a multi-year revitalization plan. It represented the largest cash gift in the museum’s history.

On April 10, 2026, the Jay and Barbara Hennick Family Foundation made another $50 million donation, this time to Humber River Health, and again, the single largest in the organization's history. In recognition of this generous donation, Humber River Health will rename its main site, the Wilson site, Hennick Humber Hospital.
