= Morningside Gardens =

Housing cooperative in Manhattan

Coordinates: 40°48′44.95″N 73°57′31.33″W

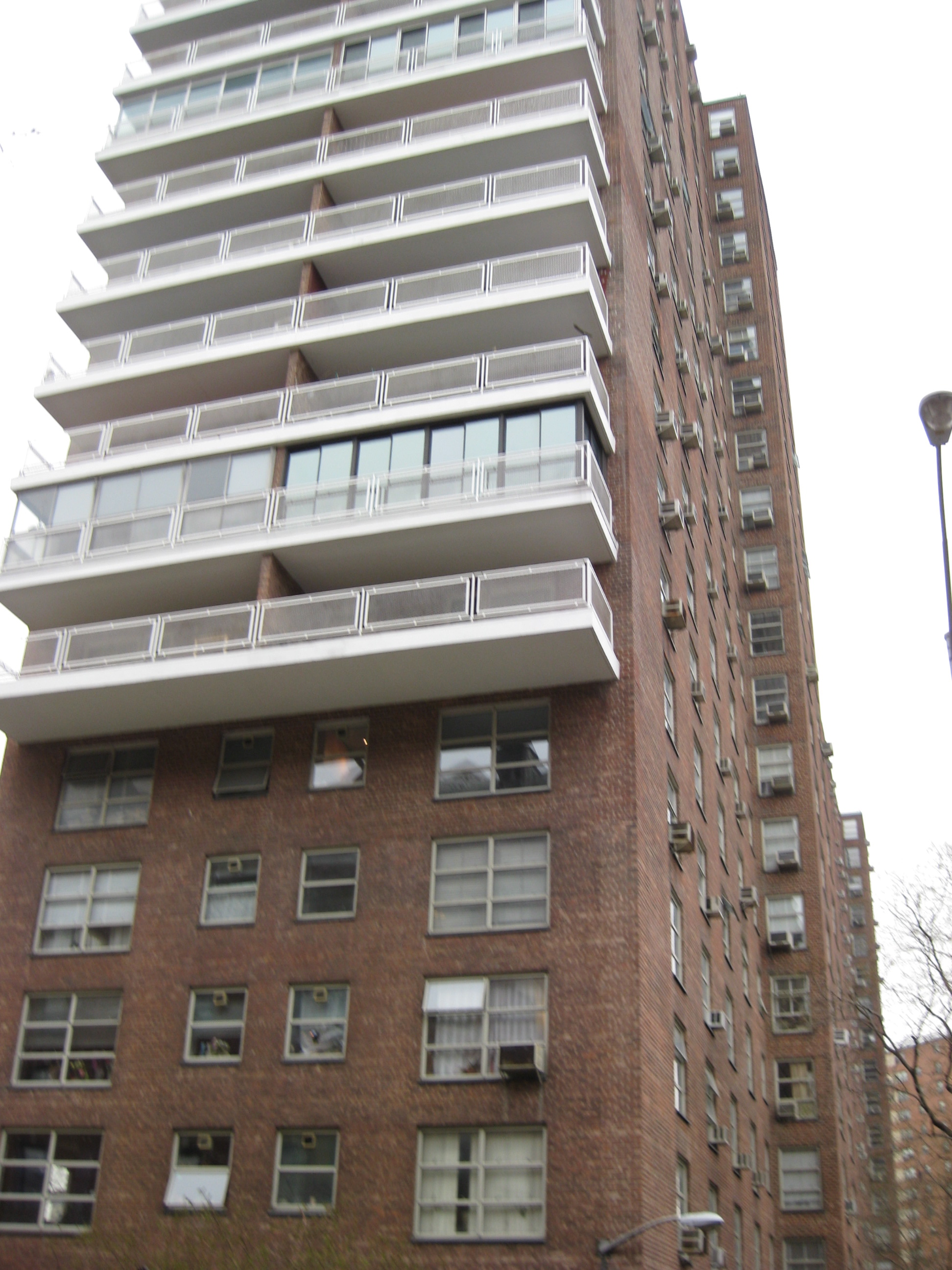
Morningside Gardens

Morningside Gardens is a private housing cooperative operated by Morningside Heights Housing Corporation (MHHC) in Morningside Heights, Manhattan, New York City. The complex was designed by noted architectural firm Harrison & Abramovitz. It is composed of a parking garage and six apartment buildings of 21 stories each, for a total of about 980 apartments. MHHC rents space to the Children's Learning Center preschool and the Morningside Retirement and Health Service. The complex has many amenities for its cooperators including a playground, a fitness center, storage units, indoor play spaces for children and young adults, bike rooms, and a workshop including ceramics and woodworking.

The complex is located just north of the campuses of Columbia University, Barnard College and Jewish Theological Seminary, and just east of the campuses of Manhattan School of Music and Union Theological Seminary in the northern section of Morningside Heights. It is bordered by Broadway on the west, Amsterdam Avenue on the east, 123rd Street on the south, and La Salle Street on the north.

== History ==
The facility was built as an owner-occupied co-op with its initial construction subsidized by New York City. The early development of the project, led by a team of civic leaders headed by banker David Rockefeller and Columbia University president Grayson Kirk, later formed the basis of the Mitchell-Lama law, which led to many similar co-operative housing facilities, most in NYC and a small number in the local suburbs. Morningside Gardens, which replaced a slum area with a population of approximately 6,000 people, was created primarily for 972 middle-income families. Construction started in 1954.

When the complex opened in 1957, one-third of the first residents were employees of the prominent educational institutions in the neighborhood, and of the National Council of Churches and other religious organizations located in the nearby Interchurch Center. One objective of Morningside Gardens was to create a racially integrated community. The population was 75% white, 20% black, 4% Asian, and 1% Puerto Rican.

Today Morningside Gardens is managed by an elected eleven member board of directors. MHHC contracts with FirstService Residential to provide property management services for the complex. There is a small security force that has helped the Gardens to experience a very low crime rate. For most of its existence, the By-Laws set a maximum resale price for those selling their apartments; this changed somewhat in 2006, when the co-op voted to allow residents to sell their units at a progressive yearly increase designed to top out at 80% of market value, or three times the previous maximum sale price per apartment. In 2015 Morningside's bylaws adopted changes which eliminate entirely Maximum Resale Prices and allow sales on the Open Market.

In June 2013, Morningside Gardens partnered with the New York City Department of Sanitation on a pilot project to compost its food waste. This pilot program was highlighted on NPR's The Brian Lehrer Show on March 12, 2014.

== Notable residents ==
- Fiona Apple, singer-songwriter, lived here as a child.
- Robert L. Carter, lawyer and civil rights activist who presented part of the oral arguments in Brown v. Board of Education, was a resident of Morningside Gardens.
- Samuel R. Delany, science fiction author and literary critic, lived in Morningside Gardens as a child.
- Thurgood Marshall, the first African-American Supreme Court justice, lived in Morningside Gardens. The Thurgood Marshall Room in 80 LaSalle Street is named after him.
- Ivy V. Polk, actress, widow of Gone with the Wind actor Oscar Polk, is a resident of Morningside Gardens since the late 1950s.
