= Heitman LLC =

Real estate investment firm based in Chicago

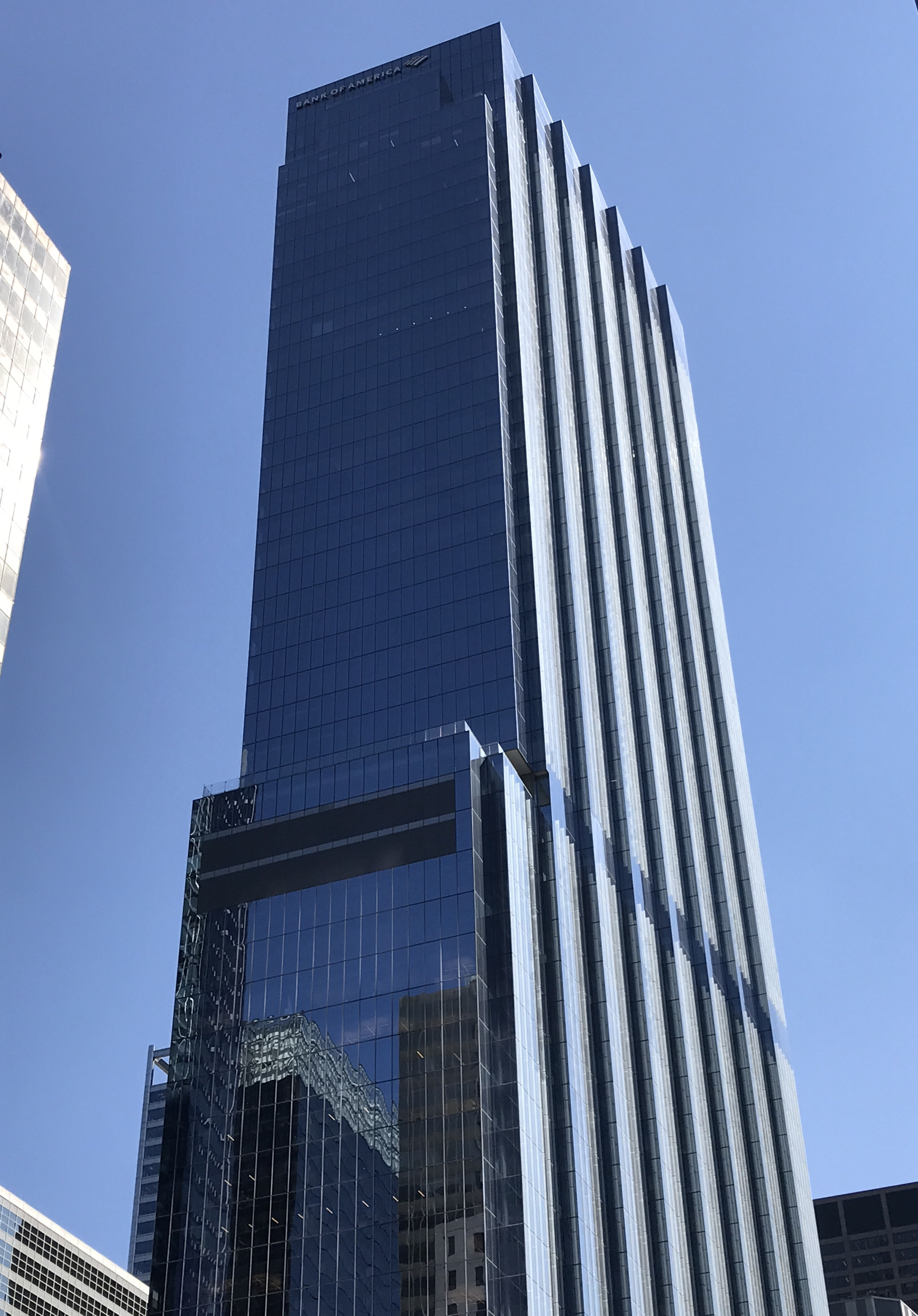
- Headquarters at 110 North Wacker
- Formerly: Heitman Financial
- Type: Private
- Industry: Real estate investment management
- Founded: 1966; 60 years ago
- Headquarters: 110 North Wacker, Chicago, Illinois, U.S.
- Key people: Maury Tognarelli (CEO)
- AUM: US$48 billion (June 2024)
- Number of employees: 350 (2023)
- Website: www.heitman.com

Heitman LLC (Heitman) is an American real estate investment firm headquartered in Chicago. It has three main business areas, private equity real estate, real estate debt and investment in real estate securities such as Real estate investment trusts (REITs).

Outside the United States, the firm has offices in Europe and Asia-Pacific.

== Background ==
Heitman was founded in 1966 in Chicago with an early focus on Mortgage Banking and servicing. At the time it was trying to find a way to capitalize real estate development activity as few institutional investors were making equity investments in real estate.

By the 1970s, Heitman was moving into equity investment management to complement its debt business. Institutional investors such as pension plans and state public retirements systems were beginning to invest in real estate.

By the 1980s, Heitman started forming commingled funds where capital was pooled from institutional investors to purchase real estate properties. In 1989, Heitman established Heitman Real Estate Securities which would invest in public securities related to real estate such as REITs. During the 1980s, Heitman received large fees from buying and managing commercial real estate for pension funds and other institutional investors. However the US Real Estate Crash of the 1980 caused many of the investments to produce losses.

In 1993 Heitman sold itself to United Asset Management (UAM) and became a subsidiary of it.

In 1994, Heitman acquired JMB Realty's institutional asset management and non-retail property management businesses. These businesses were in the same area as Heitman and was believed to complement the firm. After the acquisition Heitman's assets under management doubled in size from $6 billion to 12 billion.

In early 1997, Heitman proposed to its investors that it would perform a conversion that involved a rollup $3 billion of finite-life commingled investment funds it managed into three new REITs that it would continue to manage. At this point, many of Heitman's funds were going mature soon resulting in a loss of management fees. In late April, Heitman invited all investors to Chicago for a presentation on the plan. The Orange County's pension plan who was not an investor in the funds but had co-invested in the properties through Heitman, sent a representative who asked Heitman to conduct a straw poll of investors to gauge support for the plan. Heitman chairman Norman Perlmutter in an emotionally charged manner criticized the request stating Orange County wasn't a fund investor so it had no right to ask. It was stated this was a turning point for many people who were on the fence. Eventually the investors rejected the proposal with reasons including REITs liquidity concerns, cost of conversion being too high, wanting to cash out and not wanting to pay more management fees to Heitman who was seen as wanting to retain control over the assets. In addition it was believed existing public REITs could pay more for properties than Heitman. On May 15, in a letter to investors, Heitman stated it would abandon the conversion attempt resulting in 18 funds being required to be liquidated as originally planned.

In early 1998, Hetiman underwent restructuring in an attempt to get clients who were not satisfied with the firm's performance to reinvest in it. Heitman would move its focus from commingled funds to high-yield real estate, REITs and overseas investing. Multiple senior executives left the firm. In the last two years, the firm had lost several billion in assets under management. In July that year, Kennedy Wilson acquired Beverly Hills-based Heitman Properties, the commercial real estate management and leasing arm of Heitman for around $20 million.

In September 2000, UAM was purchased by Old Mutual. There was a change in ownership where 50% of Heitman would be owned by Old Mutual while the other 50% were held by Heitman's management team.

In the early 2000s, Heitman started expanding its operations into Asia.

In 2018, Heitman acquired Old Mutual's stake of the firm making it entirely owned by its management team.

Most of Heitman's investments are in private equity real estate. Its biggest market is North America followed by Europe and Asia.

== Lawsuits ==
In May 2020, Heitman sued Jenner & Block alleging it failed to pay it more than $3.7 million in rent during the months of April and May 2020. In June 2020, Jenner filed a counterclaim stating Heitman actually owed it $840,000 in credits as it was unable to use its Chicago office at the start of the COVID-19 pandemic. In September 2021, both parties reached a settlement.
