= California Closets =

American organization product retailer

- Type: Subsidiary
- Industry: Retail, Manufacturing
- Founded: Woodland Hills, California (1978)
- Founder: Neil Balter
- Headquarters: Phoenix, Arizona, United States
- Number of locations: 140+ showrooms
- Key people: Charlie Chase (President & CEO)
- Products: Custom closets, custom cabinetry, home organization systems
- Owner: FirstService
- Website: www.californiaclosets.com

California Closets is a North American manufacturer and retailer specializing in custom closets and home storage solutions. The company operates through a network of corporate-owned locations and franchises across the United States, Canada, Mexico, and the Caribbean. Since October 21, 1998, California Closets has operated as a subsidiary of FirstService Brands.

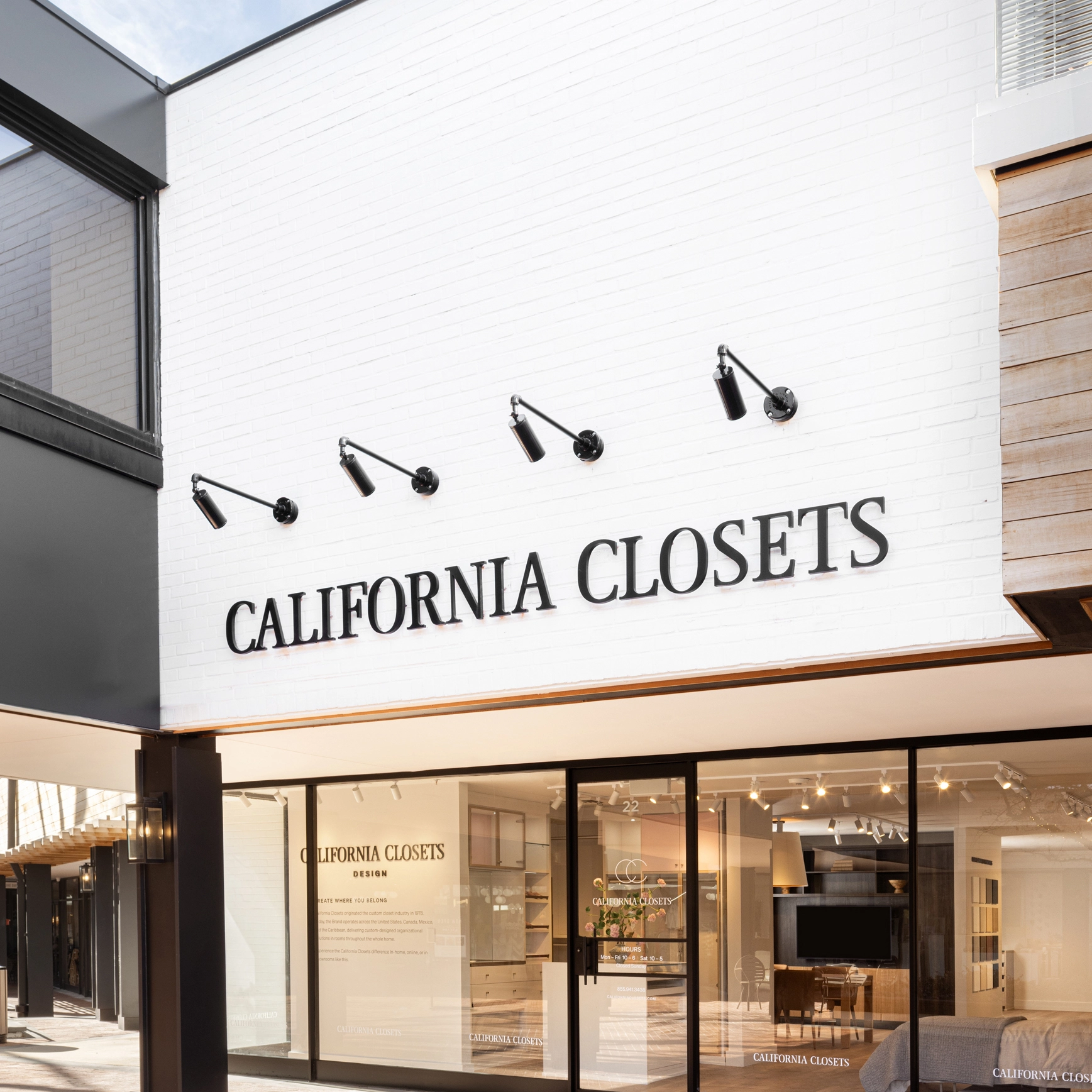
California Closets Showroom

== History ==
=== Early years ===
California Closets was founded in 1978 in Woodland Hills, California, by Neil Balter, an 18-year-old college student who initially built custom storage systems to maximize dorm room closet space. As the business grew, Balter dropped out of community college just shy of an associate degree in advertising. In 1982, California Closets began expanding beyond its origin in the San Fernando Valley by selling its first franchise in Huntington Beach, California. Franchises outside of California were known as Creative Closets. By 1984, the company had outlets in western Canada, including Calgary and Edmonton, with 31 total units. By 1989, the company had 101 franchises in five countries.

The high-end home furnishings retailer Williams-Sonoma acquired California Closets in 1990. The company relocated to San Francisco. Balter received a five-year contract to remain the company's president, but after a stretch of uneven management and slowness attributable to the early 1990s recession, he departed within two years. Williams-Sonoma sold the business in 1994 to investors led by Bill LeVine and Anthony Vidergauz.

=== FirstService ownership ===
In 1998, FirstService Corporation acquired California Closets, joining its stable of other franchises. California Closets moved its headquarters in 2011 from San Rafael to Berkeley, California.
