= Gary L. Tooker =

American businessman

Gary L. Tooker was the CEO of Motorola from 1993 to 1995. He became CEO after George M. C. Fisher left for Eastman Kodak. Prior to becoming CEO, Tooker was president and chief operating officer. After becoming CEO, Christopher Galvin became the chief operating officer in place of Tooker until 1995, when he replaced Tooker as CEO. Since 2000, he has been an independent consultant.

Tooker and his wife Diane, who are both alumni of Arizona State University, "donated $4 million to ASU to endow five faculty positions—one faculty chair and four professorships—in the Ira A. Fulton Schools of Engineering" which includes the Diane and Gary Tooker Chair for Effective Education in Science, Technology, Engineering and Math.

== Education ==
Tooker graduated from Arizona State University in 1961 where earned a bachelor's degree in Electrical Engineering, and did his postgraduate studies in Business Administration.

== Career ==
Tooker began "working for Motorola in 1962 within its Arizona Semiconductor Division. He rose through the company, becoming chief operating officer in 1988, president two years later, and finally vice chairman and CEO in 1993."

== Awards ==
In 2015, Tooker was inducted into Eta Kappa Nu Honor Society's Epsilon Beta Chapter (Arizona State University) as a professional member. In 2012, Tooker was awarded the OneNeck IT Services' Lifetime Achievement Award. He was elected as a member into the National Academy of Engineering in 1996 and received an Engineering Excellence Award, an Alumni Achievement Award for Professional Excellence and an honorary Doctor of Humane Letters from ASU.

Business positions
Preceded by George M. C. Fisher	CEO of Motorola; 1993 - 1995	Succeeded by Christopher Galvin
