= Christopher Galvin =

American businessman (born 1950)

Christopher B. Galvin
- Born: March 21, 1950 (age 76)
- Education: Northwestern University
- Known for: CEO of Motorola, Inc. Co-founding Harrison Street Real Estate Capital
- Spouse: Cindy
- Children: 2

Christopher B. Galvin (born March 21, 1950) is an American businessman. He served as the chairman and chief executive officer of Motorola from 1997 to 2003. In 2005, he co-founded Harrison Street Real Estate Capital.

== Early life ==
Christopher Galvin is the grandson of Paul Galvin, the founder of Motorola, and the son of Robert Galvin, who served as CEO of Motorola from 1959 to 1990. He received his BS in political science from Northwestern University and his M.B.A. from the Kellogg School of Management at Northwestern University.

== Career ==
From 1967 to 1973, during college, Galvin held part-time summer assignments at Motorola. From 1973 to 1983, he served full-time positions in sales, sales management, marketing management and mobile two-way radio product management, taking leave 1975–77 to attend graduate business school full-time. From 1983 to 1985, he became marketing director then general manager of the Tegal semiconductor equipment unit owned by Motorola Inc. In 1985, he became vice-president and director of Motorola's radio paging Division, where he sponsored the team that created one of the first virtually completely automated manufacturing operations in the US, called Project Bandit. Galvin was promoted to corporate vice-president and general manager of paging. In 1988, he was named chief corporate staff officer of the corporation, later senior vice president and appointed to the Policy and Operating Committees of Motorola Inc. In 1990, he was promoted to assistant chief operating officer and joined as the third member of the office of the CEO of Motorola Inc. In 1993, he was elevated to president and chief operating officer. In 1997, he became CEO. In 1999, he added the role of chairman of the board to that of CEO.

Following the dot-com crash in 2000, he led a massive three-year restructuring of Motorola that included large lay-offs, closure of manufacturing facilities and reducing break-even costs. Simultaneously, Galvin led the renewal of Six Sigma Quality through Digital Six Sigma and introduced Motorola's MOTO language advertising campaign in 2002. The RAZR cellular phone was designed by Galvin's innovators in new product development methodologies created during the 2001–2003 timeframe. RAZR was introduced July 27, 2004. The innovations behind the RAZR was so cutting edge that even Galvin's eventual successor, Ed Zander, stated “There was a small team developing the RAZR before I got there. When I saw the technology, it blew me away.”

On September 19, 2003, the board of directors announced publicly it would seek another CEO. Galvin stated his objection to the board's view of Galvin's turnaround efforts, and stated, "The Board and I do not share the same view of the pace, strategy and progress at this stage of the turnaround.” Galvin resigned on January 4, 2004.

After departing Motorola, Galvin served as chairman of the board of Navteq Inc. (2004–2008), and then of Cleversafe Inc.

Business positions
Preceded by Gary L. Tooker	CEO of Motorola; 1997–2003	Succeeded by Edward Zander
