= Edward Zander =

American business executive (born 1947)

Edward J. Zander
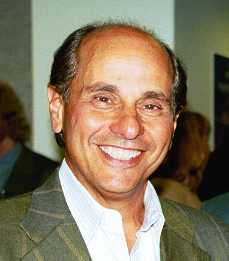
- Born: January 12, 1947 (age 79); Brooklyn, New York
- Education: Rensselaer Polytechnic Institute; Boston University
- Known for: IT executive

Edward J. Zander (born 1947) is an American business executive. He was CEO and Chairman of the Board of Motorola from January 2004 until January 2008, remaining as chairman until May 2008. His work in the technology sector included management positions at Data General and Apollo Computer before joining Sun Microsystems in 1987, where he was later promoted to Chief Operating Officer and President.

After leaving Sun in 2002, he became managing director at Silver Lake Partners, a private-equity firm. He also serves on the board of directors for Jason Foundation for Education, on the science advisory board of Rensselaer Polytechnic Institute (where he received a degree in electrical engineering), the advisory board for IOCOM Communications, and the advisory board of the Boston University School of Management (where he received his Master of Business Administration and later an honorary D.H.L.). He was also a member of the board of directors at Seagate Technologies from 2002 to 2004, and at Time Warner Inc. from January to May 2007. He has been a member of the board of directors at EagleView Technologies Inc. since 2008.

== Personal ==
Zander is the son of Jewish immigrants from Poland (father) and Greece (mother), who couldn't afford college but stressed education to their children. His father reportedly dreamed of being a lawyer but instead settled for a job as a furrier in order to support his ill parents. Growing up, he was given the nickname "Fast Eddie" by his friends because, according to a Boston Globe article, he frequently demonstrated the "hustle of a street kid spoiling for a good fight." Zander himself remarked, "I'm from New York, so I'm New York fast" (June 19, 2000). Zander attended Rensselaer Polytechnic Institute, and graduated in the class of 1968. Zander is married to Mona Zander, and the couple have two sons.

== Career at Sun Microsystems ==
Edward Zander's career at Sun Microsystems began in 1987. Throughout the 1990s, he rose through the ranks, taking the role of vice president of corporate marketing, and then becoming president of Sun's software division in 1991, moving to the same position for Sun's systems division in 1995. In January 1998, he was promoted to COO for the entire company and was given the additional role of President of Sun in April 1999. Zander was responsible for Sun's seven product divisions which included engineering, product development, sales, service, and marketing. The CTO and corporate brand marketing also reported to him.

After Zander left the company in 2002, CEO Scott McNealy reassumed the duties of President and COO until the promotion of Jonathan Schwartz to those roles on April 2, 2004.

== Career at Motorola ==
On January 5, 2004, Zander was selected by the Motorola board of directors to succeed Chris Galvin who retired in September 2003, ending a three generation reign of his family at the head of the electronics giant.

The primary candidates considered to replace him were Zander and Mike Zafirovski, though well-known executives such as AT&T Corporation's President Betsy Bernard, Qwest Communications International's Richard Notebaert, and Verizon Communications's Lawrence Babbio were also considered. Earlier, Zafirovski had proved himself an excellent executive at Motorola. He arrived from General Electric and led the cell phone business to profitability. Unfortunately for him, the board was looking for a more radical change in leadership. Even though Zafirovski was virtually an outsider himself (having served at the corporation for only three years), the board of directors went with someone with more experience in a complex organization like Motorola. Zander’s impressive career at Sun and his radical "mover and shaker" attitude won the board over and he was given the position. Zafirovski was disappointed and was expected to leave the company, especially with his history of reported run-ins with the board of directors but stayed until 31 January 2005, when he resigned.

Zander's first task was to oversee the new spin-off that Motorola had begun just shortly before he joined, Freescale Semiconductor. He announced that he would focus the company on its consumer electronics business and start taking better care of its customers (he even assigned the Chief Information Officer, Samir Desai, to one of their largest and angriest customers, Nextel). During his time, he acquired 12 companies and wound down poor-performing businesses. He also ramped up the business units that sell radio equipment to the government, cable set-top box components, and wireless communications products.

Zander came into a tough corporate culture - Motorola's departments have been referred to as "warring tribes". He created a bonus structure that based 25% of all bonuses on customer satisfaction, meeting product deadlines, cooperation between departments, etc. He started looking to target major corporations for communications gear and services, instead of just aiming at customers of the phones and telecom companies with wireless gear. A reorganization of Motorola's business divisions became likely. Zander wanted to see new types of products that focused on melding Internet technologies with wireless phone technologies. He established the philosophy of "seamless mobility" to integrate Motorola's products and create a sense of unity within the company.

After Motorola posted a $181 million loss for the first quarter of 2007, Zander came under increased pressure, with Carl Icahn first demanding a share buyback, then a seat on the board of directors.

Zander has since been named a defendant in a securities fraud class action, on behalf of investors who purchased Motorola stock between July 19, 2006 and January 4, 2007, as a result of allegedly false and misleading public statements issued by Motorola during that time. Zander received $12.5 million in incentive-based pay, much of it dependent on Motorola's financial results, as well as $1.5 million in salary during 2006.

Zander capitalized on the success of the Motorola RAZR too long and was slow adopting 3G. The company lost market share to Samsung and LG Electronics. By 2007, without new cellphones that carriers wanted to offer, Motorola sold tens of millions of Razrs and their offshoots by slashing prices, causing margins to collapse in the process. Under Zander, Ron Garriques (who was responsible for the successful RAZR) departed for Dell Inc., while Stu Reed failed to turn around the struggling mobile handset division. Only after Sanjay Jha took the reins of Motorola's Mobile Devices Unit did it finally managed to right itself.

In January 2007, he rode a yellow bike onto the stage in Las Vegas for his keynote speech at the Consumer Electronics Show. Instead of developing new and exciting products, Motorola placed Razrs into colored lingerie (red in February for Valentine's Day) while Apple Inc. unveiled the revolutionary new iPhone.

Zander stepped down as CEO on 1 January 2008, succeeded by Greg Brown, who was prior to then President and Chief Operating Officer. He was succeeded as chairman by former AT&T CEO David Dorman in May 2008.

Business positions
| Preceded by Scott McNealy | COO of Sun Microsystems; 1998 - 2002 | Succeeded by Scott McNealy |
| Preceded by Scott McNealy | President of Sun Microsystems; 1999 - 2002 | Succeeded by Scott McNealy |
| Preceded by Christopher Galvin | CEO of Motorola; 2004 - 2008 | Succeeded by Greg Brown |
