= Joseph Bachelder III =

American executive compensation lawyer (1932–2020)

- Born: Joseph Elmer Bachelder III; November 13, 1932; Fulton, Missouri, U.S.
- Died: December 13, 2020 (aged 88); Princeton, New Jersey, U.S.
- Education: Yale University (1955); Harvard Law School (1958)
- Known for: Engineering the golden parachute executive compensation structure
- Spouse: Louise Mason
- Children: 3

Joseph Elmer Bachelder III (November 13, 1932 – December 13, 2020) was an American lawyer noted for designing executive compensation packages including the golden parachute. Through his career he represented executives including John Sculley at Apple Inc., Jamie Dimon at Citigroup, George M. C. Fisher at Eastman Kodak, and Louis Gerstner, first at RJR Nabisco and later at IBM.

== Early life ==
Joseph Elmer Bachelder III was born in Fulton, Missouri, to Frances Gray and Joseph Bachelder Jr. His father was a sociology professor and a political analyst, while his mother was a painter and homemaker. Bachelder's interest in statistics was attributed to his father's influence. His father was famously one of the few pollsters who had predicted Harry S. Truman's victory in the 1948 United States presidential election. His father also had Richard Nixon as his client.

Bachelder graduated from Phillips Exeter Academy, an independent school in Exeter, New Hampshire, and went on to graduate from Yale University with a degree in political science in 1955. He graduated from Harvard Law School in 1958.

== Career ==
Bachelder started his career in the 1960s practicing tax law after graduating from Harvard Law School, working with many New York-based tax law firms before setting up his own company in 1980 and moving over to working on executive compensation.

He had a statistical approach to structuring executive compensation packages, employing quantitative analysts and finance experts with PhDs in mathematics instead of legal degrees. He used computer-led quantitative analyses of industries to prove that his clients, the executives, were worth much more to the company, and matched his arguments with data that the executives were accepting much higher risks by accepting the positions. He had the companies against whom he would be negotiating pay for his services, and often got this done because the companies would be assured that the negotiations would not drag on. While he was not the first to have used the golden parachute clause for executive compensation structures, he was responsible for its widespread adoption due to his approach to contract negotiations. The contract structure would emerge highly popular with most of the Fortune 500 companies adopting the structure by the early 1990s, and would later attract much criticism for their excessiveness, particularly in controversial executive exits.

Some of the corporate executives represented by him included John Sculley at Apple Inc., Jamie Dimon first at Citigroup and later at Bank One Corporation, George M. C. Fisher at Eastman Kodak, and Louis Gerstner, first at RJR Nabisco and later at International Business Machines.

He shut down his firm in 2012 and went on to join McCarter and English as a special counsel. He was a contributor to the New York Law Journal and a visiting lecturer at Harvard University.

=== Views on executive compensation ===
Bachelder maintained that the market for the best executives was a highly competitive one and the best executives were like professional athletes in that they were in short supply, and their job security was limited, hence they had to maximize their compensations in the period of time that they were at the top. He appeared before the United States congressional hearing in 2003 on executive pay packages and argued that CEOs were not overpaid. To a statement from then-US senator John McCain about CEO pay packages, Bachelder argued that the single most important factor in a company's success was the CEO's leadership and on the aggregate he "[did] not believe CEO pay has grown outrageously".

In one of his last articles before his death, on the impact of COVID-19 on executive pay, he argued that companies should consider the effects of any compensation reductions on executive morale and through that on company performance, and should adopt plans to restore the same when companies emerge from the financial setbacks caused by the pandemic.

== Personal life ==
Bachelder met his future wife, Louise Mason, when he was studying at Yale University. She was the daughter of a law professor. The couple were married in 1955. They went on to have three daughters. He was a hobby tennis player and in his youth, gave tennis lessons at Yale University and Princeton University including to his future wife. Bachelder died from cancer on December 13, 2020, at his home in Princeton, New Jersey. He was aged 88.
