= Colliers International =

Canadian real estate investment firm

Colliers International Group Inc.
- Trade name: Colliers
- Type: Public
- Traded as: Nasdaq: CIGI; TSX: CIGI
- Industry: Real estate
- Founded: 1976; 50 years ago
- Headquarters: Toronto, Ontario, Canada
- Area served: Worldwide
- Key people: Jay S. Hennick (chairman, CEO); Christian Mayer (CFO)
- Products: Real estate investment, brokerage and management
- Revenue: ▲US$4.82 billion (2024)
- Operating income: ▲US$389 million (2024)
- Net income: ▲US$162 million (2024)
- AUM: ▲US$99.0 billion (2024)
- Total assets: ▲US$6.10 billion (2024)
- Total equity: ▲US$1.32 billion (2024)
- Number of employees: 22,940 (2024)
- Subsidiaries: Harrison Street Asset Management
- Website: colliers.com

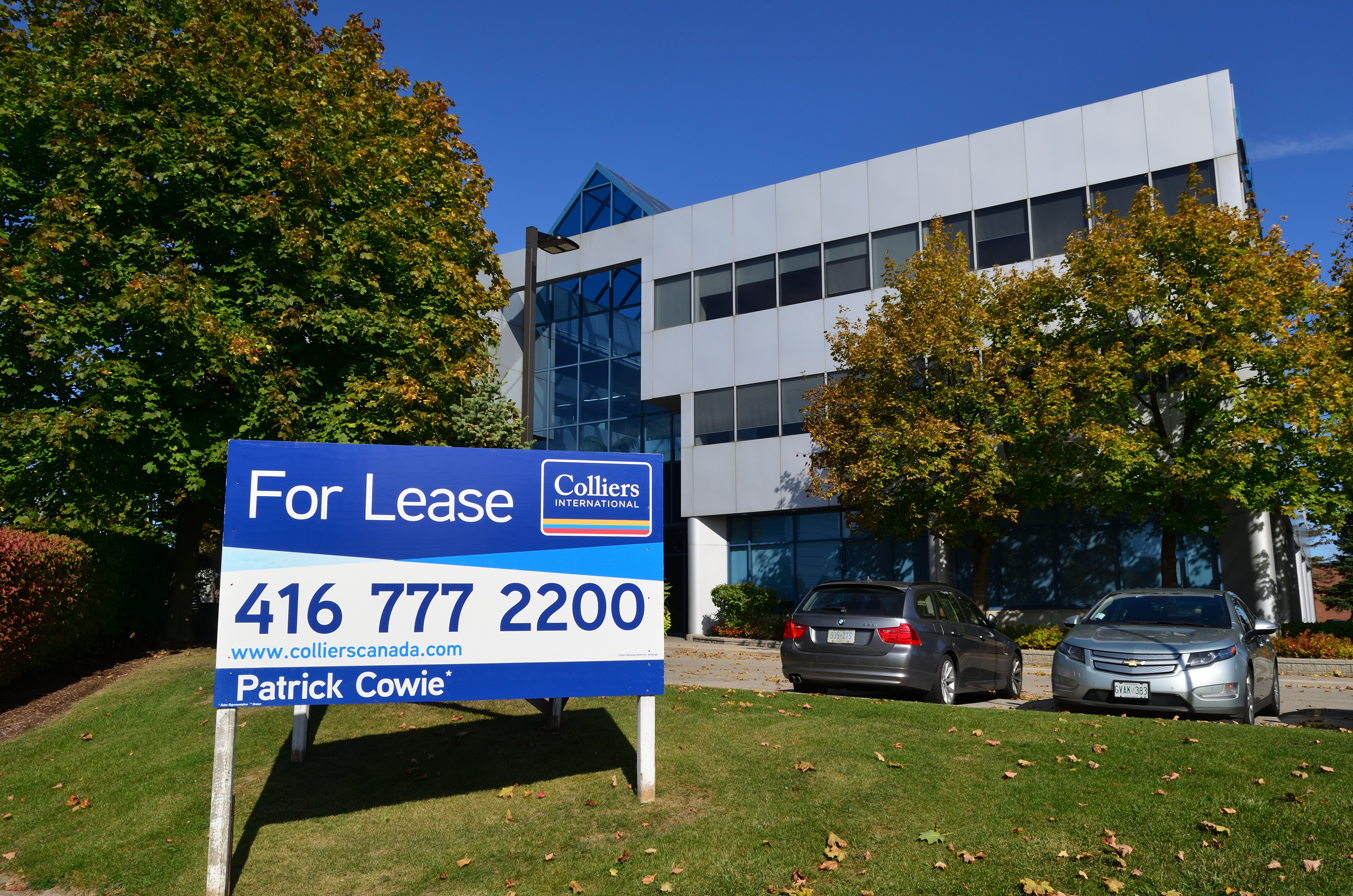
Colliers for lease sign in North America

Colliers International Group Inc. is a Canadian diversified professional services and investment management company with approximately 29,000 employees in more than 400 offices in 65 countries.

The firm provides services to commercial real estate users, owners, investors and developers; they include consulting, corporate facilities, investment services, landlord and tenant representation, project management, urban planning, property and asset management, and valuation and advisory services. The organization serves the hotel, industrial, mixed-use, office, retail and residential property sectors.

The firm has headquarters in Toronto, Ontario. Annual revenues were $4.09 billion in 2021. In June 2015, it was announced that Jay S. Hennick was appointed chairman and chief executive officer.

== History ==
Colliers began in Australia in 1976 after Glynn Lynch & McHarg and Jones Lang Wootten & Sons merged under the Colliers name. In 1978, Colliers merged with Hong Kong–based Tony Petty & Associates.

In 1984, Colliers merged with Macaulay Nicolls. The following year, the company merged with American Realty Services Group. In 1992, the company merged with Jardines, a British firm.

In 2004, FirstService Corporation bought a controlling interest in Colliers Macaulay Nicolls, Colliers' largest member. After gaining controlling interest, Macaulay Nicolls became First Service REA.

In 2006, FirstService purchased a majority stake in PGP Valuation and merged with the appraisal arm of Colliers Macaulay Nicolls. In 2007, FirstService acquired an 80 percent stake in PKF Hotel and Hospitality Consulting and a 60 percent stake in MHPM Project Managers.

In September 2008, FirstService purchased a 65 percent stake in GVA Williams. In 2009, FirstService gained control of Colliers after acquiring large shareholders. In October, Colliers invested in Colliers CRE, a London-based real estate services company.

In January 2010, the merger of Colliers and FirstService was announced. Following the merger in April 2010, Dylan Taylor became president and CEO of Colliers International's US operations. Also in April, Colliers invested in Colliers Bennett & Kahnweiler and West Shell Commercial in Cincinnati, Ohio. The following month, Adena Commercial, a real estate firm in Columbus, Ohio, and Grubb & Ellis Paramount Commerce in Grand Rapids, Michigan, began working with Colliers International. In June 2010, Colliers partnered with Sutton & Edwards, a real estate firm in Long Island, New York.

In July 2014, PKF Consulting was sold to CBRE Group. In June 2015, Colliers International and FirstService Corporation separated into two independent, publicly traded companies – Colliers International Group Inc. and FirstService Corporation.

In September 2016, Stephen Harper, Canada's former Conservative Prime Minister, was appointed to the company's board.

In October 2017, Colliers acquired Serten Advisors, LLC; a tenant representation firm headquartered in the Washington, D.C., area.

In May 2018, Colliers acquired a majority 75% stake in Harrison Street for $550 million.

In September 2019, Colliers acquired Synergy Property Development Services, an Indian real estate company.

In December 2019, Colliers acquired certain divisions of Doughtery Financial based in Minneapolis.

In July 2020, Colliers acquired Maser Consulting P.A., a multi-discipline engineering design services firm based in New Jersey.

In July 2025, Colliers restructured its entire investment management business to be under the Harrison Street brand. These would include its companies: Basalt Infrastructure Partners, Versus Capital, Rockwood Capital, and Colliers Global Investor. The new unit would be named Harrison Street Asset Management.

== Business model ==
In 2010, Colliers consolidated its franchises under a single name, hoping to increase their market share, according to The New York Times. On 1 June 2015 First Services and Colliers split into two independent publicly traded entities. Colliers is a full service real estate brokerage firm that operates in 67 countries and is traded on the Toronto Stock Exchange (TSX) and the NASDAQ stock market exchange under the symbol CIGI. In July 2024, Colliers completed its US$475 million acquisition of a controlling interest in Englobe Corporation.

== Financial results ==
In 2009, Colliers ranked second out of the top twenty-five brokerages in the global real estate industry, based on its combined dollar value of leasing transactions and investment sales globally. The survey also found that Colliers International had posted an increase of more than 28 percent over its 2008 ranking when it was fifth.

In March 2010, the annual Lipsey Survey of the top 25 brands in the commercial real estate industry worldwide ranked Colliers in second. The firm had held the third-place position in that survey since 2004.

In 2018 and 2019, Colliers was ranked third on the annual Lipsey Survey of the Top 25 Commercial Real Estate Brands.

== See also ==
- CBRE Group
- Cushman & Wakefield
- JLL (company)
- Newmark Group
