= Bill Smith (Motorola engineer) =

American engineer

William B. Smith, Jr. (1929 – 1993) was the "father of Six Sigma". Born in Brooklyn, New York, he graduated from the U.S. Naval Academy in 1952 and studied at the University of Minnesota School of Management (now known as the Carlson School of Management) but did not graduate. In 1987, after working for nearly 35 years in engineering and quality assurance, he joined Motorola, serving as vice president and senior quality assurance manager for the Land Mobile.

== Biography ==
In the late 1970s, as John F. Mitchell was on the ascendancy to being named President and COO in 1980, he was joined by other senior managers, notably, CEO Bob Galvin, Jack Germain, and Art Sundry who worked in John F. Mitchell's pager organization to set the quality bar 10 times higher. Sundry was reputed to have shouted "Our quality stinks" at an organizational meeting attended by Galvin, John F. Mitchell and other senior executives; and Sundry got to keep his job. But most importantly, the breakthroughs occurred when it was recognized that intensified focus and improved measurements, data collection, and more disciplined statistical approaches. John F. Mitchell's untiring efforts, and support from Motorola engineers and senior management, prevailed and brought Japanese quality control methods back to the USA, and resulted in a significant and permanent change in culture at Motorola. "We ought to be better than we are," said Germain, director of Quality Improvement. The culmination of Motorola quality engineering efforts occurred in 1986, with the help of an outside quality control consultant who joined Motorola, Bill Smith when the Motorola University and Six-Sigma Institute was founded. Two years later, in 1988, Motorola received the coveted Malcolm Baldrige National Quality Award, which is given by the president of the United States. Smith died of a heart attack in the Motorola cafeteria in 1993.

== Publications ==
- "Six Sigma Design", IEEE Spectrum, 30 (9): 43–47, 1993, doi:10.1109/6.275174, S2CID 10149237
- Smith, William B. (1993), "Total Customer Satisfaction as a Business Strategy", Quality and Reliability Engineering International, 9: 49–53, doi:10.1002/qre.4680090109

== Awards ==
- Motorola CEO Quality Award, 1986 — for his work in correlating early life field reliability to total defects found in the manufacturing process.

== See also ==
- Six Sigma
