= Esther Batchelder =

American chemist

- Born: 19 May 1897
- Died: 13 June 1987 (aged 90)
- Education: Connecticut College (BA); Columbia University (PhD)

Esther Lord Batchelder (19 May 1897 – 13 June 1987) was an American chemist, educator, and expert in the field of nutrition.

== Biography ==
After graduating from Connecticut College in 1919, with a double major in chemistry and home economics, Batchelder went on to complete a Ph.D. in chemistry at Columbia University, in 1929, writing on a topic in food chemistry, under the direction of Henry C. Sherman.

From 1929 to 1932 she was a nutrition specialist for the women's magazine Delineator. She then held posts as assistant professor of nutrition at State College of Washington (1932–1934) and the University of Arizona (1934–1936). In 1936 she became the chairperson of the department of home economics at Rhode Island State College.

Over the course of more than two decades, beginning in 1942, she worked for the United States Department of Agriculture, initially in the human nutrition branch (as of 1943, the Bureau of Human Nutrition and Home Economics), where she rose to become head of the Food and Nutrition division; from 1956 until her retirement in 1965 she served as director of the division of Clothing and Housing Research.

In 1947 Batchelder served as a member of the War Department's food mission to Germany. In the face of the postwar food shortages in Germany that winter season, she helped to accomplish the dehydration of 120,000 tons of vegetables.

Batchelder was a longtime member of the board of trustees at her alma mater, Connecticut College; first elected to a three-year term in 1929, she served on the board continuously from 1937 to 1973.

== Selected publications ==
- Sherman, H. C.; Batchelder, E. L. (1931). "Further investigation of quantitative measurement of vitamin A values". Journal of Biological Chemistry. 91 (2): 505–511. doi:10.1016/S0021-9258(18)76562-9. ISSN 0021-9258.
- Batchelder, E. L. (1934). "Vitamin C delicious apples before and after storage". Journal of Nutrition. 7 (6): 647–655. doi:10.1093/jn/7.6.647. ISSN 0022-3166.
- Batchelder, E. L. (1934). "Nutritional significance of vitamin A throughout the life cycle". American Journal of Physiology. 109 (3): 430–435. doi:10.1152/ajplegacy.1934.109.3.430. ISSN 0002-9513.
- Batchelder, E. L.; Overholser, E. L. (1936). "Factors affecting the vitamin C content of apples". Journal of Agricultural Research. 53: 0547–0551. ISSN 0095-9758.
- Levcowich, T.; Batchelder, E. L. (1942). "Ascorbic acid excretion at known levels of intake as related to capillary resistance, dietary estitmates, and human requirements". Journal of Nutrition. 23 (4): 399–408. doi:10.1093/jn/23.4.399. ISSN 0022-3166.
- Batchelder, Esther L. (1943). "Home Drying Methods and Their Effect on the Palatability, Cooking Quality, and Nutritive Value of Foods". American Journal of Public Health and the Nation's Health. 33 (8): 941–947. doi:10.2105/AJPH.33.8.941. PMC 1527520. PMID 18015862.
- Batchelder, E. L.; Ebbs, J. C. (1944). "Some observations of dark adaptation in man and their bearing on the problem of human requirement for vitamin A". Journal of Nutrition. 27 (4): 295–302. doi:10.1093/jn/27.4.295. ISSN 0022-3166.
- Batchelder, El (1956). "Foods for the Upper Age Group and Nutritional Implications". American Journal of Public Health and the Nation's Health. 46 (10): 1329–1335. doi:10.2105/AJPH.46.10.1329. PMC 1624083. PMID 13362667.

== Honors and awards ==
- 1954: Distinguished Service Award, U.S. Department of Agriculture
- 1969: Connecticut College Medal
