= FirstService =

Canadian corporation

FirstService Corporation
- Company type: Public
- Traded as: Nasdaq: FSV; TSX: FSV; S&P/TSX 60 component
- Industry: Real estate services
- Founded: 1989; 37 years ago
- Founder: Jay S. Hennick
- Headquarters: Toronto, Ontario, Canada
- Key people: D. Scott Patterson (president and CEO); Jay S. Hennick (chairman)
- Number of employees: 24,000
- Website: firstservice.com

FirstService Corporation is a Canadian publicly traded real estate services company, specializing in residential property services, and based in Toronto, Ontario. It is listed on NASDAQ and the Toronto Stock Exchange.

== History ==
FirstService was founded in 1989 by Jay S. Hennick. Its initial assets were a swimming pool management company formerly owned by Hennick, and the College Pro Franchise system acquired by Hennick in 1989. It held an IPO on the Toronto Stock Exchange in 1993. In the 1990s, it expanded into various other residential service franchises, in part through its subsidiary The Franchise Company (later renamed FirstService Brands).

In 1996, it expanded into the residential property management business with the acquisition of two Florida property-management firms. Further acquisitions in the residential property management business followed, including the acquisition of the Merit Companies in 2007, and Planned Communities in 2008. In 2003, Hennick's father left the board of directors, as part of a general corporate governance shake-up.

== Acquisition ==
In 2004, FirstService acquired CMN international, the largest member of Colliers International, an international real estate services group. The cost of the acquisition was $88 million. In 2010, FirstService merged the entire Colliers International platform into itself, creating the third largest real estate services firm in the world.

In 2015, FirstService spun off its Colliers International subsidiary as a commercial property as a new public company, called Colliers International. The remaining company was focused on residential property services, and was led by D. Scott Patterson instead of Hennick.

== Segments ==
FirstService is divided into two segments: FirstService Residential and FirstService Brands. FirstService Residential was responsible for 69% of 2017 revenue, while FirstService Brands was responsible for the other 31%.

FirstService Residential provides property management services to private residential communities, such as condominiums and homeowner associations. It manages approximately 8,000 communities in Canada and the United States. The company manages many Toronto high-rise condominiums, and has been involved in lawsuits with condominium boards over changes in management. Buildings managed by FirstService include The Union in New Haven, Connecticut, ViewPoint in Atlanta, Georgia, Morningside Gardens in New York City, and Ideal Lofts in Toronto, Ontario.

The contracts between FirstService and its subsidiaries on one side and the home-owners associations they serve include "no hire" clauses whereby the latter are forbidden from hiring the current or former employees of FirstService for several months after the end of their employment at FirstService. The union which organizes FirstService workers filed a complained against the practice which it refers to as "bondage fee."

== Franchises ==
FirstService Brands operates six franchise networks which provide services to primarily residential customers, with a total of 1935 franchises . The six networks are Paul Davis Restoration, CertaPro Painters, California Closets, Pillar to Post Home Inspectors, Floor Coverings International, First Onsite and College Pro Painters.

== See also ==
- Choice Properties REIT
