= George M. C. Fisher =

American business executive

George Fisher
- Born: George Myles Cordell Fisher; November 30, 1940 (age 85); Anna, Illinois, U.S
- Education: Brown University; University of Illinois
- Occupation: Business executive
- Years active: Senior advisor of KKR 2003-2014 CEO of Eastman Kodak 1993 - 2000; Motorola 1976-1993

George Myles Cordell Fisher (born 1940 in Anna, Illinois) is an American business executive. He served as the chief executive officer and chairman of Eastman Kodak Company from 1993 to 2000. Prior to joining Kodak, Fisher worked at Motorola, Inc. from 1976 to 1993 and was named president and chief executive officer in 1988 and chairman and CEO in 1990. Prior to joining Motorola, George was involved in research and development at Bell Laboratories for ten years. Fisher retired as a senior advisor at Kohlberg Kravis Roberts after serving from 2003 to 2014.

== Early life and education ==
Fisher was born on November 30, 1940, in Anna, Illinois. He graduated with a B.S. in engineering from the University of Illinois in 1962 where he was a member of Phi Delta Theta fraternity. He received his M.S. in engineering in 1964 and a PhD in applied mathematics in 1966, both from Brown University.

== Career ==
At the Eastman Kodak Company, Fisher was recognized for leadership in electronic communications and corporate management. Fisher is a member of the National Academy of Engineering, having served two terms as chairman from 2000 to 2004, and is a fellow of the American Academy of Arts and Sciences.

During Fisher’s tenure at Kodak, the company competed against Japanese markets and the rise of digital cameras. While director, Fisher claimed that Fujifilm had “rigged” Japanese markets and urged the US government to restrict trade with Japan to help Kodak in the US. Fisher also oversaw the development of APS film which proved to be a failure with consumers.

He is a past member of the boards of AT&T, American Express Company, Comcast Corporation, Delta Air Lines, Inc., Eastman Kodak Company, Eli Lilly and Company, General Motors Corporation, Hughes Electronics Corporation, Motorola, Inc., Minnesota Mining & Manufacturing, and Brown University. He was also chairman of PanAmSat Corporation from 2004 to 2006.

Fisher is a past member of the United States-China Business Council, serving as chairman from 1997 to 1999; and a member of the U.S. Council on Competitiveness, serving as chairman from 1990 to 1993. Fisher was chairman of the Industry Policy Advisory Committee (IPAC) for the U.S. Trade Representative and the U.S. Secretary of Commerce. He was an appointed member of the President’s Advisory Council for Trade Policy and Negotiations from 1993 to 2002 serving under both Presidents Clinton and George W. Bush. He is a former member of the Advisory Board of Allianz International in Germany, an emeritus member of the Singapore Economic Development Board’s International Advisory Council, and a former member of the Tsinghua University Executive Education Advisory Board in China. He was a member of the Board of The National Urban League, Inc. and the University of Illinois Foundation, where he served as chairman from 1997 to 1999.

Business positions
Preceded by Robert W. Galvin	CEO of Motorola; 1988 – October 27, 1993	Succeeded by Gary L. Tooker (acting)
Preceded by Kay R. Whitmore	CEO of Eastman Kodak; October 28, 1993 – December 31, 1999	Succeeded by Daniel A. Carp
