= 110 North Wacker =

Office skyscraper in Chicago, Illinois

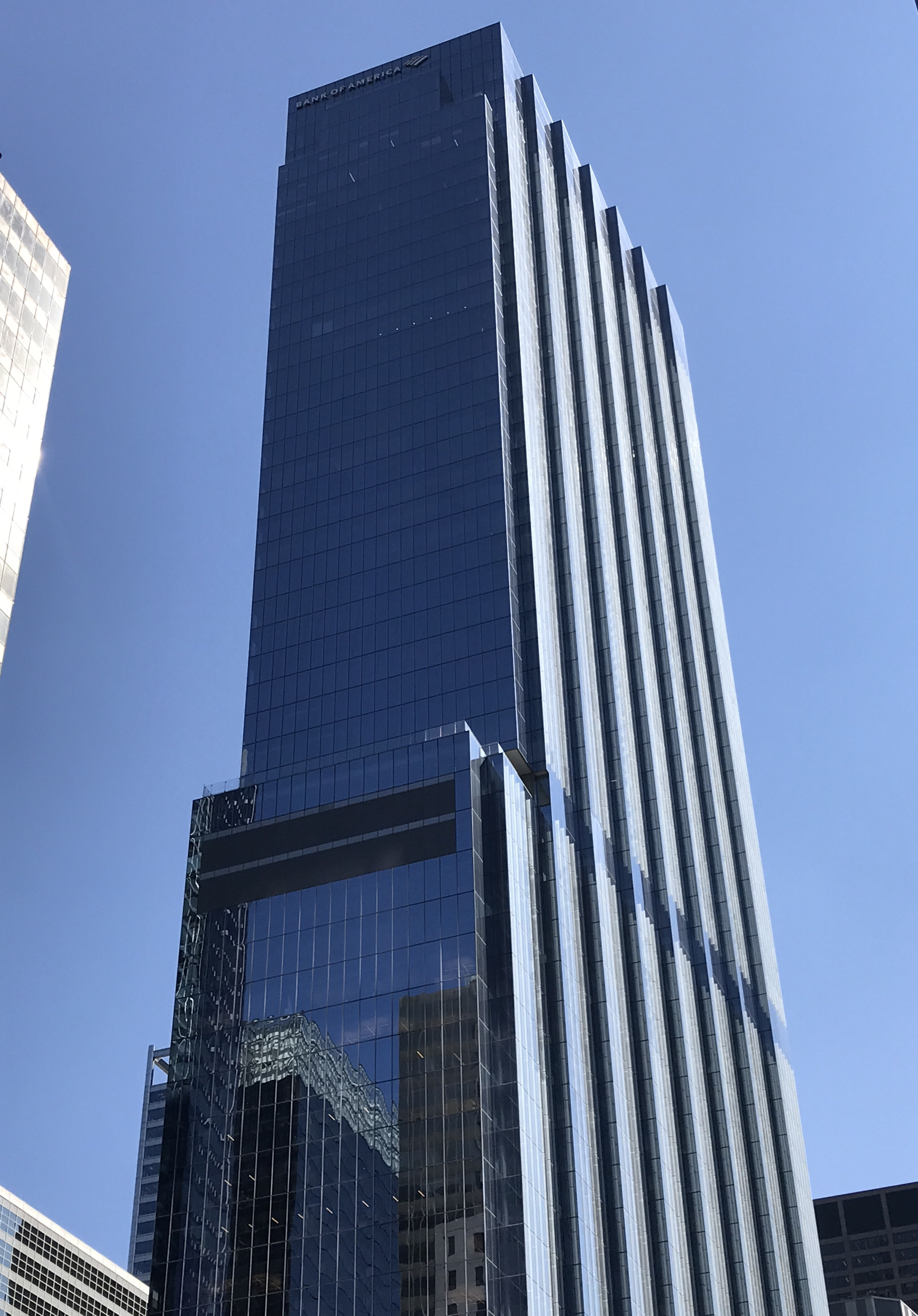
- Alternative names: Bank of America Tower

General information
- Status: Completed
- Type: Office building
- Location: 110 North Wacker Drive; Chicago, Illinois, U.S.
- Coordinates: 41°53′01.4″N 87°38′14.7″W
- Construction started: 2018
- Topped-out: September 2019
- Completed: 2020

Height
- Roof: 817 feet (249 m)

Technical details
- Floor count: 57

Design and construction
- Architect: Goettsch Partners
- Developer: Howard Hughes Corporation
- Main contractor: Clark Construction

110 North Wacker, also known as the Bank of America Tower, is a 57-floor skyscraper in Chicago located at 110 North Wacker Drive. It was developed by the Howard Hughes Corporation and Riverside Investment & Development. It was designed by Goettsch Partners with construction by Clark Construction. Structural engineering was by Thornton Tomasetti. A topping-out ceremony was held in September 2019 and the building officially opened in on October 14, 2020.

With a height of 816.83 feet (248.97 m) and containing 57 stories, it is the tallest all-commercial building in Chicago since Two Prudential Plaza in 1990. Bank of America has committed to leasing 500,000 square feet (46,000 m^{2}) of office space in the building. Perkins Coie has also signed a lease to the building.

== Construction ==
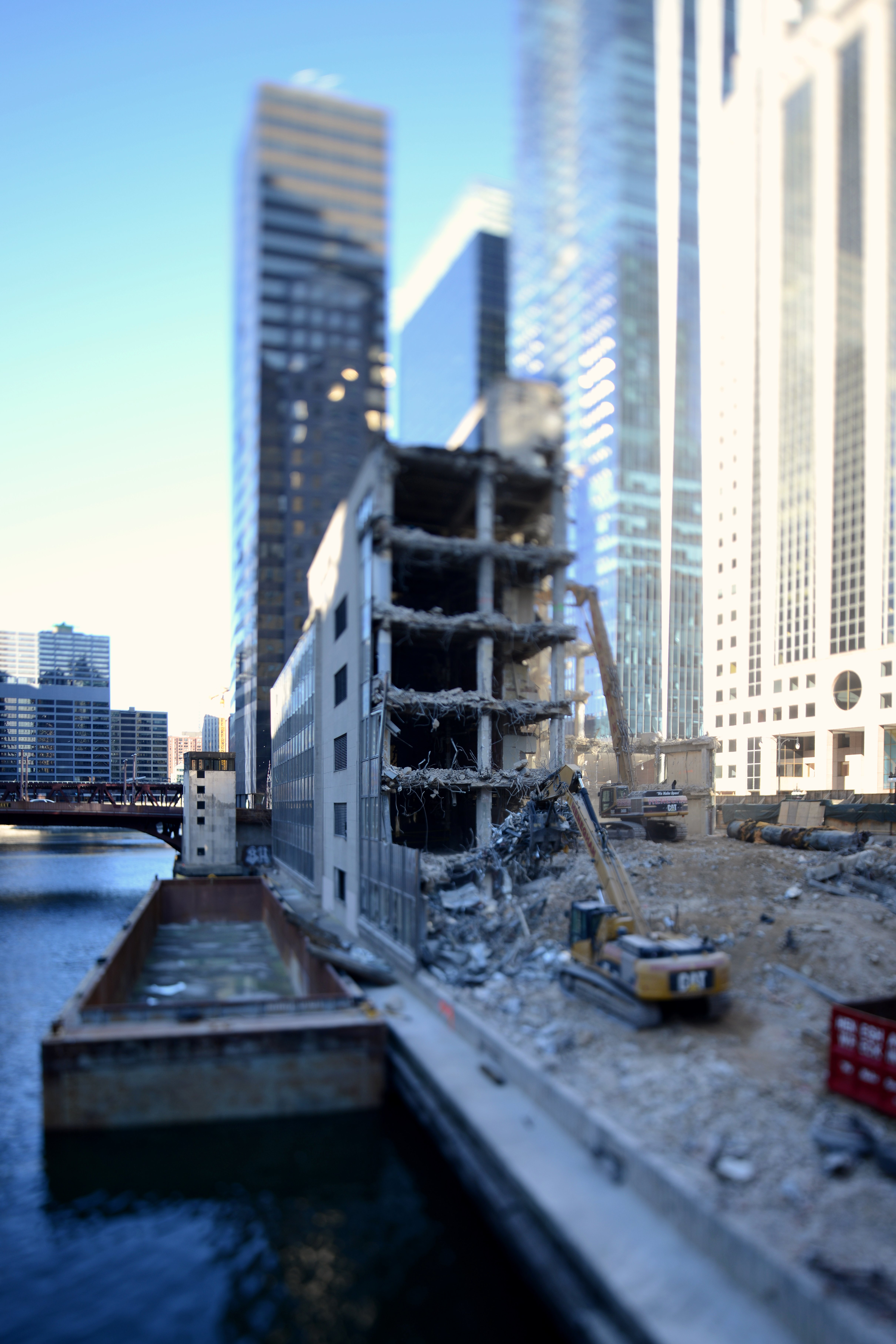
Demolition of the GGP building

The address was previously the site of the GGP building, which was constructed in 1958 and served as the headquarters of Morton Salt until 1990, after which it was the headquarters of General Growth Properties (GGP) starting in 1997. The Howard Hughes Corporation and Riverside Investment & Development purchased the site in 2014, and plans for a new building were announced in early 2017, being approved by the Chicago Plan Commission in March and again in revised form in December.

In 2017 GGP agreed to leave the premises starting in early 2018. In August 2017 the Illinois Historic Preservation Agency found that the GGP building was eligible for the National Register of Historic Places, which resulted in the United States Army Corps of Engineers giving public notice that demolition of the building would constitute an "adverse effect" on the surroundings. This required a period for public comments and could have jeopardized the future of the development. It was ultimately decided that some of the facade of the GGP building would be incorporated into the base of the new building, and the GGP building was demolished beginning in January 2018.

Barges were used extensively in the construction of the new building, much of which also took place on the lower levels of the multi-level Wacker Drive. An ordinance requiring open air for a riverwalk would have rendered the project uneconomical if interpreted literally, so the building was allowed to overhang the riverwalk by 55 feet (17 m).

== Sale ==
On December 28, 2021, it was announced that Callahan Capital Partners and Oak Hill Advisors had purchased 110 N. Wacker from Howard Hughes Corp. for more than $1B.
