= Myrtle Bachelder =

American chemist and officer (1908–1997)

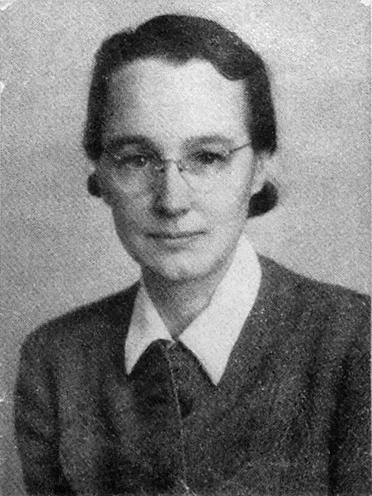
- Bachelder in 1942
- Born: Myrtle Claire Bachelder; March 13, 1908; Worcester, Massachusetts, U.S.
- Died: May 22, 1997 (aged 89); Chicago, Illinois, U.S.
- Education: Middlebury College (BS)
- Known for: Chemistry of uranium and rare-earth elements
- Scientific career
- Fields: Metallurgy; radiochemistry
- Workplaces: University of Chicago; Los Alamos National Laboratory

Myrtle Claire Bachelder (March 13, 1908 – May 22, 1997) was an American chemist and Women's Army Corps officer, who is noted for her secret work on the Manhattan Project atomic bomb program, and for the development of techniques in the chemistry of metals.

== Early life and career ==
Myrtle Claire Bachelder was born on March 13, 1908, in Worcester, Massachusetts. She earned a Bachelor of Science degree from Middlebury College in 1930, and became a high school science teacher and athletics coach in South Hadley Falls, Massachusetts. She received her master of education degree from Boston University.

== World War II: the atomic bomb ==
During World War II, Bachelder enlisted in the Women's Army Corps (WAC) in November 1942, at the Springfield, Massachusetts, headquarters. After spending time in training at military bases in several U.S. states, she received orders assigning her to the Company 'D' WAC Detachment of the Manhattan District, United States Army Corps of Engineers. Her secret assignment was to lead a group of 15 to 20 women from the WAC, stationed in Des Moines, Iowa, to Fort Sill, Oklahoma, and from there to Santa Fe, New Mexico. She and the women under her command arrived at Los Alamos, New Mexico, on October 21, 1943. Bachelder however reported to one more woman named Helen E. Mulvihill. Bachelder and the other women lived in a dorm.

"Manhattan" was the code name for the special military division dedicated to developing an atomic weapon. In the clandestine laboratory at the remote Los Alamos desert site, Bachelder was responsible for the analysis of the spectroscopy of uranium isotopes and discovering techniques for x-radiation. Since the uranium-235 isotope is fissile, whereas the uranium-238 isotope is not, her role in the project was a crucial task: to ensure the purity of the sub-critical material, and therefore the nuclear explosion, of the world's first atomic bombs.

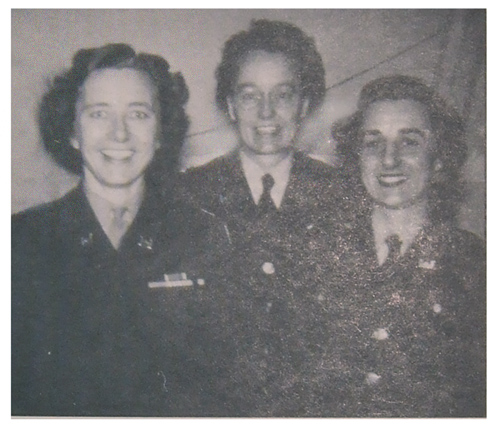
Bachelder (center) at Los Alamos in 1946, with Captain Arlene Scheidenhelm, Director of WAC, Manhattan District (left), and First Lieutenant Marguerite Carrera, Commanding Officer, WAC Los Alamos detachment (right)

These methods were used during the preparation of plutonium-239, the fissile material used in the construction of the atomic bomb for the Trinity nuclear test, on July 16, 1945. Analogous methods were used for the uranium weapon, code-named "Little Boy", which destroyed Hiroshima, Japan on August 6, 1945, and for the plutonium bomb which destroyed Nagasaki, Japan, on August 9, 1945, leading to the Japanese surrender. The secret program was under the general direction of J. Robert Oppenheimer, whom Bachelder described as:

A "pencil and paper man", immersed in physics theory, who was more than a little amazed by the Los Alamos lab machinery. Bachelder recalled Oppenheimer standing in front of her lab's most important and expensive instrument punching buttons at random ... He asked "What does this do?" Then he'd punch another button ... He might have wrecked the machine if he hadn't finally been persuaded to leave it alone.

== Contribution to post-war developments in nuclear energy ==
The conclusion of the Second World War was also the dawning of a new "Atomic Age", in which the peacetime potential of nuclear energy began to be explored. Bachelder was among the scientists who opposed the May-Johnson Bill of October 1945, a Congressional bill proposed by the Interim Committee, which would have maintained military control over nuclear research. The bill was defeated in Congress and superseded by the McMahon Atomic Energy Act. In January 1947, the newly formed Atomic Energy Commission approved the declassification of 270 previously secret documents. These included discoveries related to X-radiation and purification of uranium ores, which had been made by Bachelder during the course of the war effort. At this time, the rarity and importance of Bachelder's achievements as a woman in science were also acknowledged.

== Scientific research and later career ==
After leaving the Army, Bachelder became a research chemist at the University of Chicago, where the first self-sustaining nuclear reaction had been achieved in 1942. Nobel Laureate James Franck had been director of the Chemistry Division of the Metallurgical Laboratory during the earlier phases of the Manhattan Project. Bachelder joined the University's Institute for the Study of Metals (renamed as the James Franck Institute in 1967), and she conducted further research in metallochemistry.

Among other achievements, Bachelder developed methods for the purification of the rare elements tellurium and indium. Other aspects of her broad scientific expertise found application in the field of marine archaeology, when she determined the chemical composition of brass cannons found in the Aegean Sea on sunken ships. She also made contributions to astrochemistry, when NASA asked her to analyze the chemistry of Moon rocks which had been collected from the Moon's surface during the Apollo missions from 1969 to 1972.

Bachelder retired from the Franck Institute in 1973, and was subsequently active as an official of the American Association of Retired Persons (AARP). She died in Chicago on May 22, 1997.

== Reflections ==
Bachelder believed that her role in the development of the atomic bomb, and the subsequent use of atomic weapons against Japan, had been justified in order to end the Second World War and to avoid greater loss of life that would have been entailed in a U.S. land invasion and extended conflict with Japan. Later, during the period of the Strategic Arms Limitation Talks, Bachelder stated that, although she supported nuclear arms control:

Opponents of nuclear weapons should resist the urge to take the 1940s bomb-building effort out of its proper historical context — "One cannot pull that activity out of that time, set it down in the 1980s, and pass judgement."

Bachelder's always made time for her voracious reading habits. "She made the most of each day. She, too, knew the importance of working hard, ignoring the clock, and always challenging herself."
