= Paul Galvin (businessman) =

Co-founder of Motorola (1895–1959)

- Born: Paul Vincent Galvin; June 29, 1895; Harvard, Illinois, U.S.
- Died: November 5, 1959 (aged 64); Evanston, Illinois, U.S.
- Education: Illinois Institute of Technology
- Known for: Car radio
- Title: CEO of Motorola
- Term: 1928–1959
- Successor: Bob Galvin (son)

Paul Vincent Galvin (June 29, 1895 – November 5, 1959) was an American chief executive, who was one of the two founders of telecommunications company Motorola. Founded as Galvin Manufacturing Corporation on September 25, 1928, Motorola worked in communications equipment. Galvin created the mass production car radio, which provided the cornerstone of Motorola's early business. The company name "Motorola" was introduced in 1930.

== Personal life ==
Galvin was born in Harvard, Illinois, to John and Alice Galvin. He studied at the University of Illinois, joining the school's debate society. In 1916, he entered the Army's training program, and was assigned as a radio officer during World War I. Later, Galvin attended Illinois Institute of Technology. During college, Galvin was an active member of the Phi Kappa Theta fraternity. He lived briefly in Marshfield, Wisconsin. In 1942, his wife Lillian was murdered in their home in Evanston, Illinois, a murder which was never solved.

== Founding of Motorola ==
Galvin founded Motorola as the Galvin Manufacturing Corporation, in September 1928. In its initial years, his company relied on repairing defective components from Sears to supplant their meager sales proceeds. When the radio market dipped in the 1929 stock market crash, Galvin's engineers began to work on a radio that could be fitted into a car. Several problems persisted with the design, such as tuning shaft vibration modulating the sound. In 1930, the final product was released under the Motorola brand, a portmanteau of "Motor" and "Victrola". As the United States entered the Second World War, Galvin's company designed the "Handie-Talkie", a portable two-way radio intended for Army use. The radio was widely used by both ground and air forces, and over 40, 000 units were manufactured before 1945. After the war, his team designed the first affordable television set, the VT-71, which sold for under $200. Several university buildings are named after Galvin, including Galvin Library on the Illinois Institute of Technology's main campus, Galvin Hall at the University of Notre Dame, and the Paul V. Galvin Playhouse at Arizona State University.

== Later life and death ==
In 1956, Galvin's son Robert took over leadership of Motorola. Two years later, Paul Galvin developed a respiratory infection which left him bedridden, and he died on November 5, 1959.

== See also ==
- Battery eliminator

CEO of Motorola; 1928 - 1959	Succeeded by Bob Galvin
